= Churches of Kraków =

Churches of Kraków, Poland

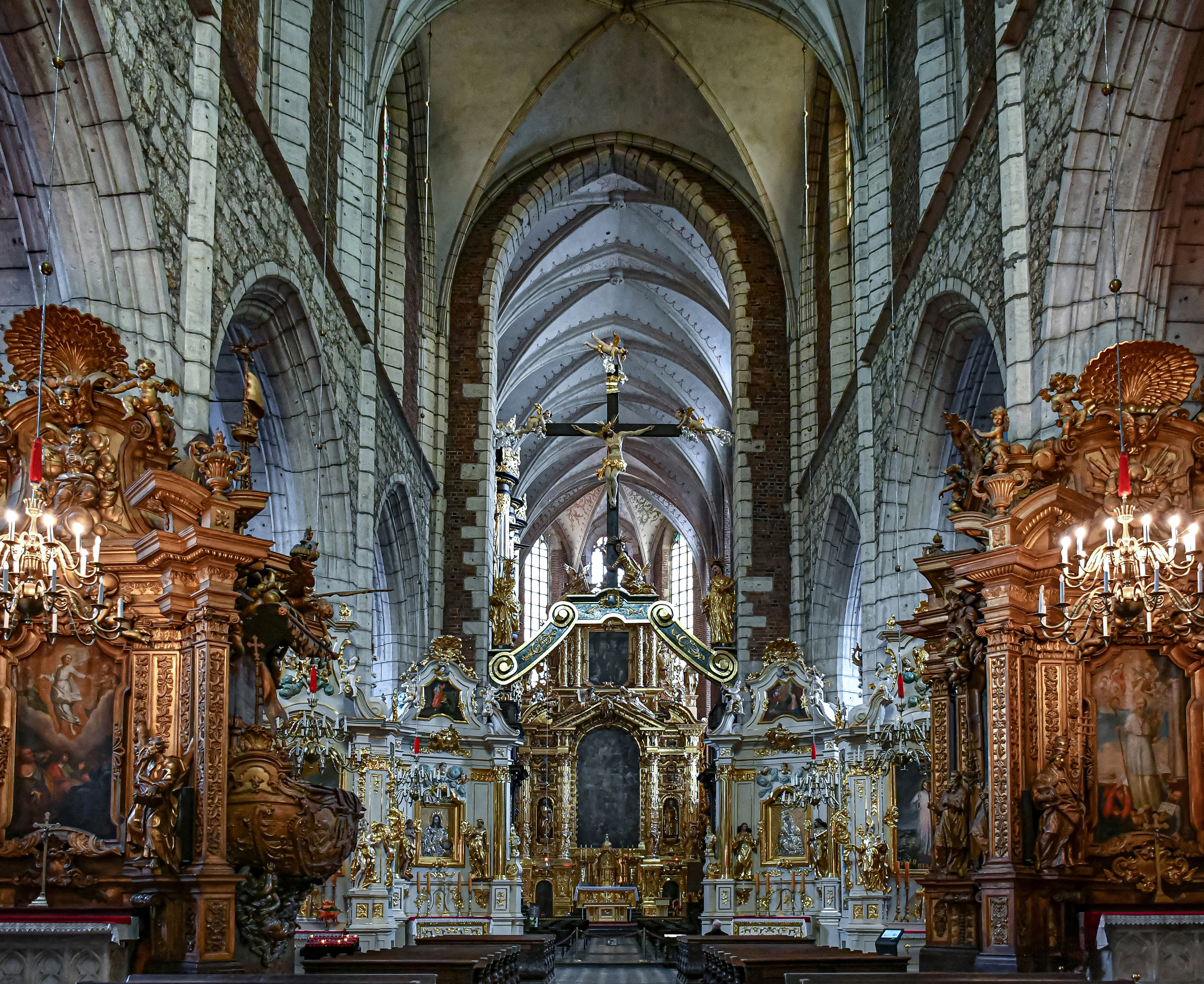
The main nave of Corpus Christi Basilica in Kraków district of Kazimierz

The metropolitan city of Kraków, former capital of Poland, is known as the "city of churches". The abundance of landmark, historic Roman Catholic churches along with the plenitude of monasteries and convents earned the city a countrywide reputation as the "Northern Rome" in the past of the churches of krakow The churches of Kraków comprise over 120 Roman Catholic places of worship, of which over 60 were built in the 20th century. They remain the centers of religious life for the local population and are attended regularly, while some are often crowded on Sundays.

The number of churches in Kraków still increases. Many of the oldest churches are architectural monuments of Poland's history and culture. They often house religious icons and artifacts revered for their artistic and spiritual value.

== Prominent examples ==
Among the many historic churches in Kraków, the most famous include the Saints Peter and Paul Church (Kościół św. Piotra i Pawła) on Grodzka Street, the neighbouring St. Andrew's Church (Kościół św. Andrzeja), Saint Michael the Archangel and Saint Stanislaus the Bishop and Martyr Basilica at Skałka (Kościół Paulinow na Skałce), St. Catherine's Church (Kościół św. Katarzyny), the Dominican Church and Monastery (Zespoły klasztorne Dominikanów) and the nearby Basilica of St. Francis of Assisi of the Order of Friars Minor.

Most Roman Catholic church buildings of special significance for the Poles are located in the Kraków Old Town (Stare Miasto) especially along the Royal coronation route traversed by early Polish monarchs. The Wawel Cathedral on the Wawel Hill dating back to the 14th century includes a Sigismund Chapel – a masterpiece of Polish Renaissance architecture – as well as the Zygmunt bell of 1520, one of the most magnificent bells ever made. St. Mary's Basilica built in the 14th century at the Main Square is famous for its largest Gothic altarpiece in the world. The Basilica of St. Francis of Assisi built in 1237–69 is located on Franciszkanska 2 street opposite the Archbishop Palace. It features stained glass windows by the Young Poland's nominal artist Stanisław Wyspiański. The Church of St. Wojciech at the main square (Old Town), with a Baroque dome, is one of the oldest stone churches in Poland, with an almost one-thousand-year-old history. Along the Royal Road, there's also the Romanesque St. Andrew's Church at Grodzka street, built in the 11th century, featuring the 17th-century Baroque interior. Right next to it, there's the striking Baroque Saints Peter and Paul Church with oversized stone statues of the twelve Apostles in the front – the most revered Baroque church of the 17th century behind Church of the Gesù. St. Florian's Church on Warszawska street is where the Royal Road begins. It is a Collegiate church and a mausoleum for the relics of St. Florian, the patron saint of Poland.

Other notable churches are the Baroque Church of St. Anne, a collegiate church built 1689–1705 by Tylman van Gameren; the Church of St. Barbara with Baroque interior, at pl. Mariacki square, next to Saint Mary's Basilica; and, the Baroque Church of St. Bernard next to Wawel, with many paintings. The notable old churches outside of the Old Town include the 13th-century Gothic Basilica of the Holy Trinity at the Dominikanski square; and, the Corpus Christi Basilica in Kazimierz district, which dates back to mid-14th century and features an impressive high altar built in 1634.

The Church of St. Casimir the Prince located at ul. Reformacka 4 street in the Old Town district (Stare Miasto), (adjacent to Baroque Basilica of St. Francis of Assisi with its catacombs in the crypt, contains some of the most secret places in the city. The crypt holds almost 1,000 bodies put on public display but once a year on All Souls' Day. The unique climatic conditions found in the basement caused the bodies of the dead to undergo the process of natural mummification and are in excellent state still today (see: picture gallery). The High Gothic Church of St. Catherine in Kazimierz – next to Skałka – features a three-story high Baroque altarpiece; the Romanesque Church of the Holiest Savior at Bronisławy street was rebuilt 1670–1673. The Gothic Church of the Holy Cross at pl. Sw. Ducha square has Baroque altarpieces; the Church of the Transfiguration, built 1714–1727, is also found in the Old Town; the Gothic Church of St. Mark at the corner of Sławkowska and Marka streets has a Renaissance interior. The Church of the Mother of God, the Queen of Poland, in Bienczyce district of Nowa Huta, an ultra-modern church built in the shape of Noah's Ark, with a lunar stone in its tabernacle brought back from the moon by American astronauts. Other notable churches include the Church of St. Nicholas with a 15th-century altarpiece; the Church of St. Norbert with a Rococo altarpiece from mid-18th century; the Church of St. Theresa with its 14th-century statue of the Madonna; the Church of the Annunciation with an Italian-Baroque interior circa 1675 and the adjacent Carmelite monastery.

Beside the predominantly Roman Catholic churches active in the city, there is a small, but visible representation of a number of other religious denominations, among them: the Lutheran Congregation at the Church of St. Martin built in the years 1637-1640, located at 58 Grodzka street; the Evangelical Church "Mission of Grace" at Lubomirskiego 7a, and the Methodist Church at Długa 3; Christ the Saviour Presbyterian Church at Smolki 8, the Orthodox Church at Szpitalna 24; Baptist Church "Bethel" (PL: 'Betel') at 12/3 Zacisze; Greek Catholic Church at Wiślna 11, Pentecostal Church "Bethlehem" at Lubomirskiego 7a; and Seventh-day Adventists at Lubelska 25 street.

== Roman Catholic Churches ==
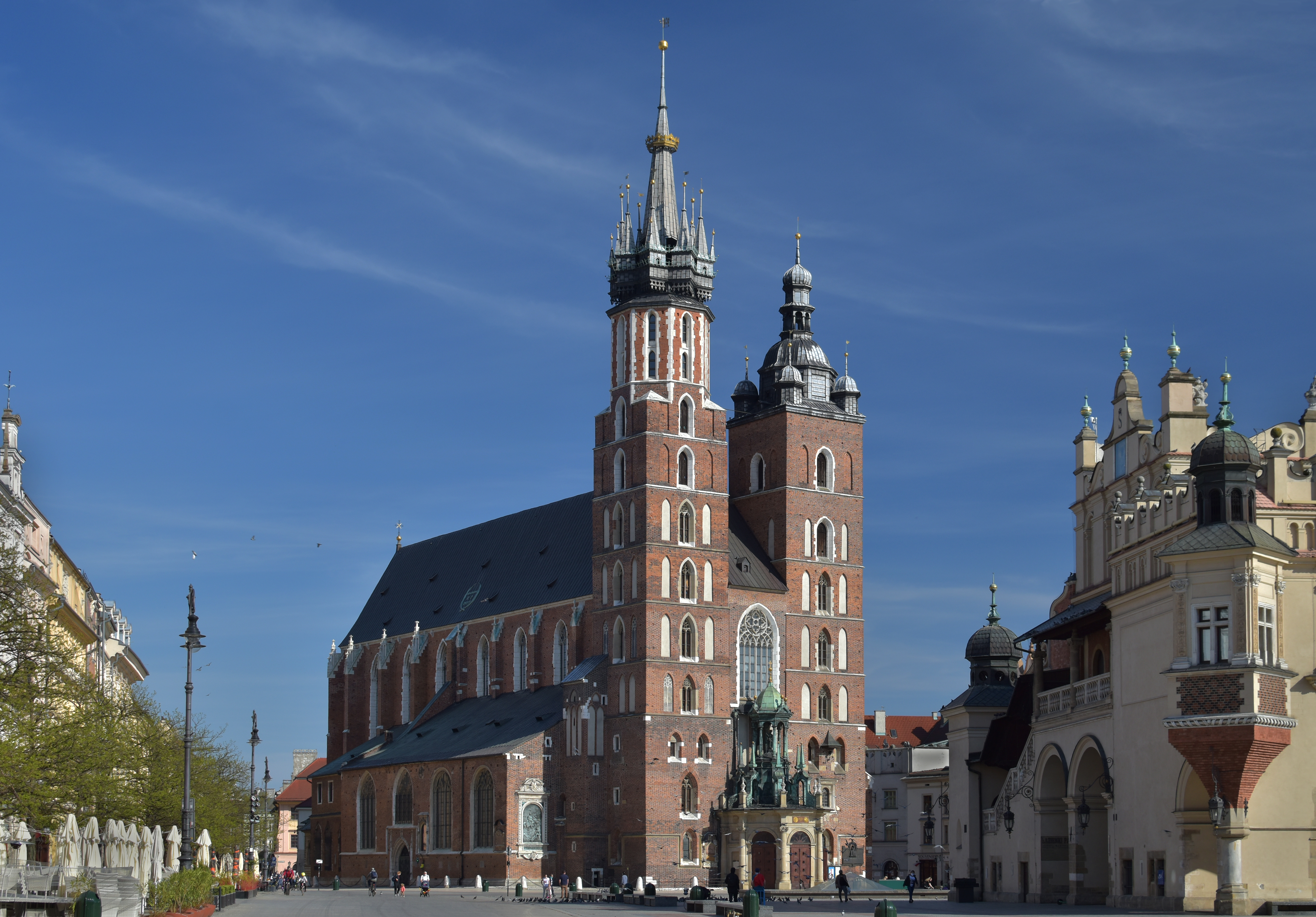
St. Mary's Church
Mariacki Square

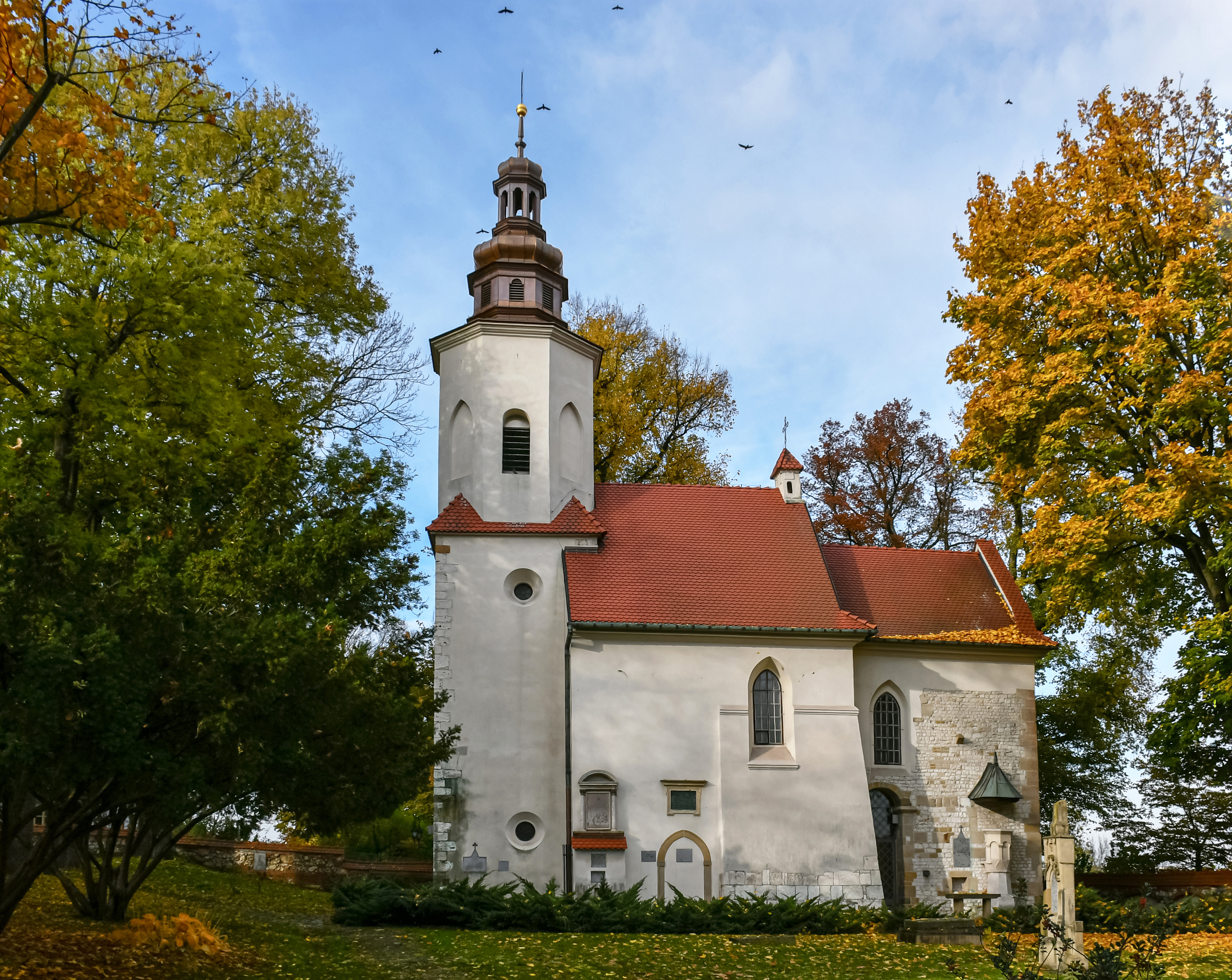
Church of the Holy Saviour
5 bł. Bronisławy Street

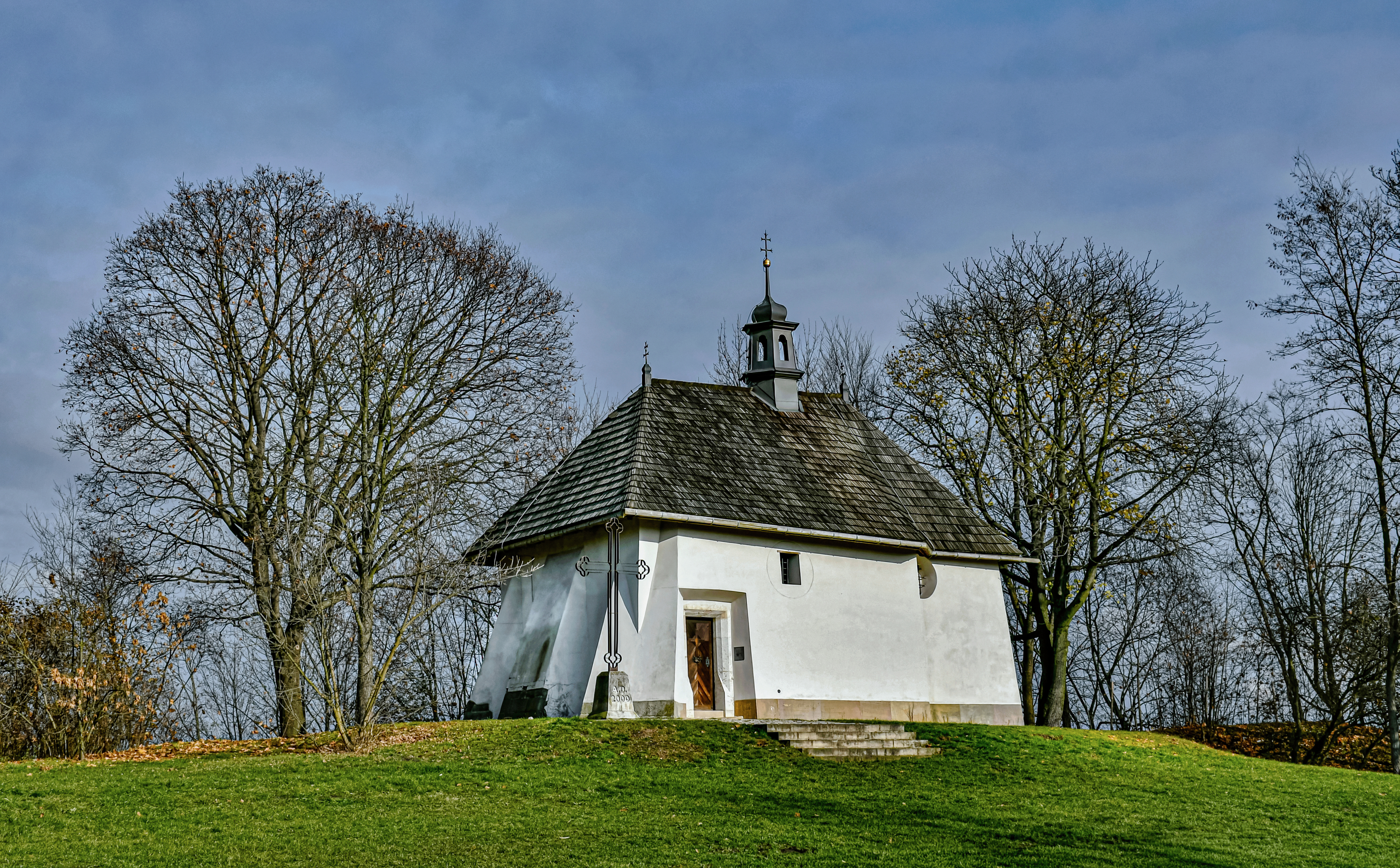
St. Benedict of Nursia Church
Stawarza Street

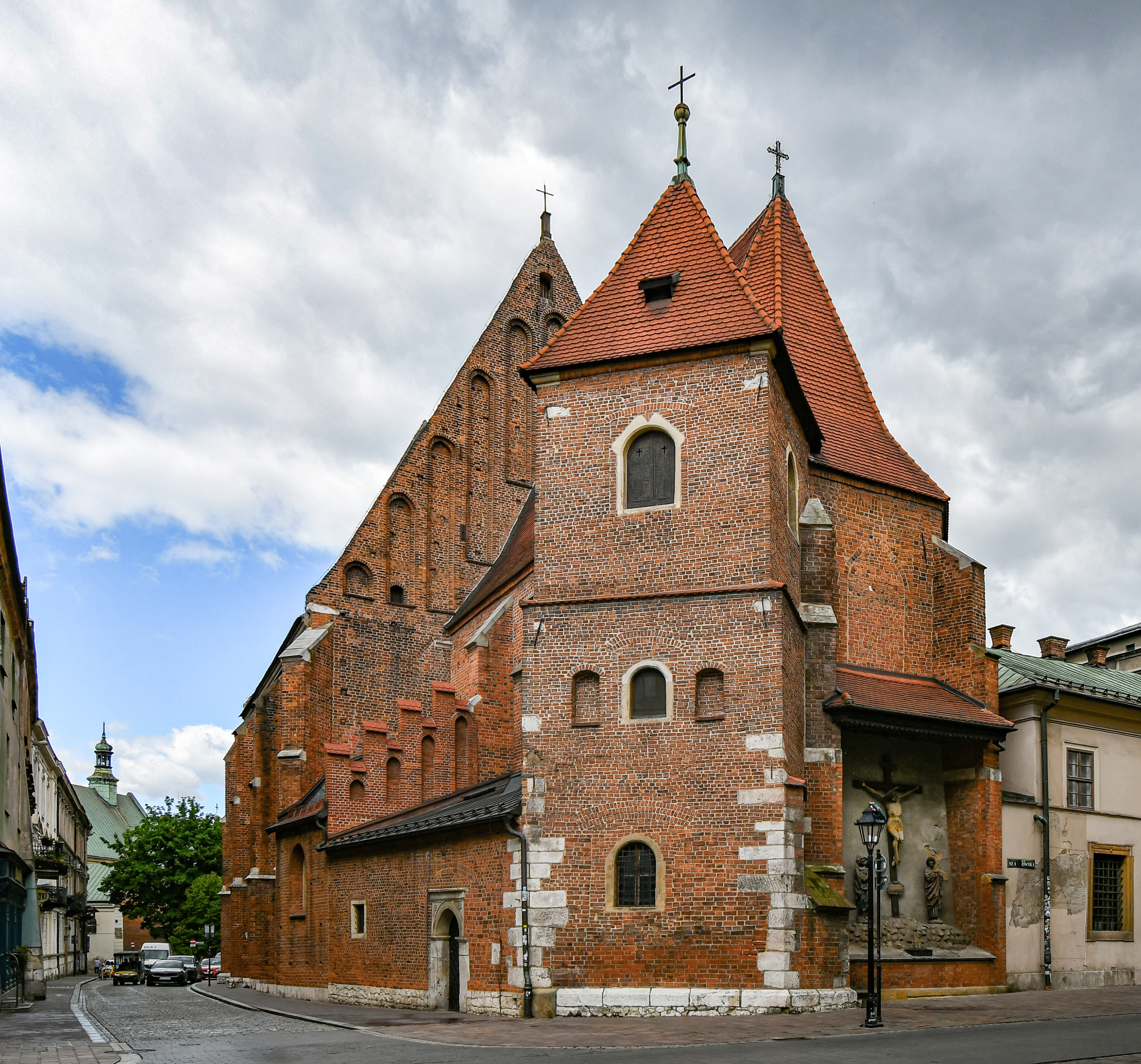
Church of St. Mark
10 św. Marka Street

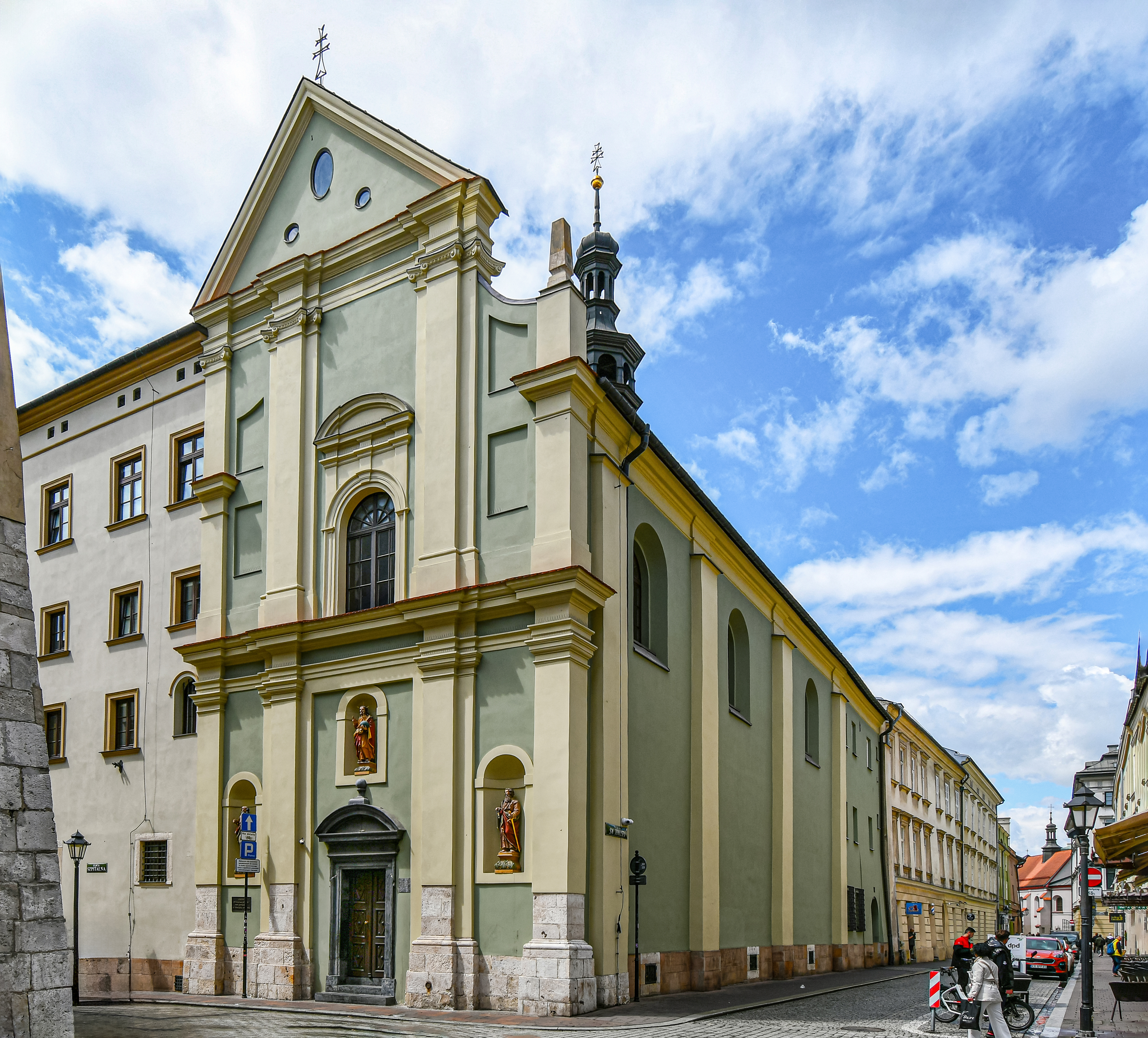
Church of St. Thomas
12 Szpitalna Street

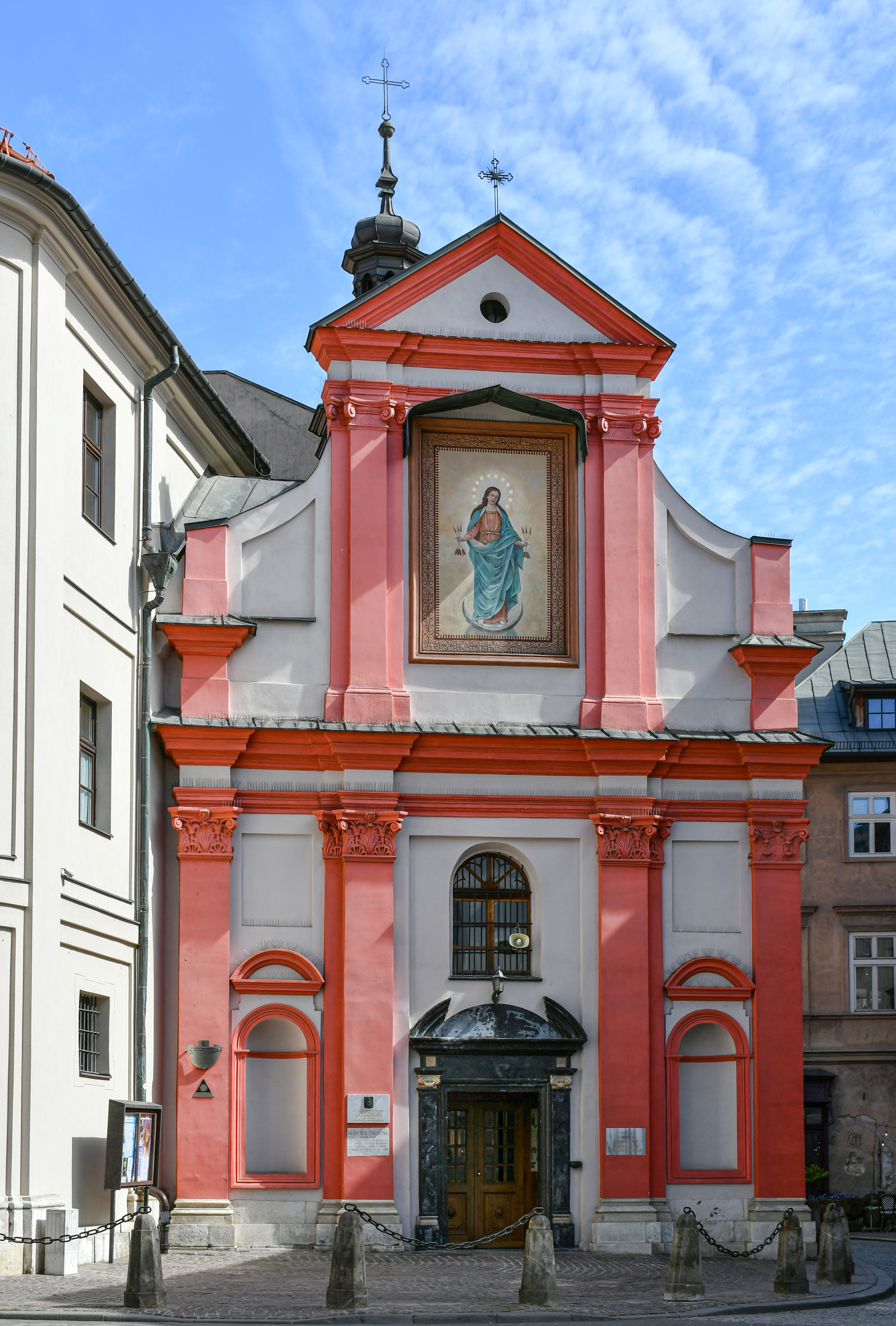
Church of St. John the Baptist and St. John the Evangelist
7 św. Jana Street

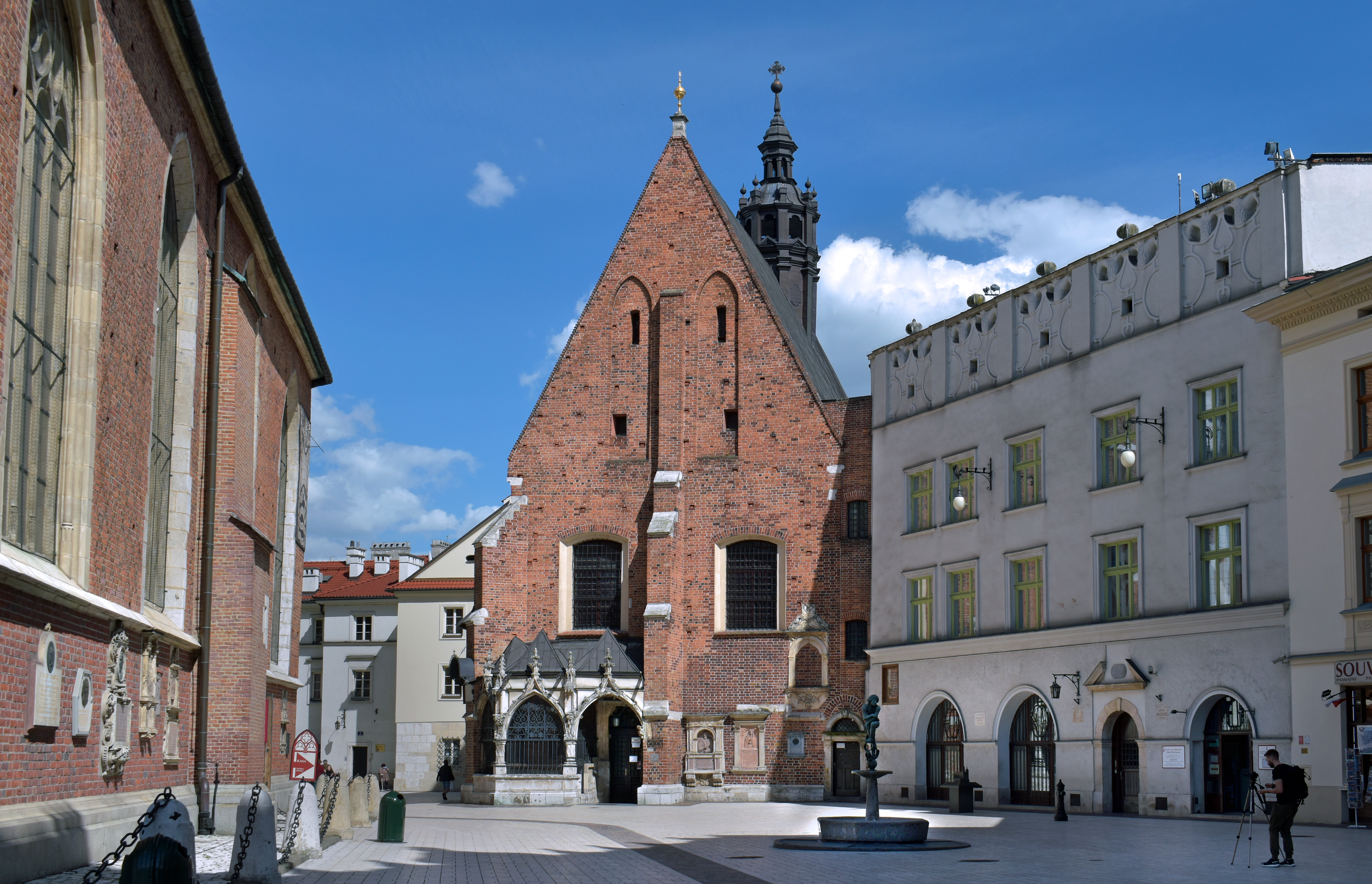
Church of St. Barbara
9 Little Market Square

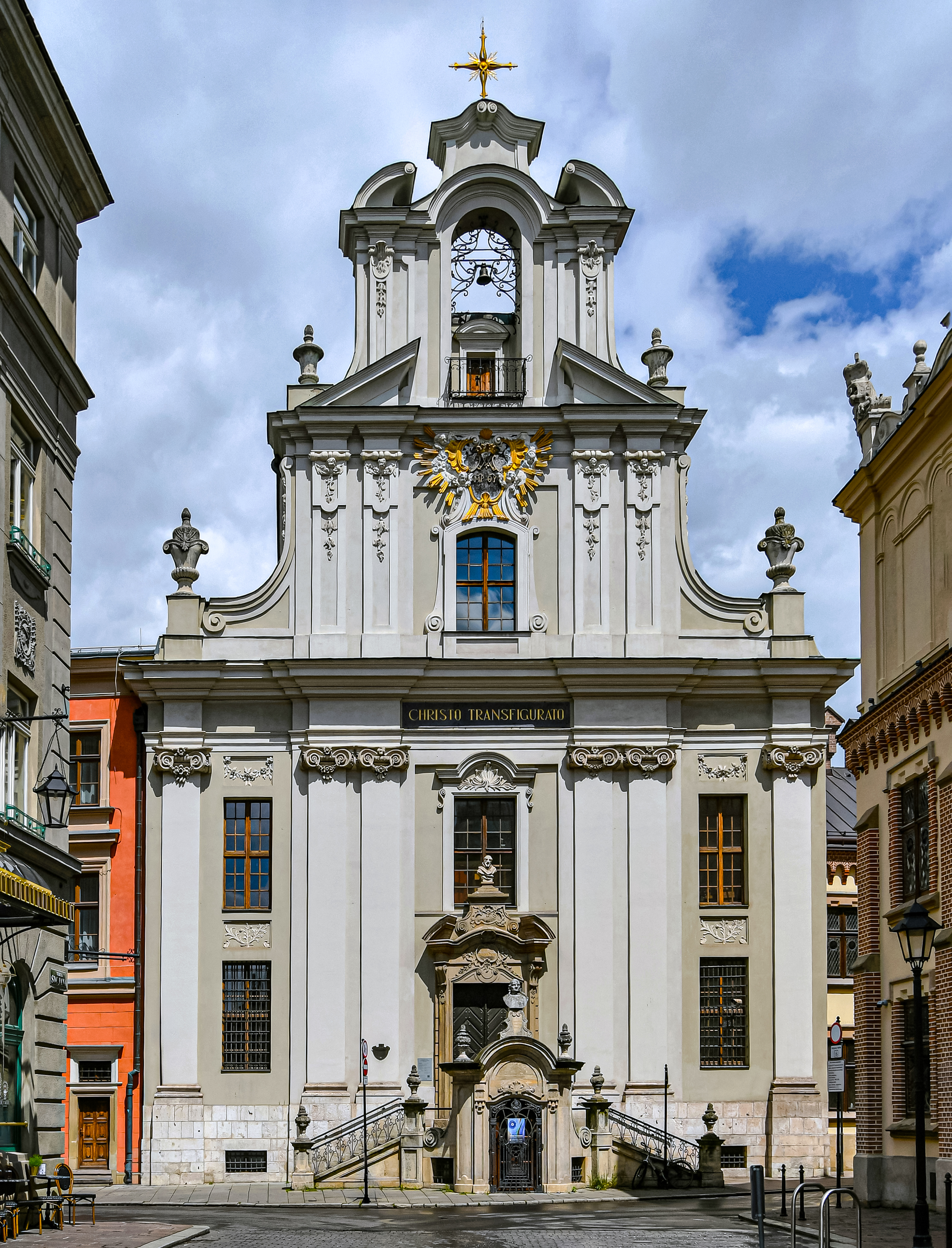
Church of the Transfiguration, Kraków
4 Pijarska Street

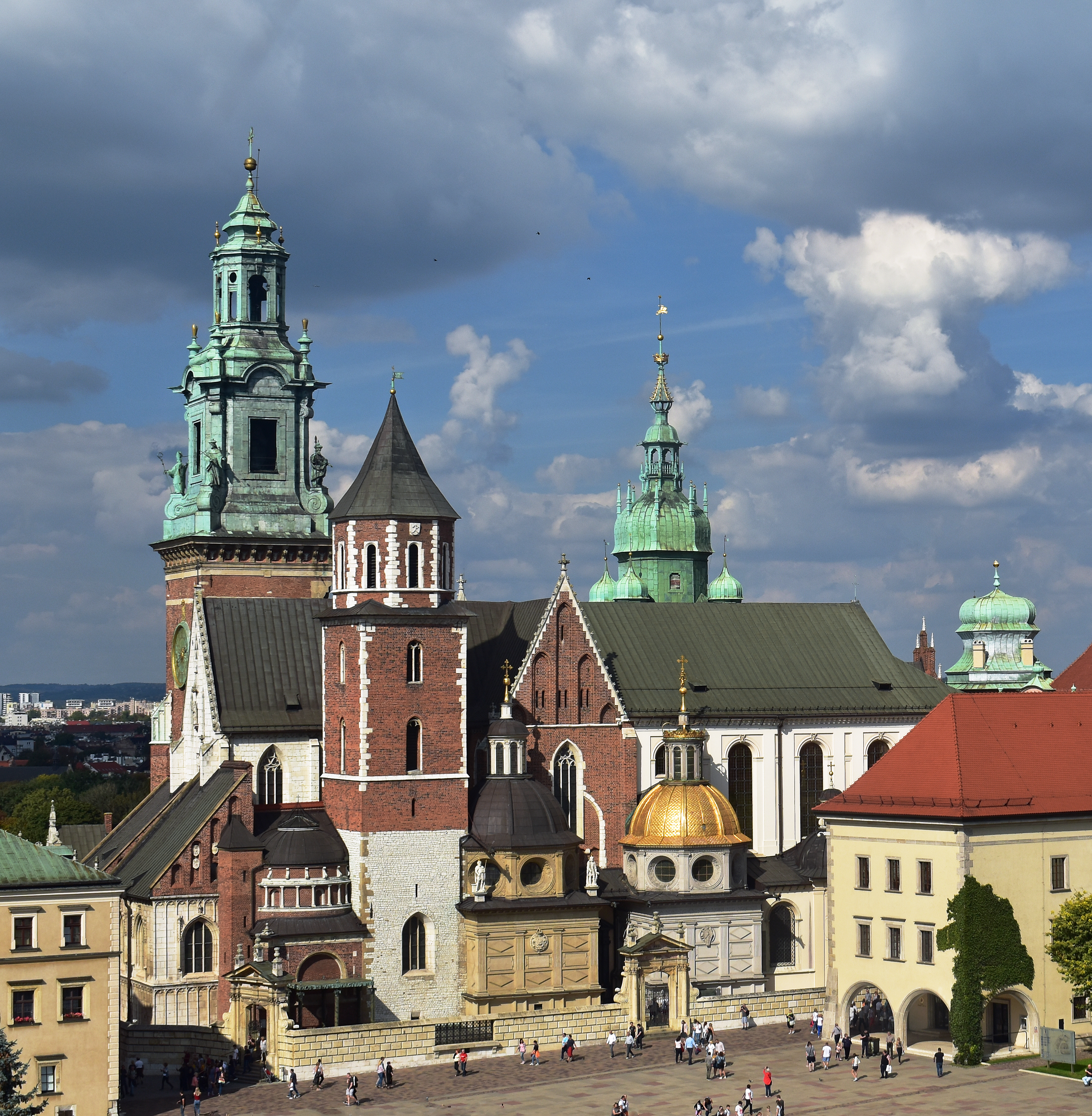
Archcathedral Church of St. Stanislaus and St. Wenceslaus, Wawel

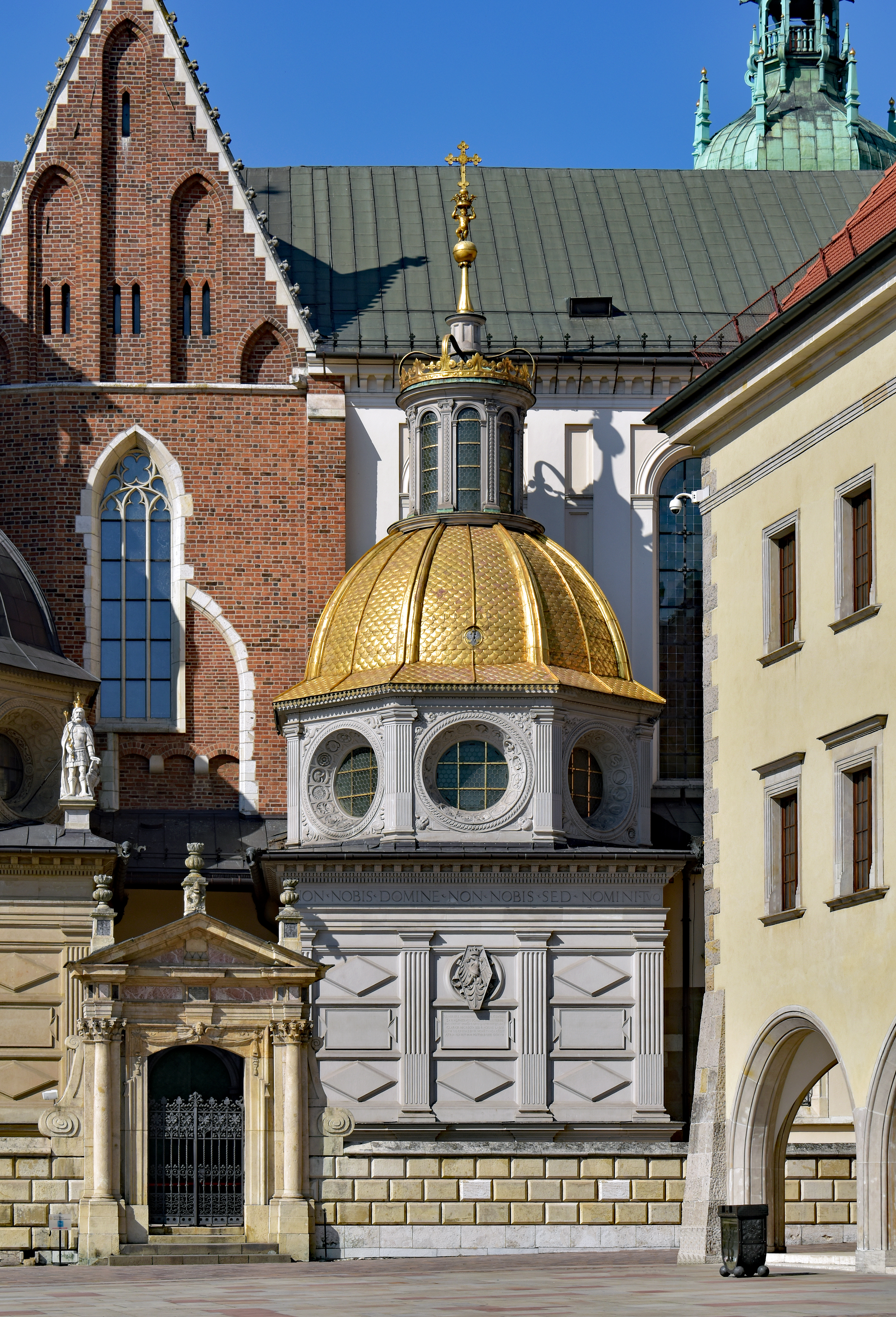
Sigismund Chapel at the Cathedral

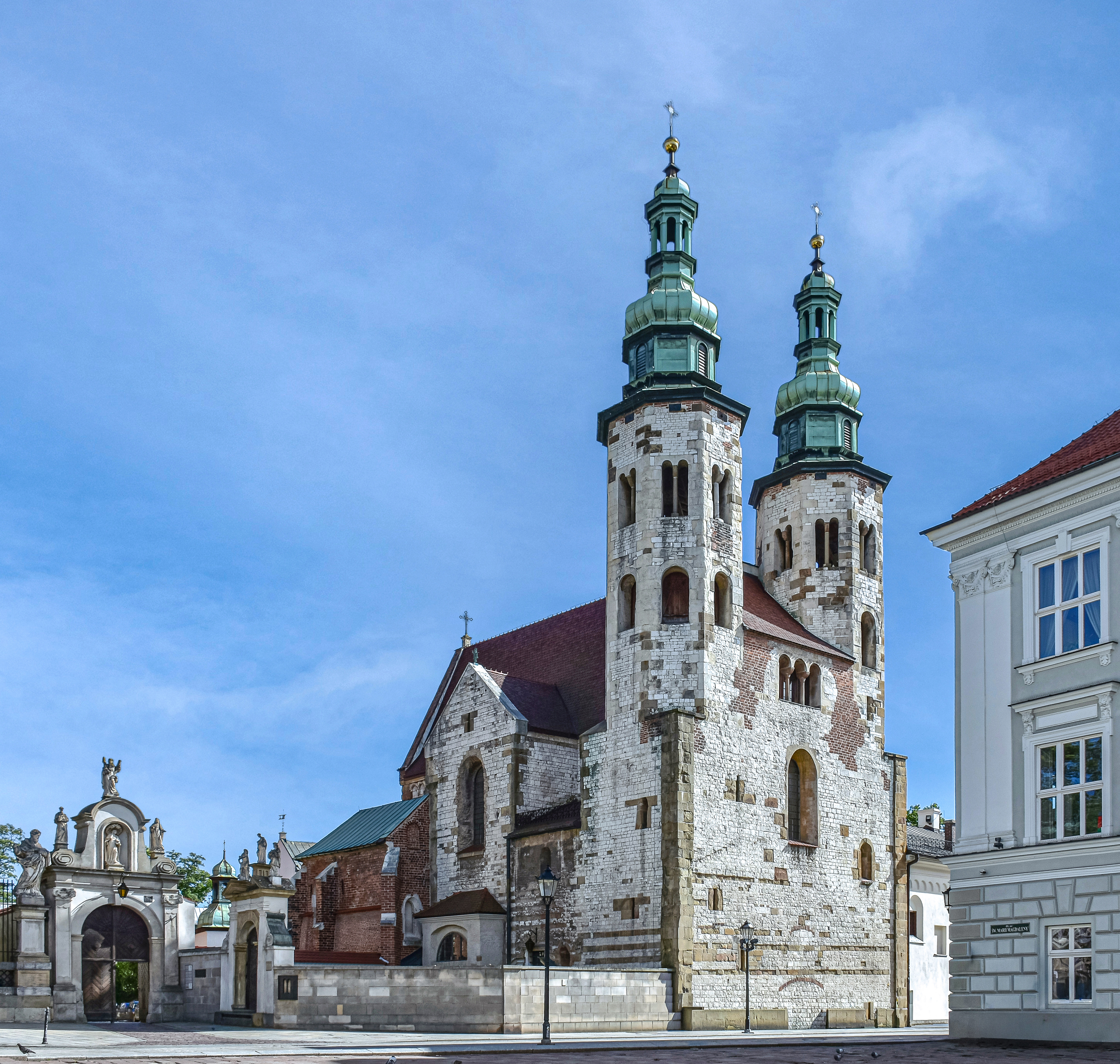
St. Andrew's Church

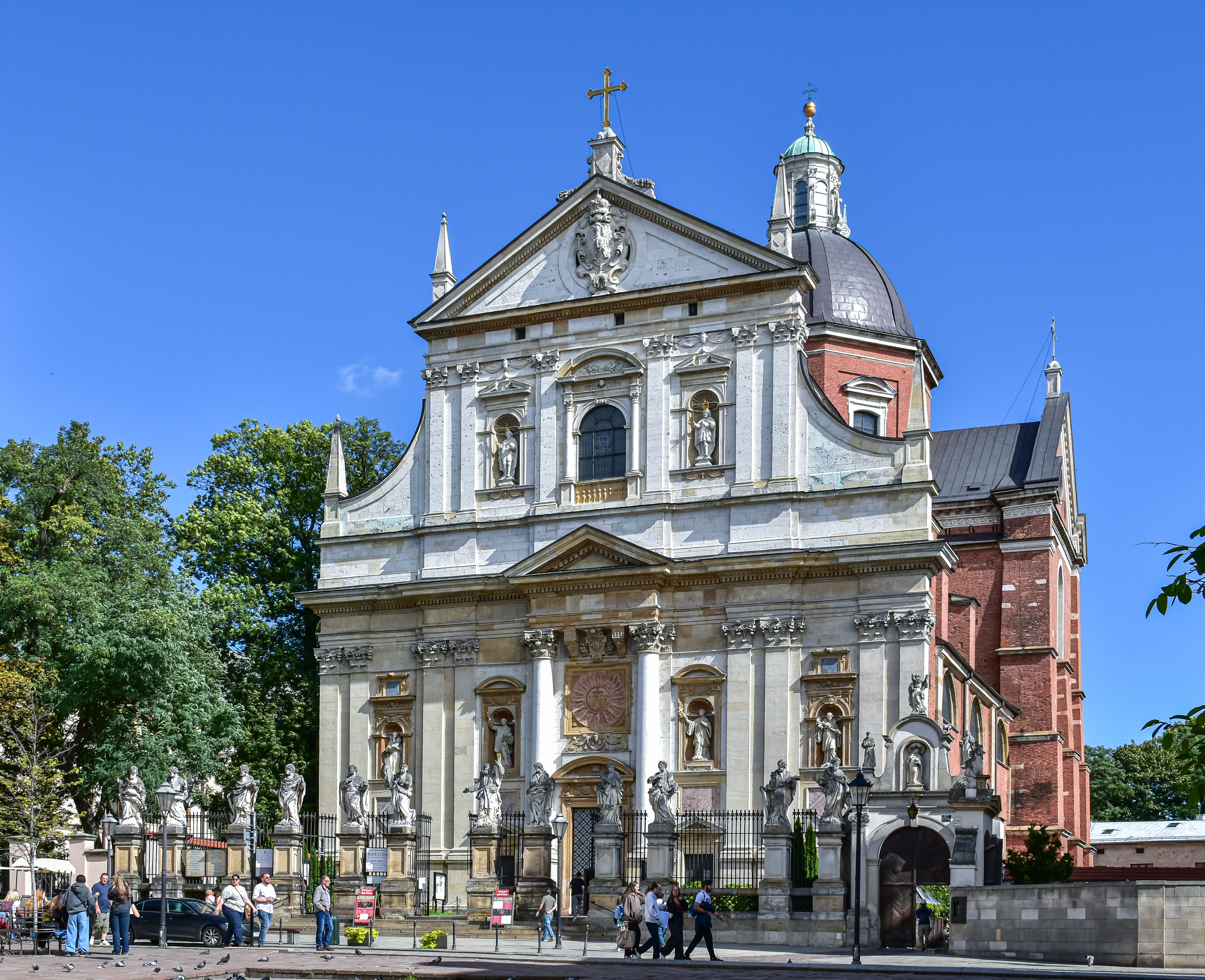
Saints Peter and Paul Church

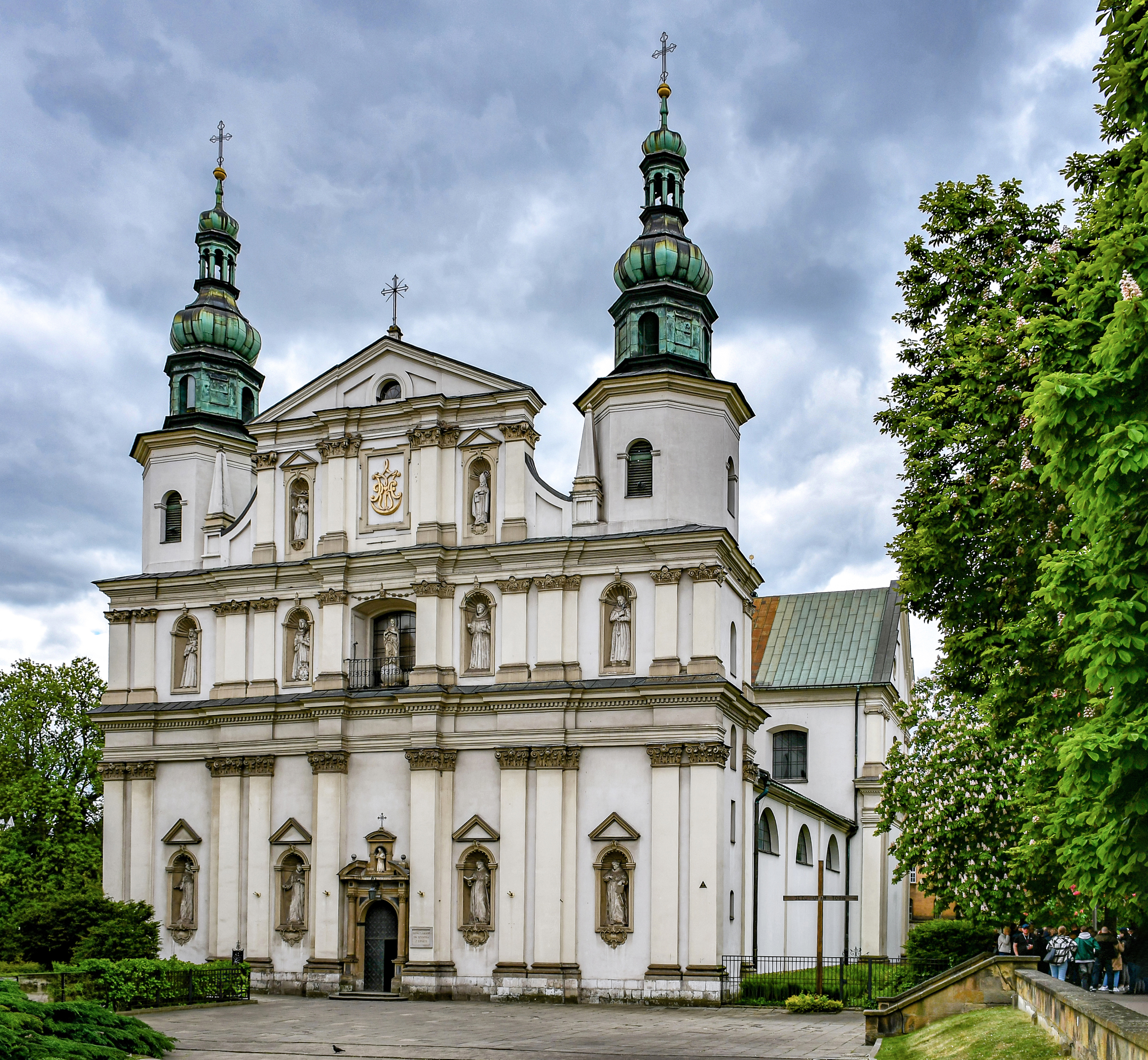
Church of St. Bernardino of Siena
2 Bernardyńska Street

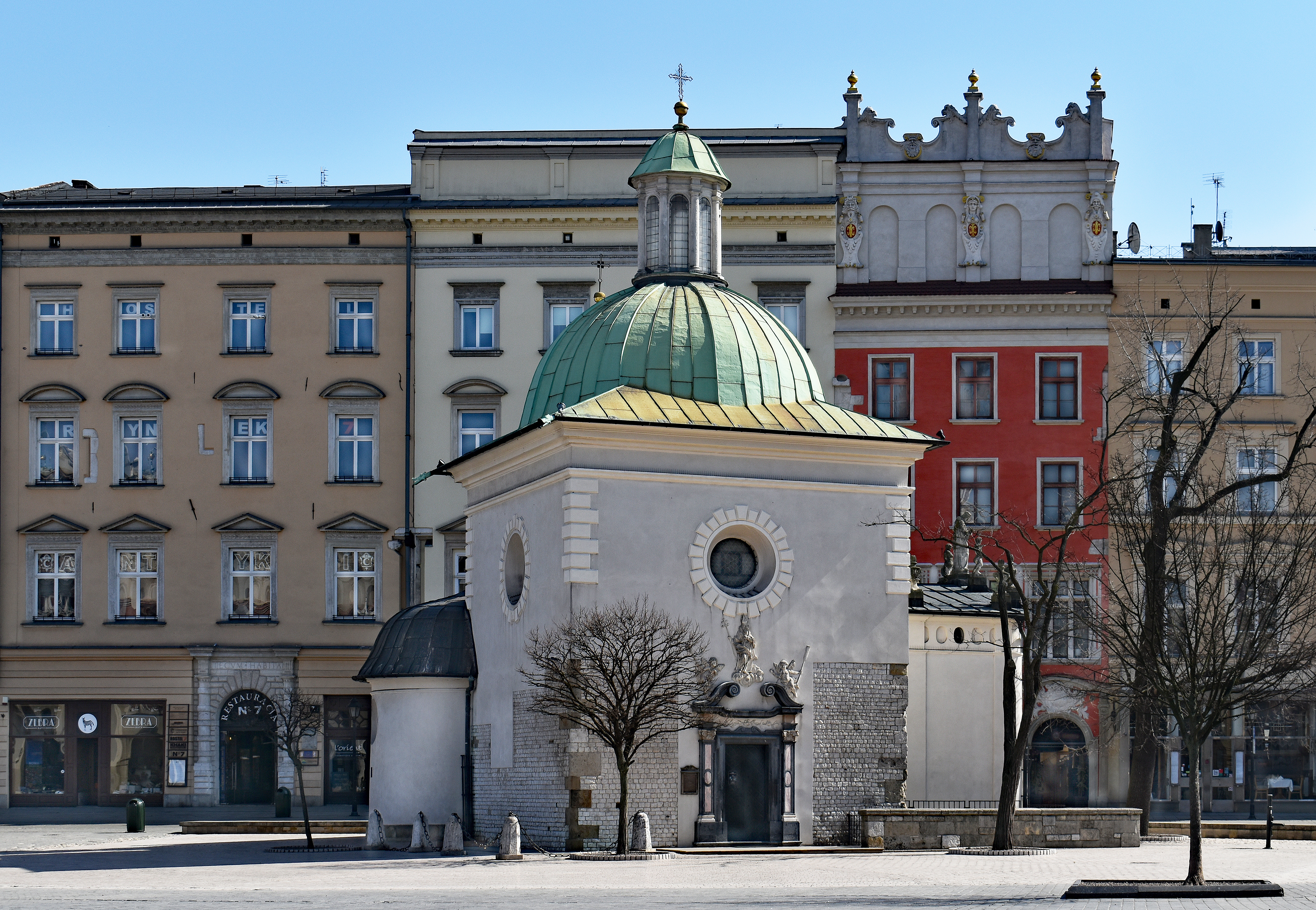
Church of St. Wojciech
2 Main Market Square

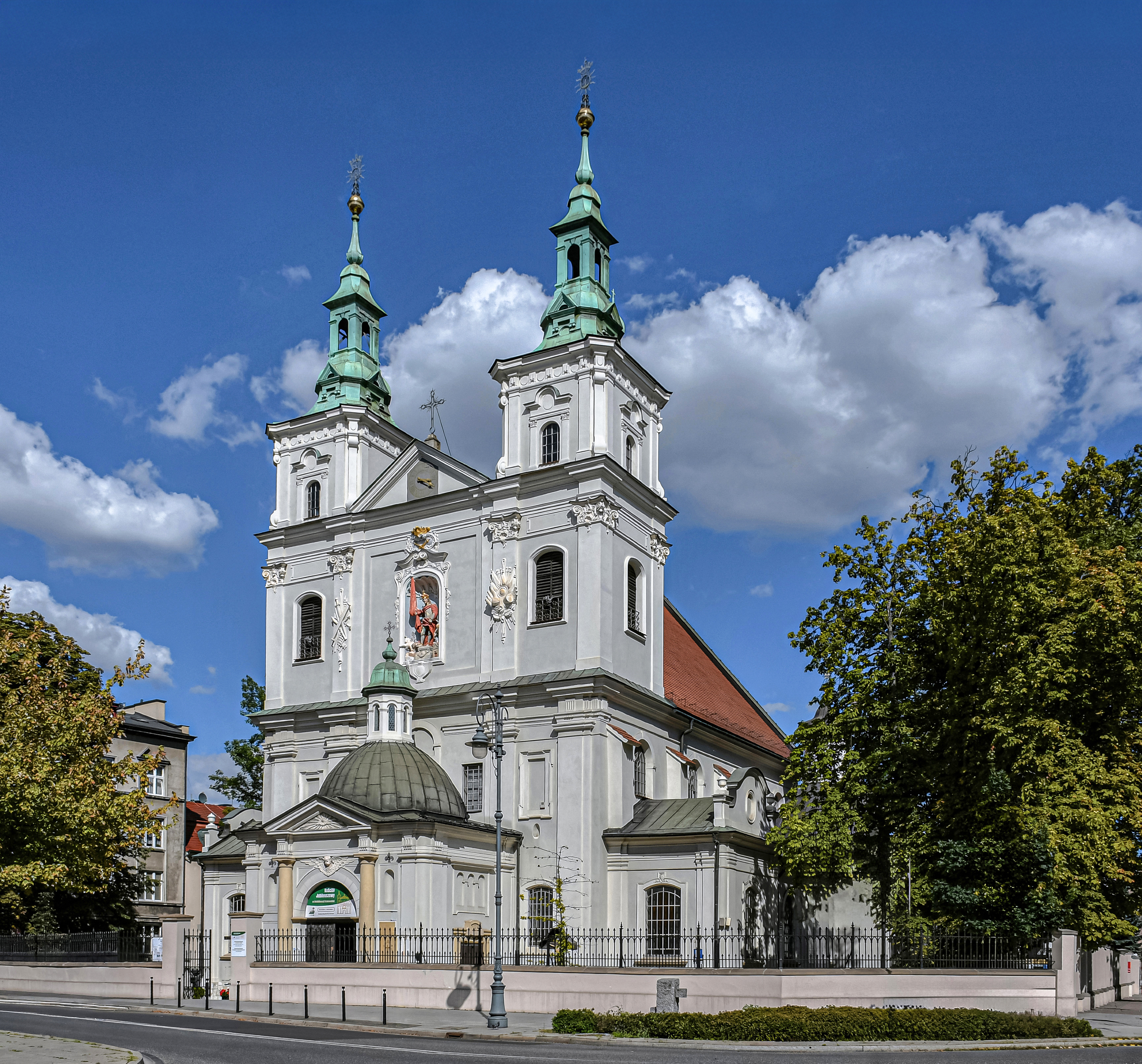
Church of St. Florian

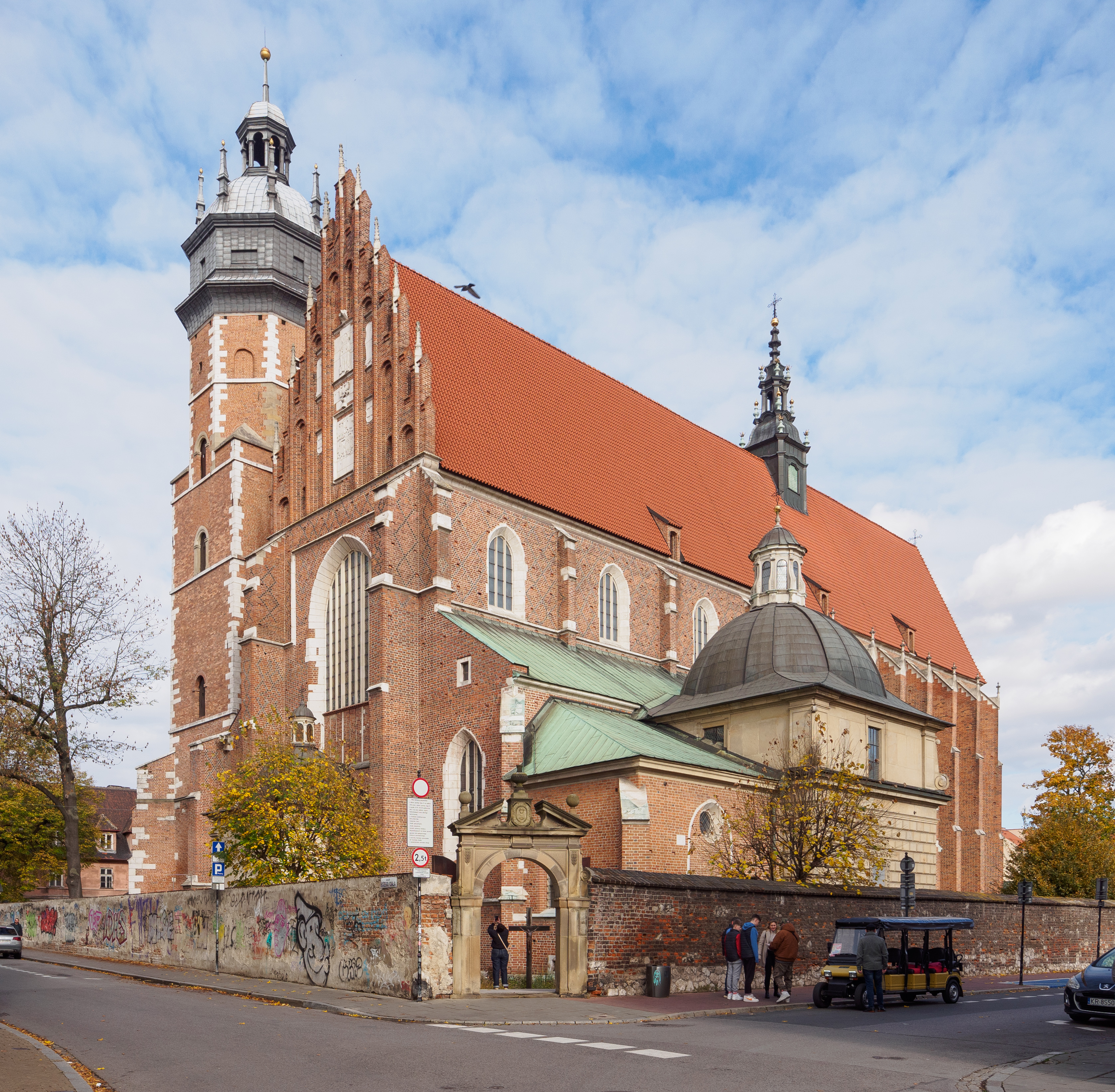
Corpus Christi Church

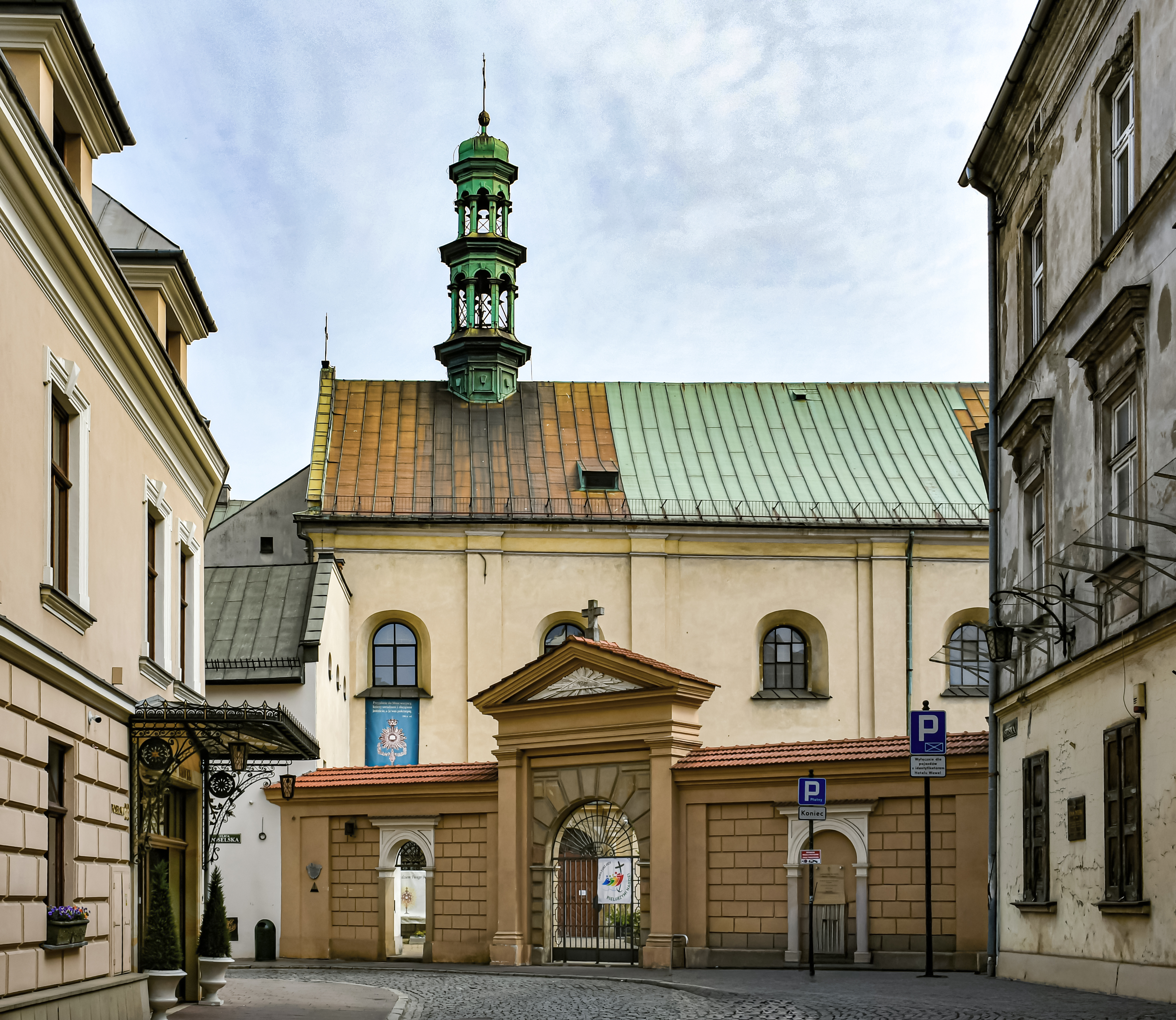
Church of St. Joseph
Old Town

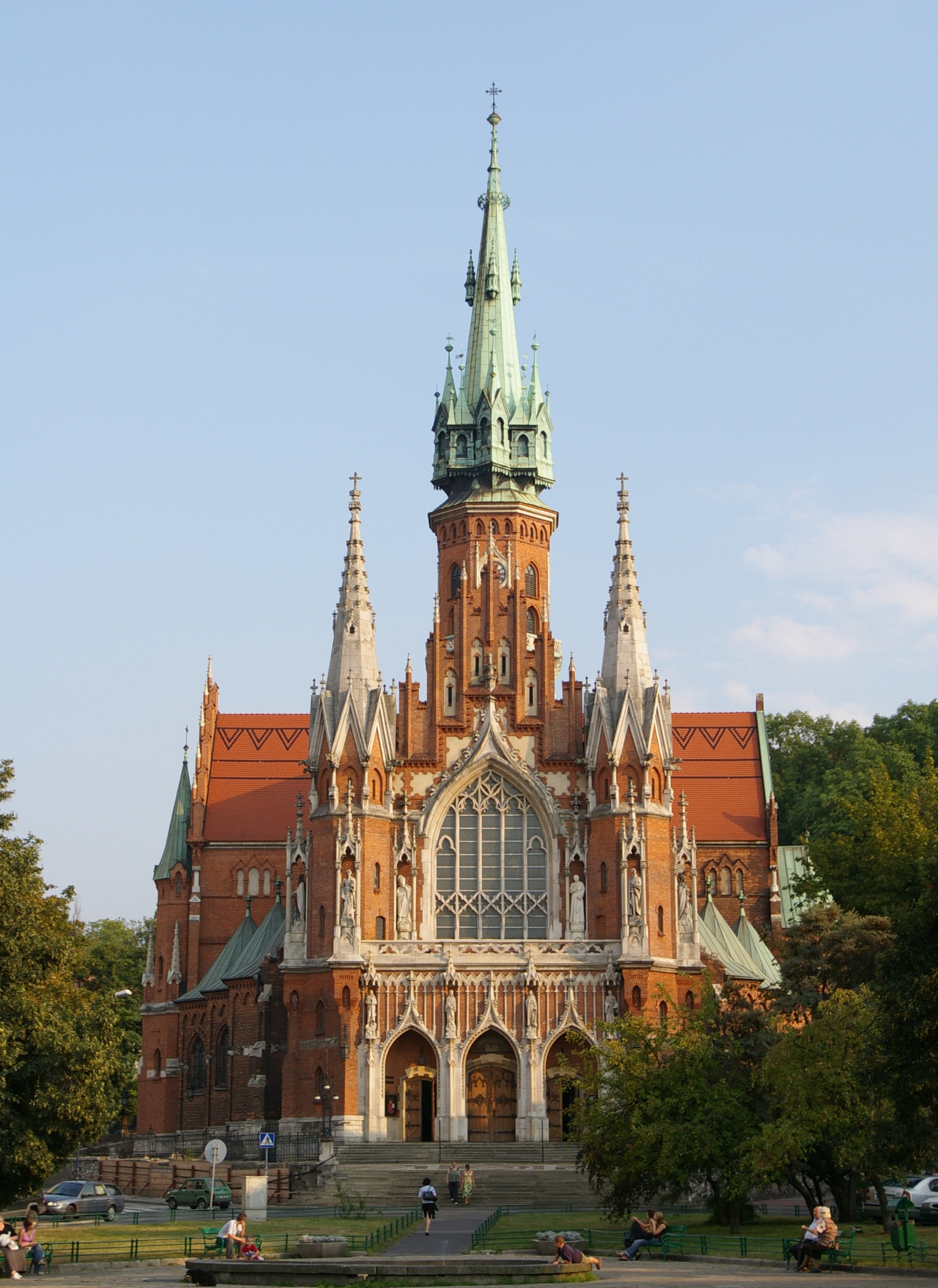
Church of St. Joseph
Podgórze

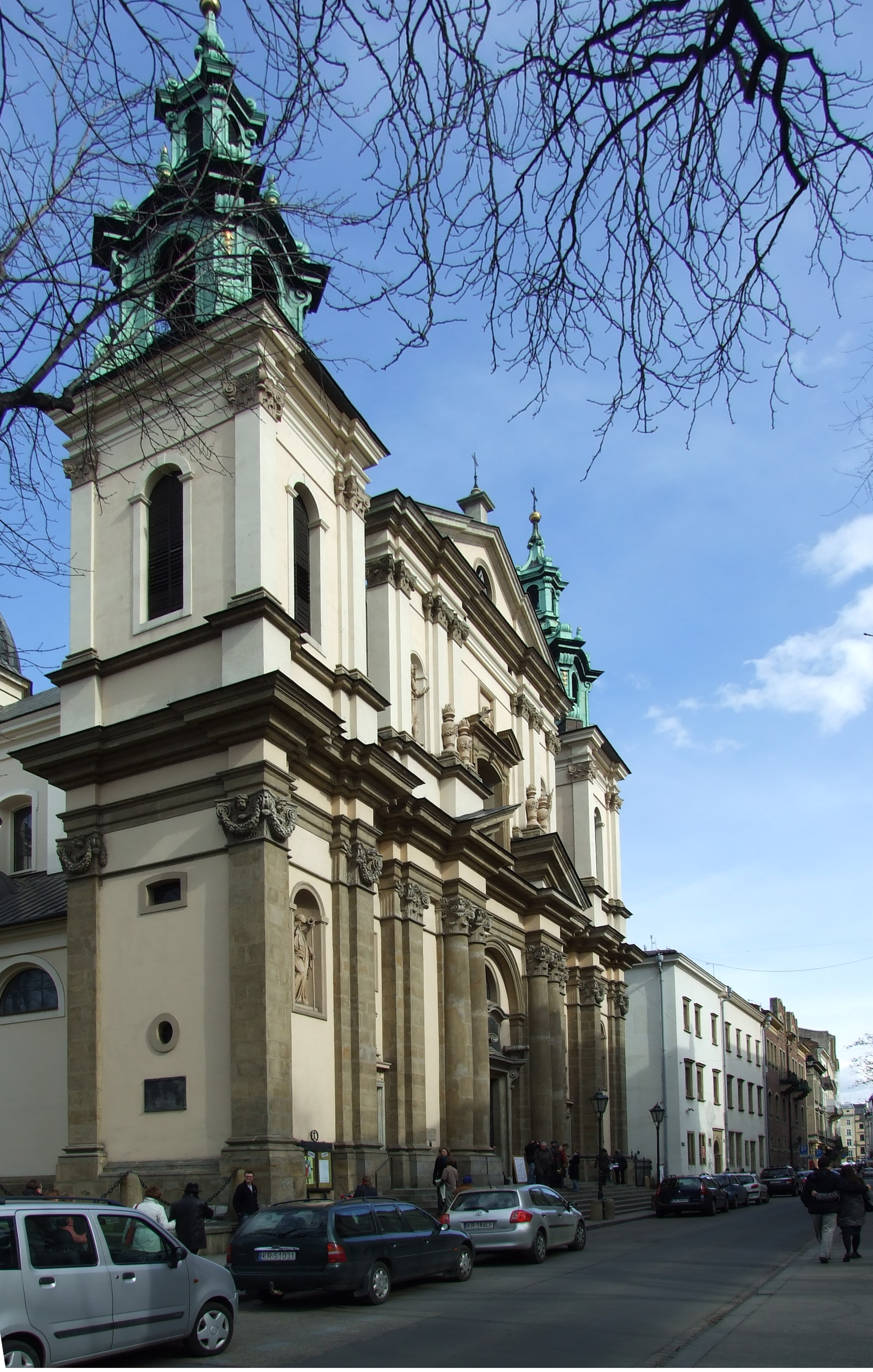
Church of St. Anne

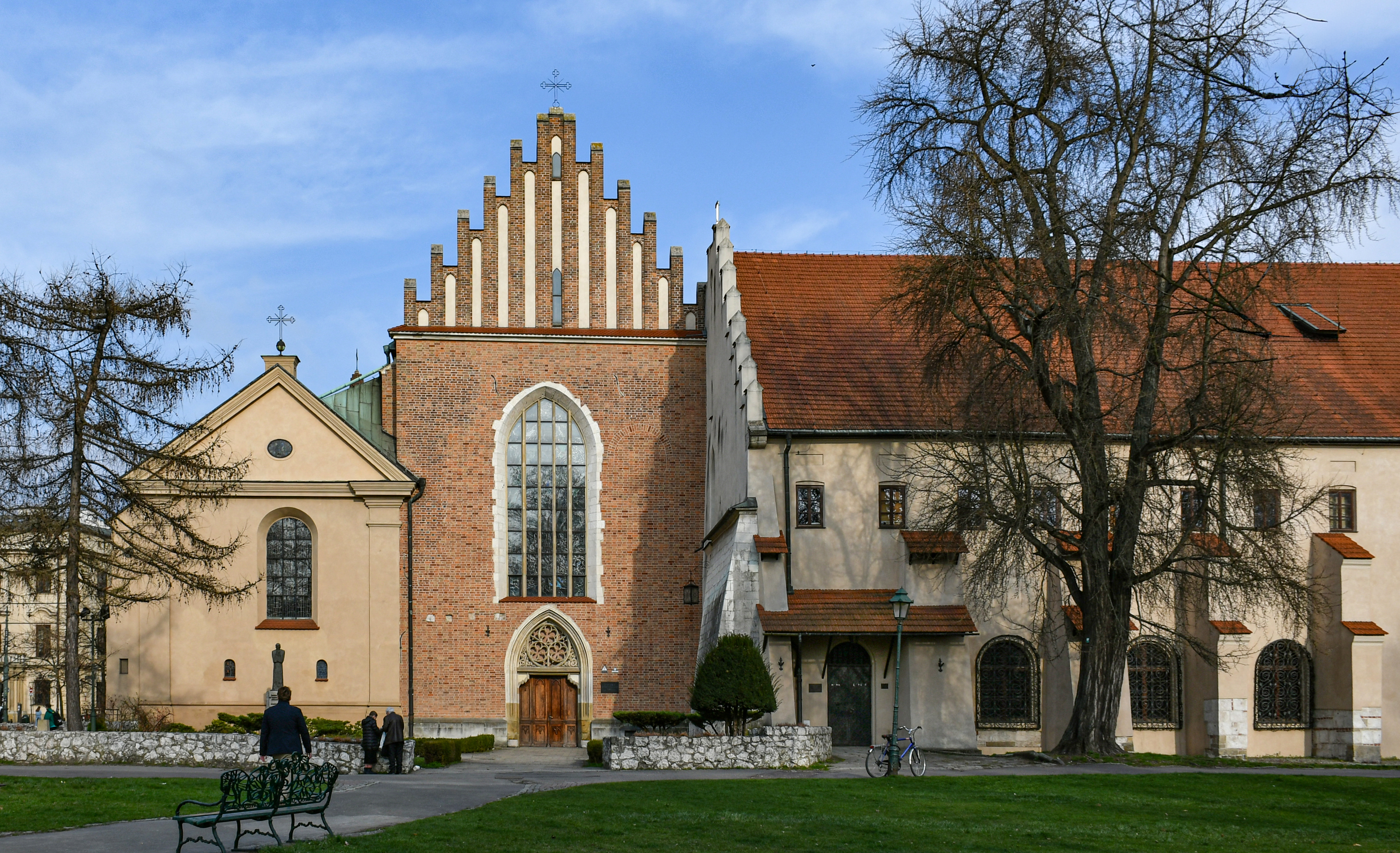
Church of St. Francis of Assisi

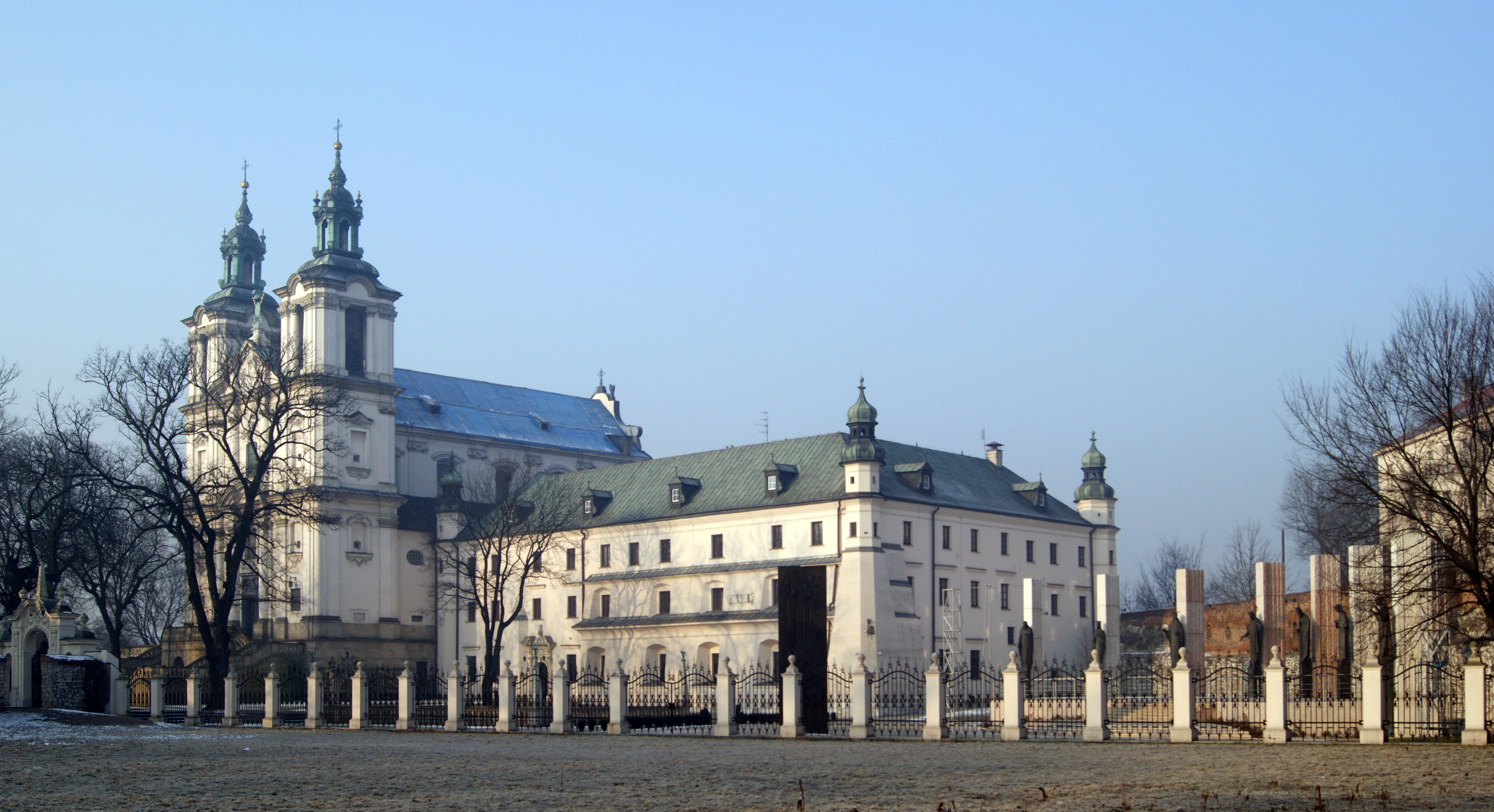
Church of St. Michael the Archangel and St. Stanislaus Bishop and Martyr, Skałka

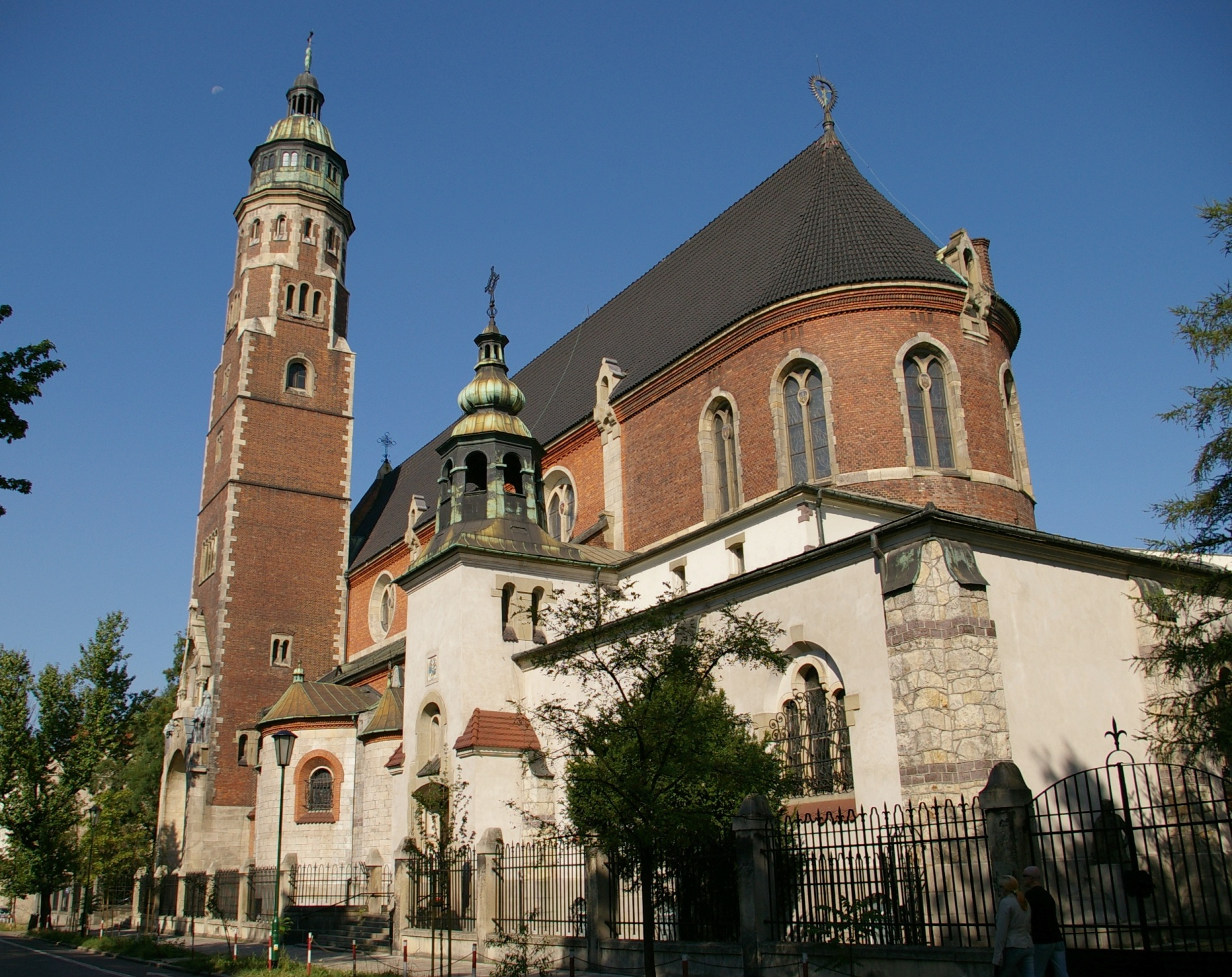
Basilica of the Sacred Heart of Jesus

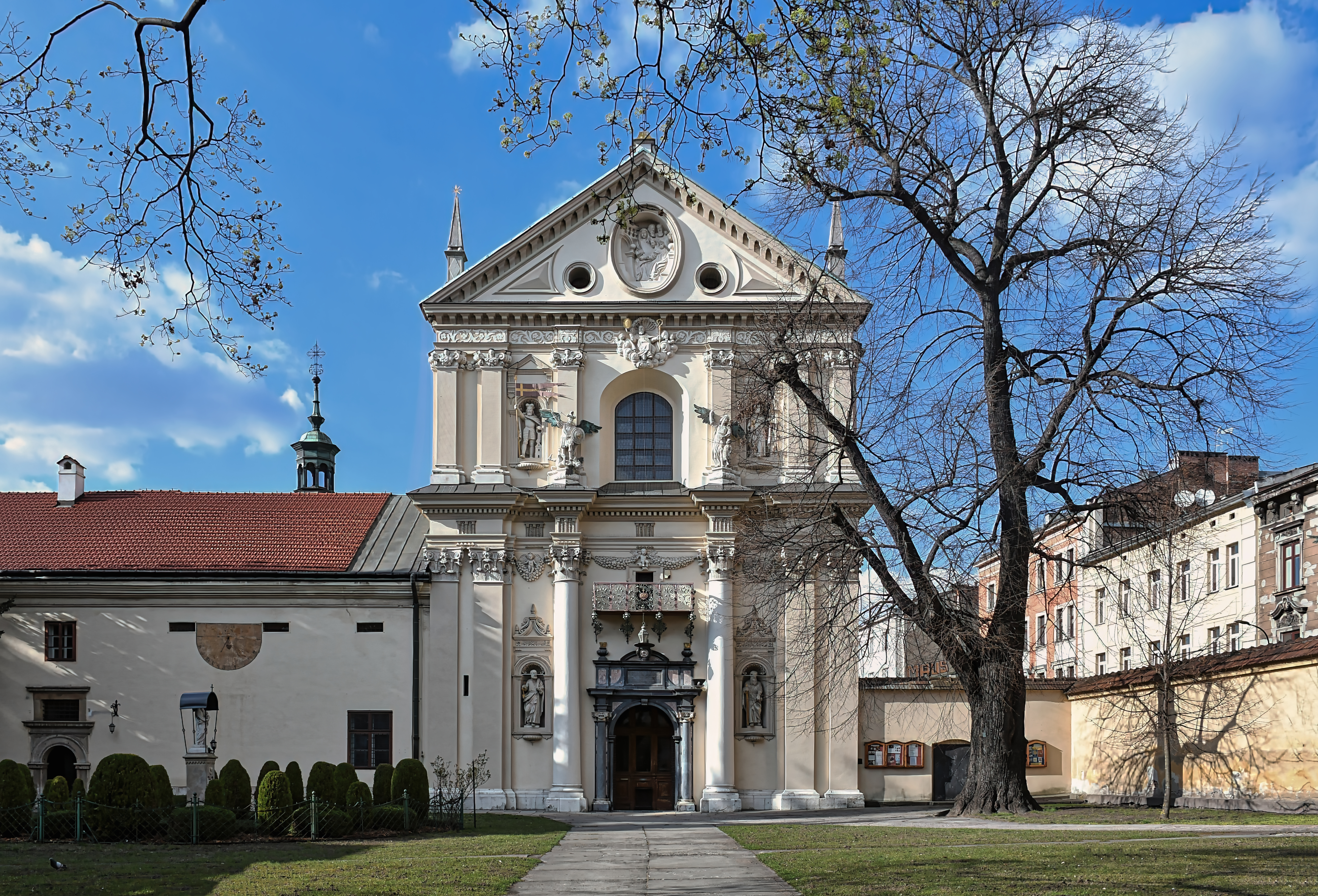
Church of St. Francis de Sales
16 Krowoderska Street

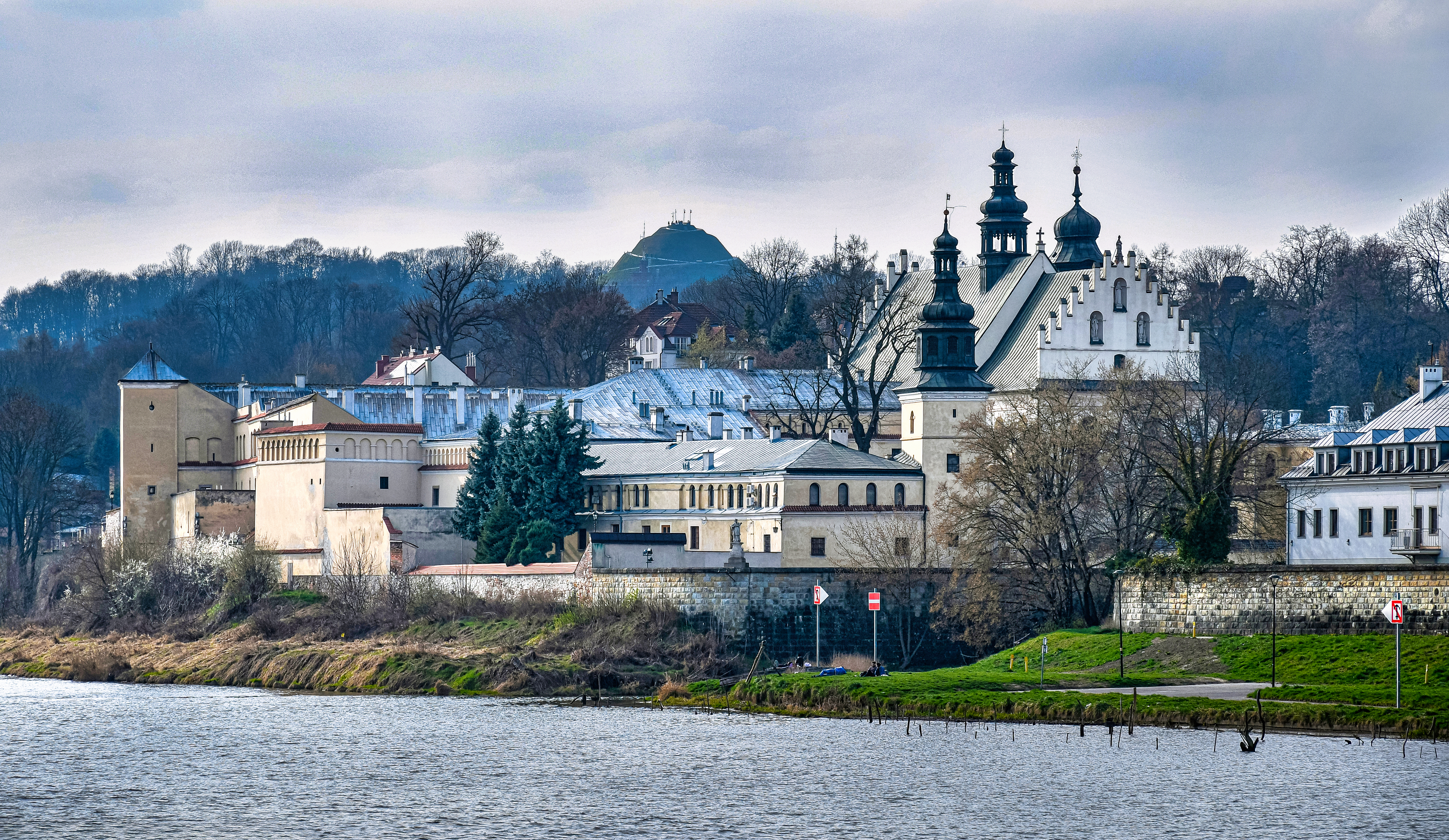
Church of St. Augustine and St. John the Baptist, Zwierzyniec

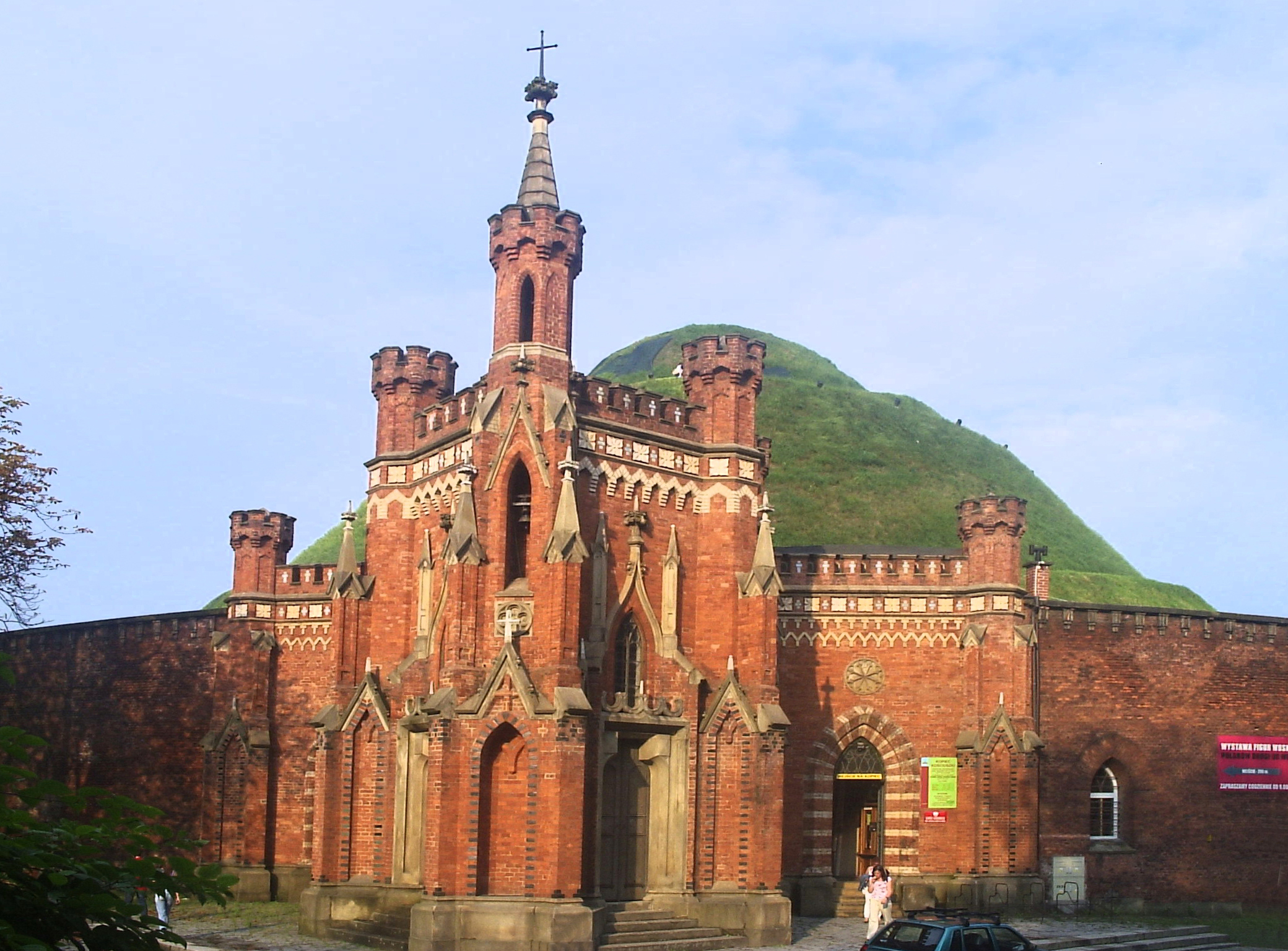
Blessed Bronisława Chapel

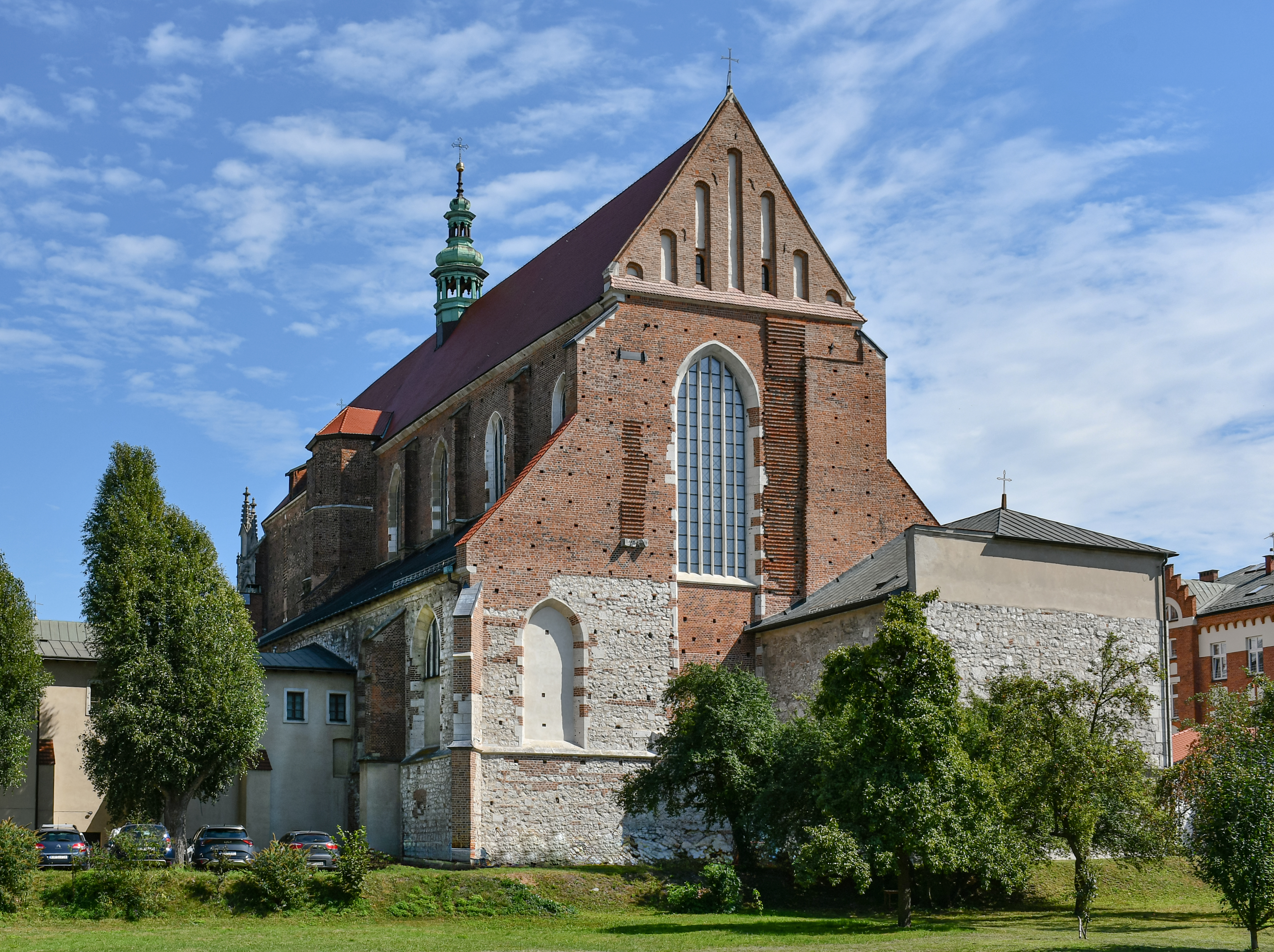
Church of St. Catherine of Alexandria and St. Margaret
Kazimierz

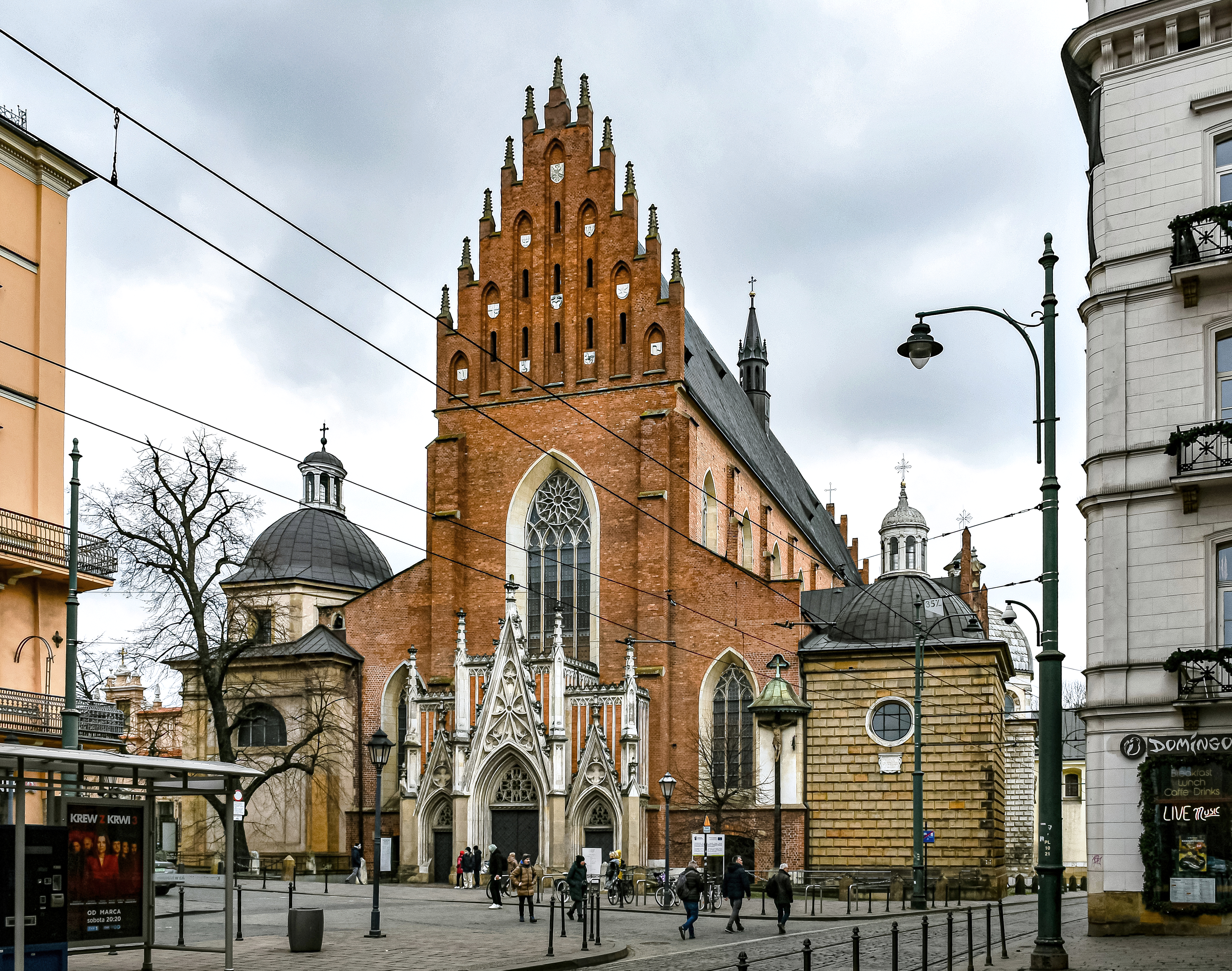
Church of the Holy Trinity
12 Stolarska Street

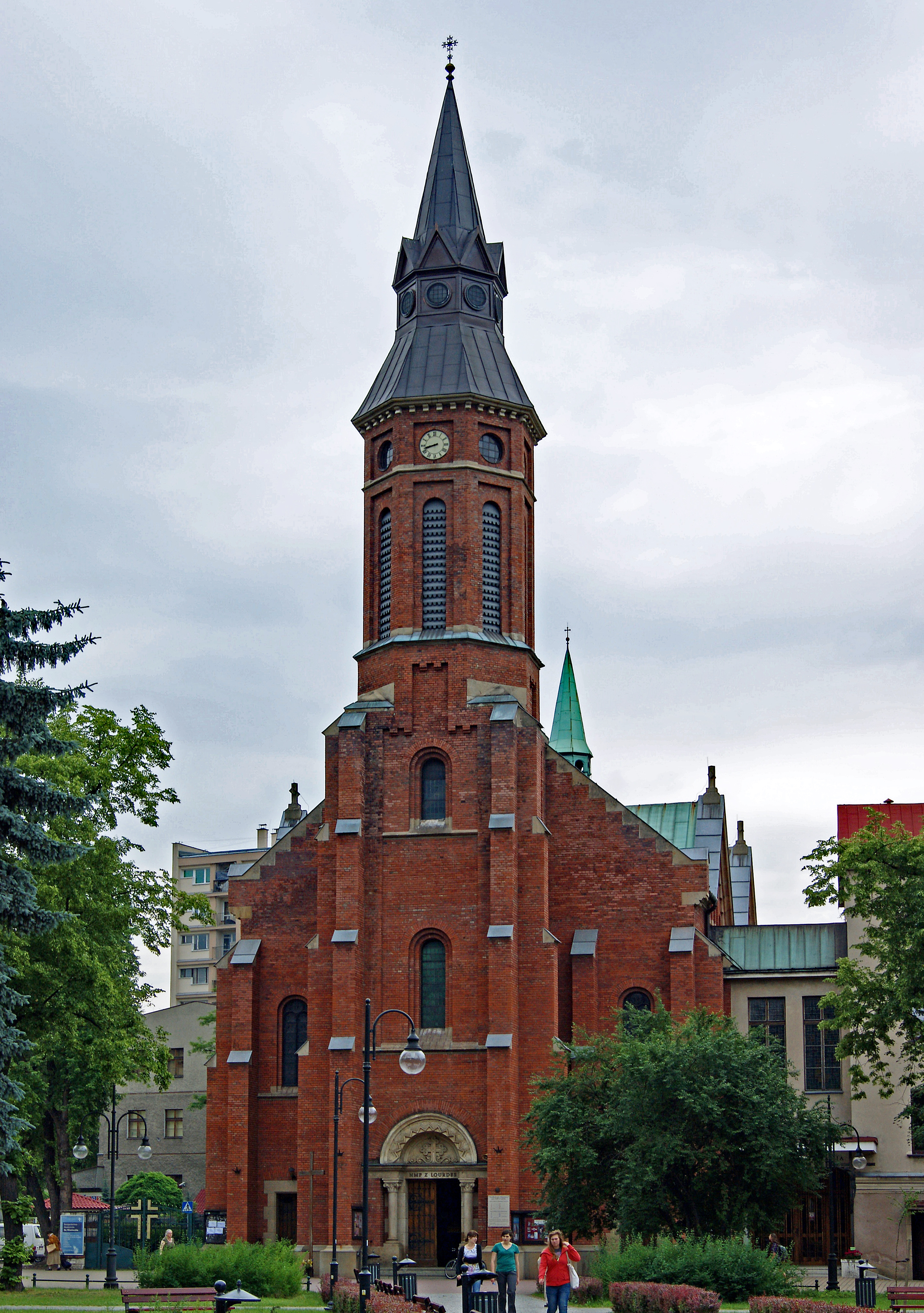
Church of the Holy Virgin Mary of Lourdes

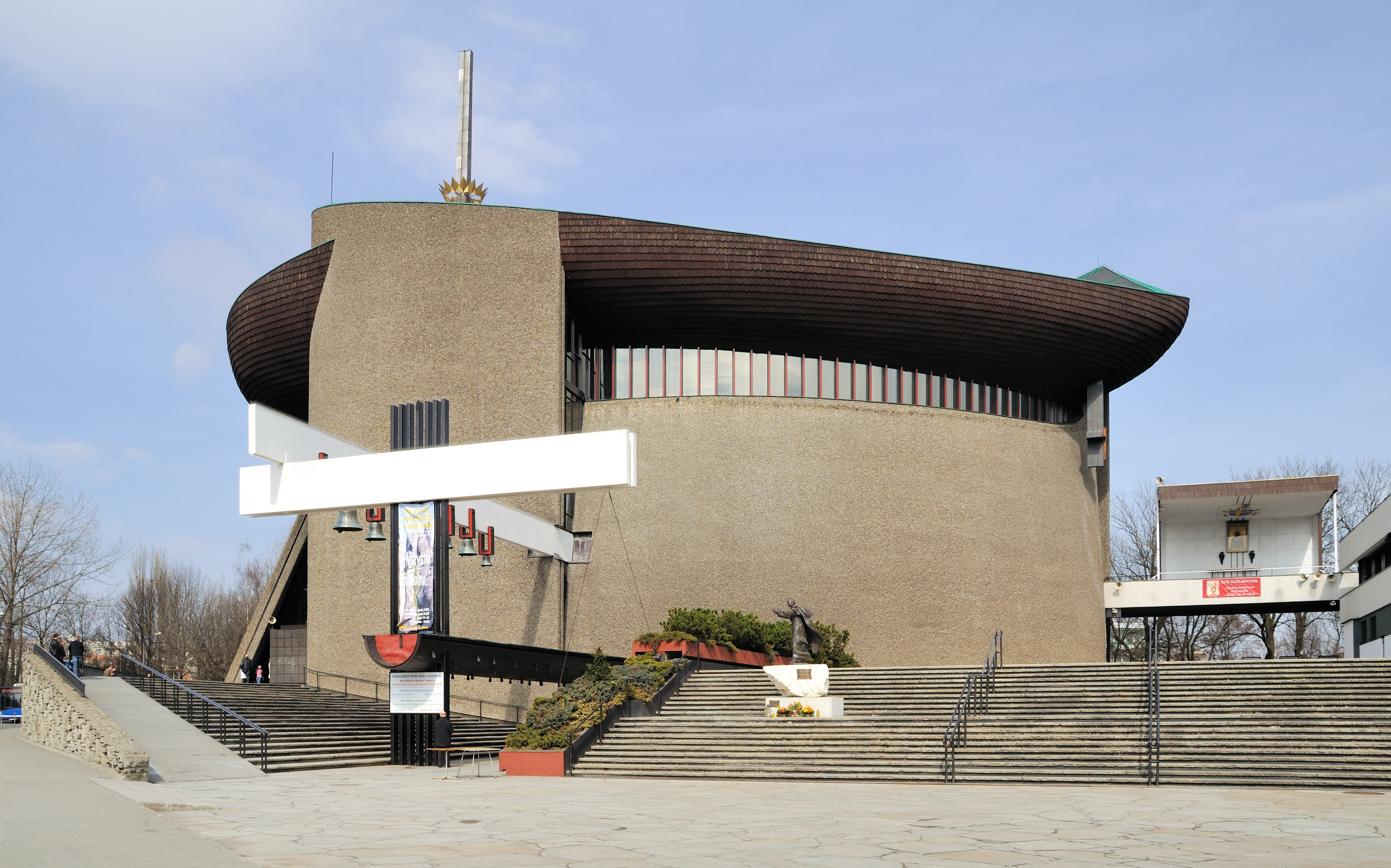
Our Lady Queen of Poland (Arka Pana) Church
Nowa Huta

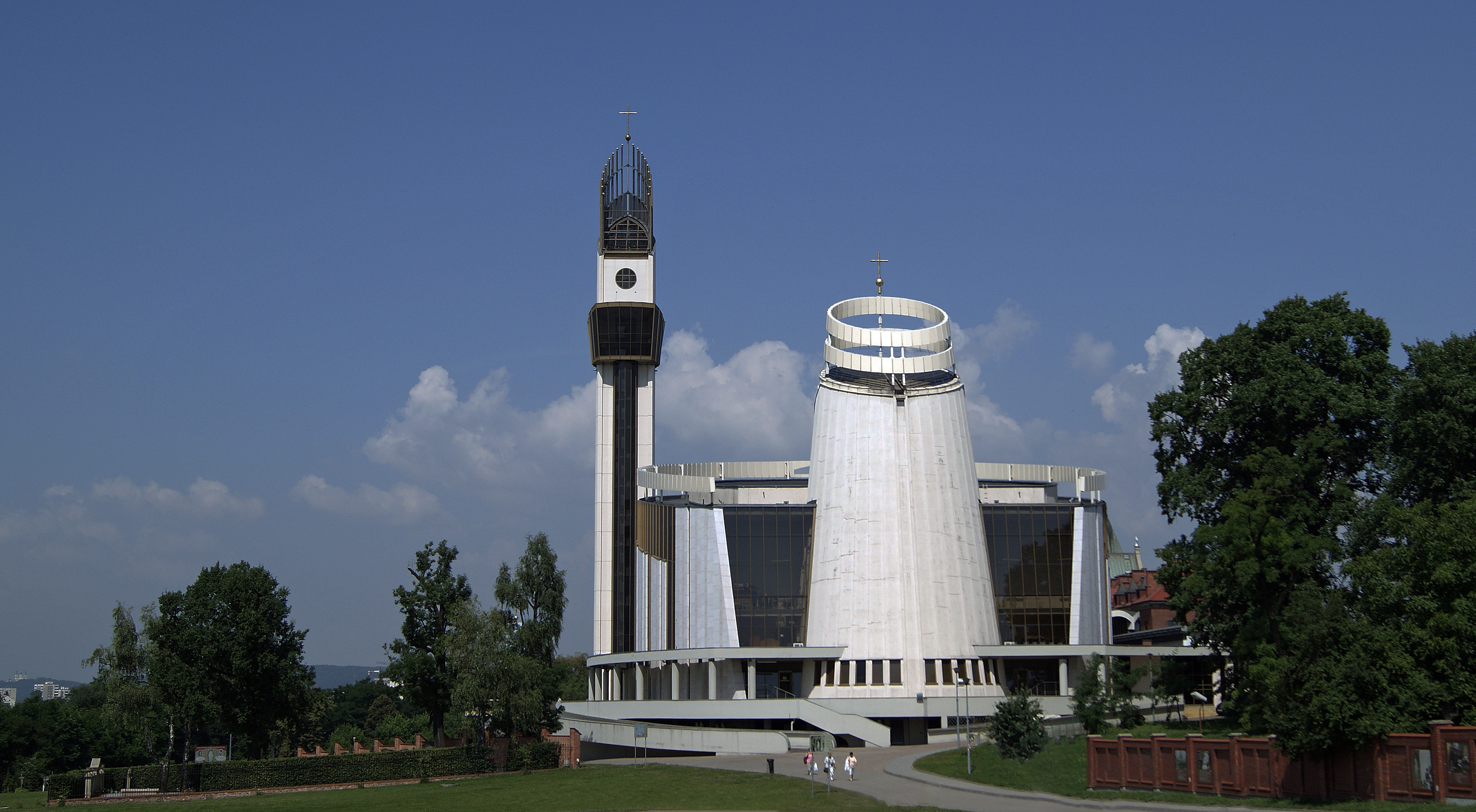
Divine Mercy Church, Łagiewniki

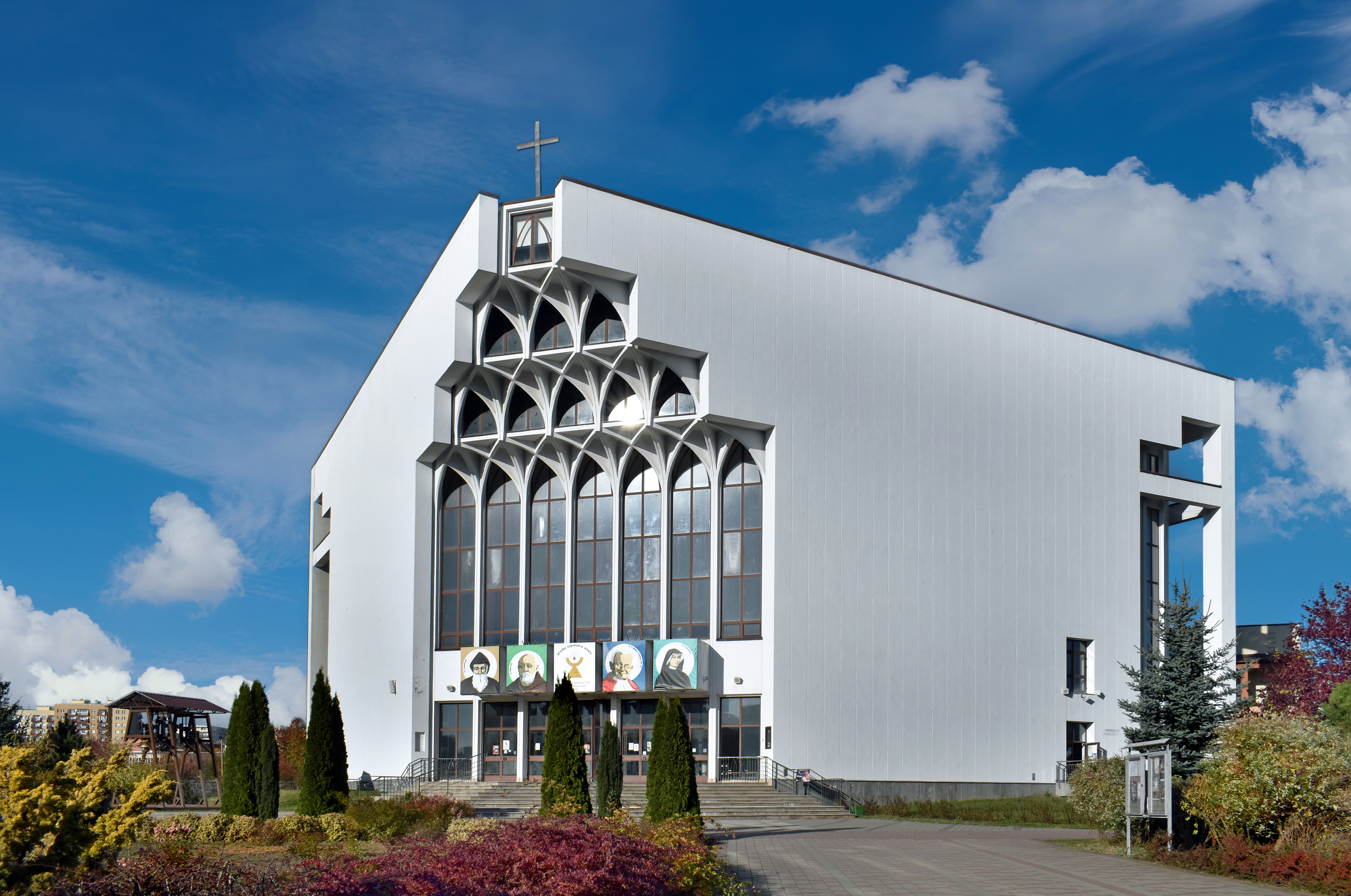
Church of St. Albert Chmielowski
63 Dywizjonu 303

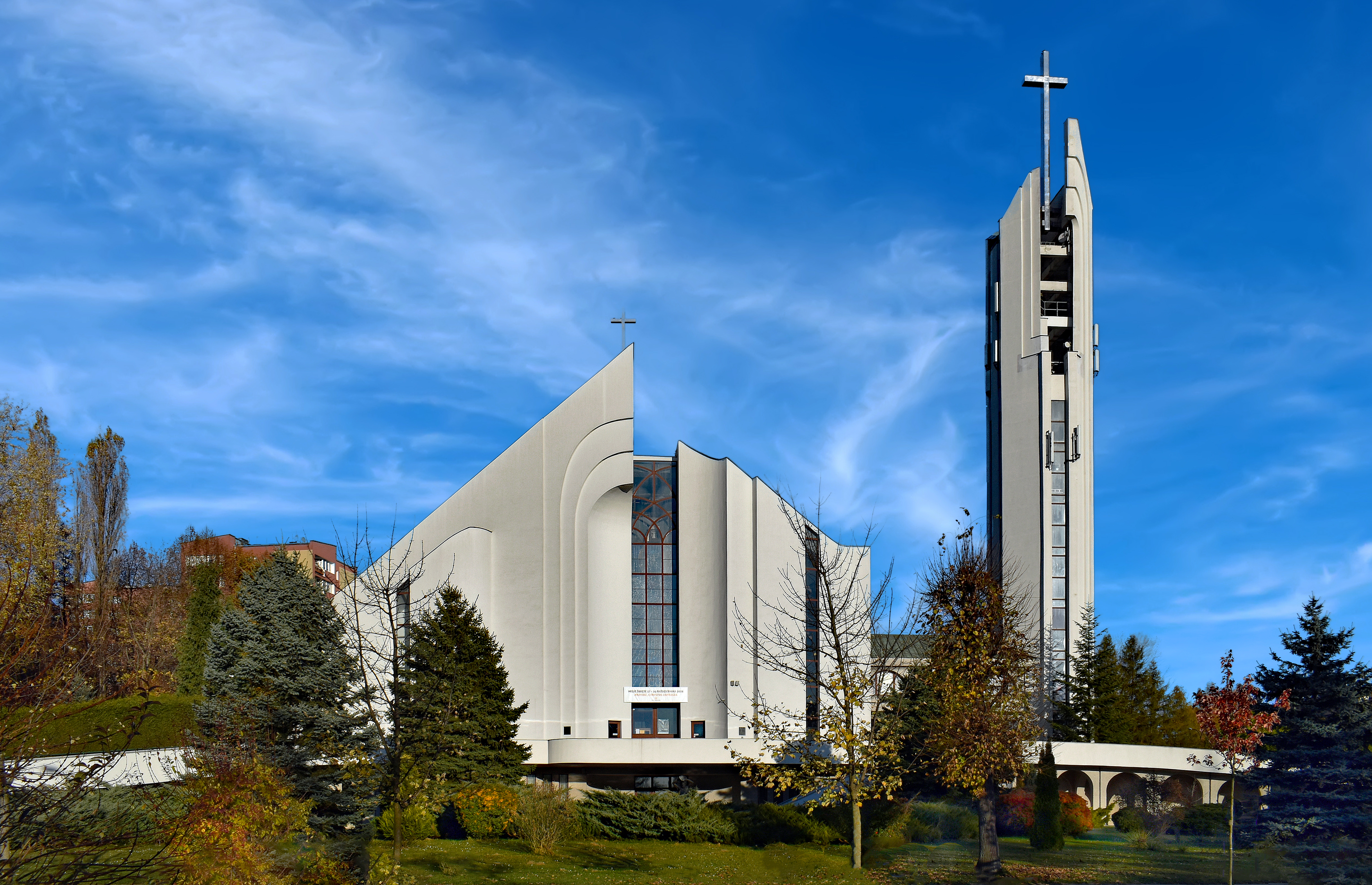
Divine Mercy Church
1a Na Wzgórzach

== Churches of other denominations ==
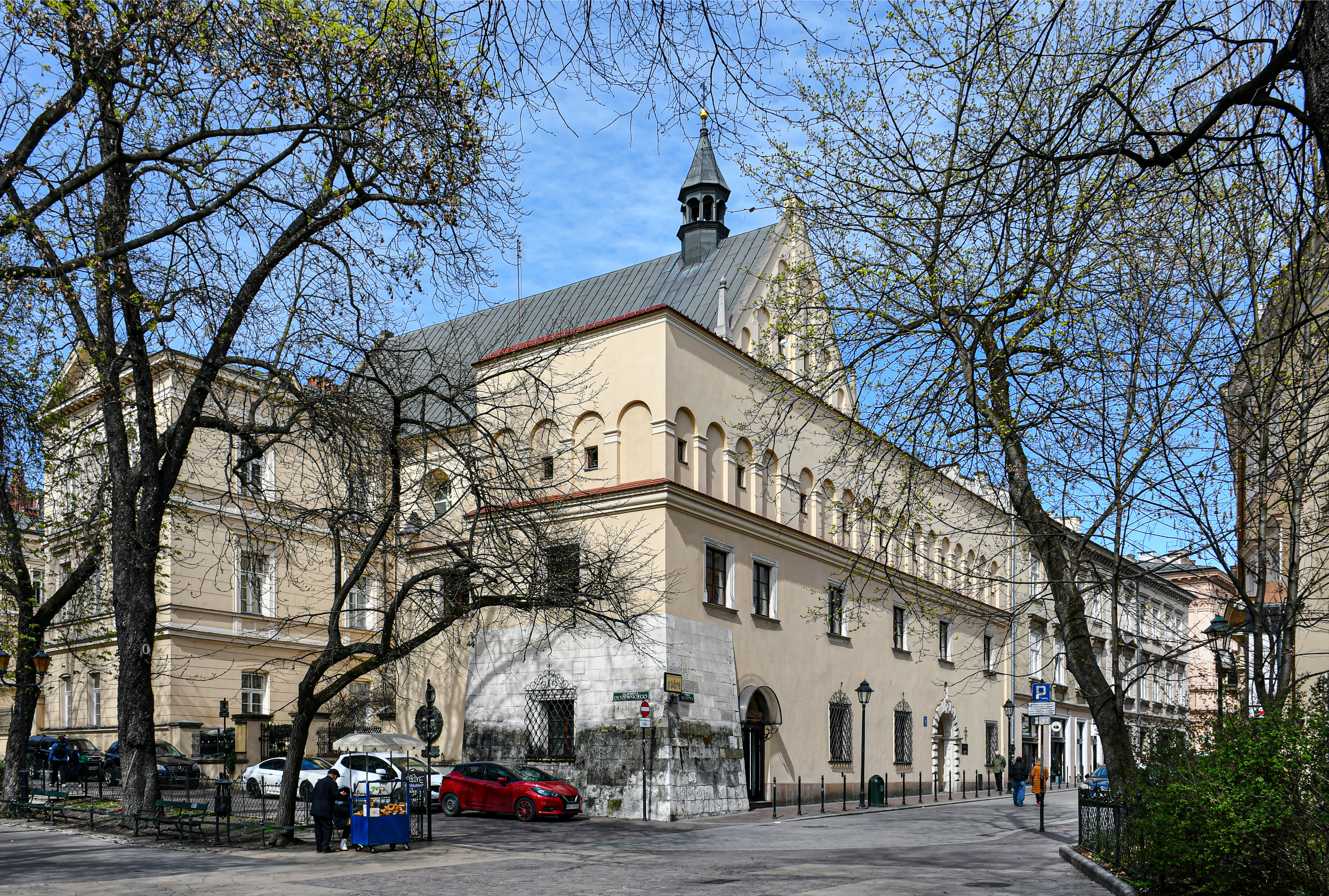
Greek Catholic
Tserkov of the Exaltation of the Holy Cross
11 Wiślna Street

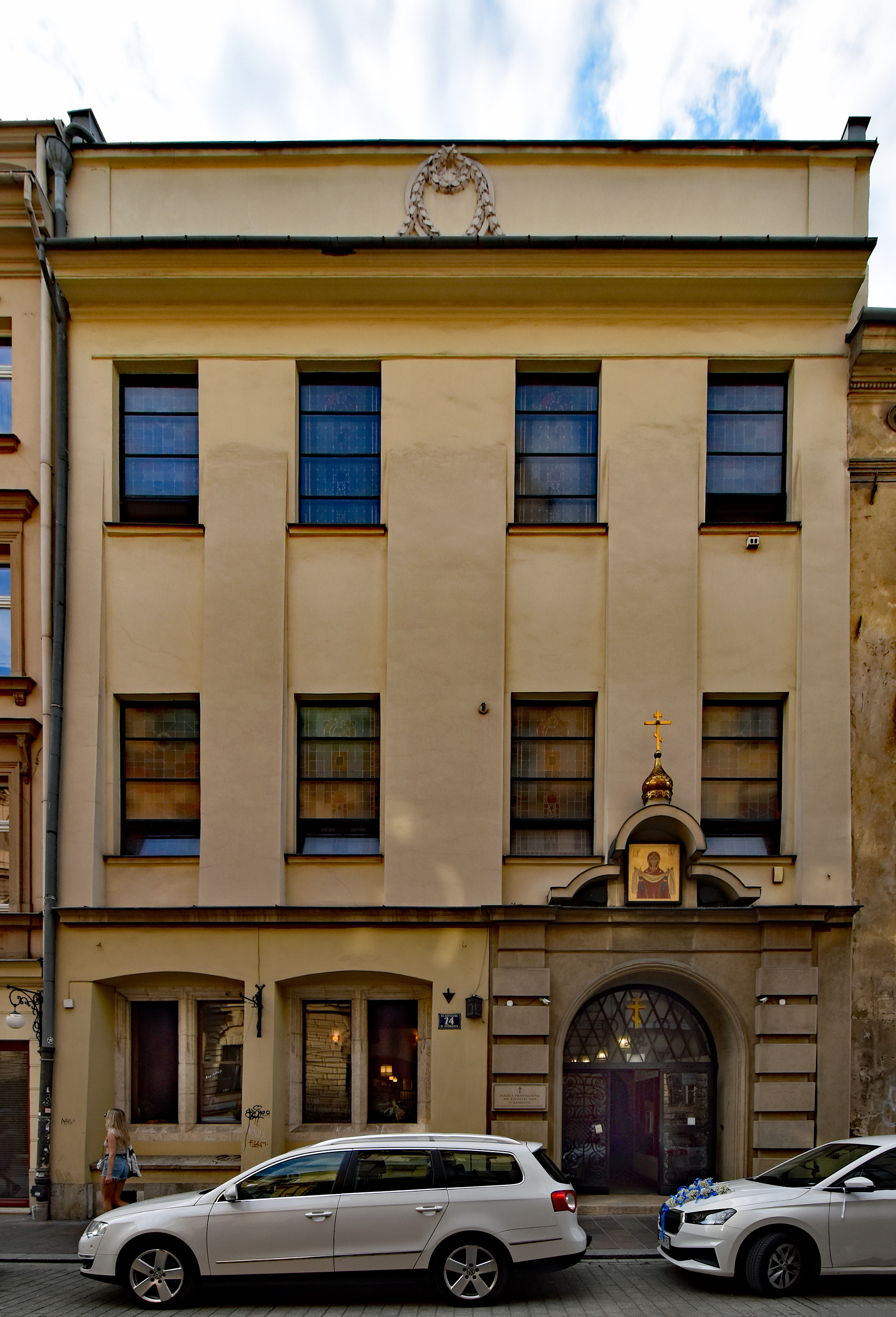
Eastern Orthodox
Tserkov of the Dormition of the Mother of God
24 Szpitalna Street

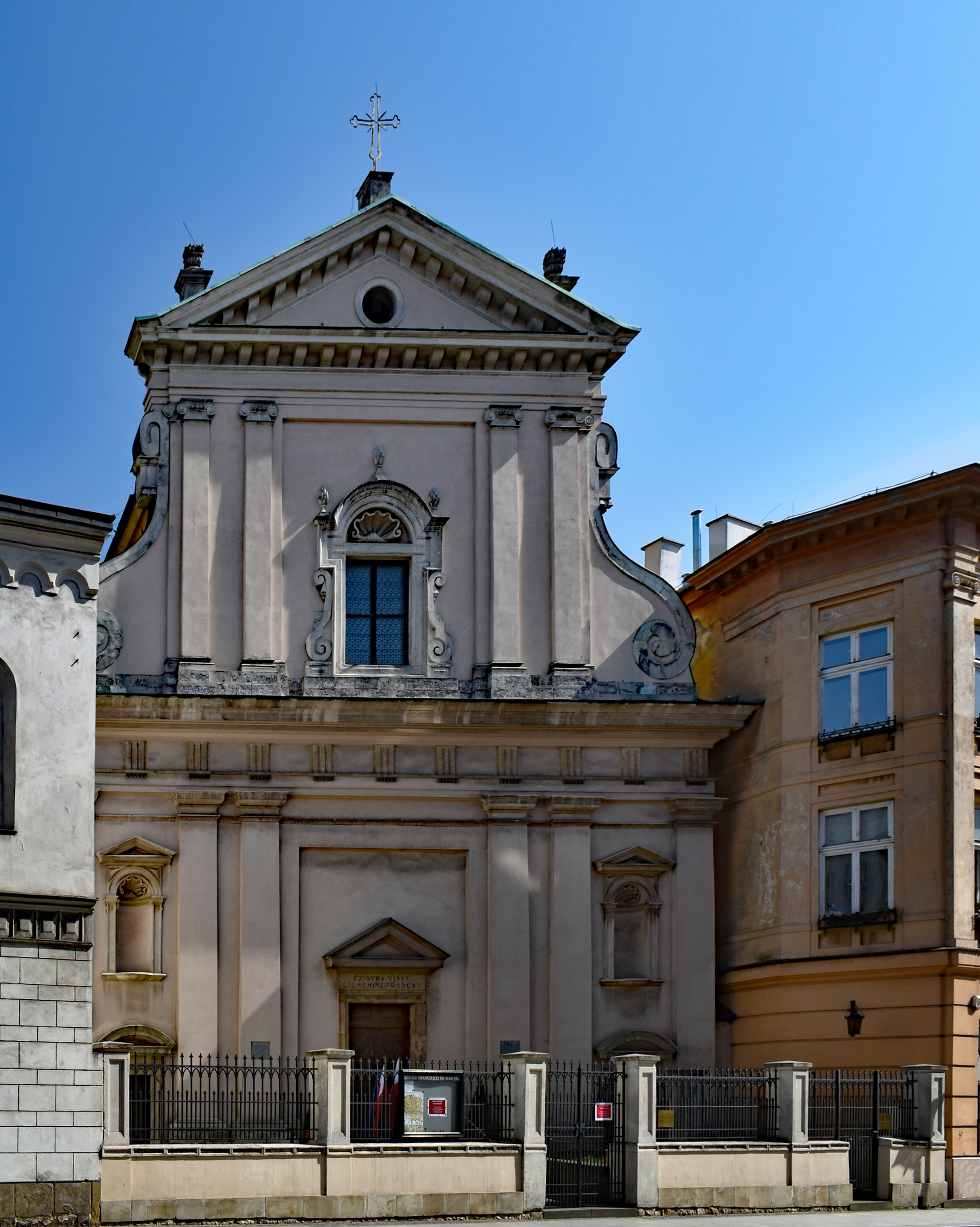
Evangelical Augsburg
Church of St. Martin
56 Grodzka Street

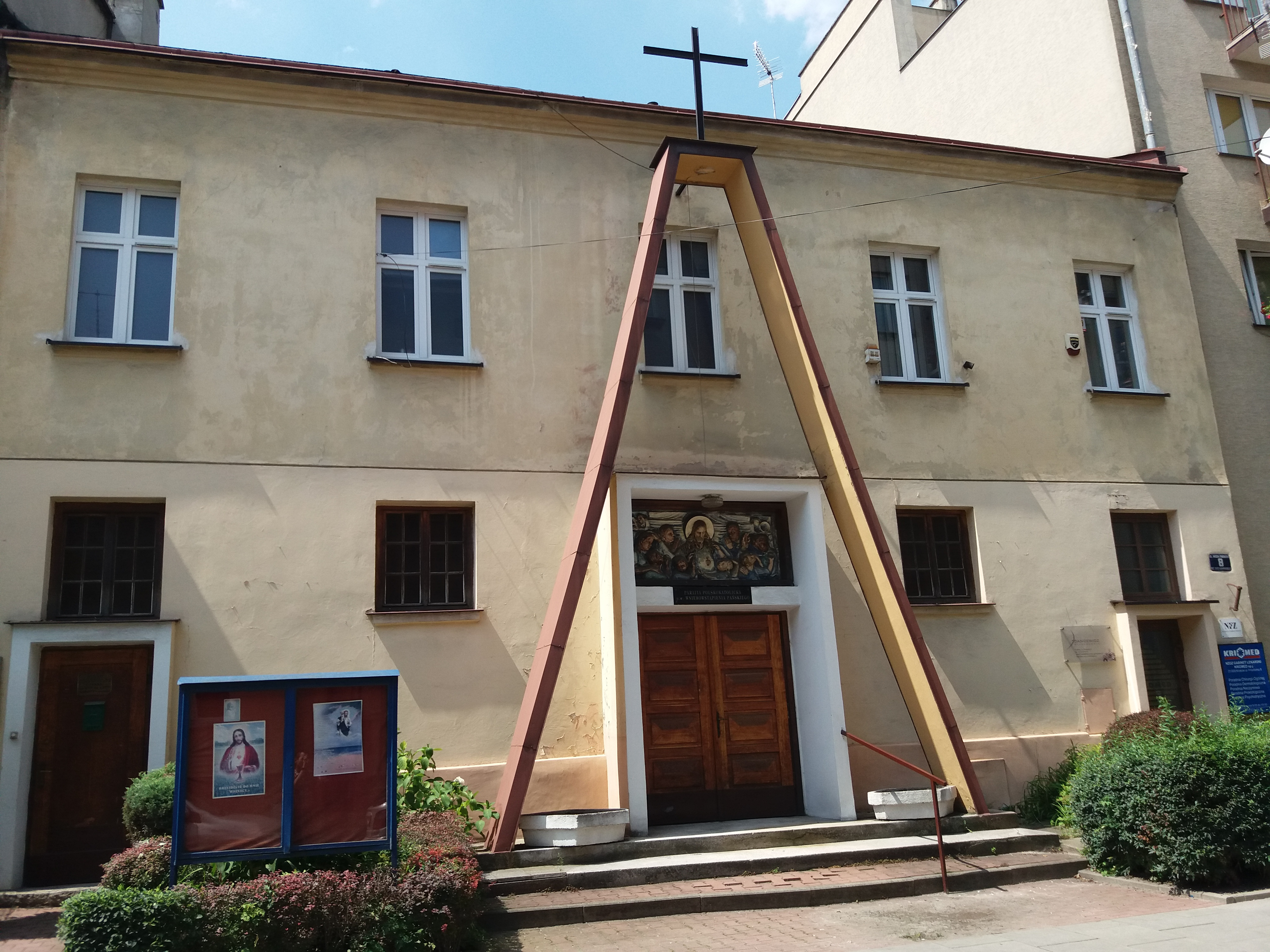
Polish-Catholic
Church of the Feast of the Ascension of Jesus Christ
8 Józefa Friedleina Street

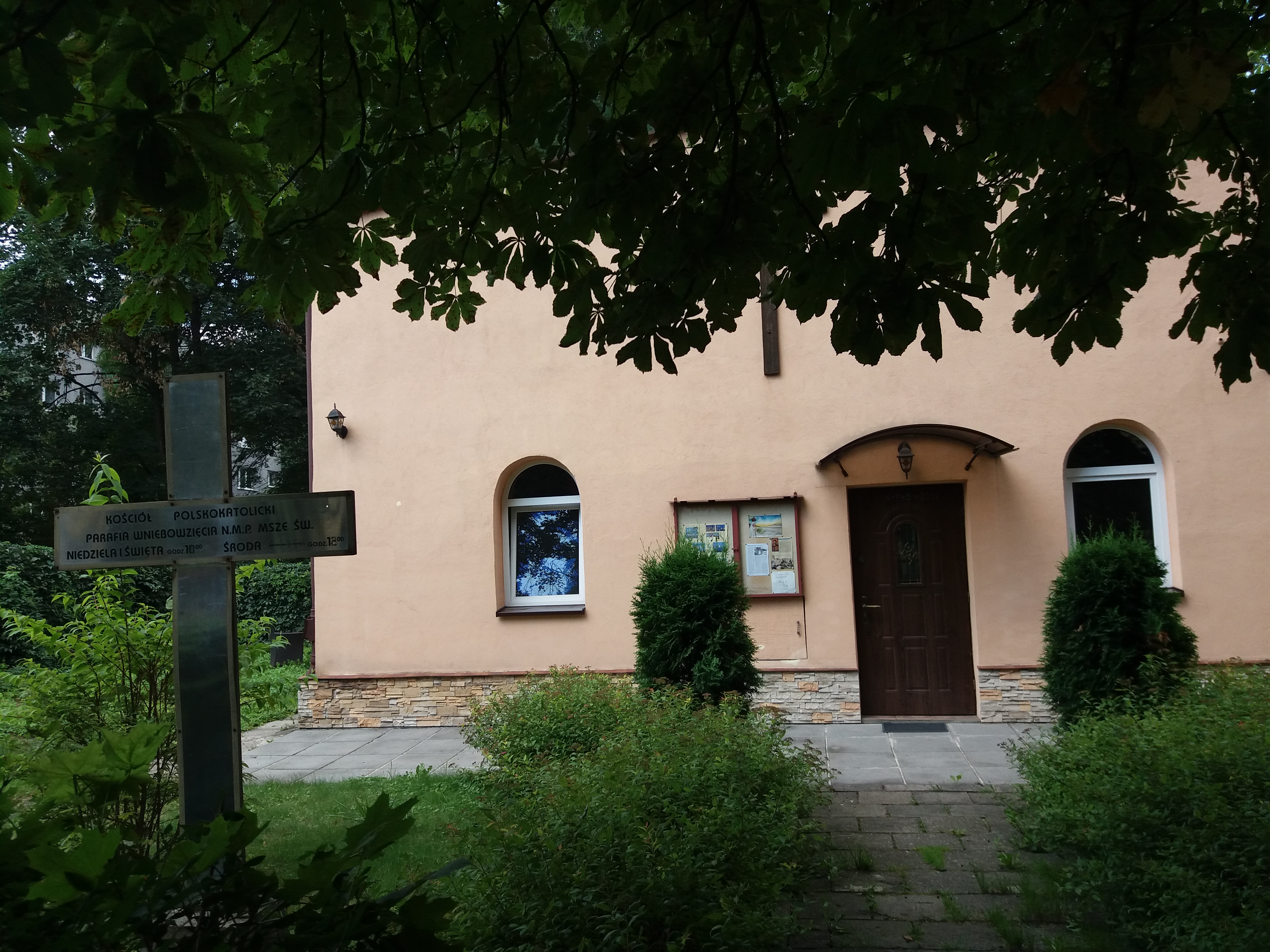
Polish-Catholic
Church of the Assumption of Mary
19 Macieja Miechowity Street

== List of churches of Kraków in alphabetical order ==
For list of churches by street name, please use table-sort buttons.

The following list contains the complete list of Roman Catholic churches in and around the city of Kraków, including churches which were Roman Catholic in the past, and today are under the care of other religious denominations.

#	Name	Function	Wardship	Street
1	St. Agnes' Church	Garrison	-	ul. Dietla 30
2	St. Andrew's Church	-	Klaryski	ul. Grodzka 54
3	Church of Blessed Angela Salawa	-	Misjonarze	ul. Kijowska 29
4	Church of St. Anne	Collegiate	-	ul. św. Anny 11
5	Church of St. Anthony of Padua	-	-	ul. Pod Strzechą 16
6	Church of St. Augustine and St. John the Baptist	-	Norbertanki	ul. Kościuszki 88
7	St. Barbara's Church	-	Jesuits	Mały Rynek 8
8	St. Bartholomew's Church	-	Cistercians	ul. Klasztorna 11 (Mogiła)
9	St. Bartholomew's Church	-	-	ul. Komandosów 25
10	St. Benedict's Church	-	-	Wzgórze Lasoty
11	Kościół św. Bernardyna	-	Bernardines	ul. Bernardyńska 2
12	Kościół Boskiego Zbawiciela	-	Salwatorianie	ul. św. Jacka 16
13	Corpus Christi Basilica	Minor Basilica (2005)	Canons Regular of the Lateran	ul. Bożego Ciała 26
14	Divine Mercy Sanctuary	Minor Basilica (2003)	-	ul. Siostry Faustyny 3
15	Sanktuarium Bożego Miłosierdzia	-	Siostry Matki Miłosierdzia	ul. Siostry Faustyny 3
16	Kościół Bożego Miłosierdzia	-	-	ul. Miłosierdzia Bożego 1
17	Kościół św. Brata Alberta	-	-	os. Dywizjonu 303 nr 14
18	Kościół św. Brata Alberta	-	Albertine Sisters	ul. Woronicza 10
19	Kaplica bł. Bronisławy	-	-	Kościuszko Mound
20	Kościół Chrystusa Króla	-	Jesuits	ul. Zaskale 1
21	Kaplica Chrystusa Króla	-	-	Cmentarz Batowicki
22	Kościół Chrystusa Odkupiciela Człowieka	-	-	ul. Gen. Kiwerskiego 2
23	St. Florian's Church	Minor Basilica (1999)	-	ul. Warszawska 1b
24	Church of St. Francis of Assisi	Minor Basilica (1919)	Franciscans	pl. Wszystkich Świętych 5
25	Kościół św. Franciszka Salezego	-	Wizytki	ul. Krowoderska 16
26	Kościół św. Grzegorza Wielkiego	-	-	ul. Jeziorko 40
27	Kościół św. Idziego	-	Dominicans	ul. Grodzka 67
28	Kościół św. Jadwigi Królowej	-	-	ul. Zagaje 42 (Osiedle Kliny)
29	Kościół św. Jadwigi Królowej	-	-	ul. Łokietka 60
30	Kościół św. Jana Chrzciciela	-	-	ul. Dobrego Pasterza 116
31	Kościół św. Jana Chrzciciela	-	-	ul. Wańkowicza 35
32	Kościół św. Jana Chrzciciela i św. Jana Ewangelisty	-	Prezentki	ul. św. Jana 7
33	Kościół św. Jana Kantego	-	-	ul. Jabłonkowska 18
34	St. Joseph's Church	-	-	ul. Zamojskiego 2
35	Kościół św. Józefa	-	Bernardine Sisters	ul. Poselska 21
36	Kościół św. Józefa	-	-	os. Kalinowe 5
37	Kościół św. Judy Tadeusza	-	-	ul. Wężyka 6
38	Kościół św. Karola Boromeusza	-	-	ul. Zdrowa
39	Kościół św. Katarzyny Aleksandryjskiej i św. Małgorzaty	-	Augustinians	ul. Augustiańska 7
40	Kościół św. Kazimierza Królewicza	-	pl:reformaci	ul. Reformacka 4
41	Kościół św. Kazimierza	-	-	ul. Podgórki Tynieckie 96
42	Kościół św. Kazimierza	-	-	ul. Bobrowskiego 6
43	Kościół św. Krzyża	-	-	ul. św. Krzyża 23
44	Kościół św. Maksymiliana Marii Kolbego	-	-	os. Tysiąclecia 86
45	Kaplica Małgorzaty i św. Judyty	-	-	ul. Bronisławy 8
46	St. Martin's Church	-	Evangelical Church of the Augsburg Confession in Poland	ul. Grodzka 58
47	Kościół św. Marii Magdaleny	-	-	ul. Niebieska 56
48	Kościół św. Marka	-	-	ul. św. Marka 10
49	Kościół Matki Boskiej Częstochowskiej	-	Cistercians	os. Szklane Domy 7
50	Kościół Matki Boskiej Częstochowskiej	-	Kapucyni	ul. Korzeniaka 16
51	Kościół Matki Boskiej Częstochowskiej	-	-	ul. Biwakowa
52	Kościół Matki Boskiej Dobrej Rady	-	-	ul. Prosta 1
53	Kościół Matki Boskiej Fatimskiej	-	-	ul. Komandosów 18
54	Kościół Matki Bożej Królowej Polski	-	-	ul. Kobierzyńska 199
55	Kościół Matki Bożej Królowej Polski (Arka Pana)	-	-	ul. Obrońców Krzyża 1
56	Kościół Matki Boskiej Nieustającej Pomocy	-	-	ul. Hemara 1
57	Kościół Matki Boskiej Nieustającej Pomocy	-	Redemptoryści	ul. Zamojskiego 56
58	Kościół Matki Boskiej Nieustającej Pomocy	-	-	ul. Ks. J. Poniatowskiego 176
59	Kościół Matki Boskiej Nieustającej Pomocy	-	-	os. Bohaterów Września 33
60	Kościół Matki Boskiej Ostrobramskiej	-	Pijarzy	ul. Meissnera 20
61	Kościół Matki Boskiej Różańcowej	-	-	ul. Skotnicka 139a
62	Kościół Matki Boskiej Różańcowej	-	-	ul. Nowosądecka 41
63	Kościół Matki Boskiej Śnieżnej	-	Dominican Sisters	ul. Mikołajska 21
64	Basilica of the Holy Cross (Mogiła Abbey)	Minor Basilica (1970)	Cistercians	ul. Klasztorna 11
65	Kościół Matki Boskiej Zwycięskiej	-	-	ul. Zakopiańska 86
66	Church of Saint Michael the Archangel and Saint Stanislaus the Bishop and Martyr (Skałka)	Minor Basilica (2003)	Pauline Fathers	ul. Skałeczna 15
67	Kościół św. Mikołaja	-	-	ul. Kopernika 9
68	Kościół Miłosierdzia Bożego	-	-	ul. Kuczaba 5
69	Kościół Miłosierdzia Bożego	-	-	pl. E. Raczyńskiego 1
70	Kościół Miłosierdzia Bożego	-	-	os. Wzg. Krzesławickie 1
71	Kościół Najświętszego Imienia Maryi	-	Pijarzy	ul. Dzielskiego 1
72	Church of the Holy Virgin Mary of Lourdes	-	pl:misjonarze	ul. Misjonarska 37
73	Kościół Najświętszej Maryi Panny Matki Kościoła	-	-	ul. Pasteura 1
74	Kościół Najświętszej Rodziny	-	-	ul. Aleksandry 1
75	Kościół Najświętszego Salwatora	-	-	ul. bł. Bronisławy 9
76	Kościół Najświętszego Serca Pana Jezusa	-	-	ul. Cechowa 144
77	Kościół Najświętszego Serca Pana Jezusa	-	Sercanki	ul. Garncarska 24/26
78	Kościół Najświętszego Serca Pana Jezusa	-	Sercanie	ul. Saska 2
79	Kościół Najświętszego Serca Pana Jezusa	-	Szarytki	ul. Warszawska 8
80	Kościół Najświętszego Serca Pana Jezusa	-	-	ul. Myślenicka 13
81	Kościół Najświętszego Serca Pana Jezusa	-	-	ul. Ludźmierska 2
82	Kościół Najświętszego Serca Pana Jezusa	-	-	ul. Wzgórze 33
83	Kościół Narodzenia Najświętszej Maryi Panny	-	-	ul. Popiełuszki 35
84	Church of the Visitation of the Blessed Virgin Mary	Minor Basilica (1996)	Carmelites	ul. Karmelicka 19
85	Kościół Nawrócenia św. Pawła	-	Misjonarze	ul. Stradomska 4
86	Kościół Niepokalanego Poczęcia Najświętszej Maryi Panny	-	Karmelici bosi	ul. Rakowicka 18
87	Kościół Niepokalanego Poczęcia Najświętszej Maryi Panny (św. Łazarza)	-	-	ul. Kopernika 19
88	Kościół Niepokalanego Poczęcia Najświętszej Maryi Panny	-	Reformaci	ul. Chełmońskiego 41
89	Kościół Niepokalanego Serca Najświętszej Maryi Panny	-	Felician Sisters	ul. Smoleńsk 6
90	Kościół Niepokalanego Serca Najświętszej Maryi Panny	-	-	ul. Półłanki 100
91	Kościół św. Norberta	-	krakowska parafia grekokatolicka	ul. Wiślna 11
92	Kościół Opieki św. Józefa	-	Karmelitanki bose	ul. Łobzowska 40
93	Kościół Pana Jezusa Dobrego Pasterza	-	-	ul. Dobrego Pasterza 4
94	Kaplica Pielgrzymów z Emaus	-	-	ul. ks. Pawlickiego 1
95	Saints Peter and Paul Church	Minor Basilica (1960)	-	ul. Grodzka 52
96	Kościół św. Piotra i Pawła (Tyniec)	-	Benedictines	ul. Benedyktyńska 37
97	Kościół Podwyższenia Krzyża Świętego	-	-	ul. Witosa 9
98	Kościół Przemienienia Pańskiego	-	kościół rektoralny	ul. Pijarska 2
99	Kościół Przemienienia Pańskiego	-	-	ul. Bogdanowskiego 14
100	Basilica of the Sacred Heart of Jesus	Minor Basilica (1960)	Jesuits	ul. Kopernika 26
101	Archcathedral Basilica of Saint Stanislaus and Saint Wenceslaus (Wawel Cathedral)	Cathedral (18th century); Minor Basilica (Immemorial)	-	Wawel
102	Kościół św. Stanisława Biskupa i Męczennika	-	Oratorians	ul. Maciejkowa
103	Kościół św. Stanisława Biskupa i Męczennika	-	-	ul. Kantorowicka 122
104	Kościół św. Stanisława Biskupa i Męczennika	-	-	ul. Półkole 9a
105	Kościół św. Stanisława Kostki	-	Salezjanie	ul. Konfederacka 6
106	Kościół Stygmatów św. Franciszka z Asyżu	-	Reformaci	ul. Ojcowska 1
107	Kościół św. Szczepana	-	-	ul. Sienkiewicza 19
108	Kościół św. Teresy od Jezusa i św. Jana od Krzyża	-	Karmelitanki bose	ul. Kopernika 44
109	Kościół św. Tomasza Apostoła	-	Order of the Holy Ghost	ul. Szpitalna 12
110	Basilica of the Holy Trinity	Minor Basilica (1957)	Dominicans	ul. Stolarska 12
111	Kościół św. Trójcy	-	pl:bonifratrzy	ul. Krakowska 48
112	Kościół św. Wincentego à Paulo	-	pl:misjonarze	ul. Filipa 19
113	Kościół św. Wincentego i Narodzenia Najświętszej Maryi Panny	-	-	ul. Nadbrzezie 12
114	Church of the Assumption of the Blessed Virgin Mary, Kraków (St. Mary's Church)	Minor Basilica (1970)	-	pl. Mariacki 5
115	Church of the Assumption of the Blessed Virgin Mary Queen of Poland (Camaldolese Monastery)	Minor Basilica (1963)	Camaldolese	ul. Konarowa 1
116	Kościół św. Wojciecha	-	-	Rynek Główny
117	Kościół św. Wojciecha	-	-	ul. św. Wojciecha 4
118	Kościół Wszystkich Świętych	-	-	ul. Podbiałowa 6
119	Kościół Zesłania Ducha Świętego	-	-	ul. Rostworowskiego 13
120	Kościół Zmartwychwstania Pańskiego	-	Resurrectionists	ul. Łobzowska 10
121	Kościół Zmartwychwstania Pańskiego	-	Resurrectionists	ul. Szkolna 4
122	Kaplica Zmartwychwstania Pańskiego	-	-	pl:Cmentarz Rakowicki
123	Kościół Zwiastowania Najświętszej Maryi Panny	-	Kapucyni	ul. Loretańska 11

== List of inactive churches ==
For list of churches arranged by street name, please use table-sort buttons.

#	Name	Function	Wardship	Street
1	Kościół "B"	-	-	Wawel
2	Kościół św. Andrzeja	Parish	-	Tyniec
3	Kościół św. Ducha	-	Duchacy	Old Town, plac św. Ducha
4	Kościół św. Filipa i św. Jakuba	Parish	-	Kleparz, ul. św. Filipa
5	Kościół św. Gereona (Marii Egipcjanki)	-	-	Wawel
6	Kościół św. Gertrudy	Cemetery	-	ul. św. Gertrudy
7	Kościół św. Jadwigi	-	Bożogrobcy	Stradom, ul. Stradom
8	Kościół św. Jakuba Apostoła	Parish	-	Kazimierz, ul. Skawińska
9	Kościół św. Jerzego	Collegiate	-	Wawel
10	Kościół św. Kazimierza	-	Reformaci	Garbary
11	Kościół św. Krzyża	-	Benedyktyni słowiańscy	Kleparz, pl. Słowiański
12	Kościół św. Leonarda	Hospital	-	Kazimierz
13	Kościół św. Macieja i Mateusza	-	Jesuits	Old Town, pl. Szczepański
14	Kościół św. Marii Magdaleny	Parish	-	Old Town, pl. Marii Magdaleny
15	Kościół św. Michała	Collegiate	-	Wawel
16	Kościół św. Michała	-	Karmelici bosi	Old Town, ul. Poselska
17	Rotunda Najświętszej Marii Panny	-	-	Wawel
18	Kościół Najświętszej Maryi Panny Królowej Polski	-	-	al. Panieńskich Skał 18
19	Kościół Najświętszej Marii Panny na Żłobku	-	pl:Bernardyni, pl:Bazylianie	Old Town, ul. św. Jana
20	Kościół św. Piotra	-	-	Old Town, ul. Grodzka
21	Kościół św. Piotra Małego	-	Jesuits	Garbary, ul. Łobzowska
22	pl:Kościół przy bastionie Władysława IV	-	-	Wawel
23	pl:Kościół przy Baszcie Sandomierskiej	-	-	Wawel
24	pl:Kościół przy Smoczej Jamie	-	-	Wawel
25	Kościół św. Rocha	Hospital	-	Old Town, pl. św. Ducha
26	Kościół św. Scholastyki	-	Benedectine Sisters	Old Town, ul. św. Krzyża
27	Kościół św. Sebastiana i Rocha	Hospital	-	ul. św. Sebastiana
28	Kościół św. Szczepana	Parish	Jesuits	Old Town, pl. Szczepański
29	Kościół św. Szymona i Judy	-	-	Kleparz, ul. Warszawska
30	Kościół św. Tomasza	-	-	Old Town, ul. Stolarska
31	Kościół św. Urszuli	Hospital	pl:bonifratrzy	Old Town, ul. św. Jana
32	Kościół św. Walentego	Hospital	-	Kleparz, ul. Długa
33	Kościół św. Wawrzyńca	Parish	-	Kazimierz, ul. św. Wawrzyńca
34	Kościół Wszystkich Świętych	Parish	-	Old Town, pl. Wszystkich Świętych
35	Kościół św. Zofii	-	-	Kazimierz, Skałka

== See also ==
- Lesser Polish Way

== Notes and references ==
- (in Polish) Historia, opis i galeria zdjęć kościołów Krakowa
- (in Polish) Kościoły Krakowa Archived 2009-09-02 at the Wayback Machine
- (in Polish) Nieistniejące kościoły Krakowa
- Michał Rożek, B. Gondkowa, Leksykon kościołów Krakowa, Kraków 2003, ISBN 83-919281-0-1
- Media related to Churches in Kraków at Wikimedia Commons
