= Zwierzyniec, Kraków (district) =

District VII Zwierzyniec Dzielnica VII Zwierzyniec
- District of Kraków
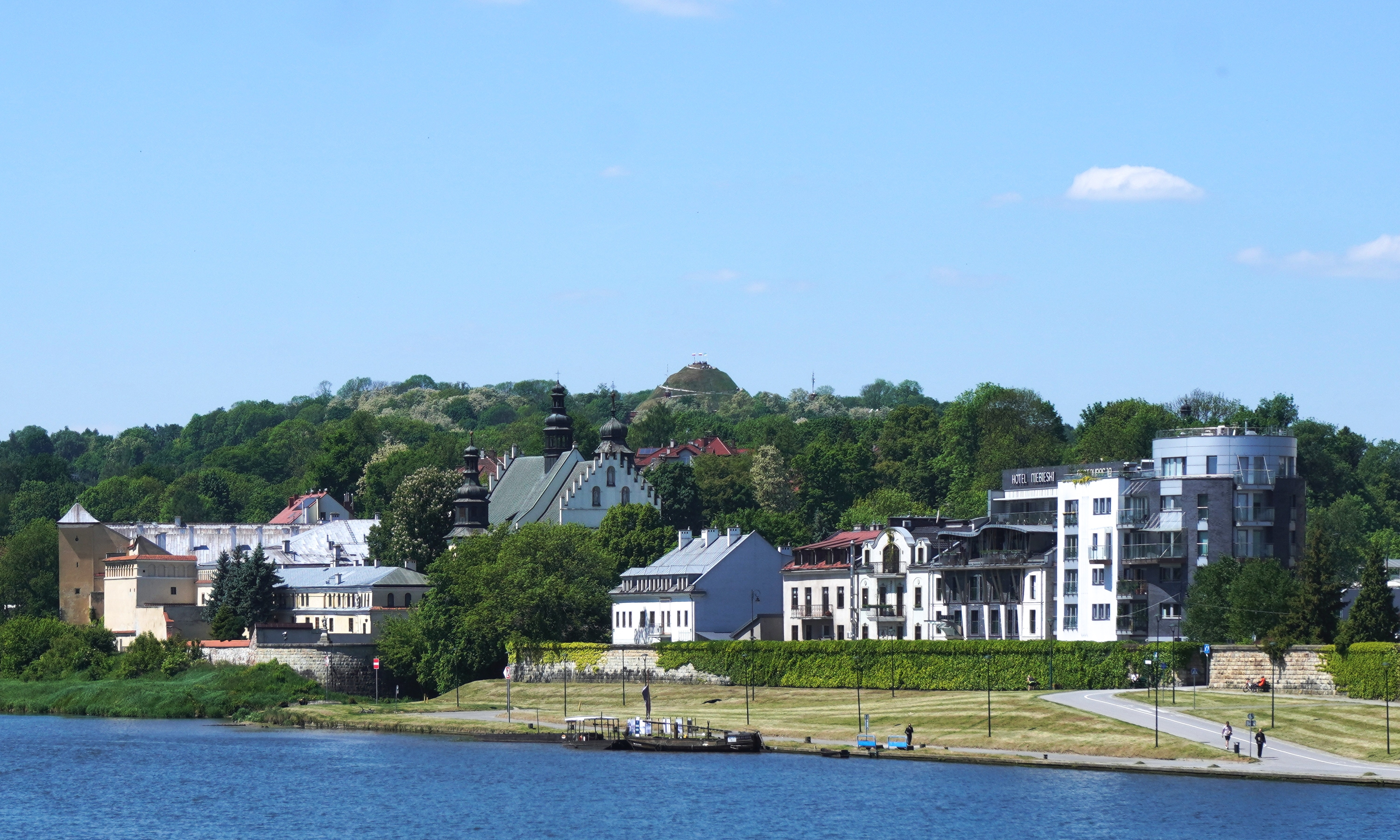
- View of Zwierzyniec from the Vistula River

- Location of Zwierzyniec within Kraków
- Coordinates: 50°3′29.7″N 19°51′53.72″E
- Country: Poland
- Voivodeship: Lesser Poland
- County/City: Kraków

Government
  - President: Szczęsny Filipiak

Area
  - Total: 28.73 km^{2} (11.09 sq mi)

Population (2014)
  - Total: 20,454
  - Density: 711.9/km^{2} (1,844/sq mi)
- Time zone: UTC+1 (CET)
  - Summer (DST): UTC+2 (CEST)
- Area code: +48 12
- Website: http://www.dzielnica7.krakow.pl

District VII Zwierzyniec (Polish: Dzielnica VII Zwierzyniec) is a district of the city of Kraków, Poland. Located in the western part of the city. The name Zwierzyniec comes from a village of same name that is now a part of the district.

According to the Central Statistical Office data, the district's area is 28.73 square kilometres (11.09 square miles) and 20 454 people inhabit Zwierzyniec.

== Subdivisions of Zwierzyniec ==
Zwierzyniec is divided into smaller subdivisions (osiedles). Here's a list of them.

- Bielany
- Chełm
- Olszanica
- Półwsie Zwierzynieckie
- Przegorzały
- Salwator
- Wola Justowska
- Zwierzyniec

== Landmarks ==
- Church of the Holy Saviour - built in the XII century in the Romanesque style and rebuilt ca. 1600 in the Post-Gothic style
- Church of St. Augustine and St. John the Baptist and Norbertine Sisters monastery - built in the XII century in the Romanesque style and rebuilt 1596–1626 in the Post-Gothic style
- Villa Decius - Renaissance villa built by Justus Ludwik Decjusz in the years 1530-1540 and rebuilt after 1620 and in the 19th century
- Camaldolese Hermit Monastery built between 1609 and 1630 in Baroque style
- Kościuszko Mound - artificial mound built 1820-1823 in honor of Tadeusz Kościuszko; between 1850 and 1854 Fort "Kosciuszko" was built around it, part of the Krakow fortress
- Piłsudski's Mound - artificial mound constructed between the years 1934 and 1937 in honor of Józef Piłsudski
- "Salwator" residential estate - a ‘garden city’ type villa estate along Świętej Bronisławy Street built between 1911 and 1955
- Przegorzały Castle - built in 1940-1941 by the occupying Nazis as a "Schloss Wartenberg" - a residence for SS-Gruppenführer Otto Wächter and Luftwaffe officers
- Baszta Villa - built 1928-1929 as a villa of Adolf Szyszko-Bohusz
- Biprocemwap - Le Corbusier-style office building designed by Wojciech Buliński and Natalia Stańko built between 1959 and 1966
- Hotel "Cracovia" - modernist hotel built between 1960-1965 according to a design by Witold Ceckiewicz; since 2016 owned by the National Museum in Krakow
- "Kijów" Cinema - designed by Witold Ceckiewicz, built 1961-1967 in modernist style
- Józef Piłsudski Cracovia Stadium - home ground of Cracovia and Puszcza Niepołomice built 1911–1912 and reconstructed 2009–2010
- Błonia - vast meadow, historically belonging to the Norbertine Nuns, now a recreation area, frequently hosting large events like concerts and exhibitions
- Kraków Zoo - established in 1929

== Gallery ==
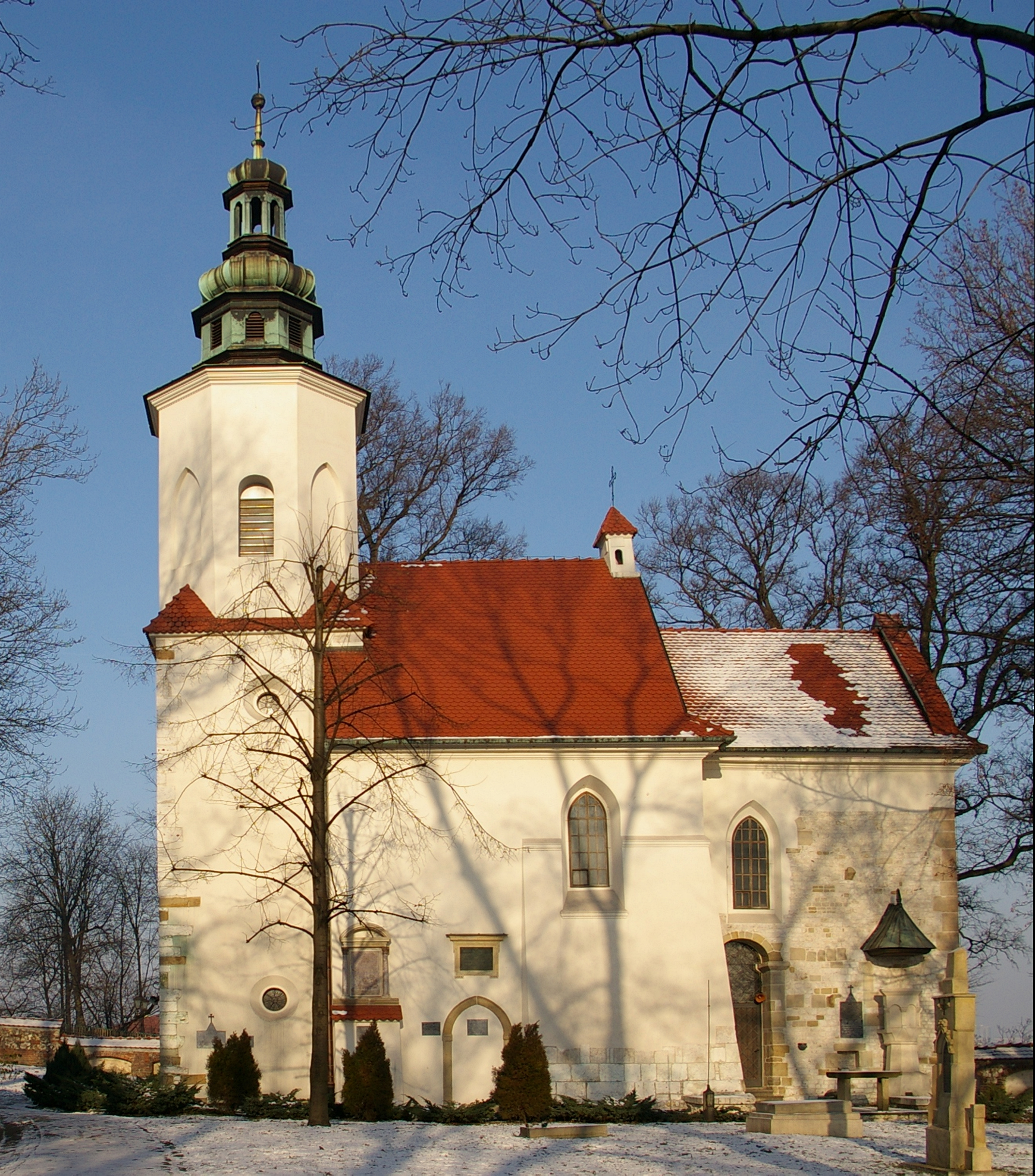
Church of the Holy Saviour

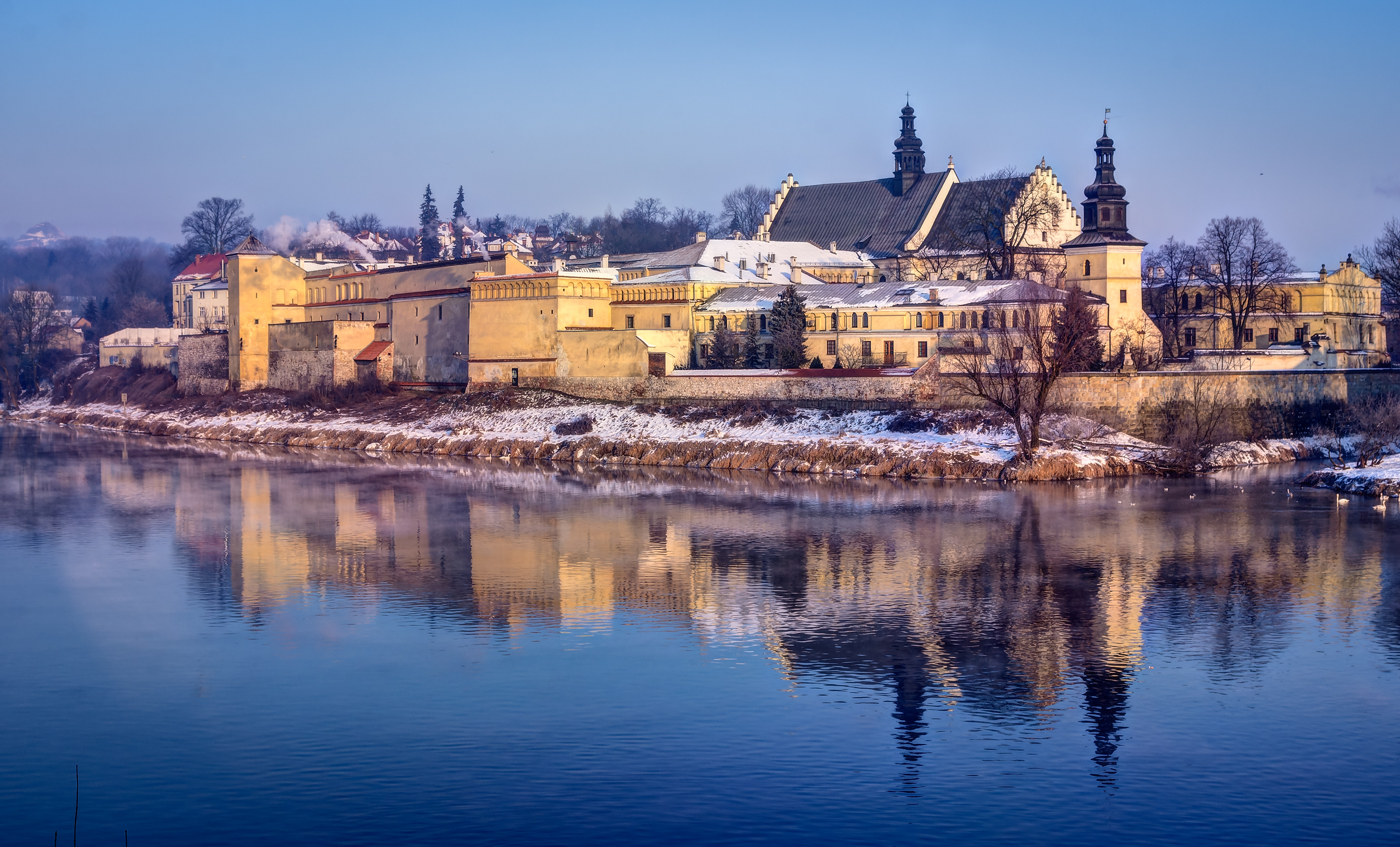
Norbertine monastery

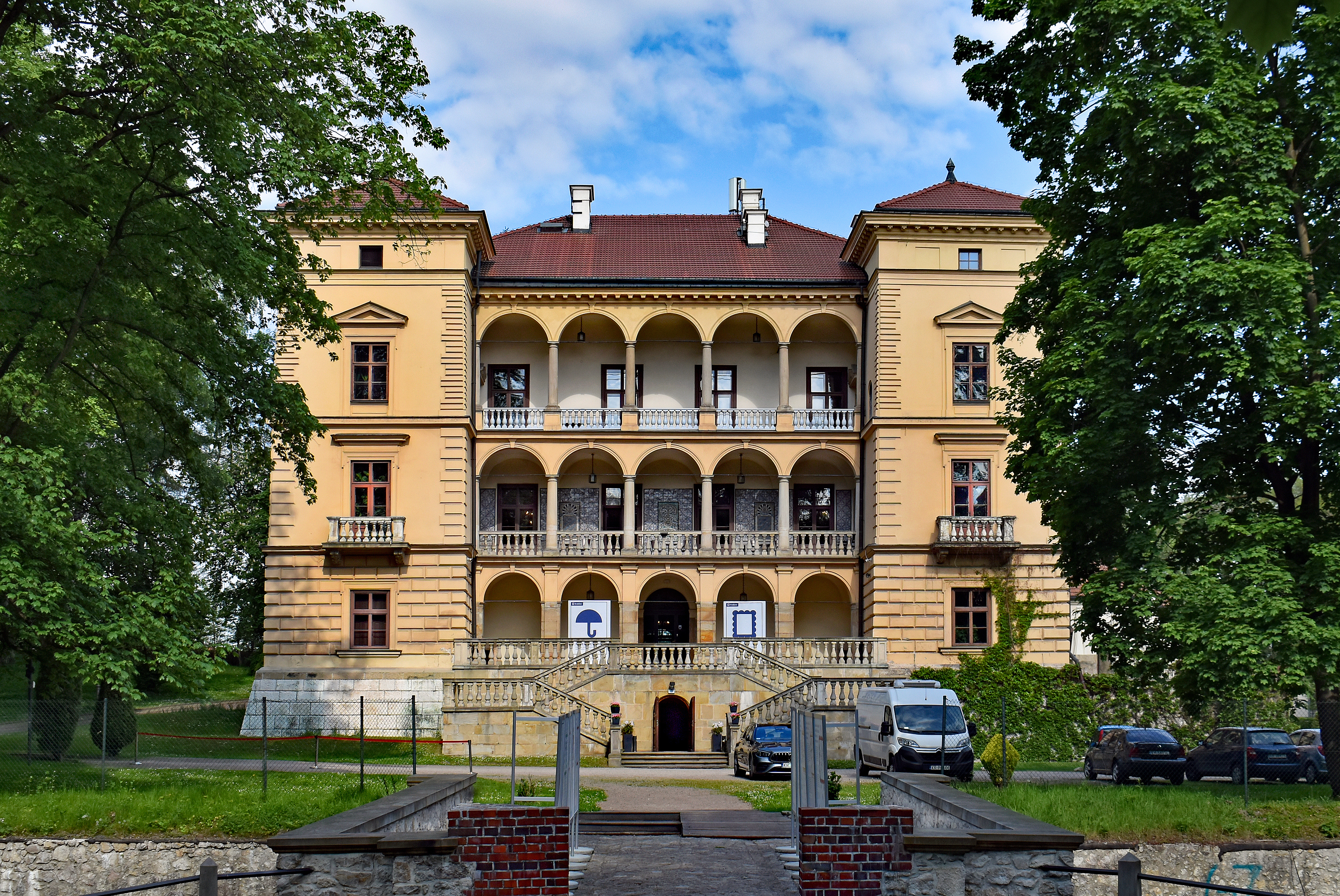
Villa Decius

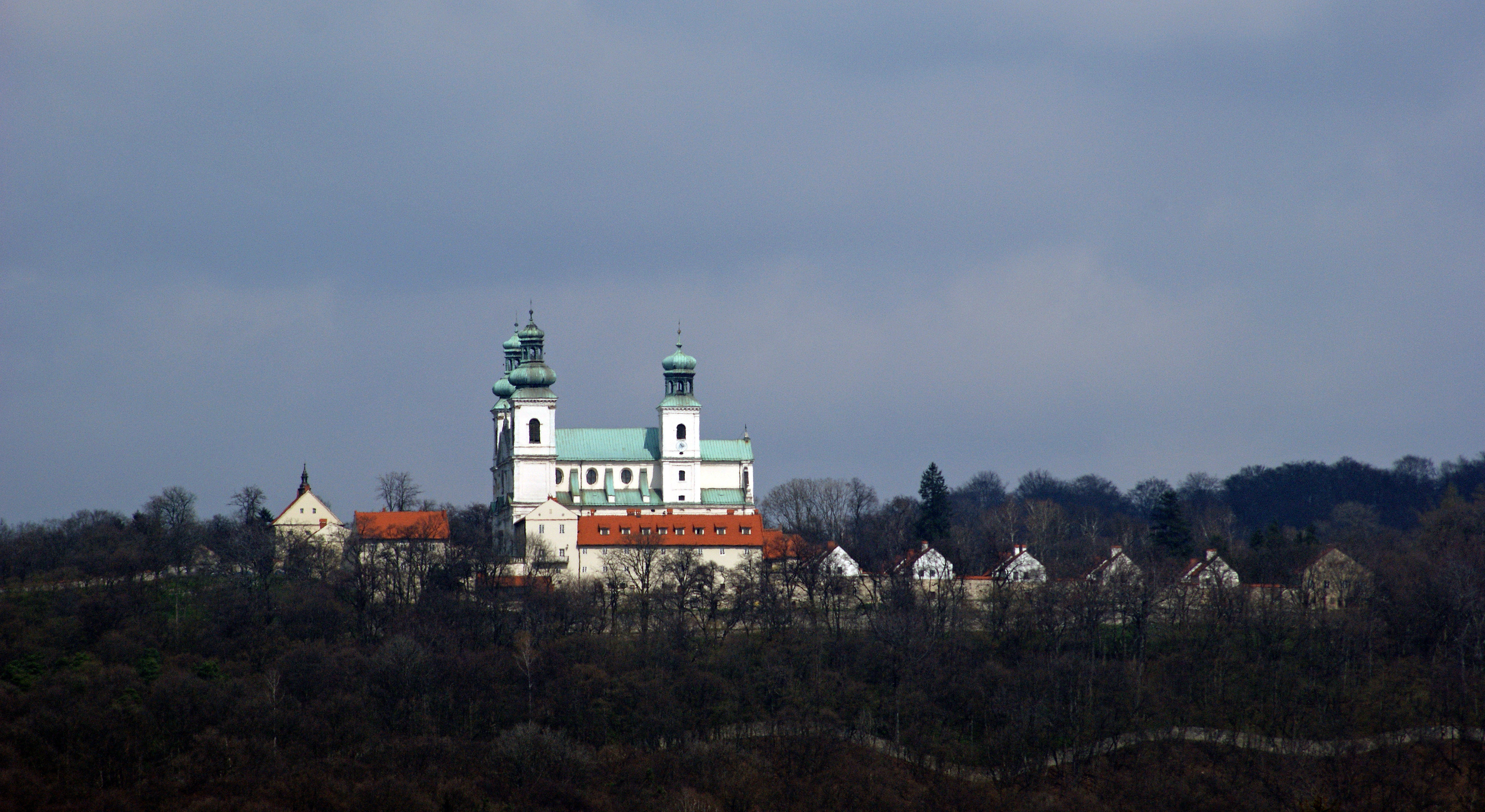
Camaldolese Hermit Monastery

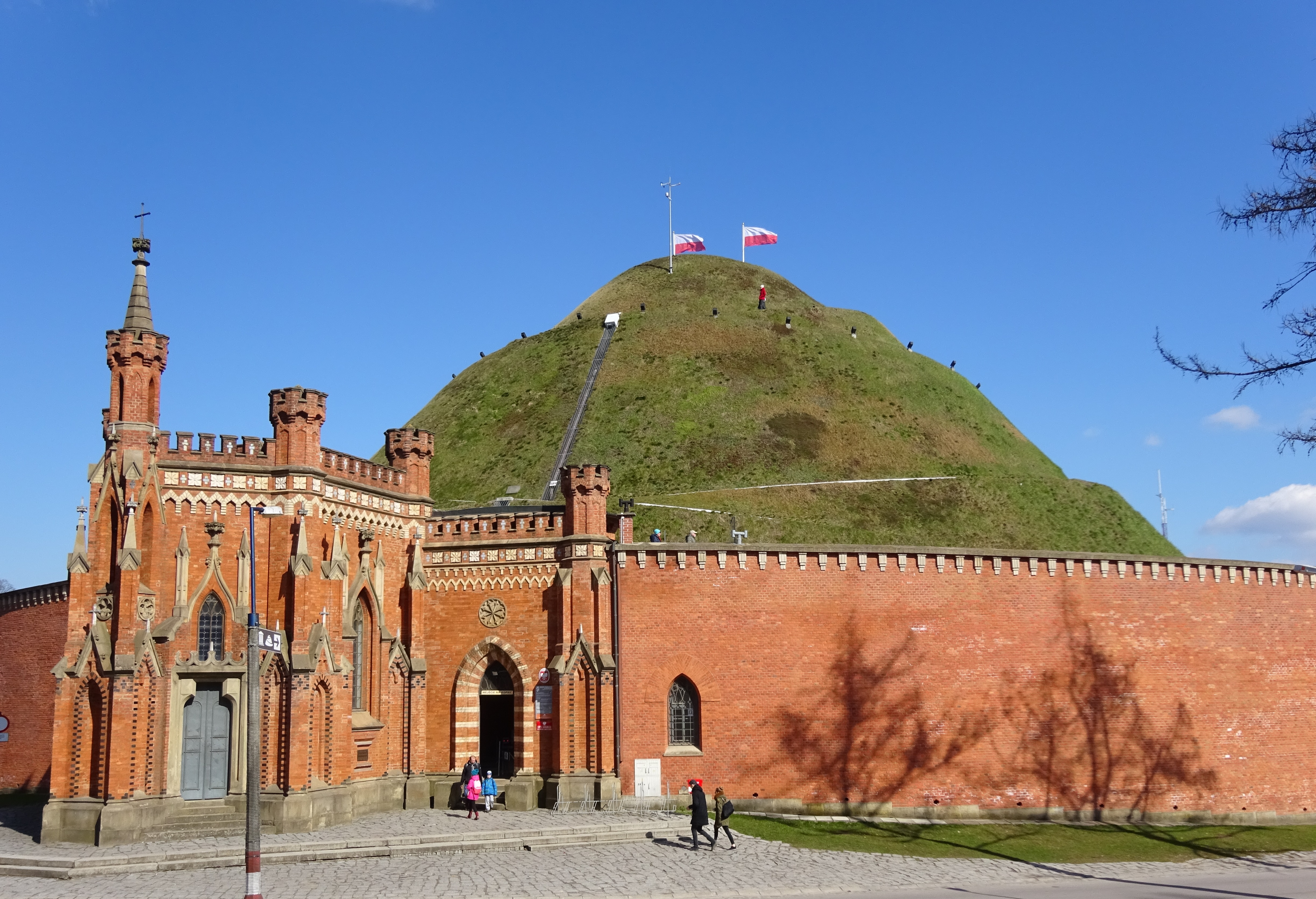
Kościuszko Mound with the Fort "Kościuszko"

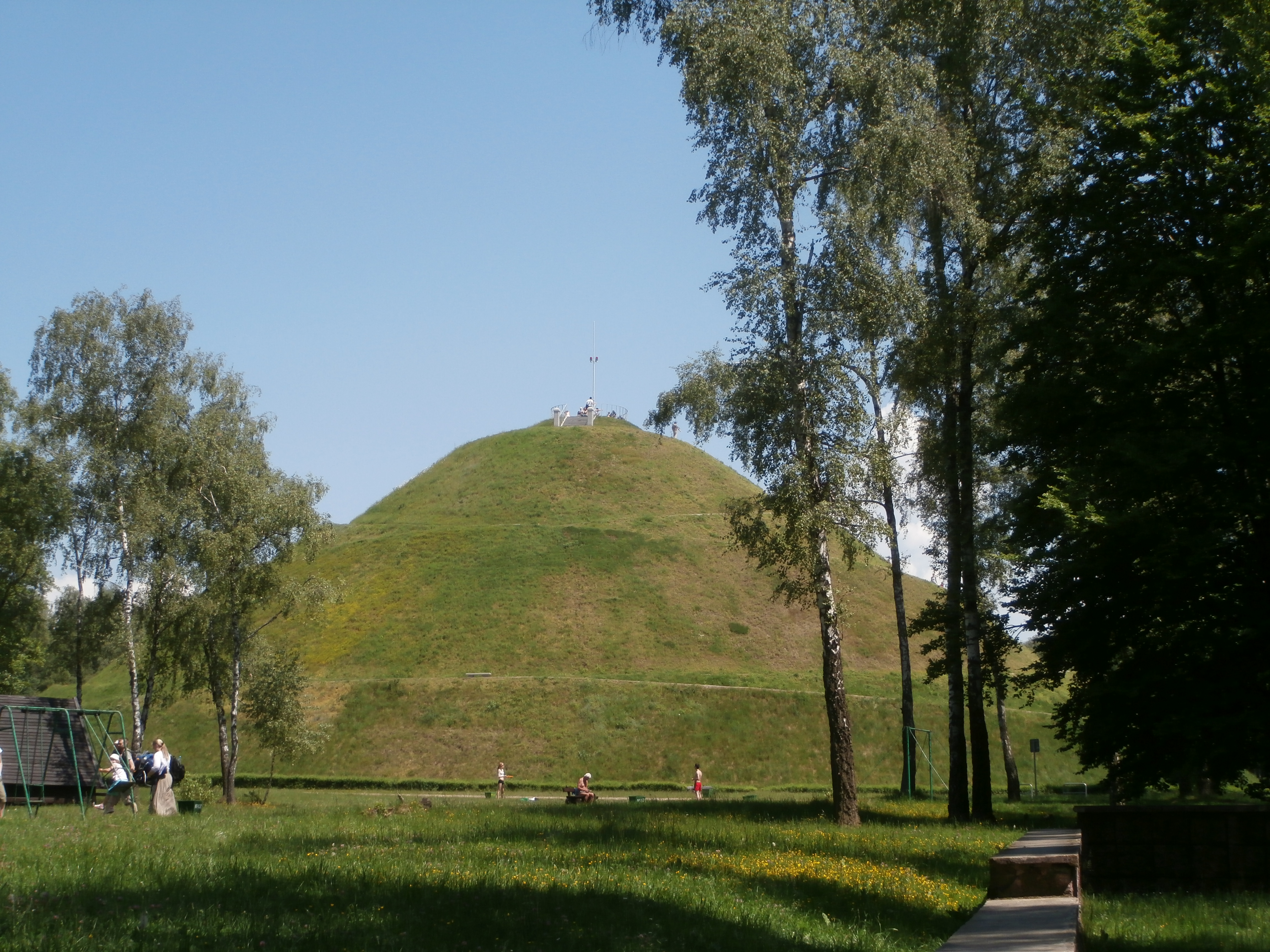
Piłsudski's Mound

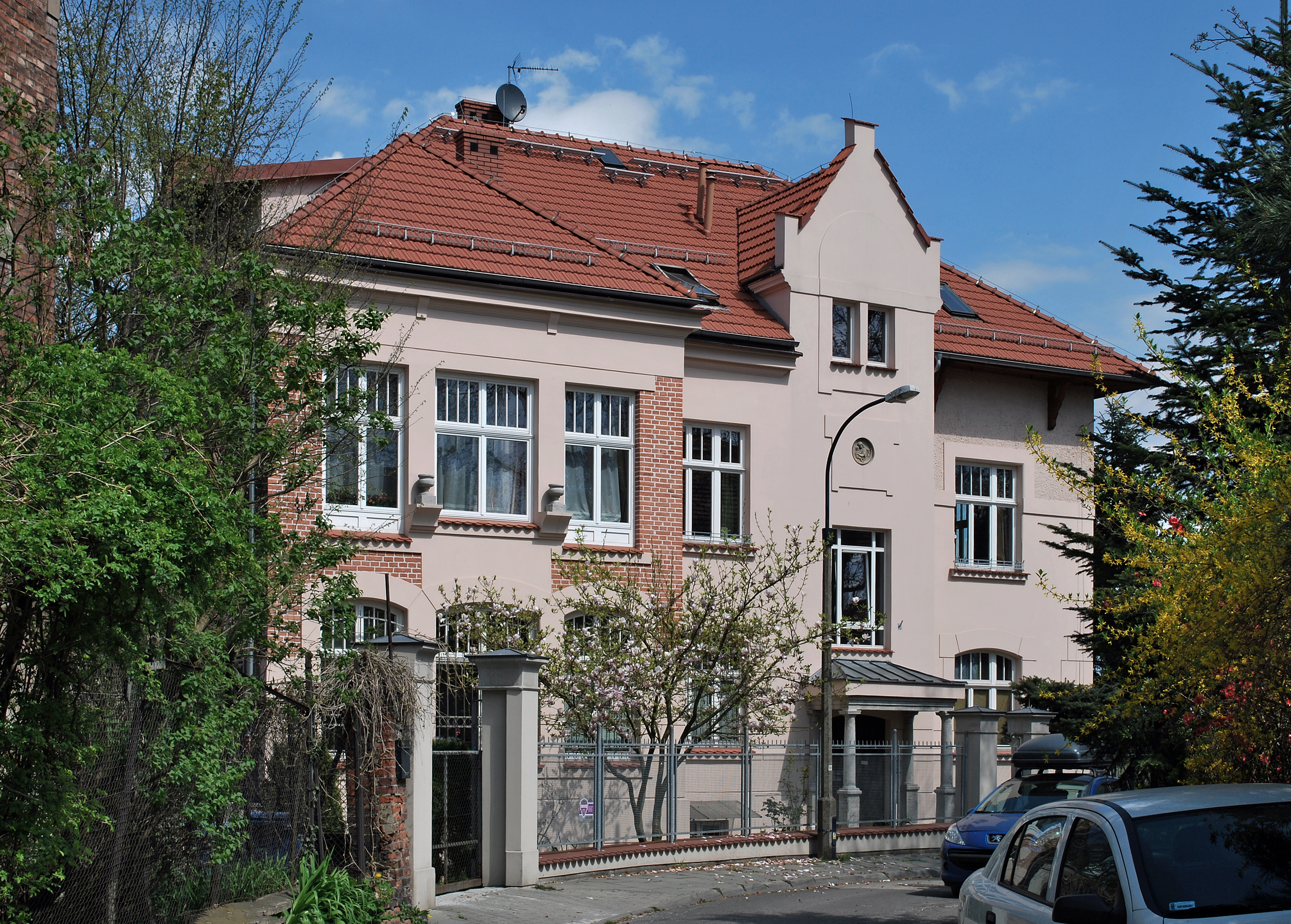
Salwator residential estate

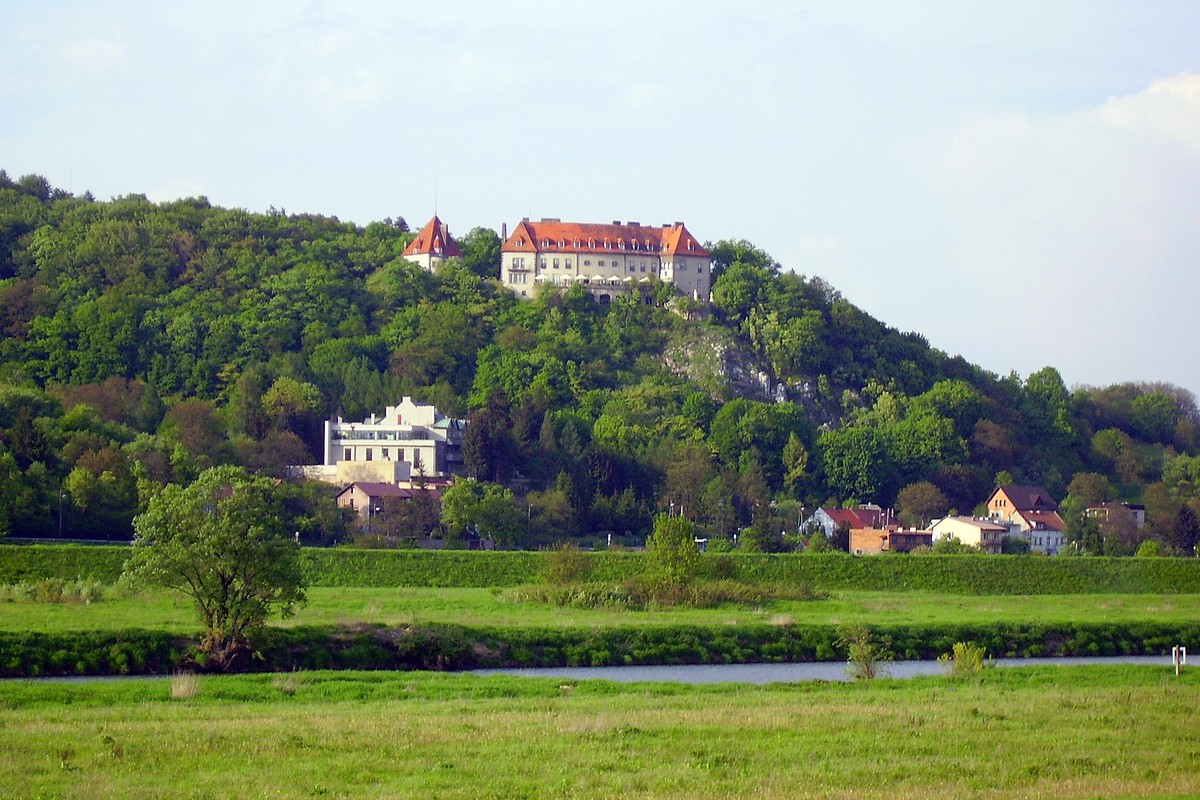
Przegorzały Castle

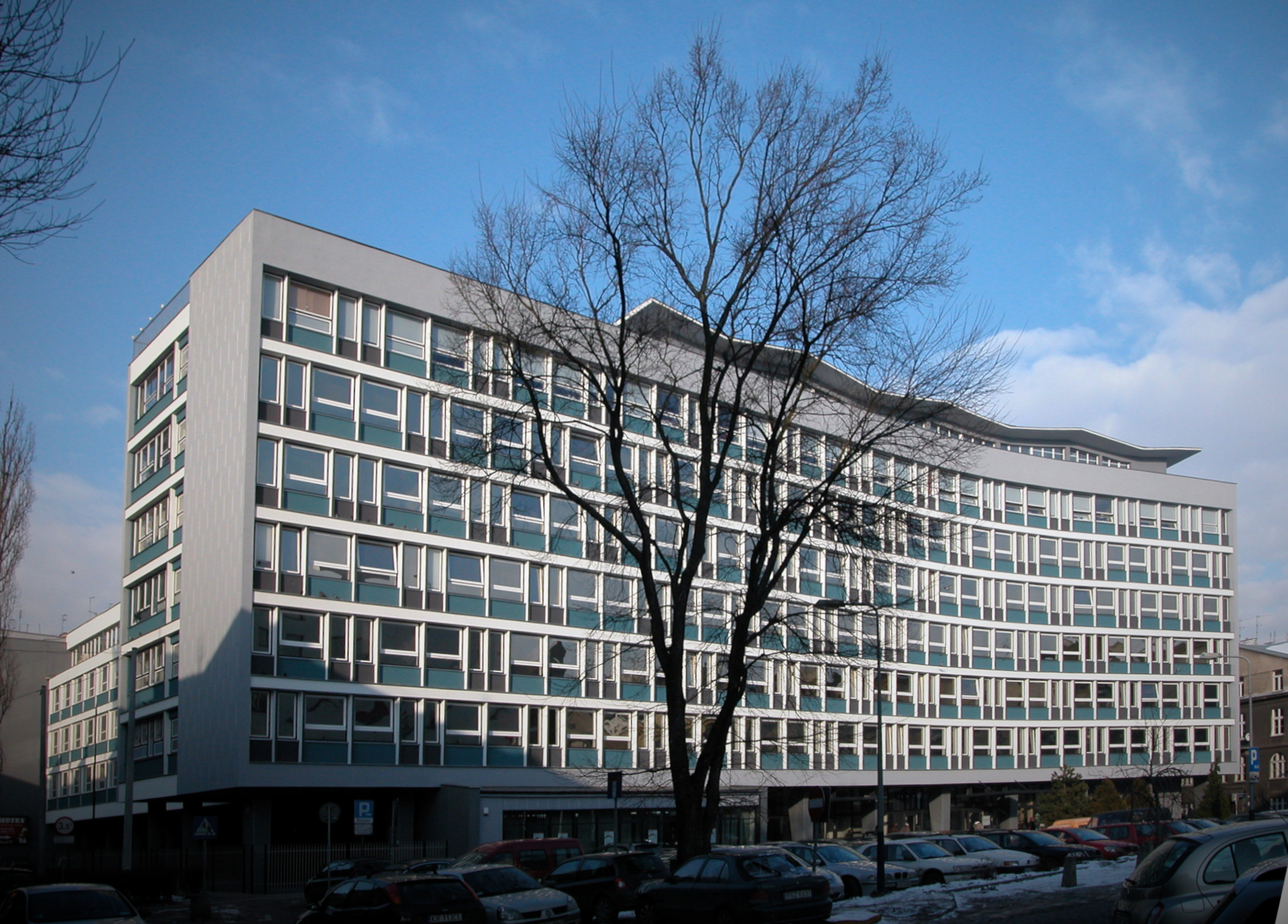
Biprocemwap

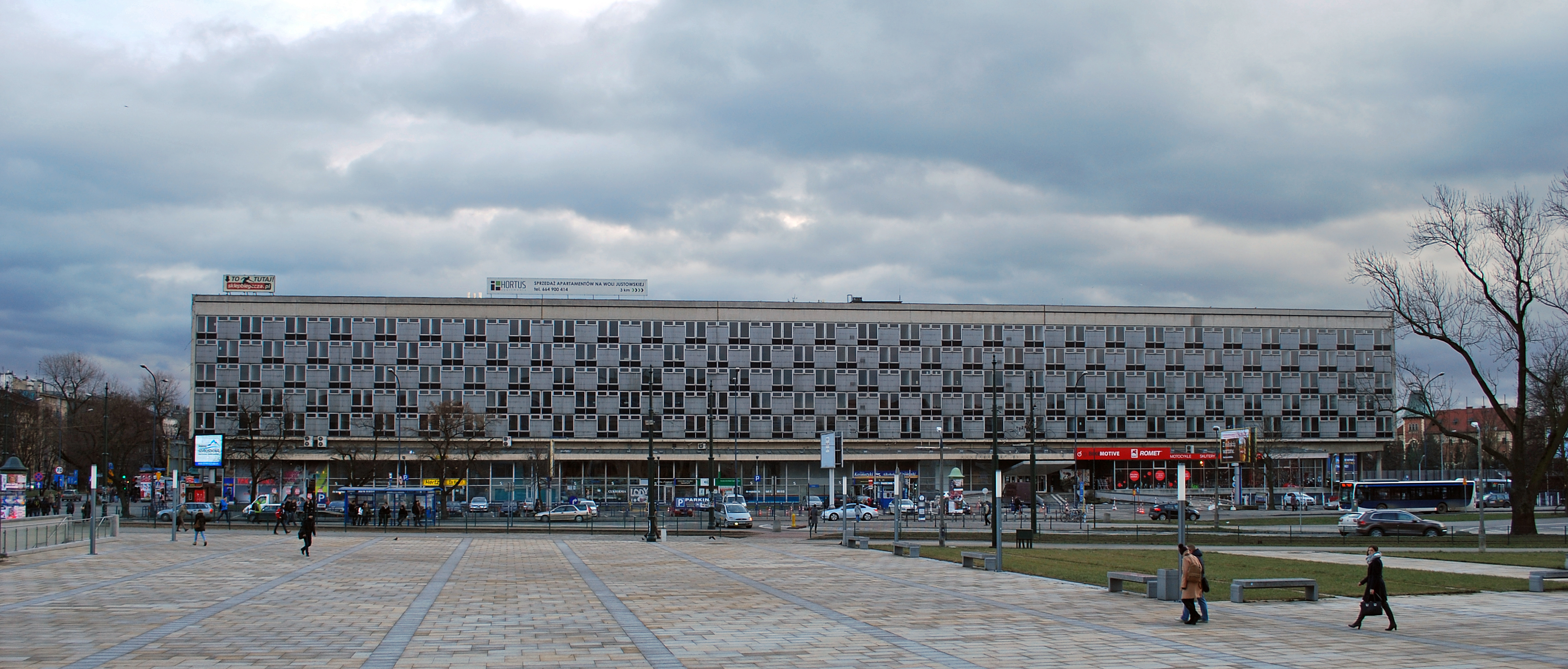
Hotel ‘Cracovia’

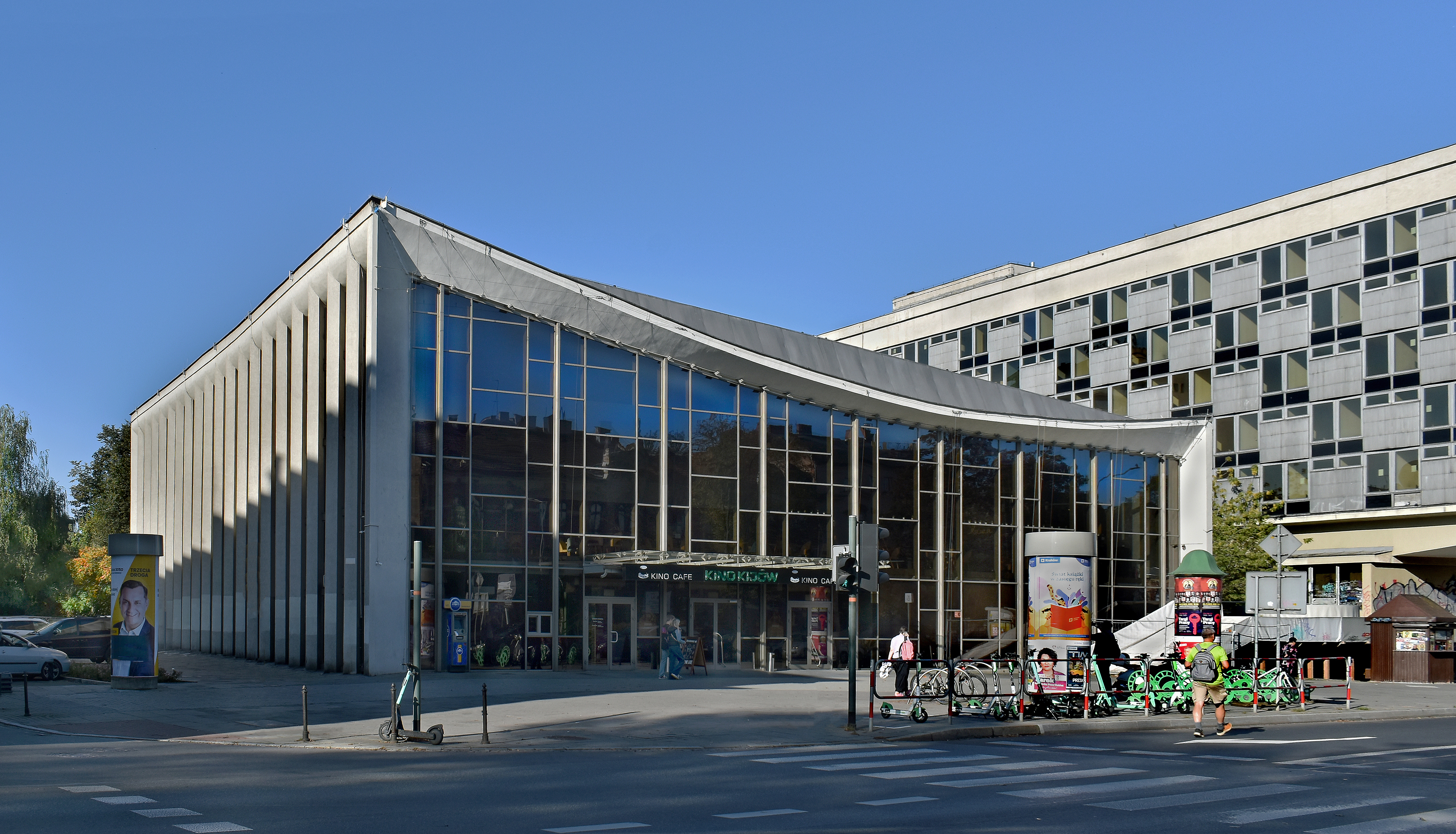
Kijów Cinema

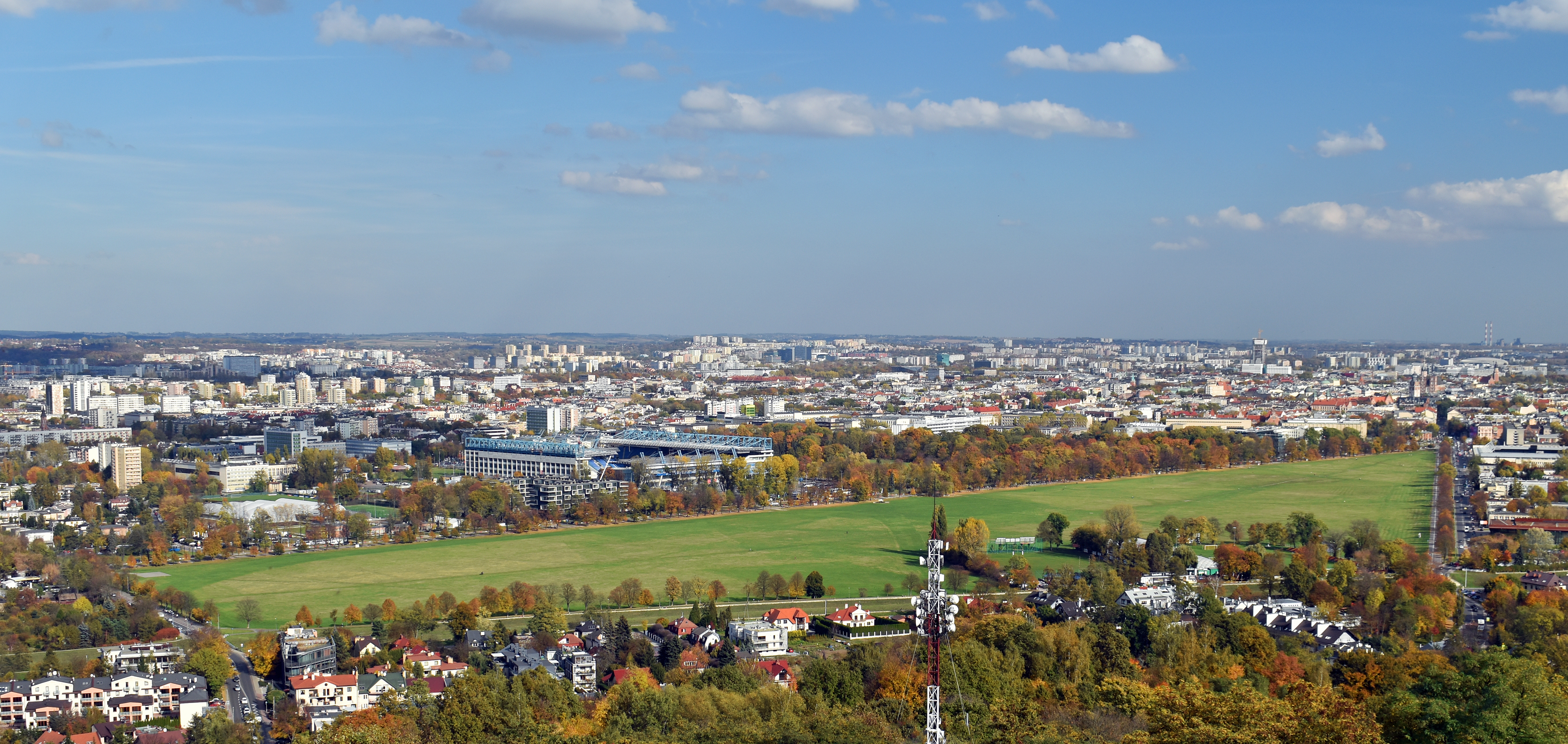
Błonia
