= Błonia =

Urban park in Krakow, Poland

- Błonia
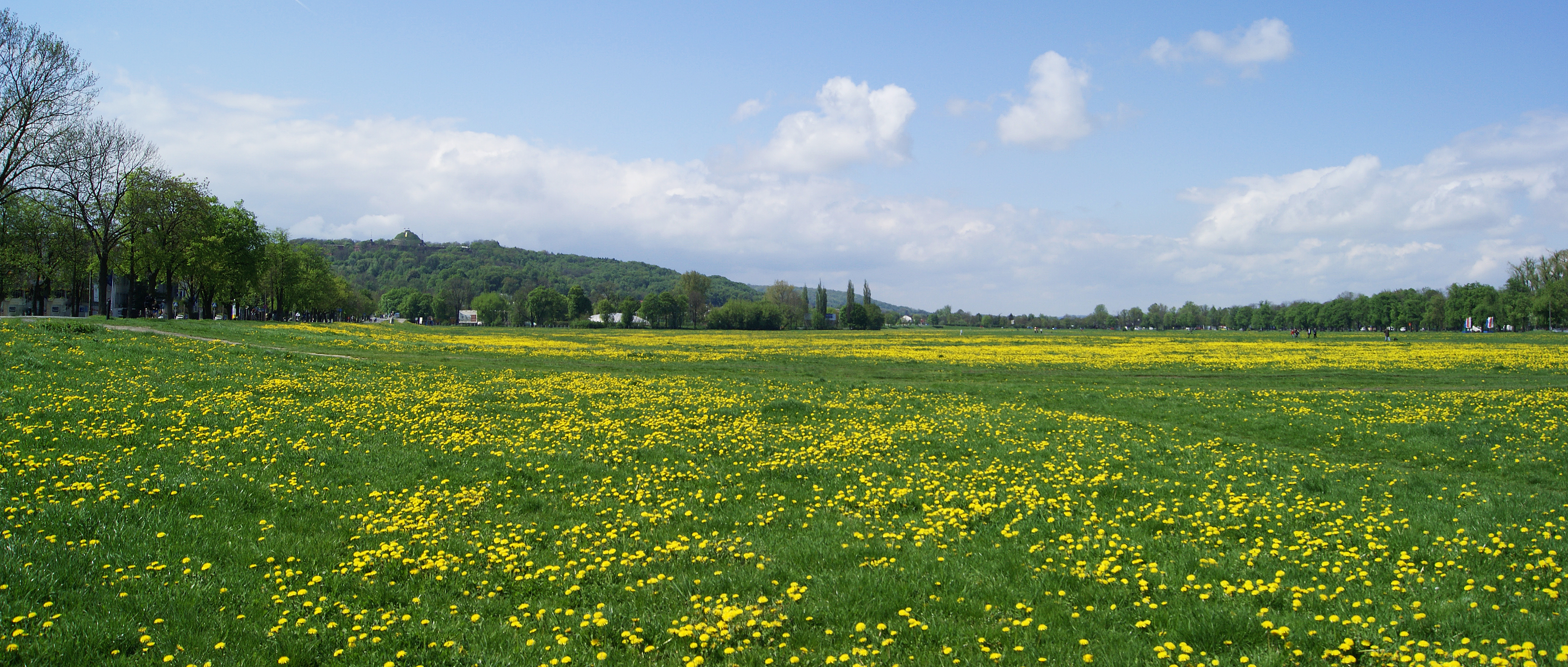
- Park and Kościuszko Mound, view from E.
- Interactive map of Błonia
- Type: Urban park
- Location: Kraków, Poland
- Coordinates: 50°03′35″N 19°54′40″E
- Area: 48 hectares (120 acres)

Błonia Park is a historic city park, meadow with an area of 48 hectares, located in the former quarter Półwsie Zwierzynieckie, of 700 meters west of the Old Town of Kraków, Poland.

The history of the park began in 1162, when a wealthy nobleman Jaksa z Miechowa donated the land between Zwierzyniec and Łobzów to Norbertine Nuns. His intention was to receive a blessing prior to his pilgrimage to the Holy Land. For the next two centuries the meadow belonged to nuns, who in 1366 exchanged it with the city's authorities for a manor at Floriańska Street. The meadow was used by peasants from neighboring villages to graze their cattle.

Until the 19th century Błonia Park was largely neglected, and often flooded by the Rudawa river in the spring turning it into wetland with small islands, probably contributing to the spread of epidemics. After draining the swamps, Błonia became perfectly suitable to host large gatherings. In 1809, when the city was incorporated into the Duchy of Warsaw, Błonia was a place of salute of the troops of Napoleon, organized by Prince Jozef Poniatowski and General Jan Henryk Dąbrowski.

Today Błonia is a recreation area, frequently hosting large events like concerts and exhibitions. The place is best known for great Masses celebrated by Pope John Paul II in 1979, 1983, 1987, 1997 and 2002. Pope Benedict XVI also celebrated the Mass there during his journey to Poland in May 2006. The opening Mass of the 2016 World Youth Day was held at Błonia Park in July 2016, however the main events, including the Mass celebrated by Pope Francis, were held outside the city.

Błonia Park is also used to host popular culture events, such as concerts organized by a local radio station or the Iuvenalia student festival. Pop star Celine Dion's Taking Chances World Tour concert on June 28, 2008 performed to nearly 55,000 people The vast meadow was also used for politicized promotion of the Małopolska region farming industry by PSL in 2011 with a herd of 150 sheep trucked in from hundreds of kilometres away for one month, and the city permit worth 3,200 złoty. The last cattle grazed at Błonia in the 1970s.

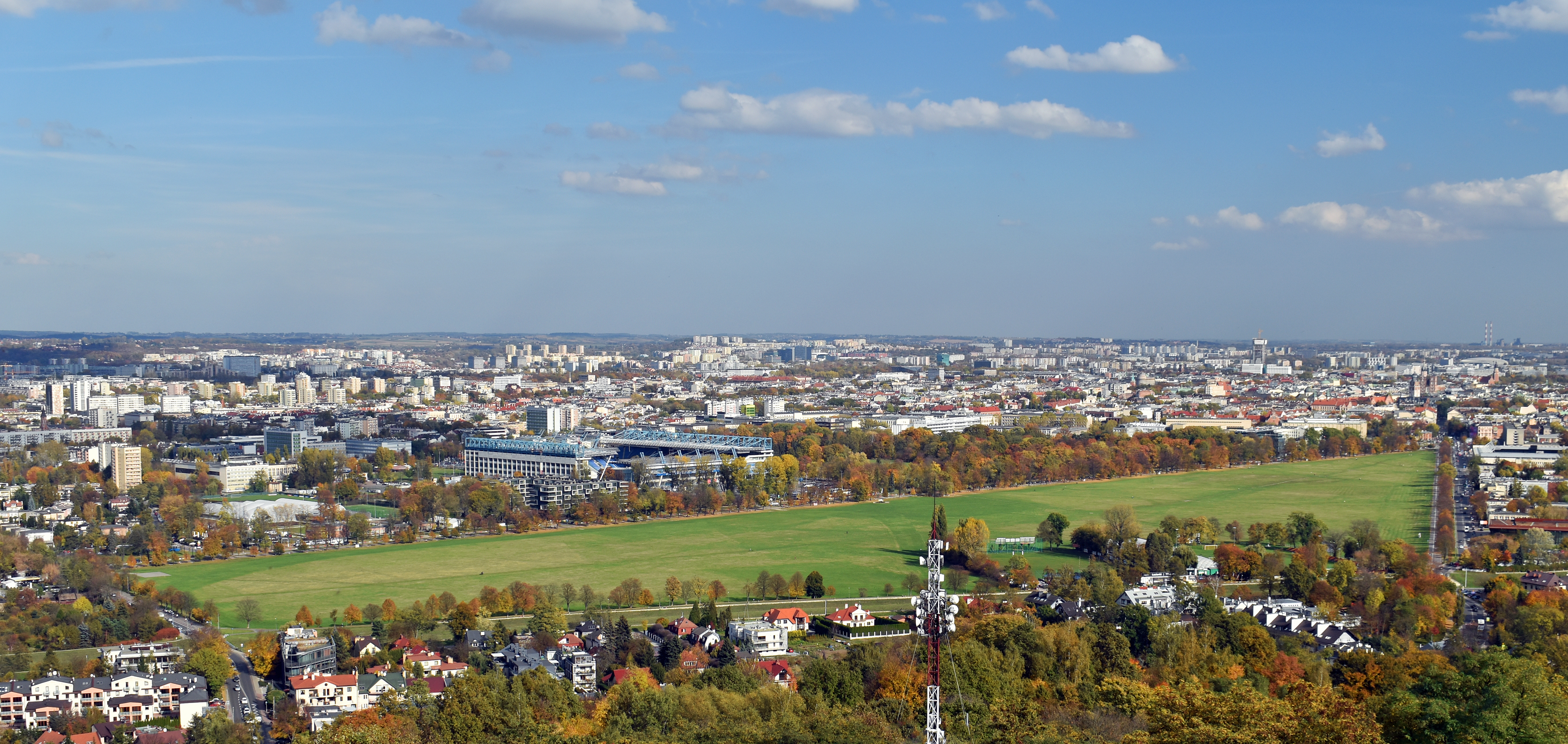
Błonia Park as seen from the Kościuszko Mound

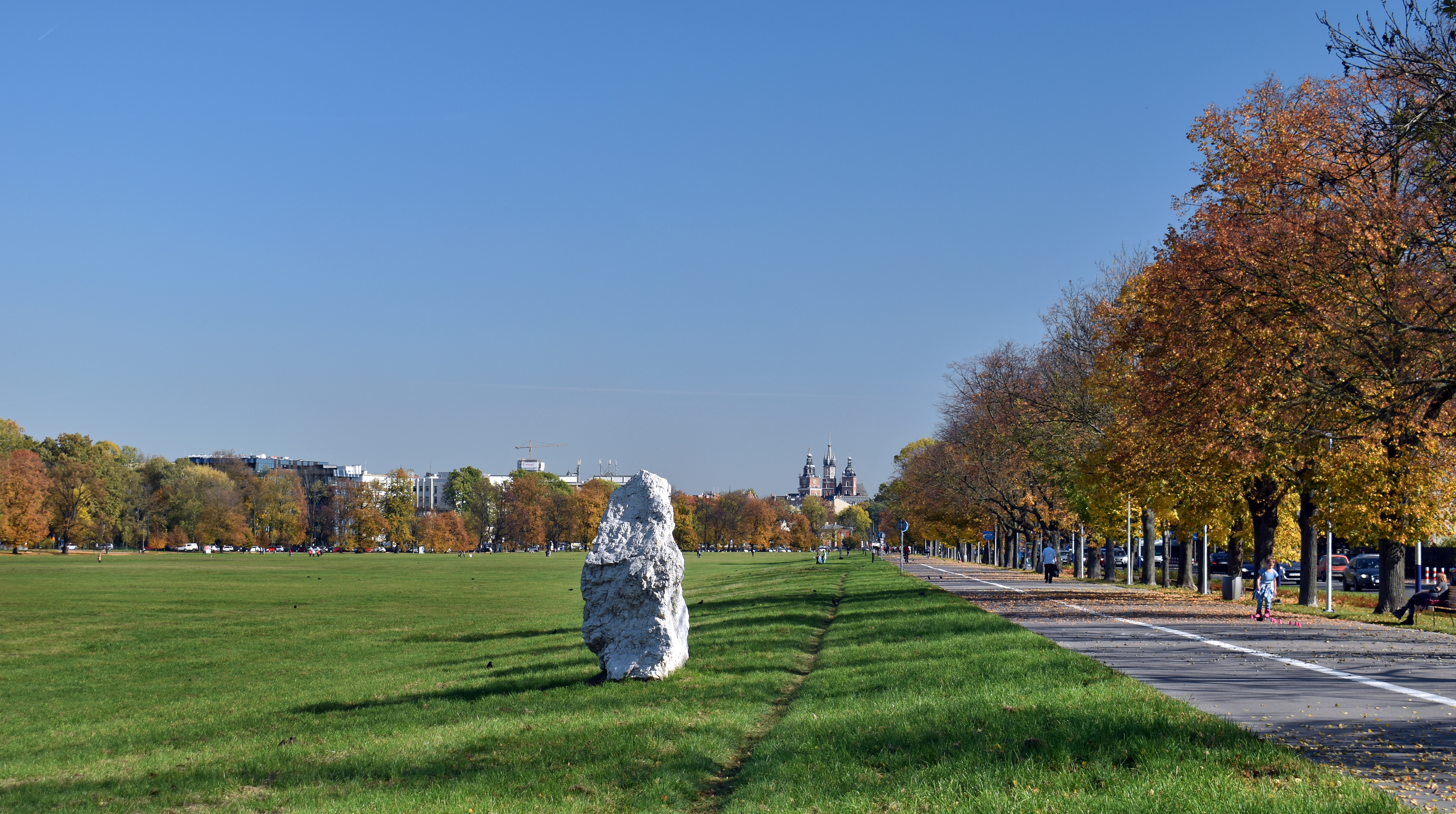
View towards the Old Town (to the east)

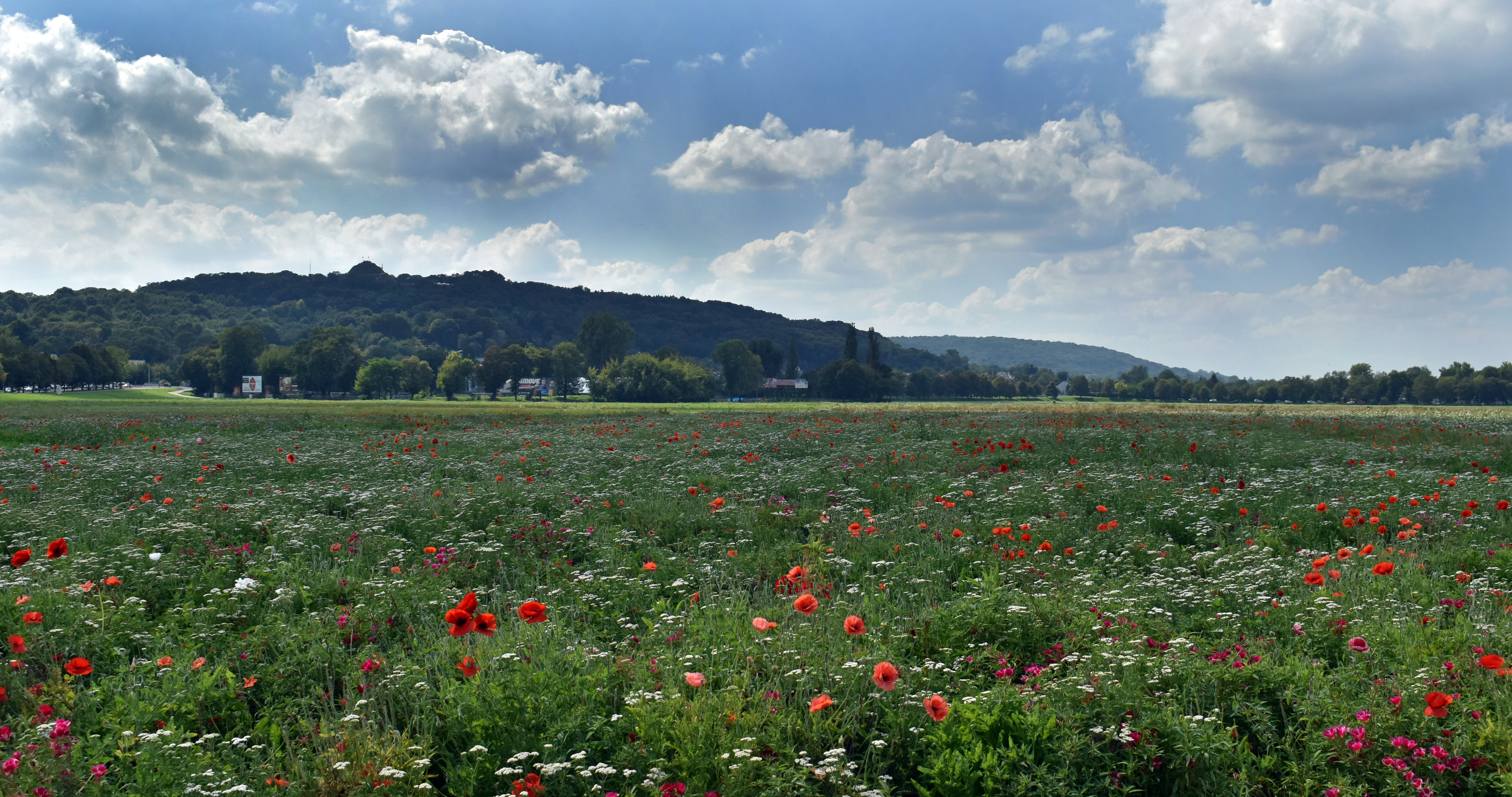
Summer in park

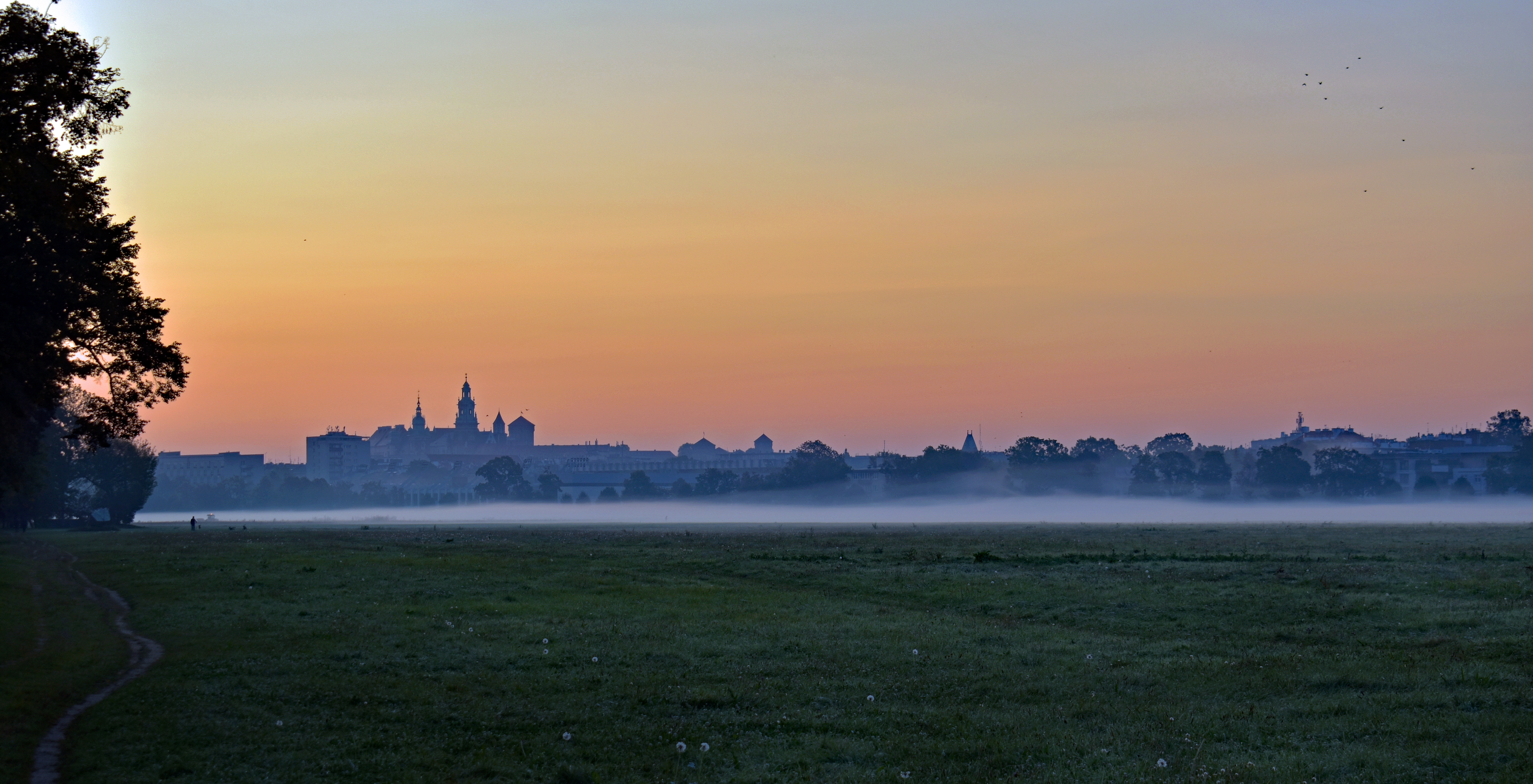
Morning and Wawel Castle seen from the park

== Bibliography ==
- (in Polish) * Praca zbiorowa Encyklopedia Krakowa, wydawca Biblioteka Kraków i Muzeum Krakowa, Kraków 2023, ISBN 978-83-66253-46-9 volume I pp 133-134 (Encyclopedia of Krakow)
