= Zwierzyniec, Kraków =

Former village, former XIII quarter of Kraków, Poland

Zwierzyniec
- Former village Former XIII quarter of Kraków
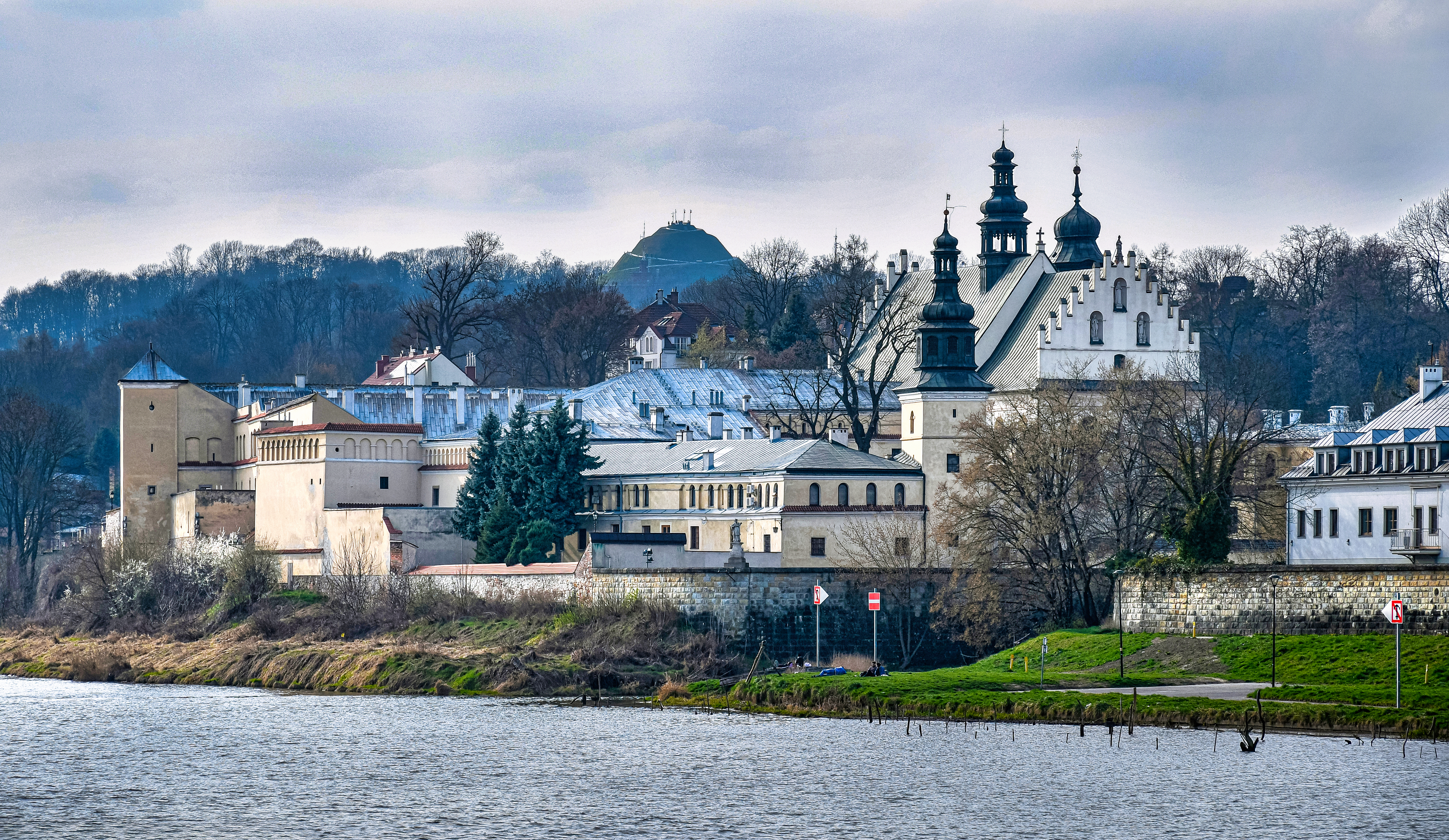
- Church of St. Augustine and St. John the Baptist, Norbertine Sisters monastery and Kościuszko Mound

- Zwierzyniec on the map of the District VII Zwierzyniec
- Coordinates: 50°03′14″N 19°53′44″E
- City: Kraków

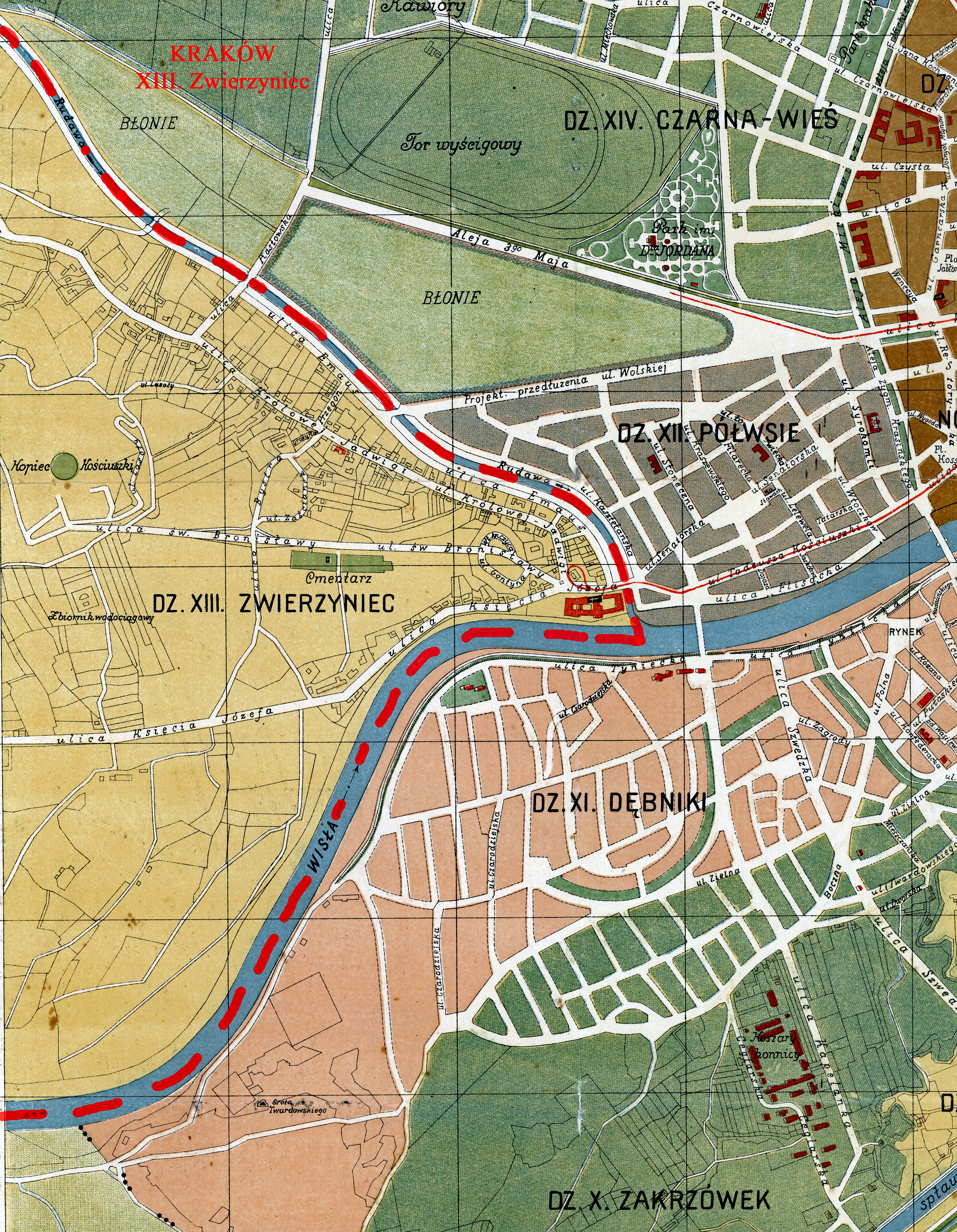
Zwierzyniec to 1954 quarter of Kraków

Zwierzyniec former village, incorporated on 13 November 1909 as the XIII quarter of Kraków, Poland. It is now part of the District VII Zwierzyniec.

== History ==
The oldest preserved buildings in Zwierzyniec are the Church of the Holy Salvatore consecrated in 1148 and the Norbertine convent, probably consecrated in 1181. The history of Zwierzyniec is closely connected with the convent. In the 13th century, three Tartar invasions are documented, in 1241, 1259 and 1287, which plundered Zwierzyniec and burnt down the monastery. The monastery and Zwierzyniec were burnt down again in 1527 and in 1587, during the siege of Krakow by the army of Archduke Maximilian Habsburg, who wanted to occupy Krakow against his rival, Sigismund III Vasa. The latter's supporter, Jan Zamoyski, in order to prevent the Austrians from gaining a foothold in the suburbs, ordered the entire Zwierzyniec and Półwsie, among others, to be burnt down. The present appearance of the monastery dates from the time of its great reconstruction carried out in 1596-1626, when the convent was ruled by the princess Dorota Kątska. Zwierzyniec was incorporated into Krakow in 1910 and has since been transformed into a villa district.

== Landmarks ==
- Church of the Holy Saviour - built in the XII century in the Romanesque style and rebuilt ca. 1600 in the Post-Gothic style
- Church of St. Augustine and St. John the Baptist and Norbertine monastery - built in the XII century in the Romanesque style and rebuilt 1596–1626 in the Post-Gothic style
- Church of St. Margaret and St. Judith
- Kościuszko Mound - artificial mound built 1820-1823 in honor of Tadeusz Kościuszko; between 1850 and 1854 Fort "Kosciuszko" was built around it, part of the Kraków Fortress
- Salwator residential estate - a ‘garden city’ type villa estate along Świętej Bronisławy Street built between 1911 and 1955
- Salwatorski Cemetery

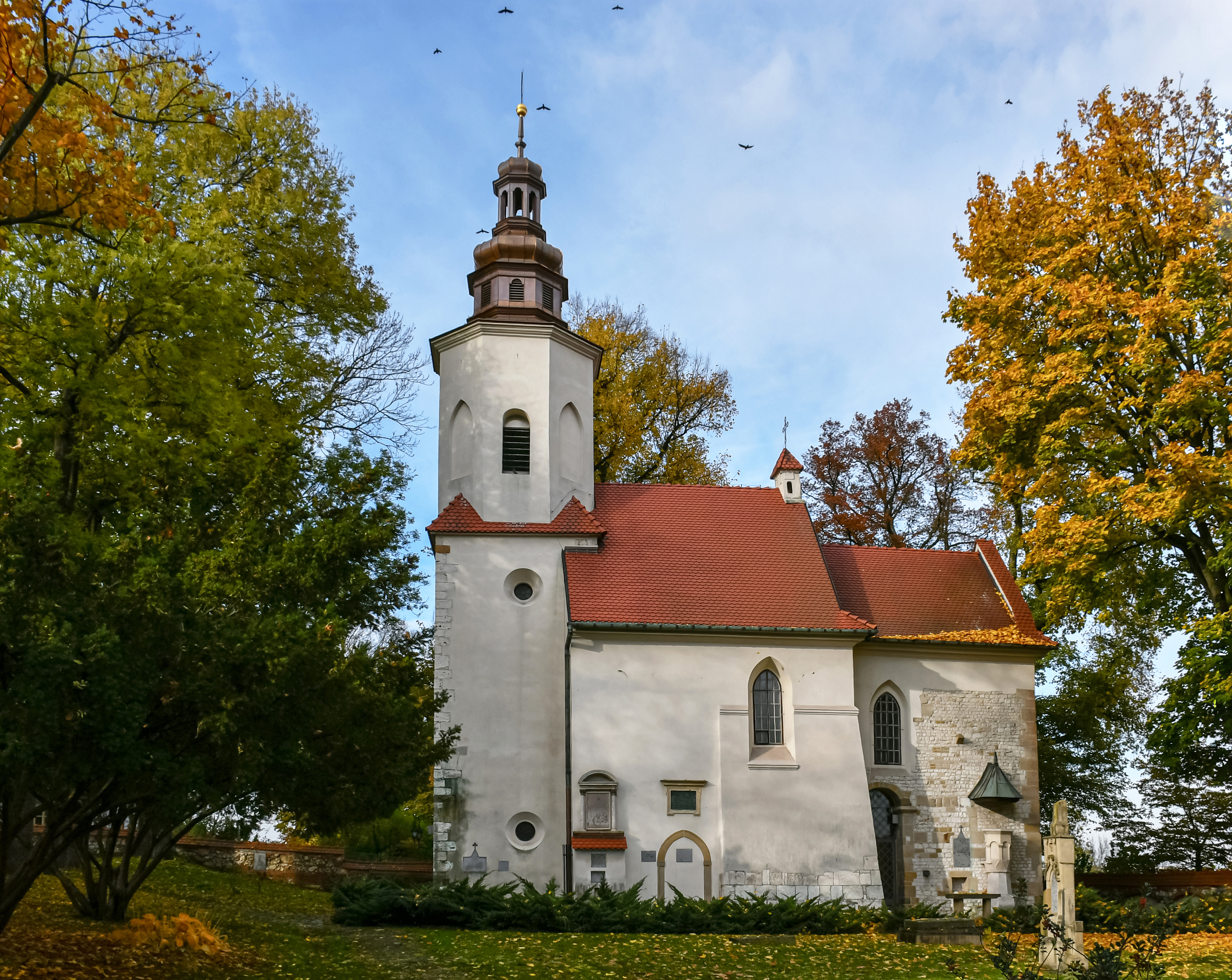
Church of the Holy Saviour

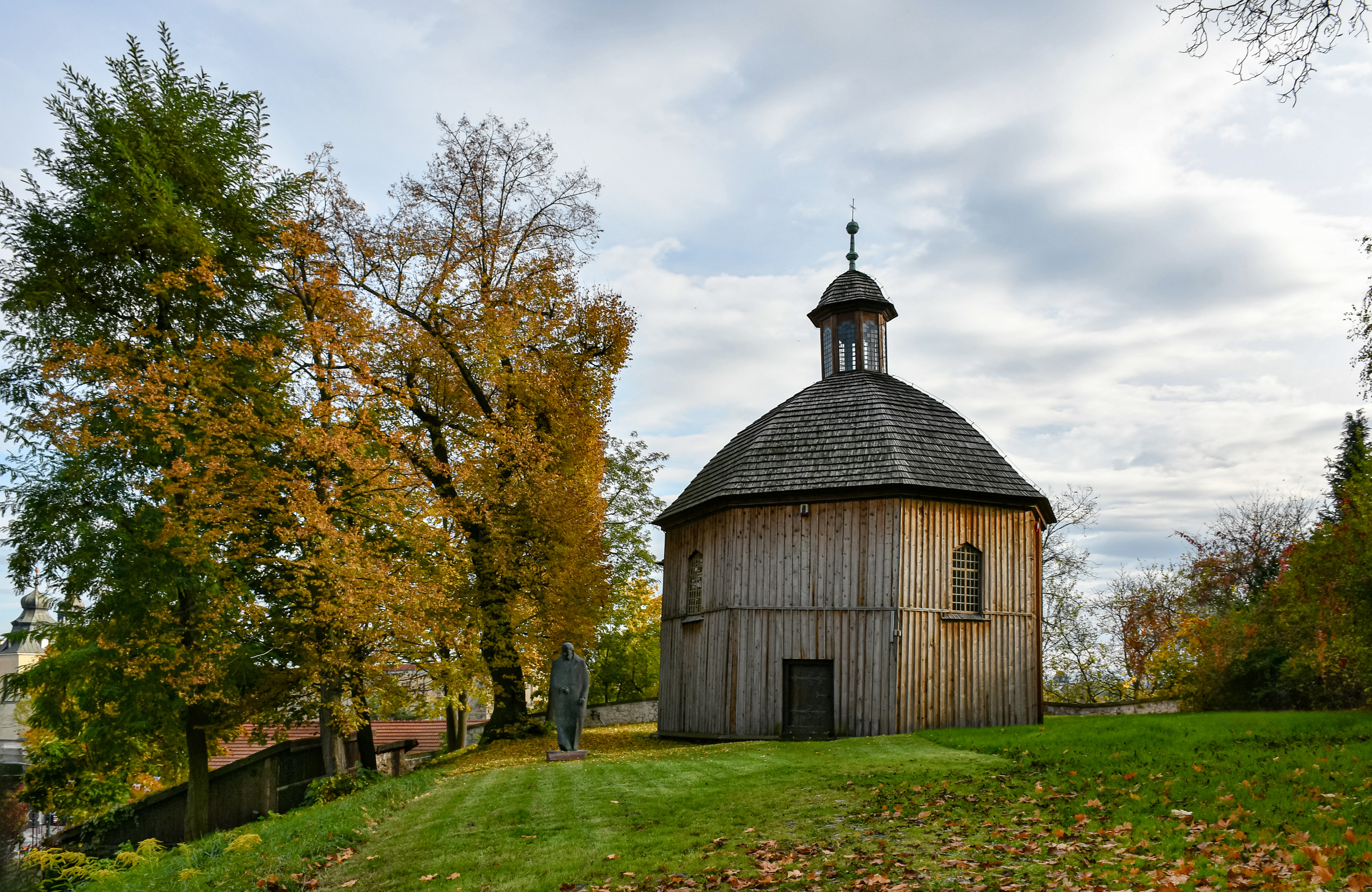
Church of St. Margaret and St. Judith

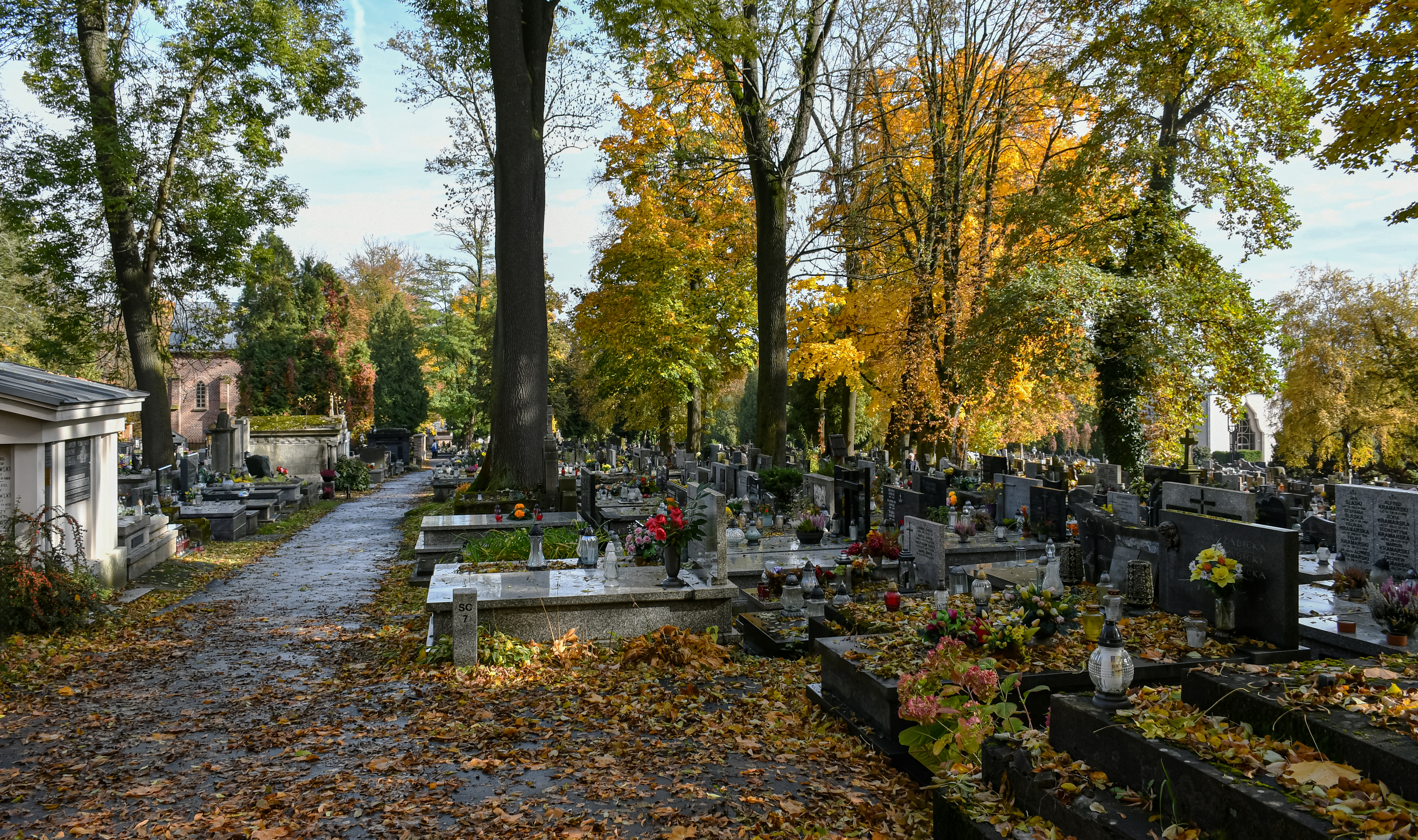
Salwatorski Cemetery

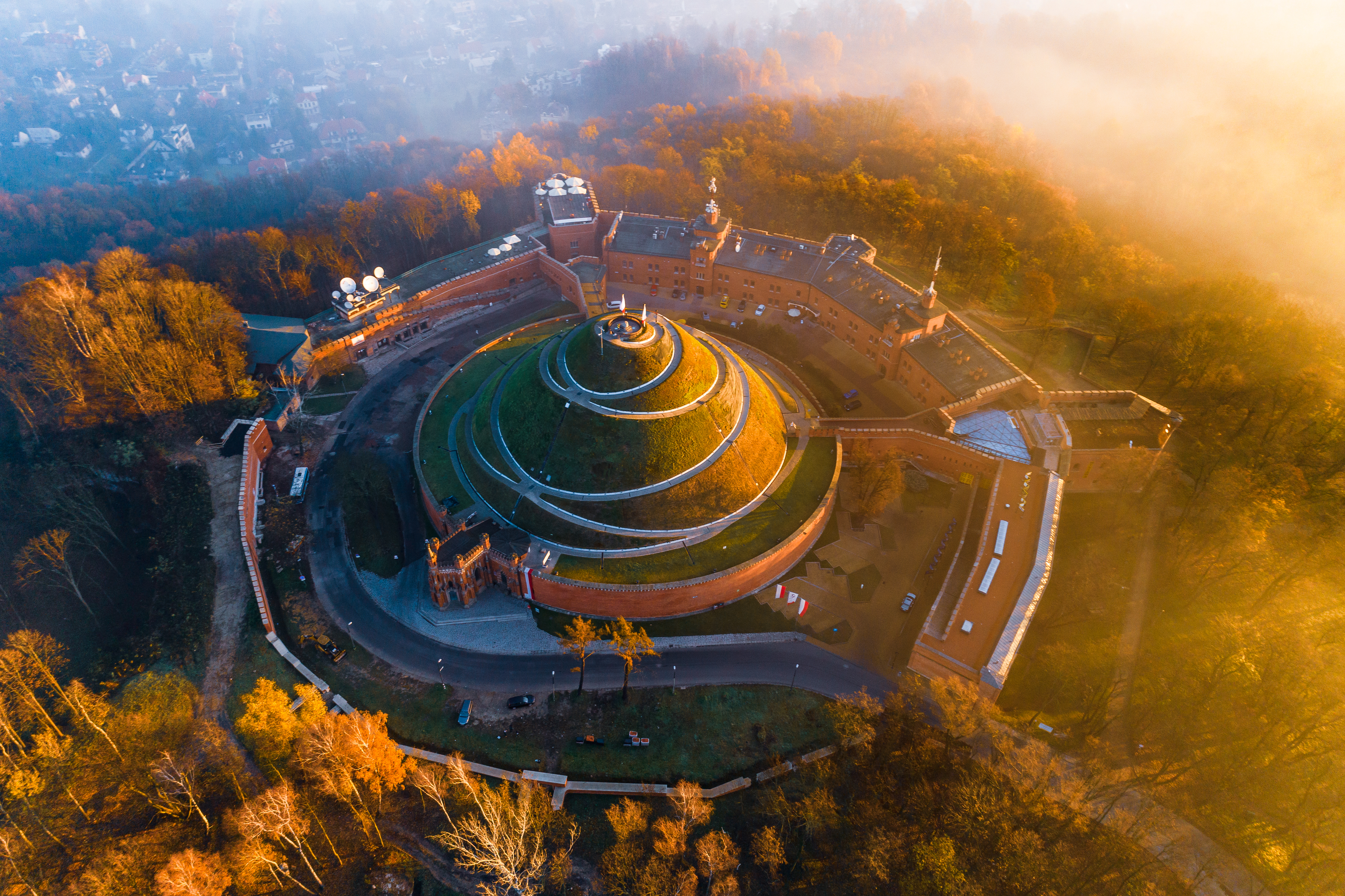
Kościuszko Mound

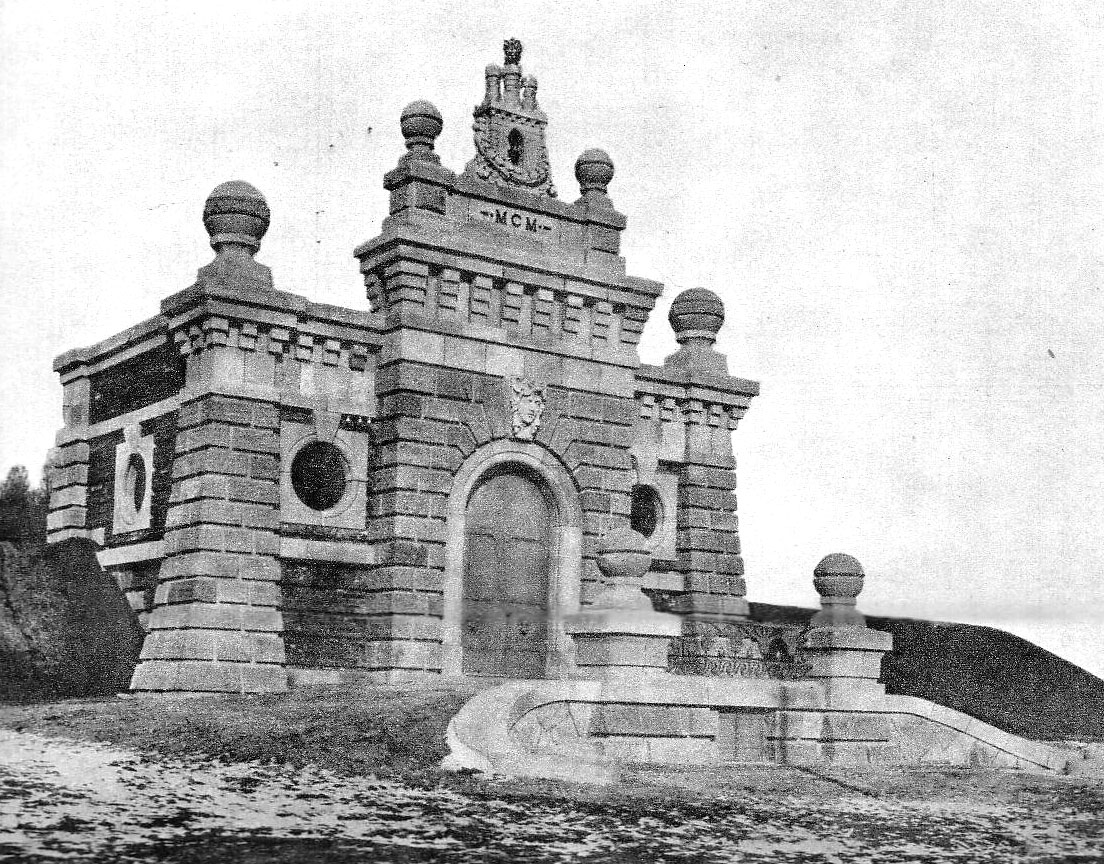
Municipal water supply plant

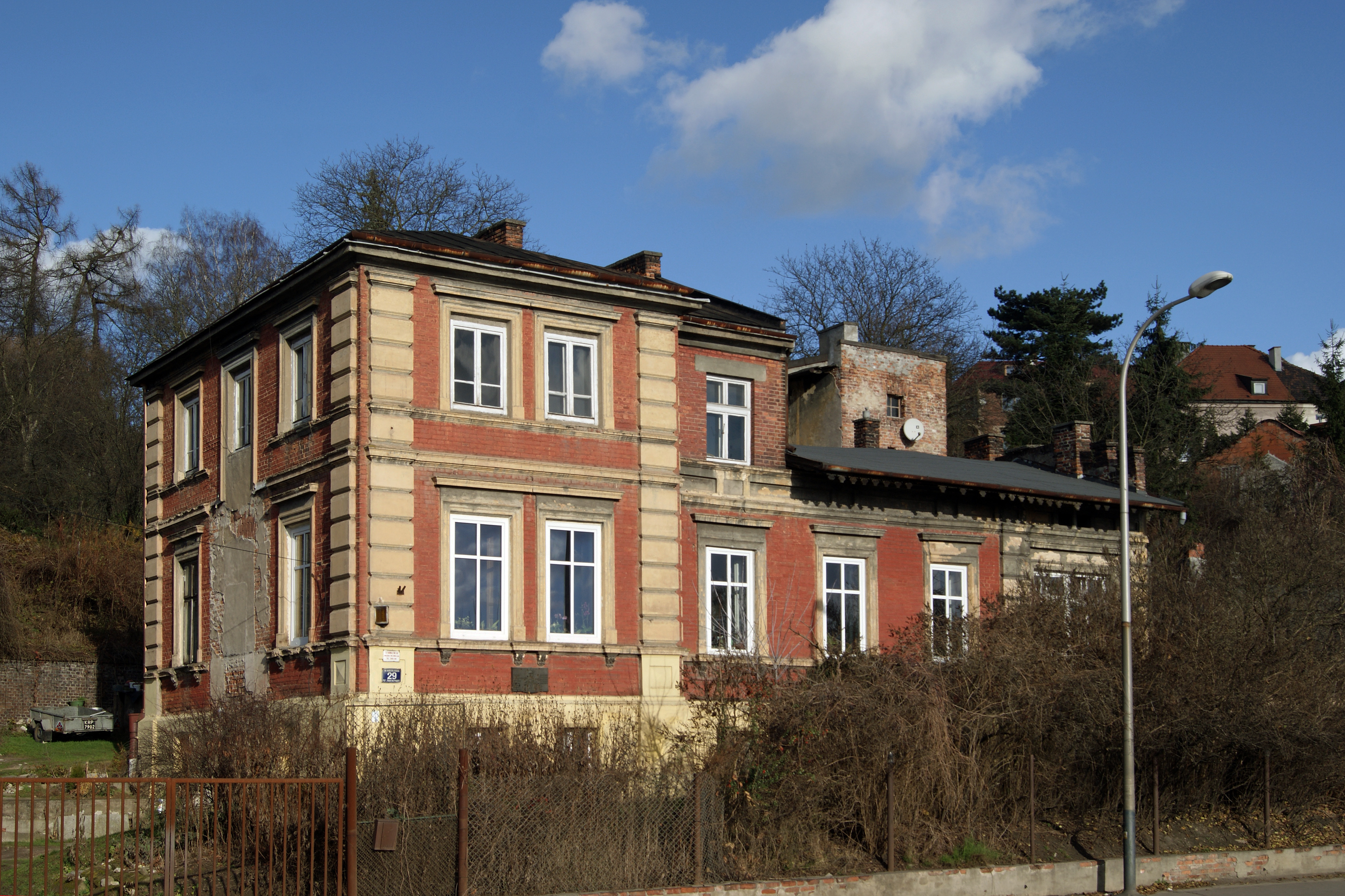
“Under the Virgin Mary” Villa
the painter Jacek Malczewski lived and had his studio here

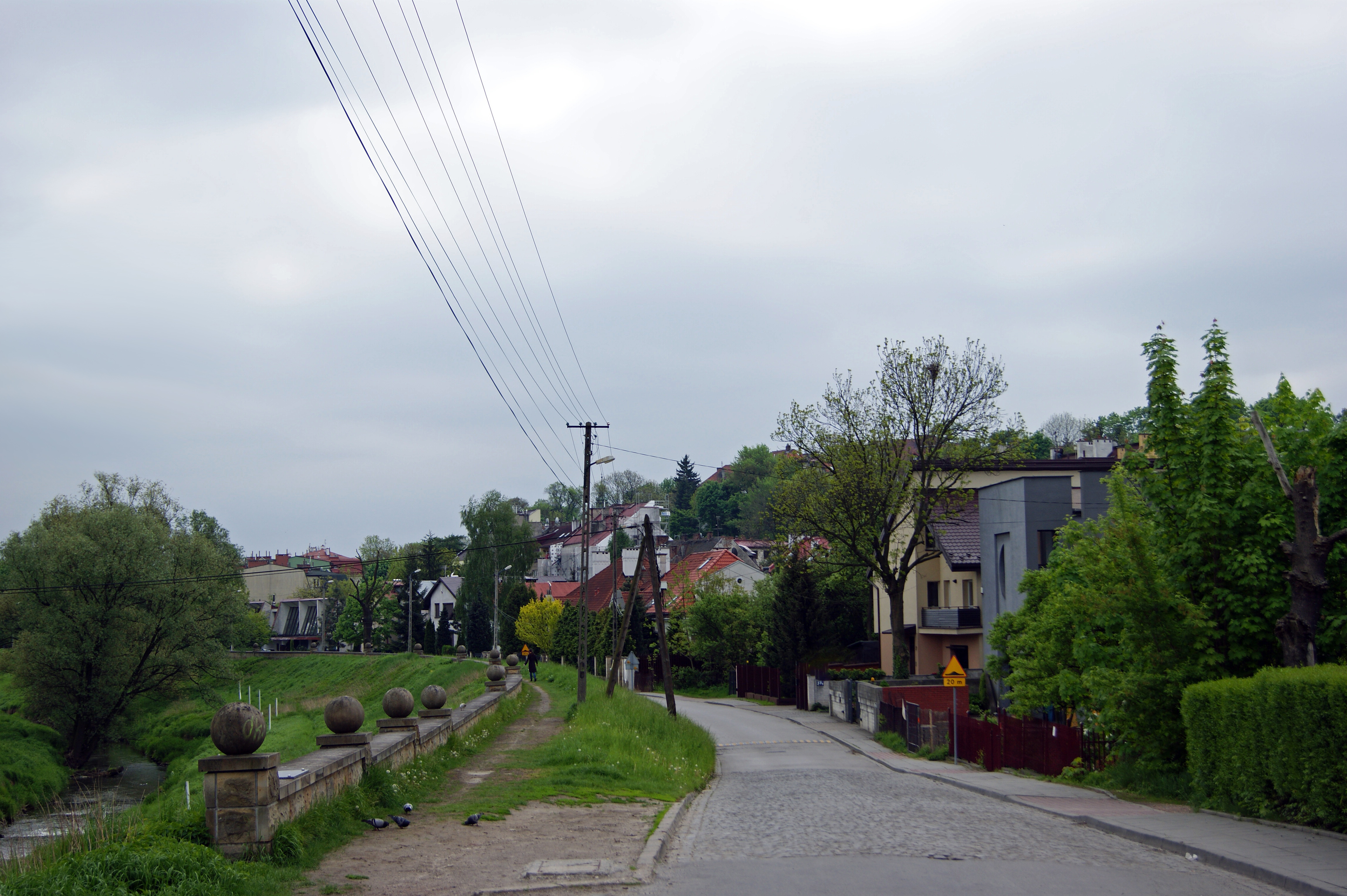
Emaus Street

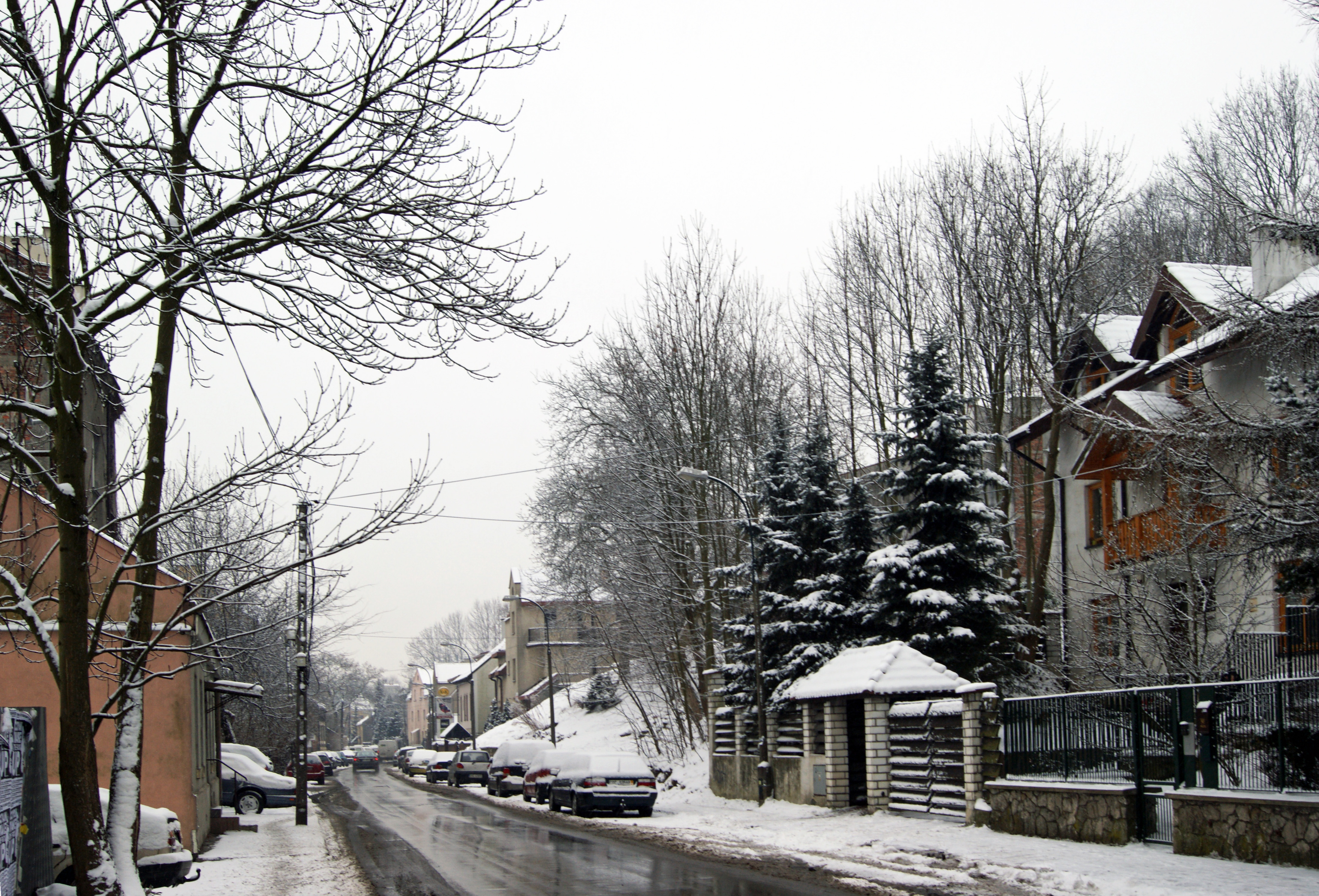
Królowej Jadwigi Street

== Bibliography ==
- (in Polish) * Praca zbiorowa Encyklopedia Krakowa, wydawca Biblioteka Kraków i Muzeum Krakowa, Kraków 2023, ISBN 978-83-66253-46-9 volume II pp 781-783(Encyclopedia of Krakow)
