= Church of St. Margaret and St. Judith, Kraków =

Roman Catholic church in Kraków, Poland

Church of St. Margaret and St. Judith
- Kościół św. Małgorzaty i św. Judyty
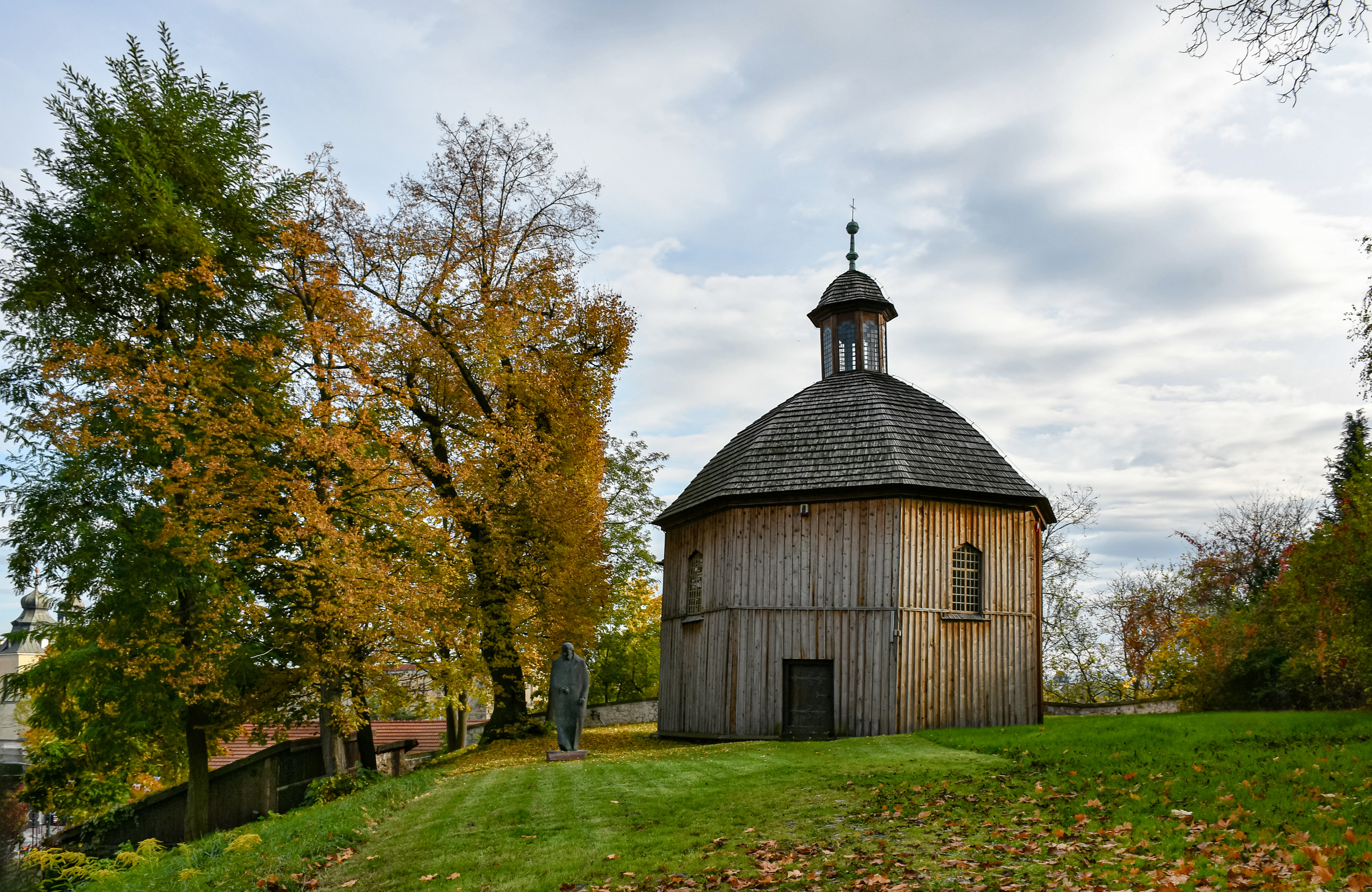
- View from NW
- Church of St. Margaret and St. Judith
- 50°03′09.2″N 19°54′45.6″E
- Location: Kraków
- Address: 8 św. Bronisławy Street
- Country: Poland
- Denomination: Roman Catholic

History
- Consecrated: 1680

The Church of St. Margaret and St. Judith (Polish: Kościół św. Katarzyny i św. Judyty), is a historic Roman Catholic filial church of the Norbertine Sisters located at 8 św. Bronisławy Street in Zwierzyniec, the former district of Kraków, Poland.

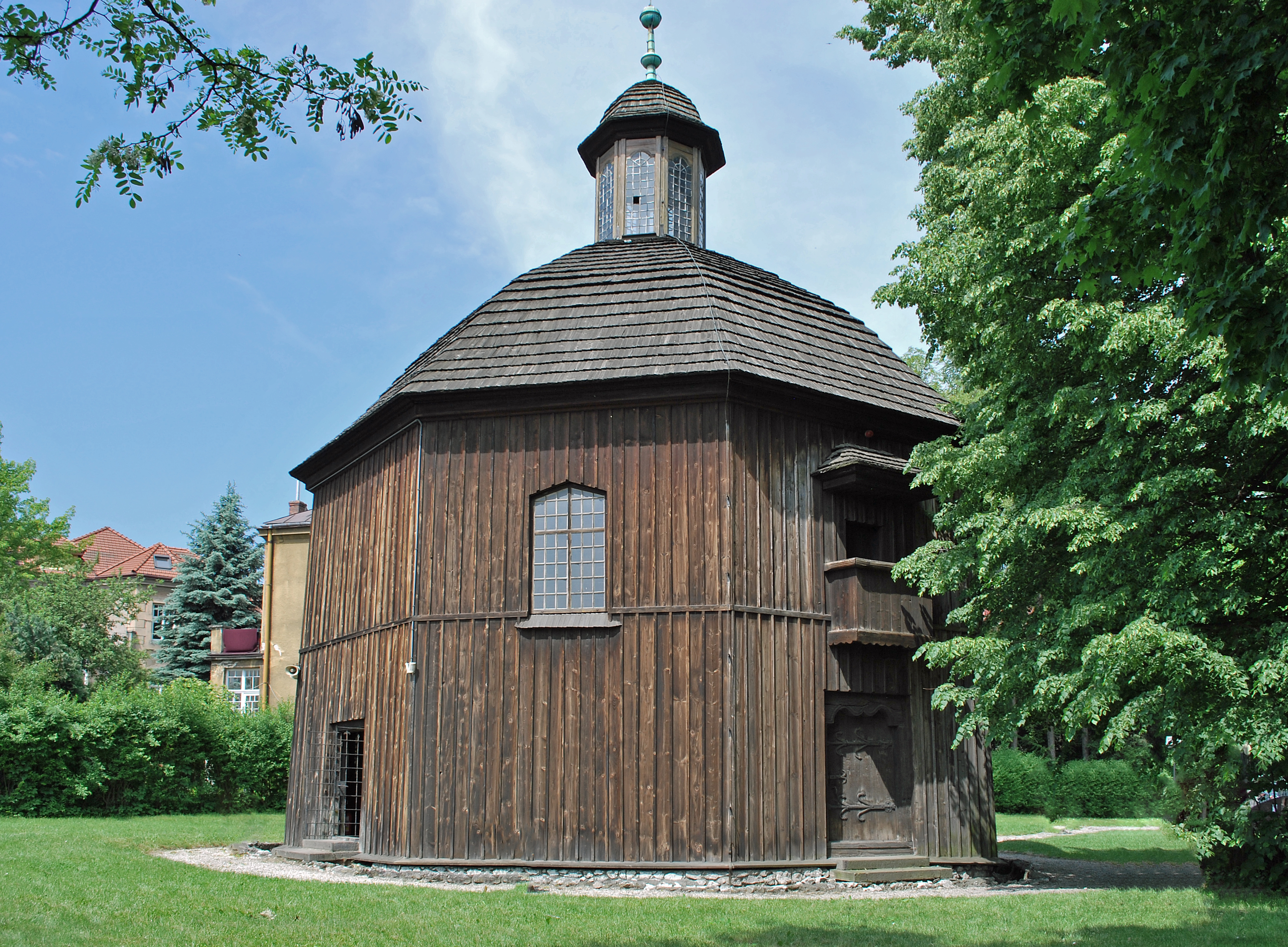
Main entrance and choir

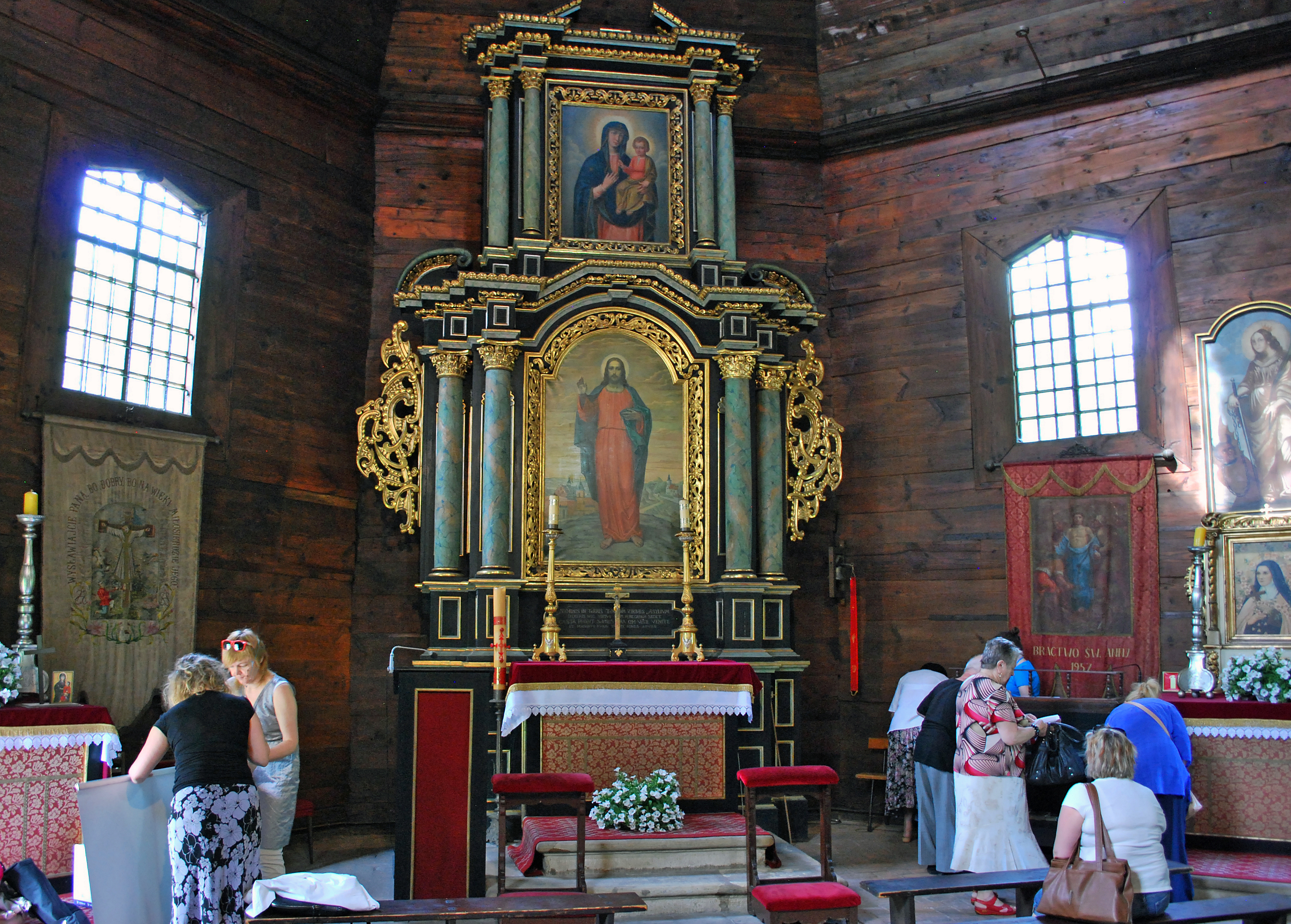
Interior

== See also ==
- Church of St. Augustine and St. John the Baptist, Kraków
- Church of the Holy Saviour, Kraków

== Bibliography ==
- (in Polish) * Praca zbiorowa Encyklopedia Krakowa, wydawca Biblioteka Kraków i Muzeum Krakowa, Kraków 2023, ISBN 978-83-66253-46-9 volume I page 850 (Encyclopedia of Krakow)
