= Church of the Holy Saviour, Kraków =

Roman Catholic church in Kraków, Poland

Church of the Holy Saviour
- Kościół Najświętszego Salwatora
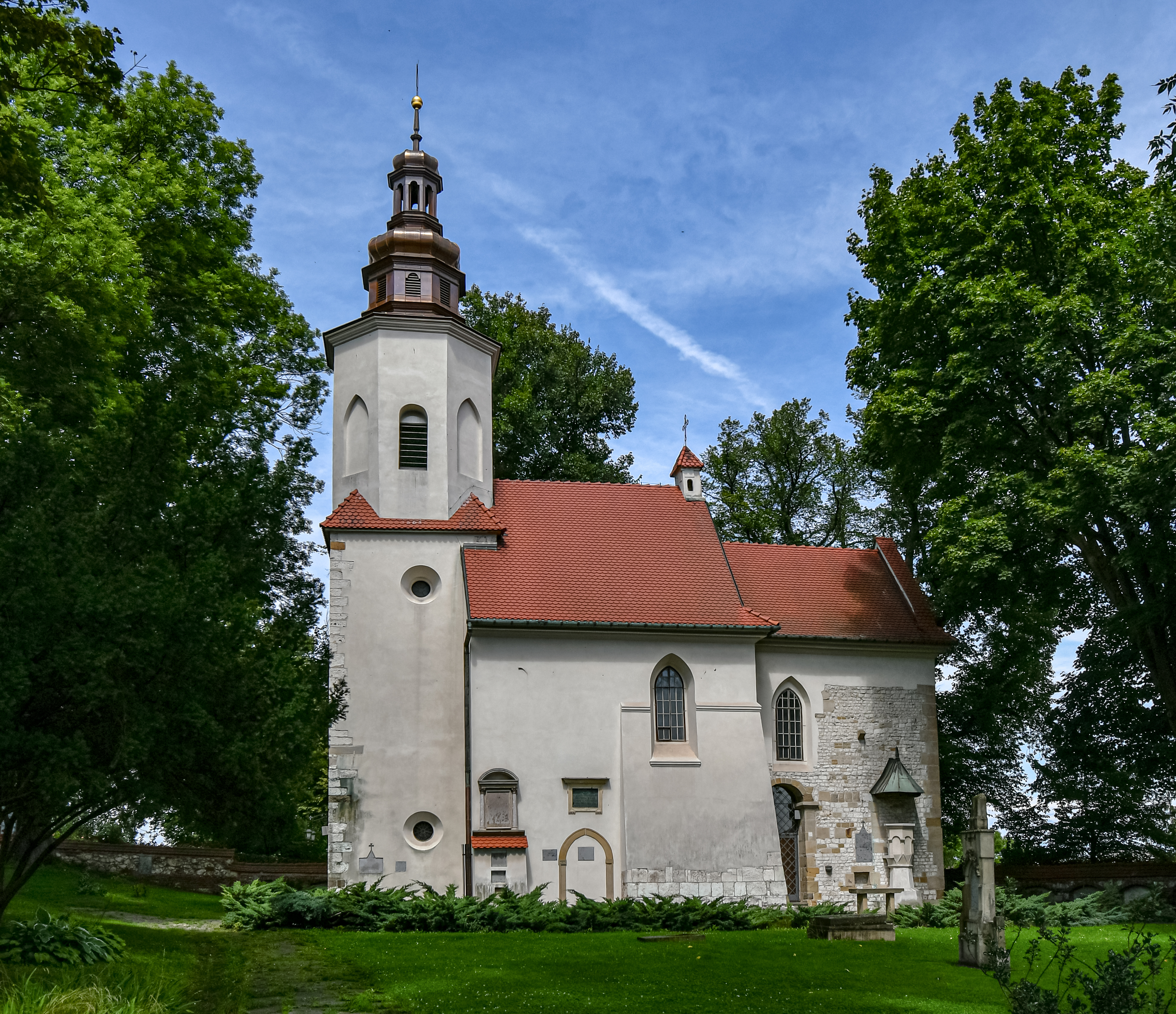
- Church of the Holy Saviour
- 50°03′12.4″N 19°54′44.4″E
- Location: Kraków
- Address: 9 św. Bronisławy Street
- Country: Poland
- Denomination: Roman Catholic
- Website: https://www.norbertanki.w.krakow.pl/wp/

History
- Consecrated: 1148

The Church of the Holy Saviour (Polish: Kościół Najświętszego Salwatora) is a historic Roman Catholic filial church of the Norbertine Sisters located at 9 św. Bronisławy Street in Zwierzyniec, the former district of Kraków, Poland.

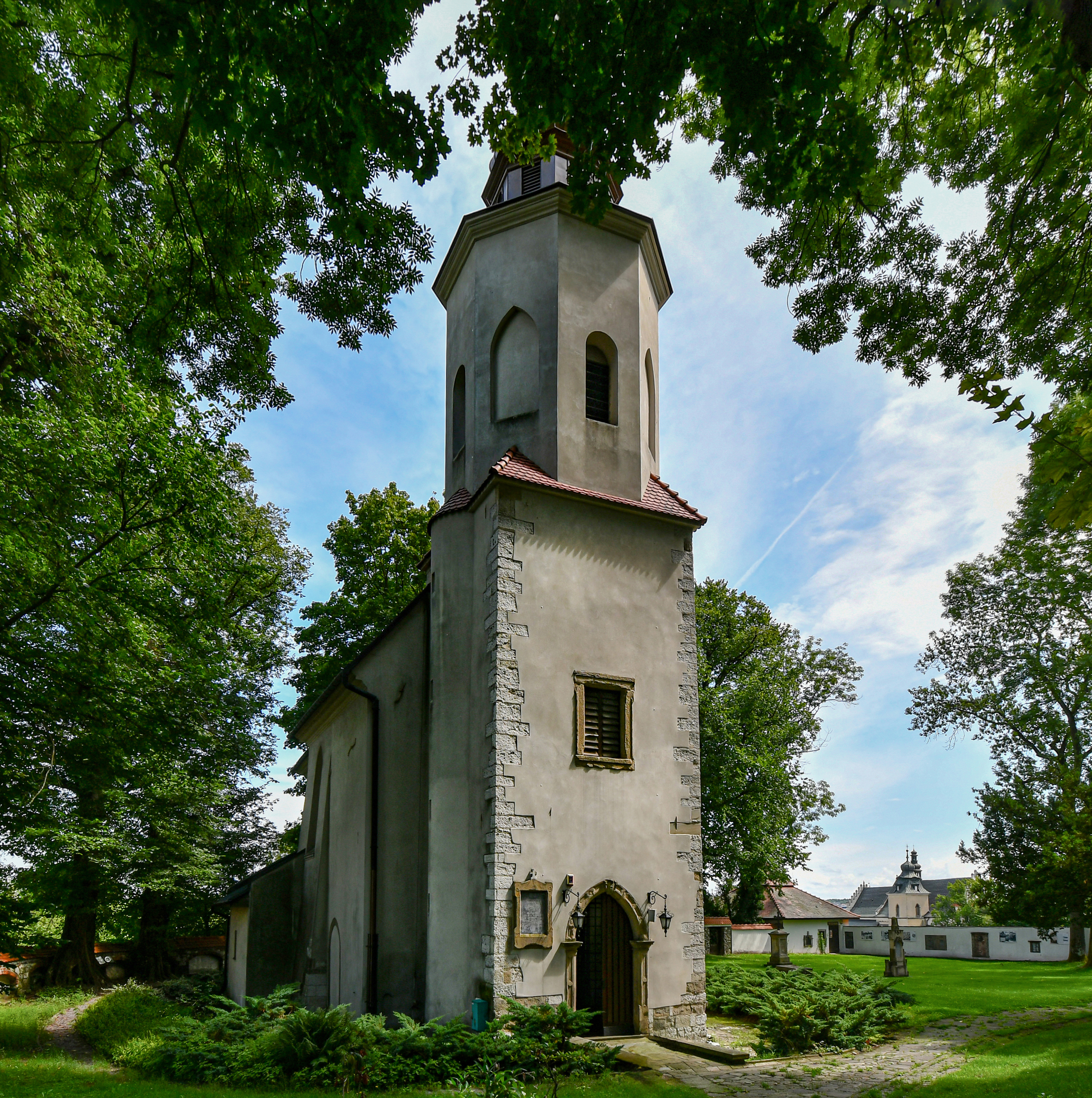
Front view, bell tower and porch

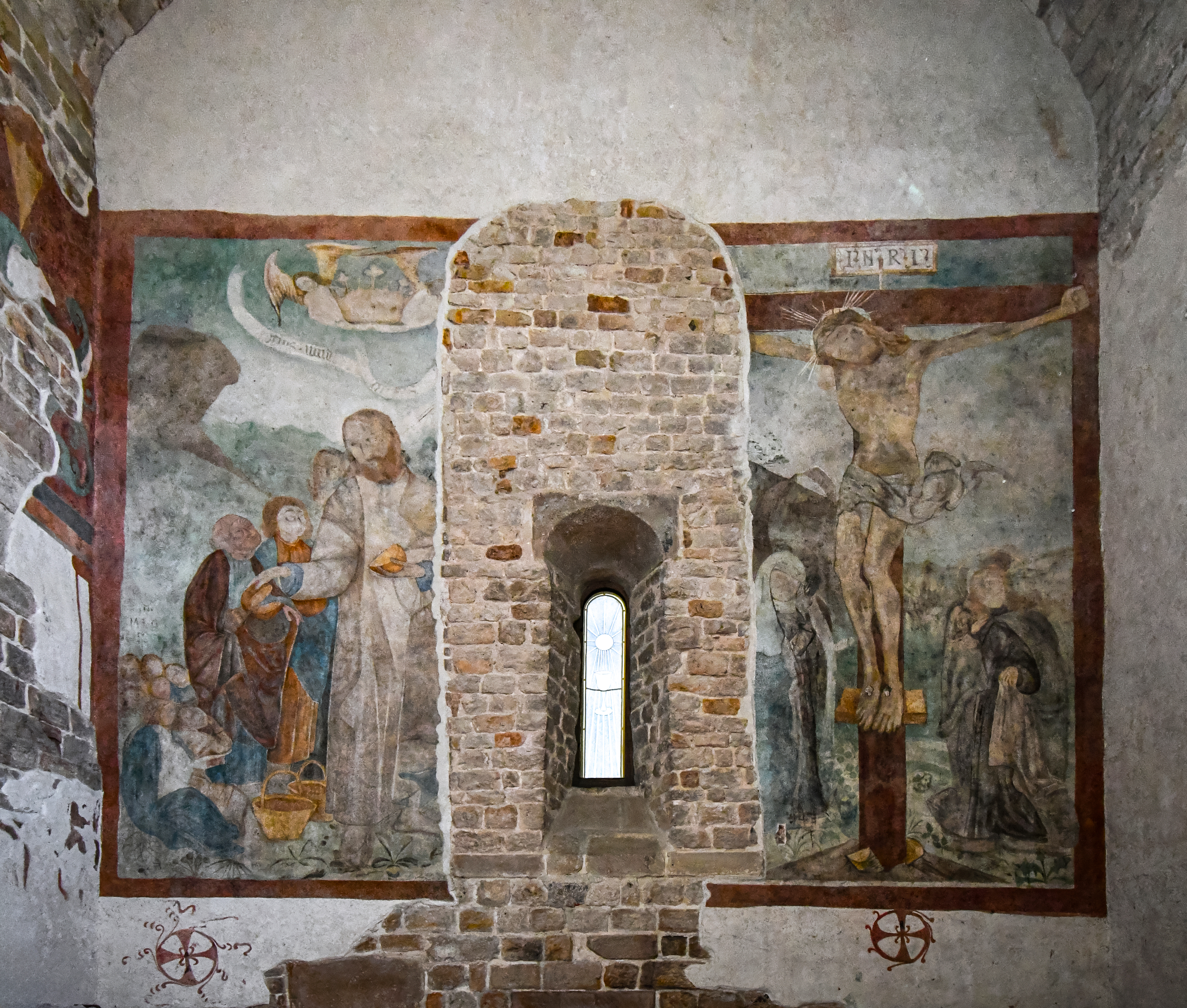
Polychrome in the presbytery

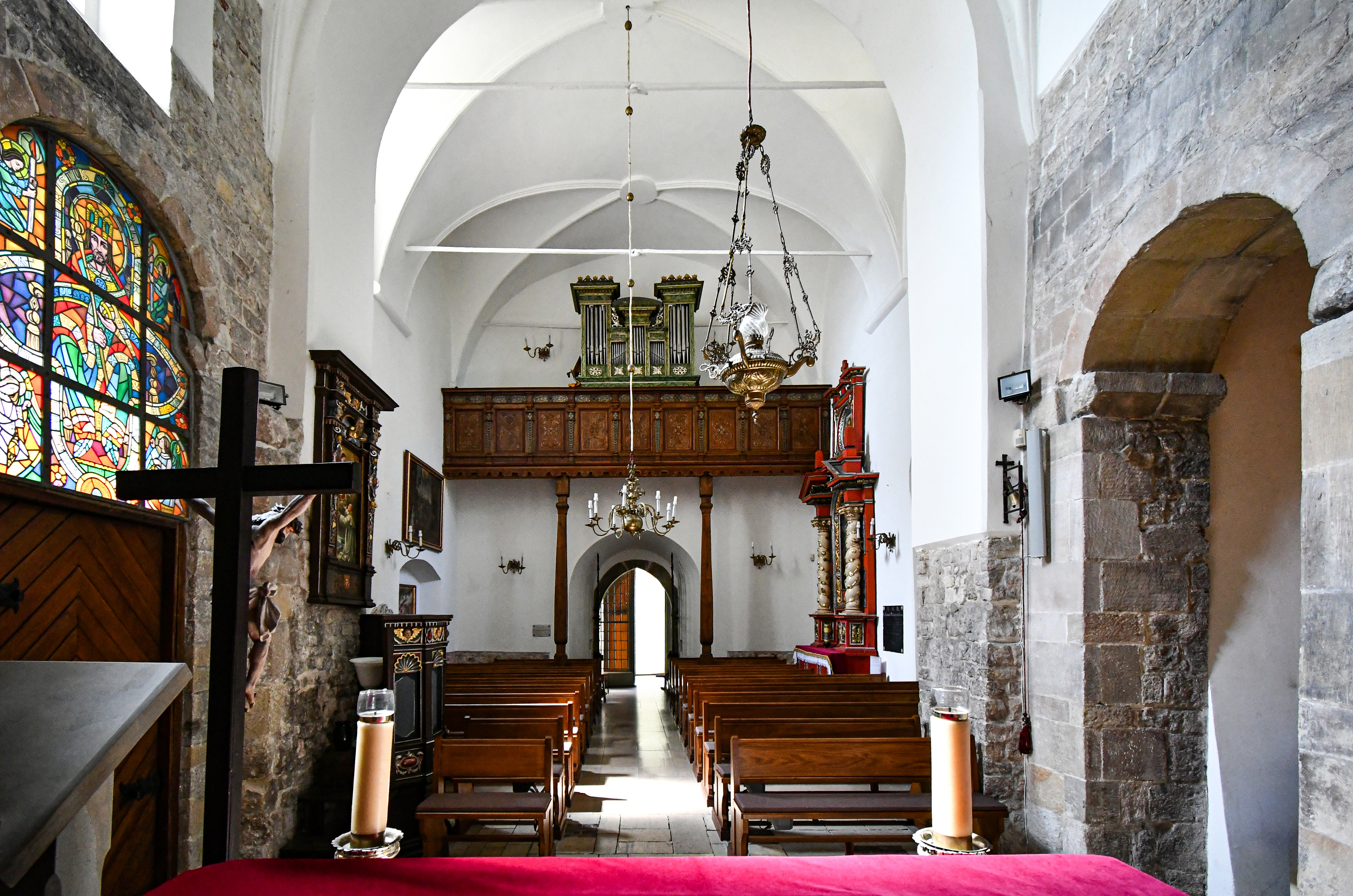
Interior, choir

== See also ==
- Church of St. Augustine and St. John the Baptist, Kraków
- Church of St. Margaret and St. Judith, Kraków

== Bibliography ==
- Michał Rożek, Barbara Gądkowa Leksykon kościołów Krakowa, Wydawnictwo Verso, Kraków 2003, ISBN 83-919281-0-1 pp. 124–125. (Lexicon of Krakow churches) (in Polish)
- Praca zbiorowa Encyklopedia Krakowa, wydawca Biblioteka Kraków i Muzeum Krakowa, Kraków 2023, ISBN 978-83-66253-46-9 volume I pp. 730–731. (Encyclopedia of Krakow) (in Polish)
