= Church of St. Augustine and St. John the Baptist, Kraków =

Roman Catholic church in Kraków, Poland

Church of St. Augustine and St. John the Baptist
- Kościół św. Augustyna i św. Jana Chrzciciela
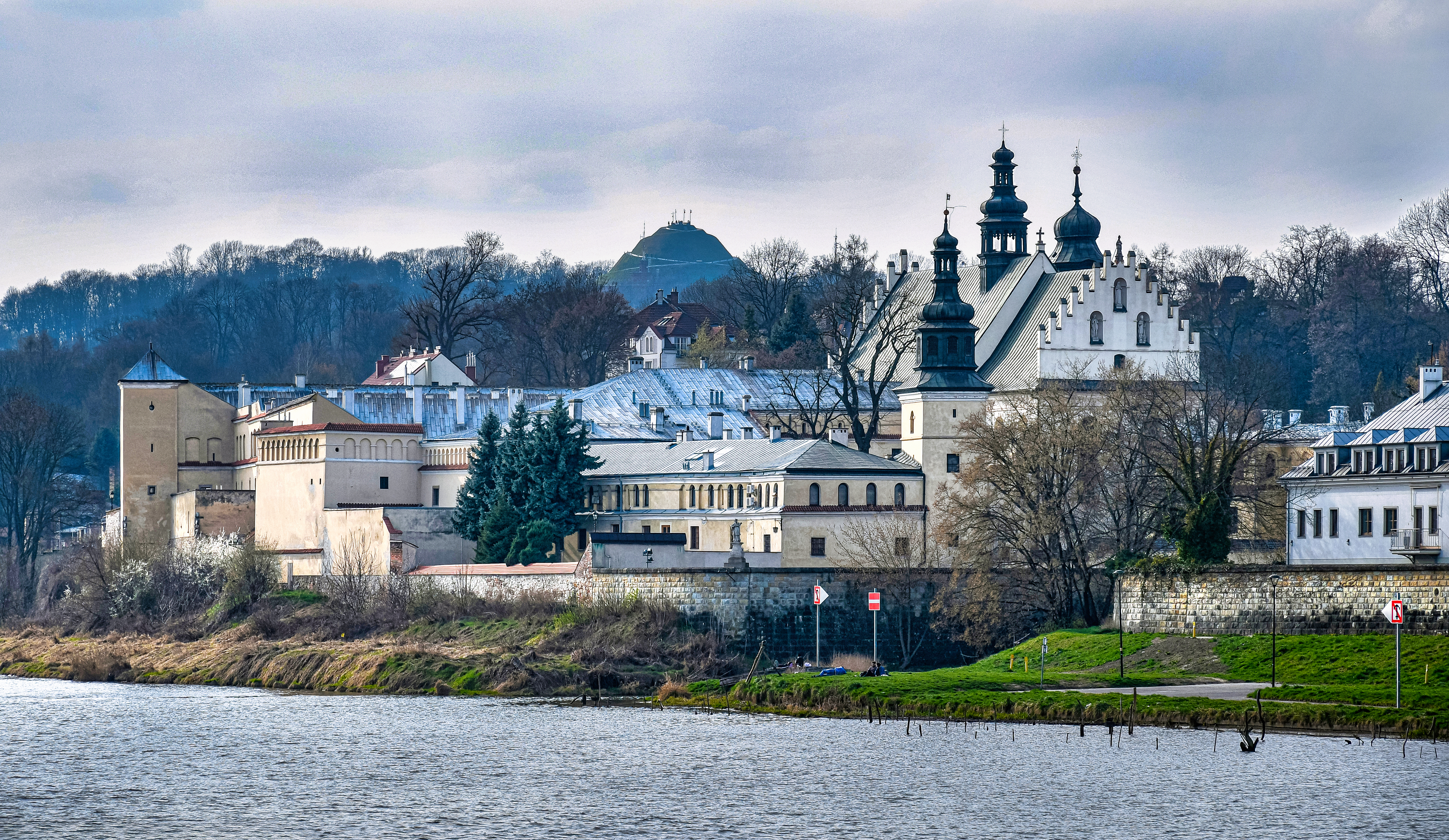
- Vistula, church, monastery and Kościuszko Mound. View from the east.
- Church of St. Augustine and St. John the Baptist
- 50°03′07.5″N 19°54′53″E
- Location: Kraków
- Address: 88 T. Kościuszki Street
- Country: Poland
- Denomination: Roman Catholic
- Website: https://www.norbertanki.w.krakow.pl/wp/

History
- Consecrated: 1181

The Church of St. Augustine and St. John the Baptist (Polish: Kościół św. Augustyna i św. Jana Chrzciciela) known colloquially as the Norbertine Sisters Church (Polish: Kościół norbertanek) is a historic Roman Catholic parish and conventual church of the Norbertine Sisters located at 88 Tadeusza Kościuszki Street, in Zwierzyniec the former district of Kraków, Poland.

== History ==
The monastery and church were founded by Jaksa Gryfita probably in 1162, so tradition says. It was built in the Romanesque style. It was destroyed during the Mongol invasions in 1241, 1260 and 1287 and rebuilt in the same style. The remains of these buildings are a Romanesque portal in the porch.

The rebuilt monastery had a defensive character. The existing walls date back to the reign of the Polish king Władysław II Jagiełło (ruled 1386 and 1434).

Its current appearance dates back to its reconstruction between 1596 and 1626. They rebuilt the monastery and the church Giovanni Battista Trevano and Giovanni Petrini.

== Interior of church ==
Church building is oriented, has a single nave. The nave is Baroque and the presbytery is Classicist. In the main altar there is a painting John the Baptist by Władysław Łuszczkiewicz. In the left side altar there is the reliquary of Blessed Bronislava.

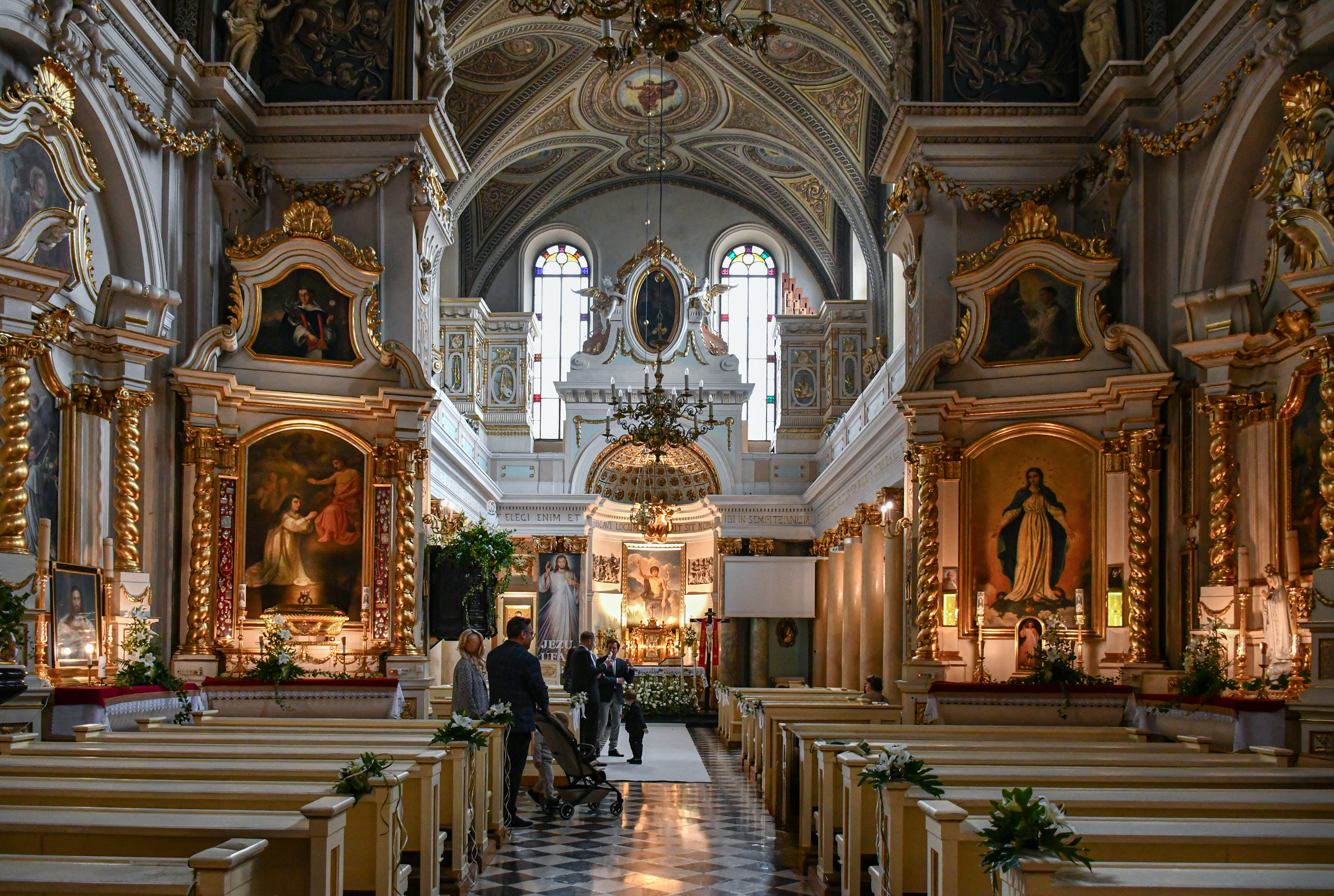
Interior of the church

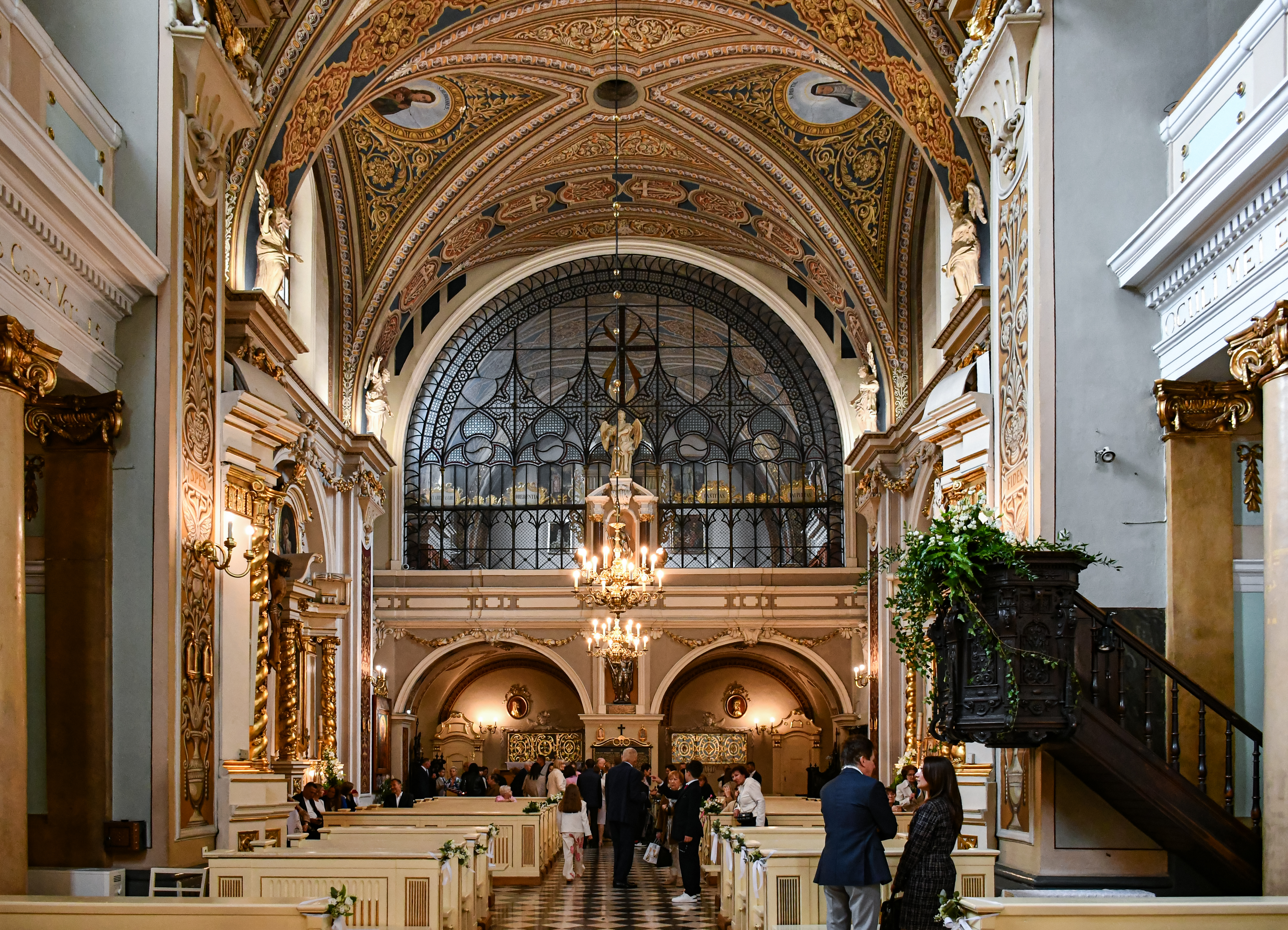
Interior-choir

== See also ==
- Church of St. Margaret and St. Judith, Kraków
- Church of the Holy Saviour, Kraków

== Bibliography ==
- (in Polish) * Michał Rożek, Barbara Gądkowa Leksykon kościołów Krakowa, Wydawnictwo Verso, Kraków 2003, ISBN 83-919281-0-1 pp 19-21 (Lexicon of Krakow churches)
- (in Polish) * Praca zbiorowa Encyklopedia Krakowa, wydawca Biblioteka Kraków i Muzeum Krakowa, Kraków 2023, ISBN 978-83-66253-46-9 volume I page 740 (Encyclopedia of Krakow)
