= Gothic Revival architecture in Poland =

Gothic Revival architecture was developed in Poland mainly after the country was partitioned between Prussia, Austria and Russia. It was popular especially in the Prussian partition of Poland. Gothic Revival architecture In Poland often has certain features, derived from the characteristic Polish Brick Gothic architecture style. Churches, schools, post offices, government buildings and palaces were often built in this style. Notable authors of the Polish Gothic Revival style are Jan Sas Zubrzycki, Feliks Księżarski, Józef Pius Dziekoński, and Enrico Marconi.

== Gallery ==
Churches and chapels

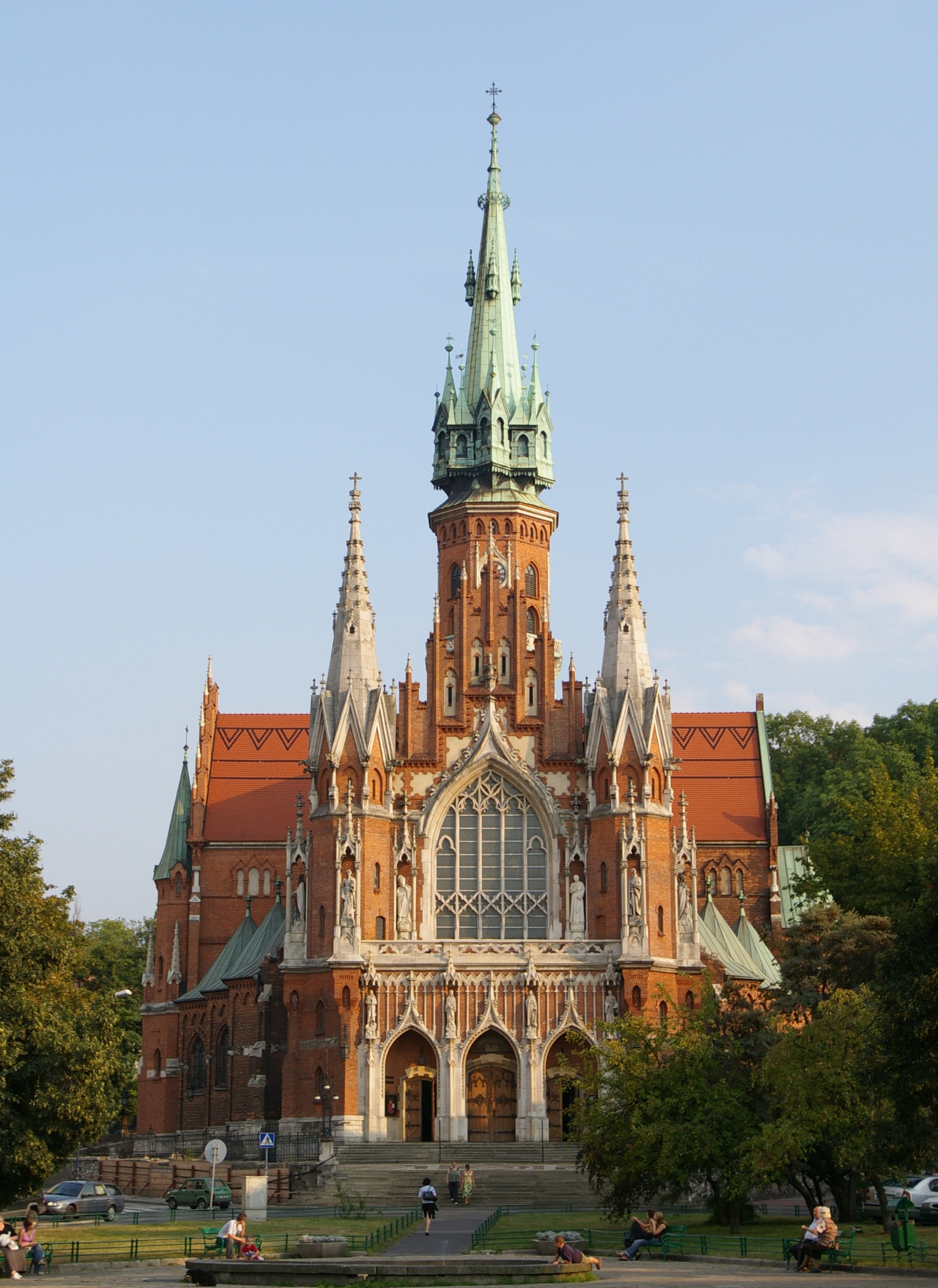
St. Joseph's Church, Kraków

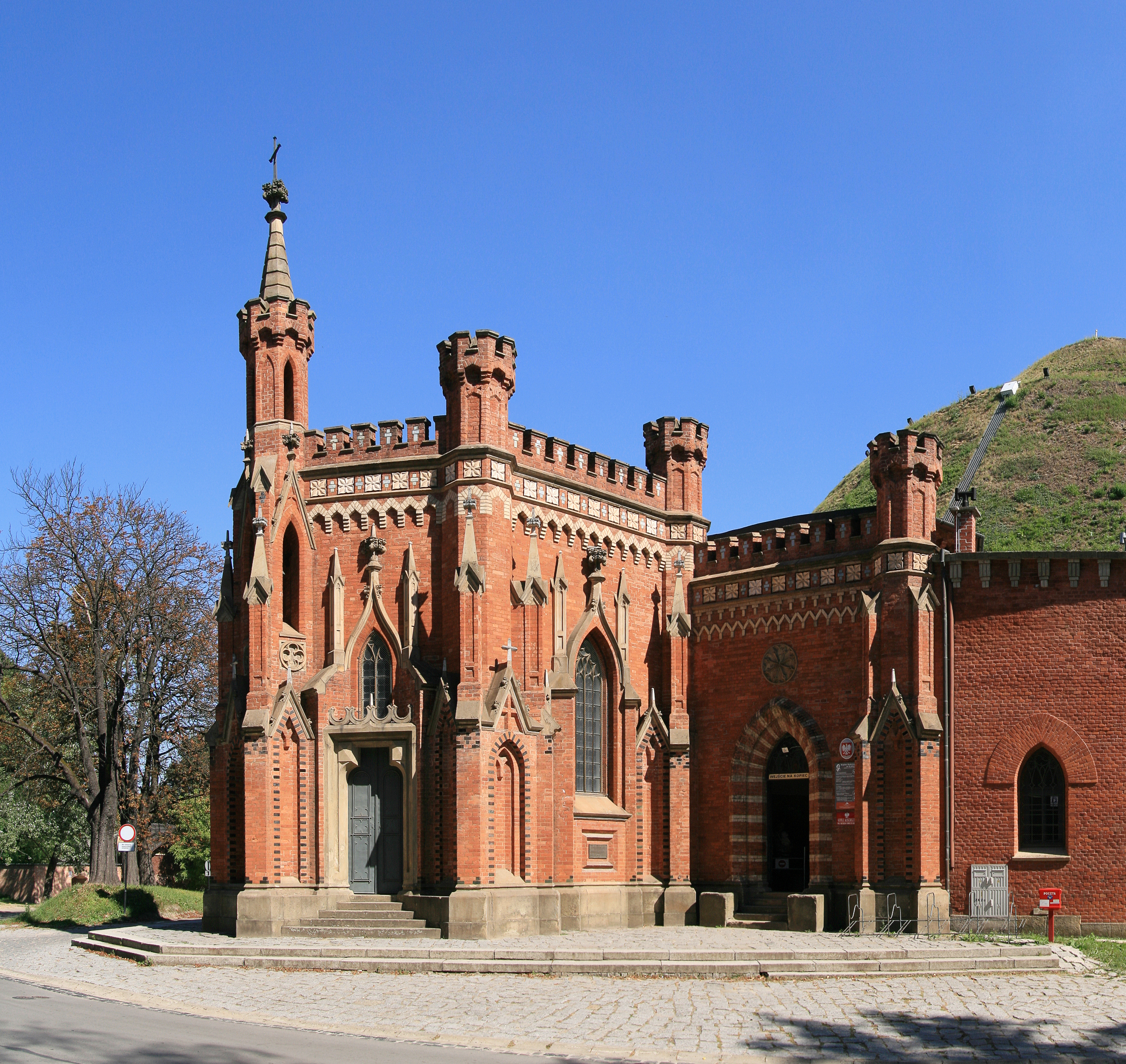
Blessed Bronisława Chapel, Kraków

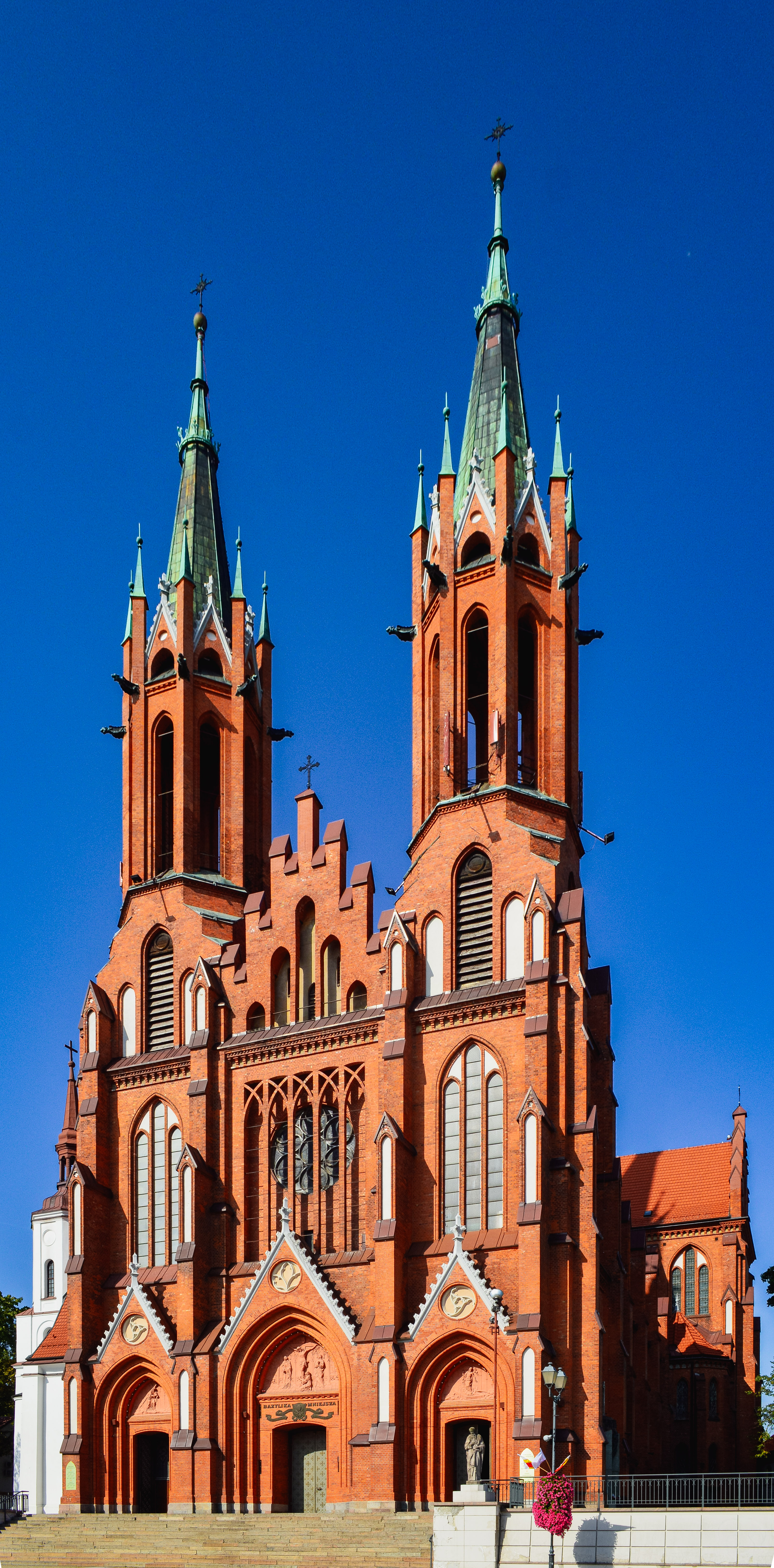
Białystok Cathedral, Białystok

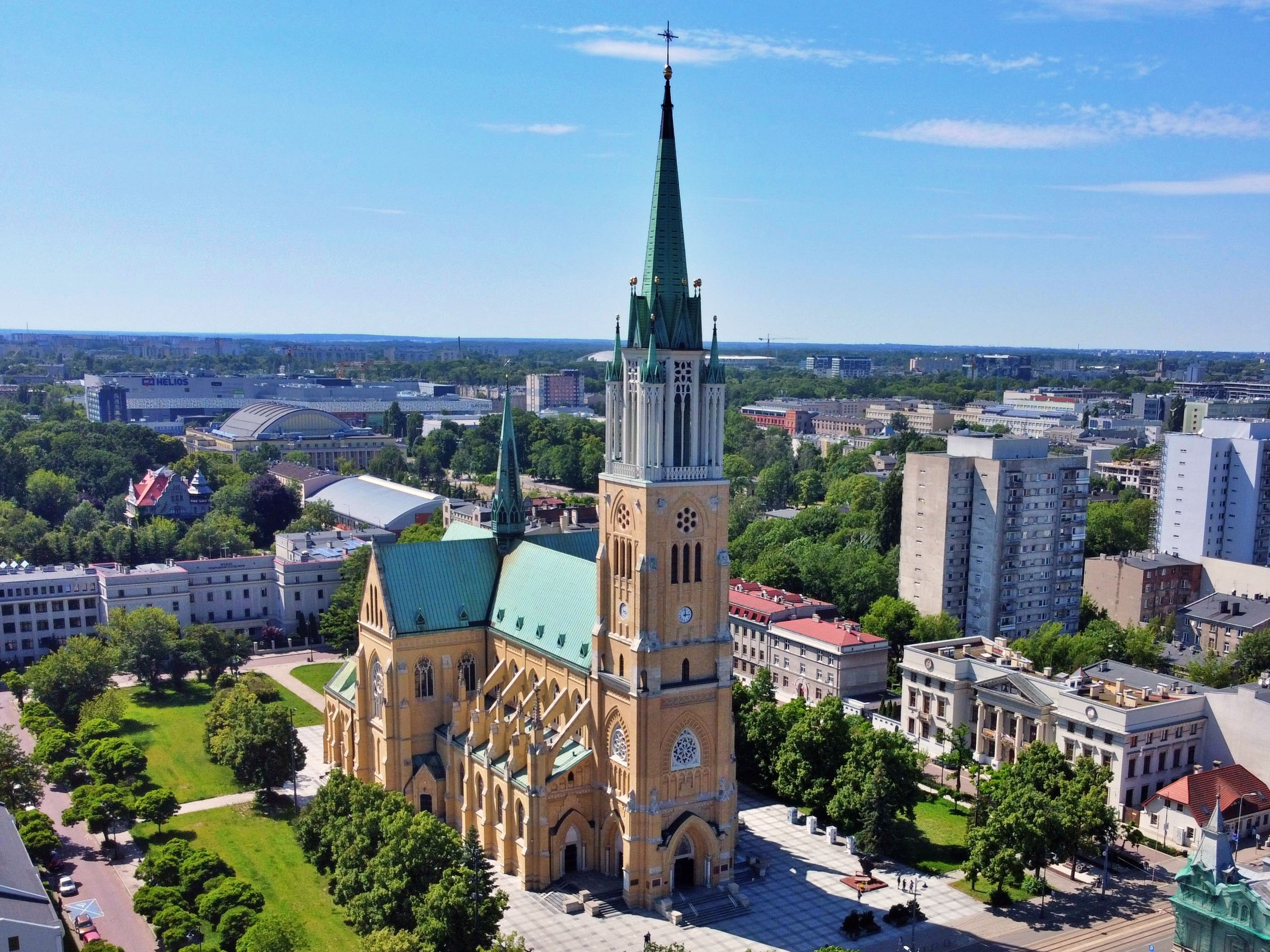
Łódź Cathedral, Łódź

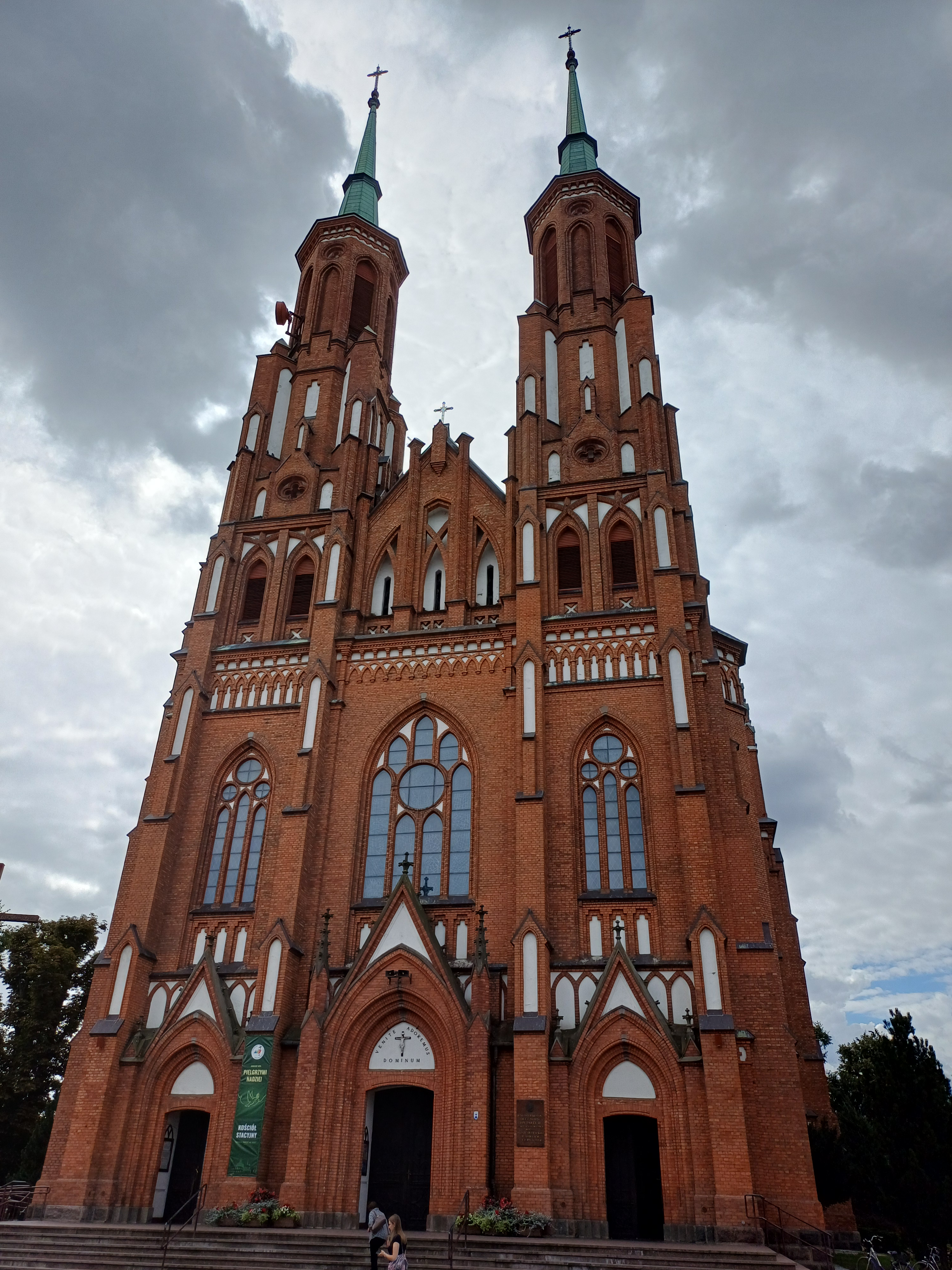
Siedlce Cathedral, Siedlce

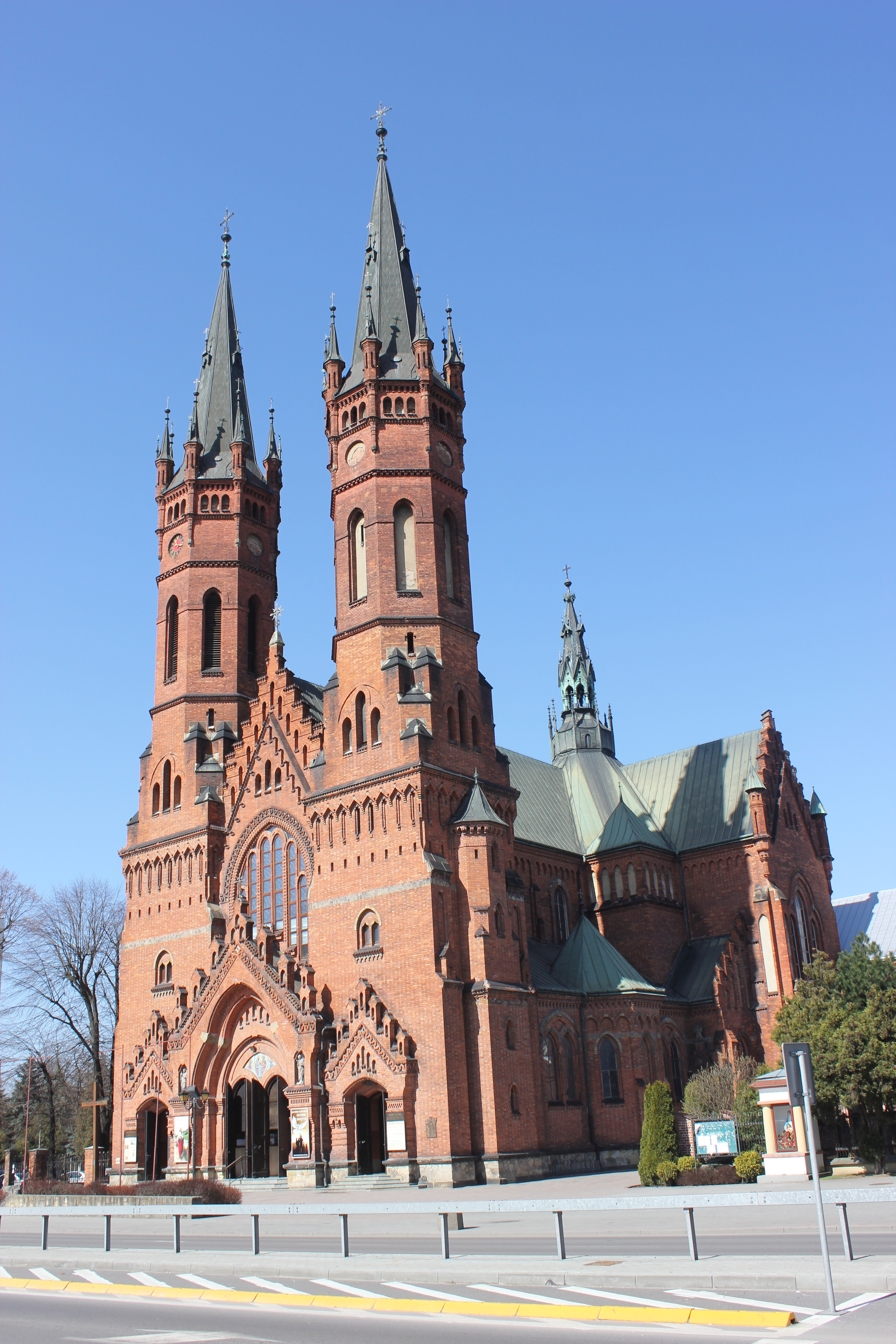
Holy Family Church, Tarnów

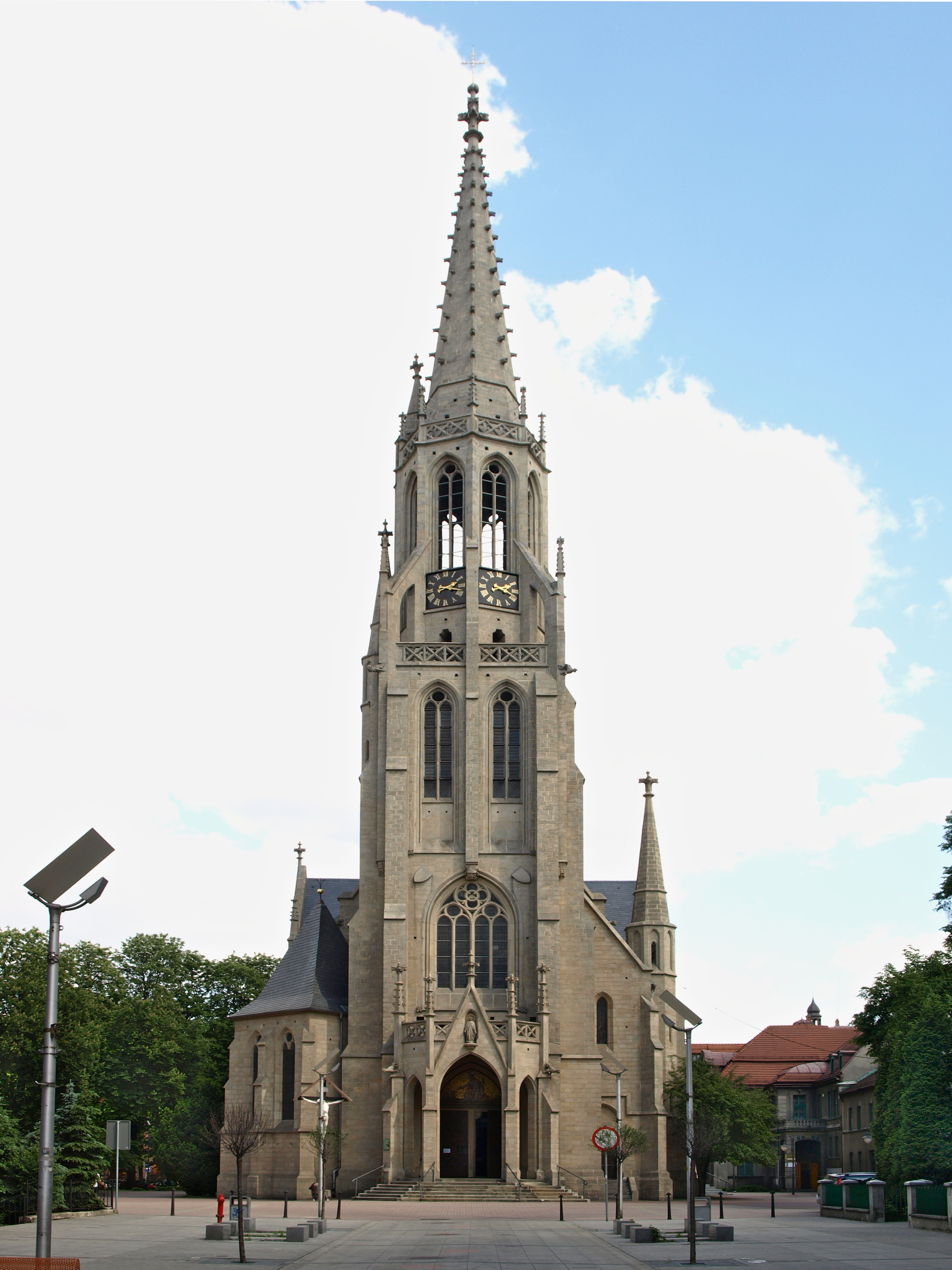
St. Mary's Church, Katowice

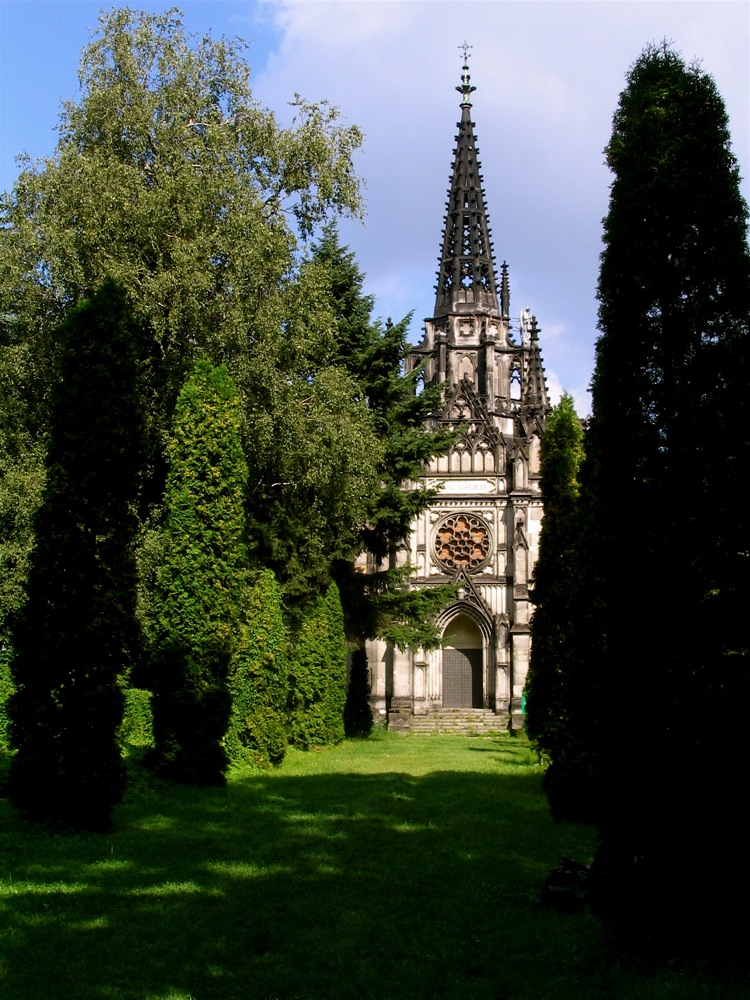
Karl Scheibler's Chapel, Łódź

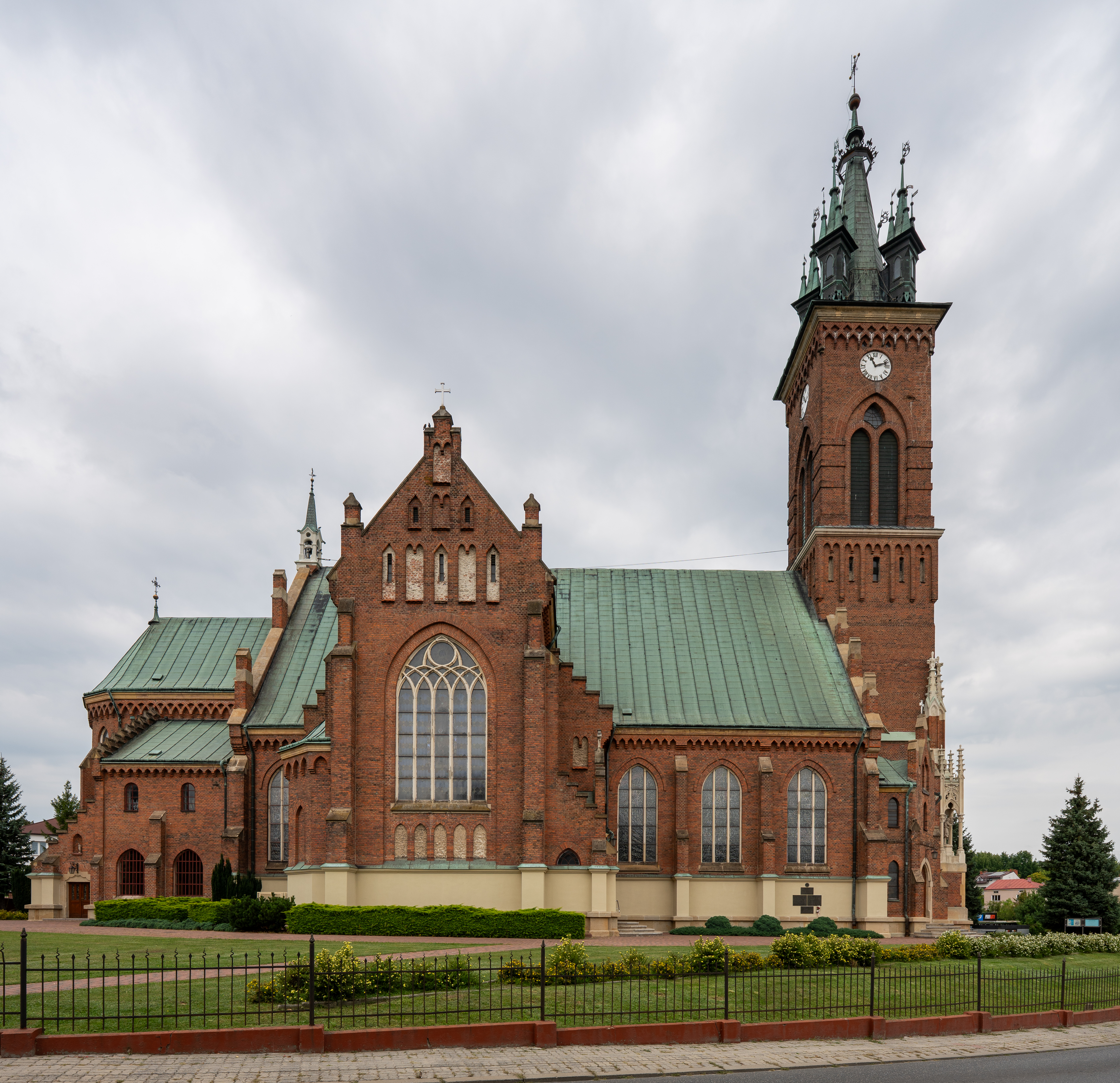
St. John Church, Sokołów Małopolski

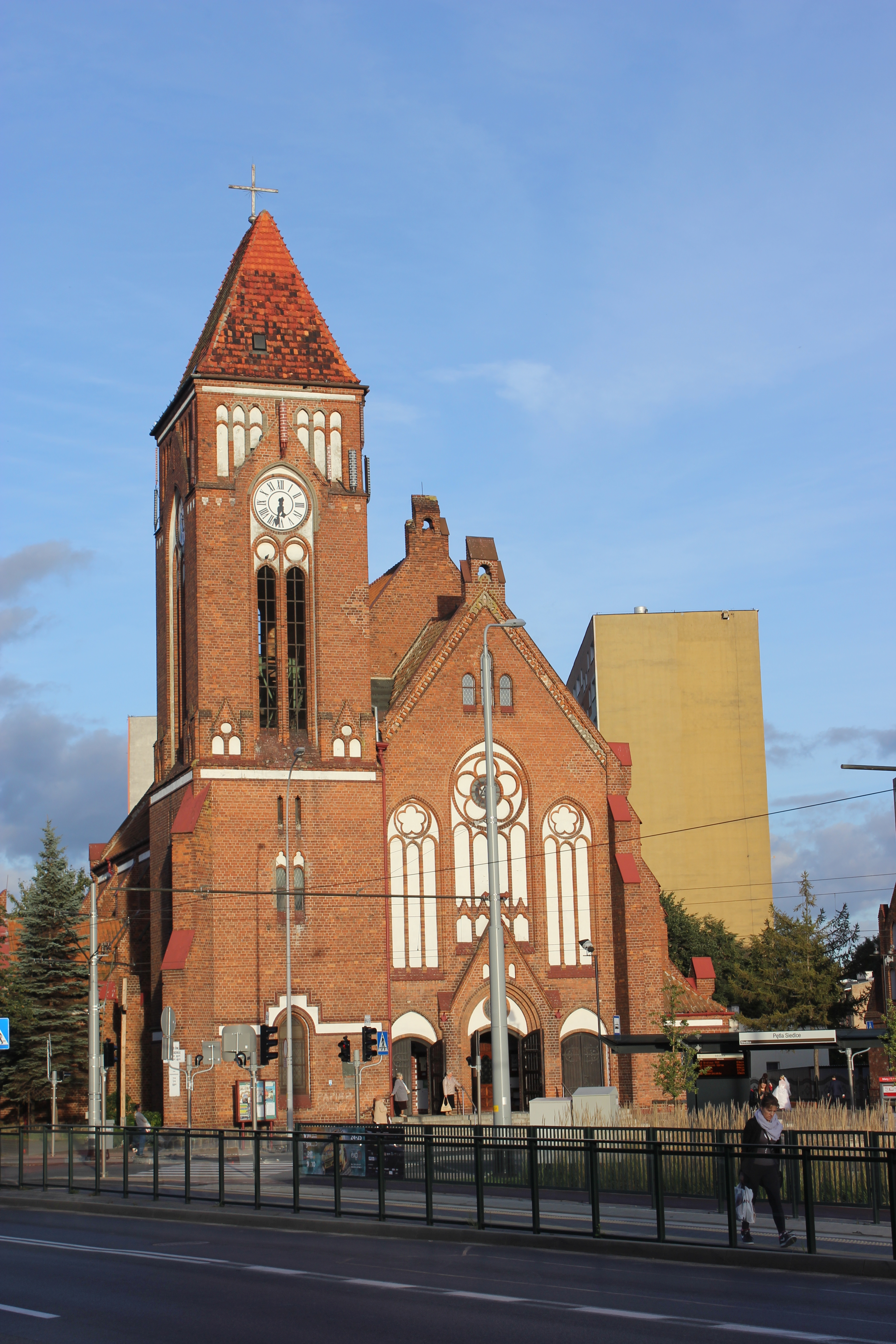
St. Francis of Assisi Church, Gdańsk

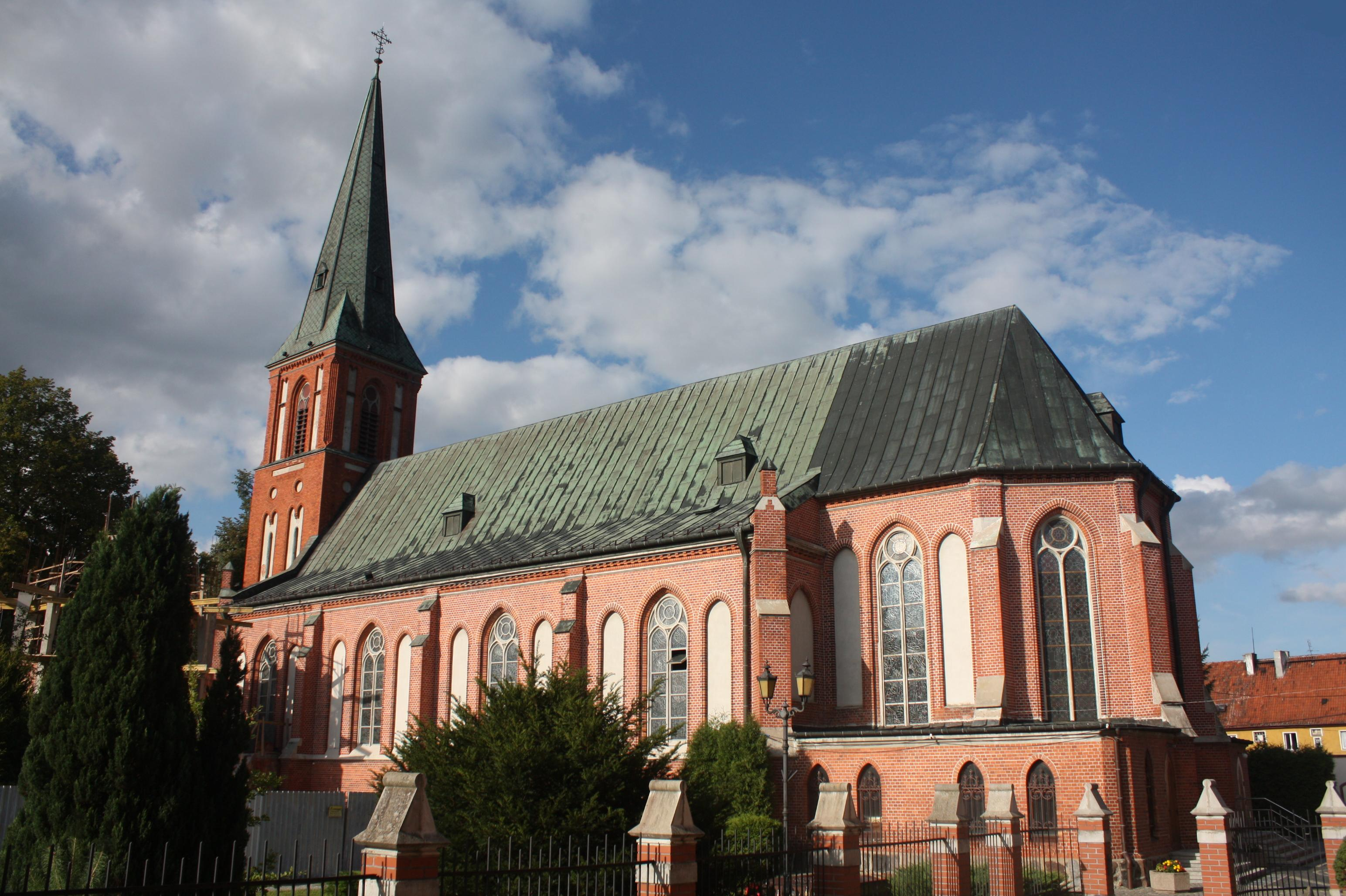
Ełk Cathedral, Ełk

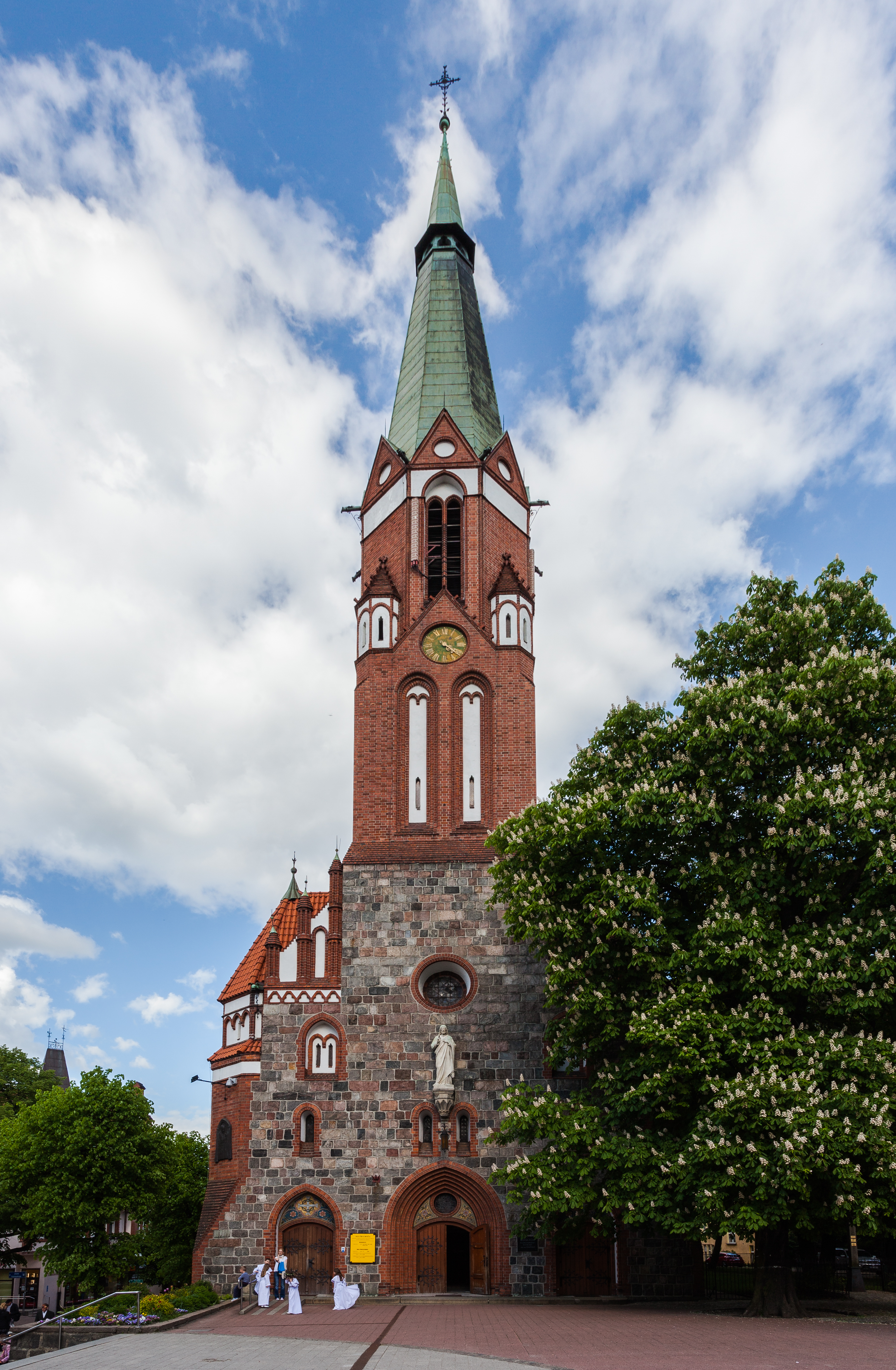
St. George Church, Sopot

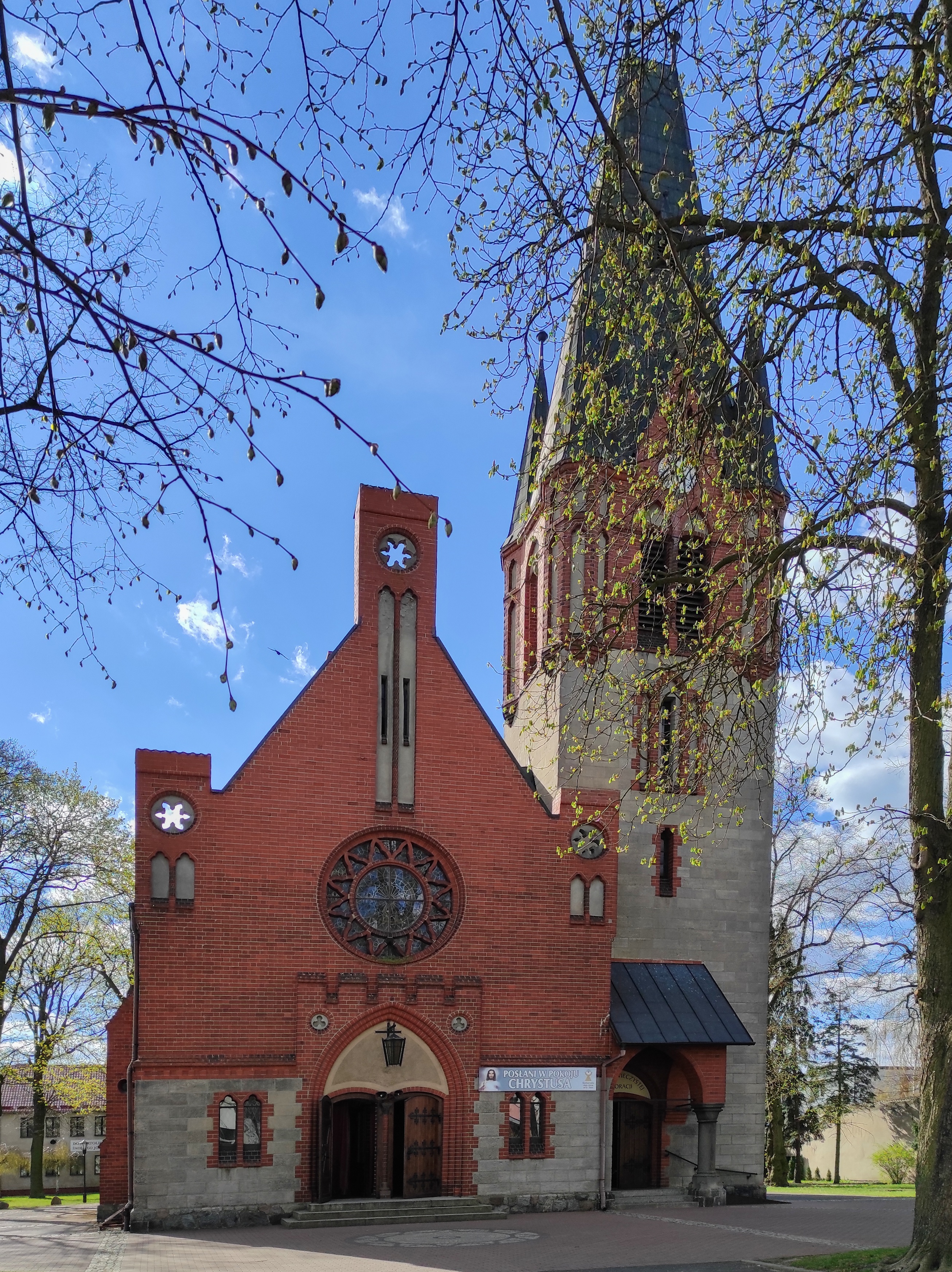
St. Joseph Church, Opalenica
Post offices

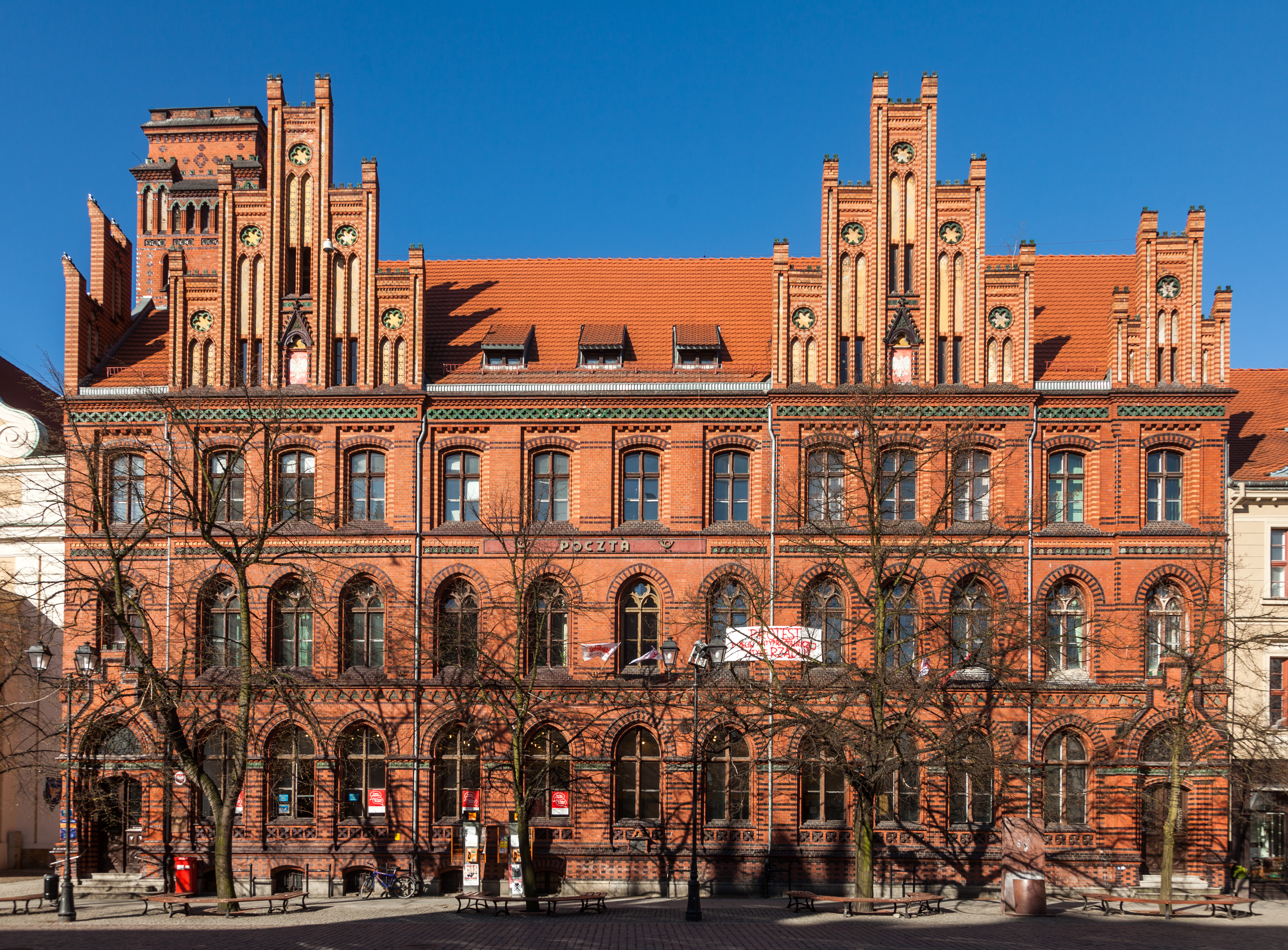
Toruń

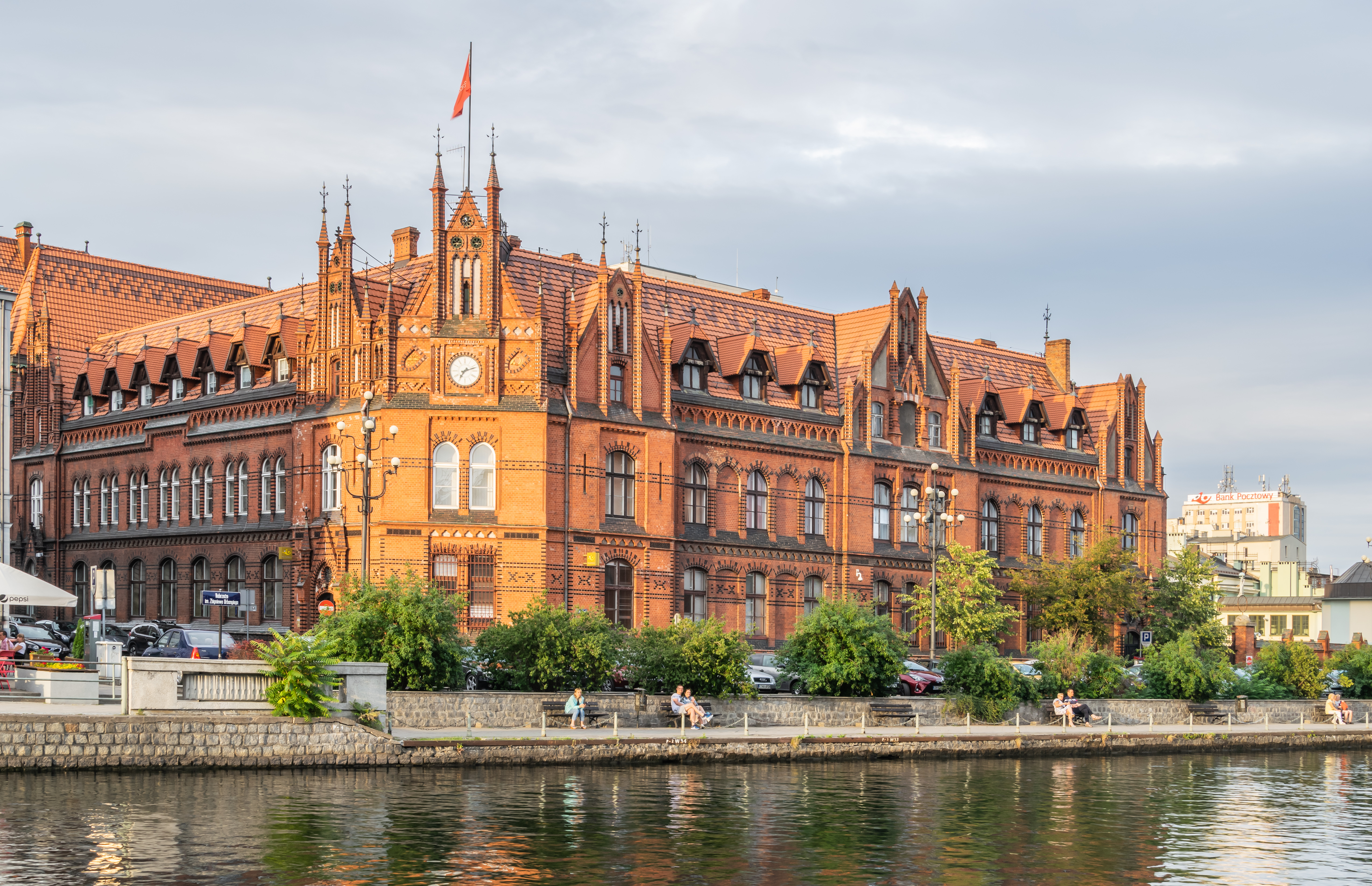
Bydgoszcz

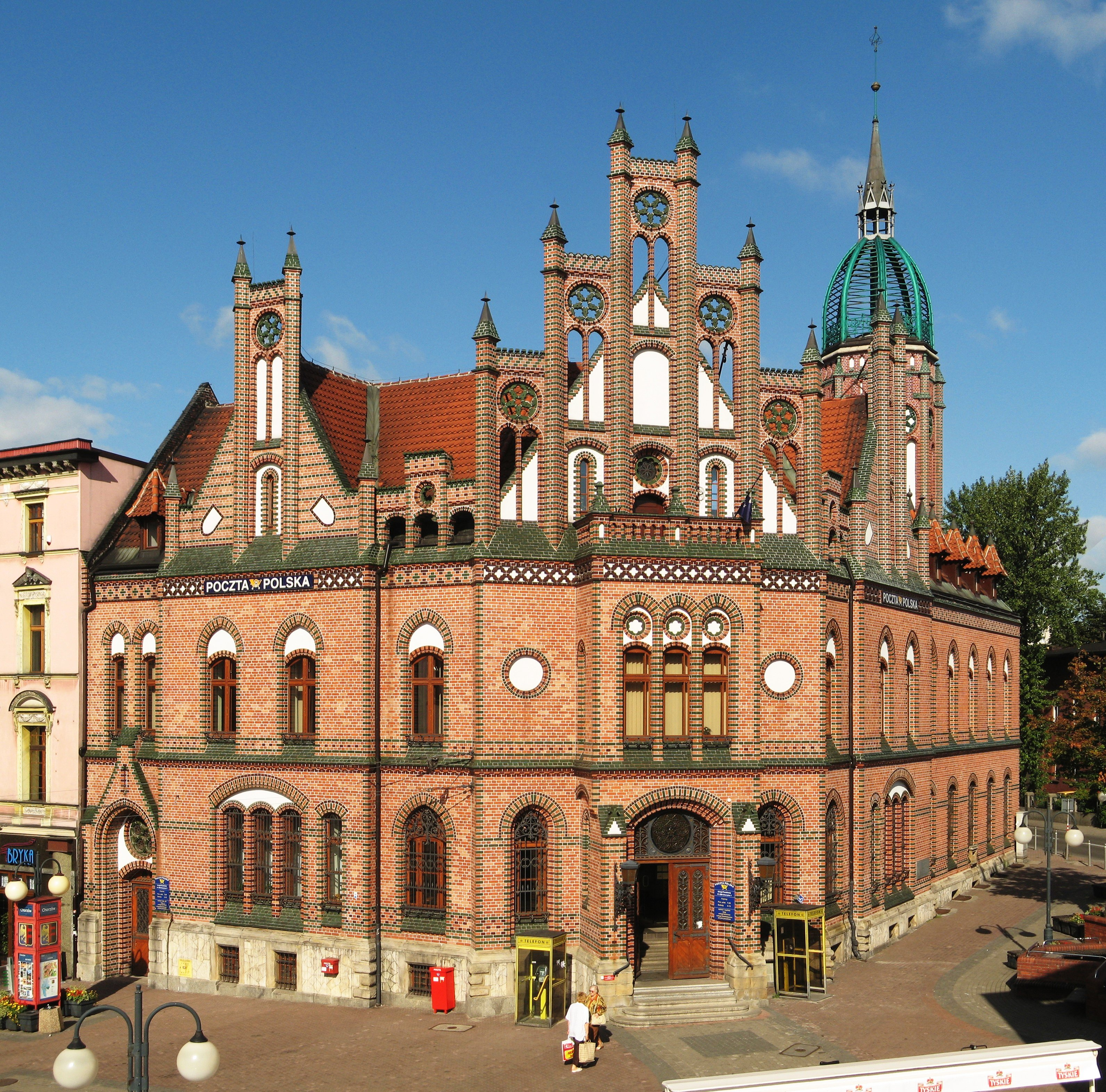
Chorzów

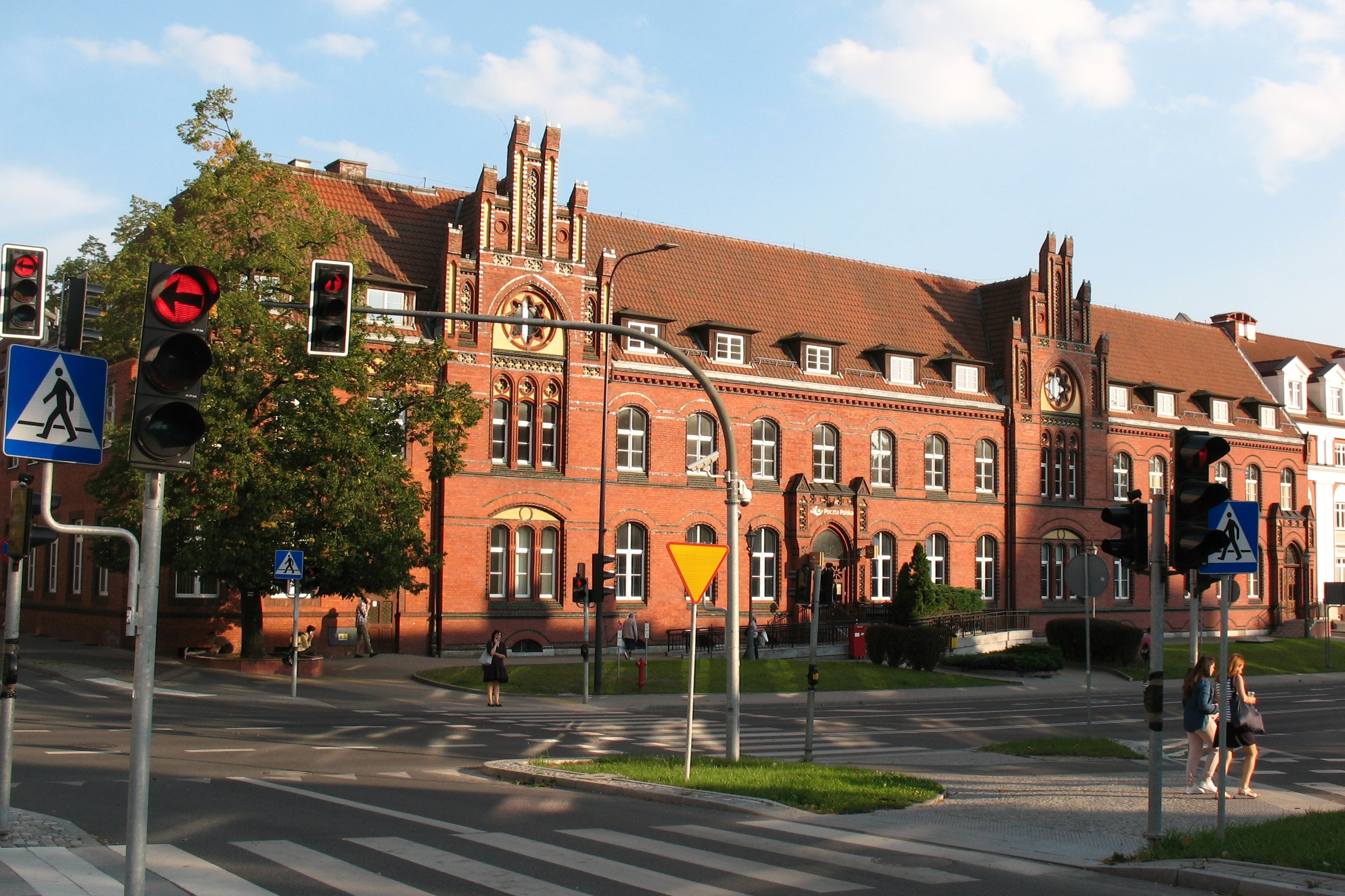
Olsztyn

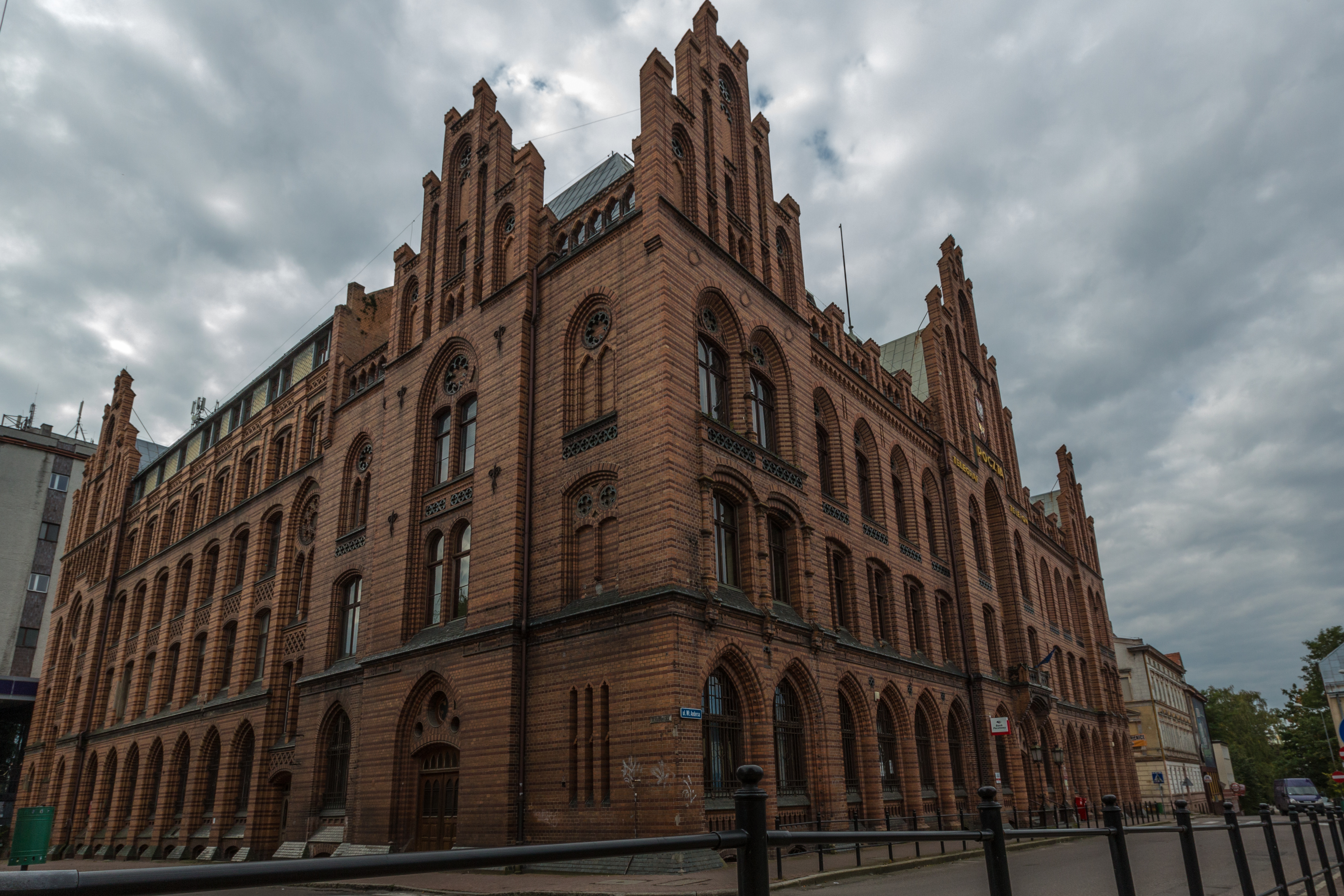
Koszalin
Town halls

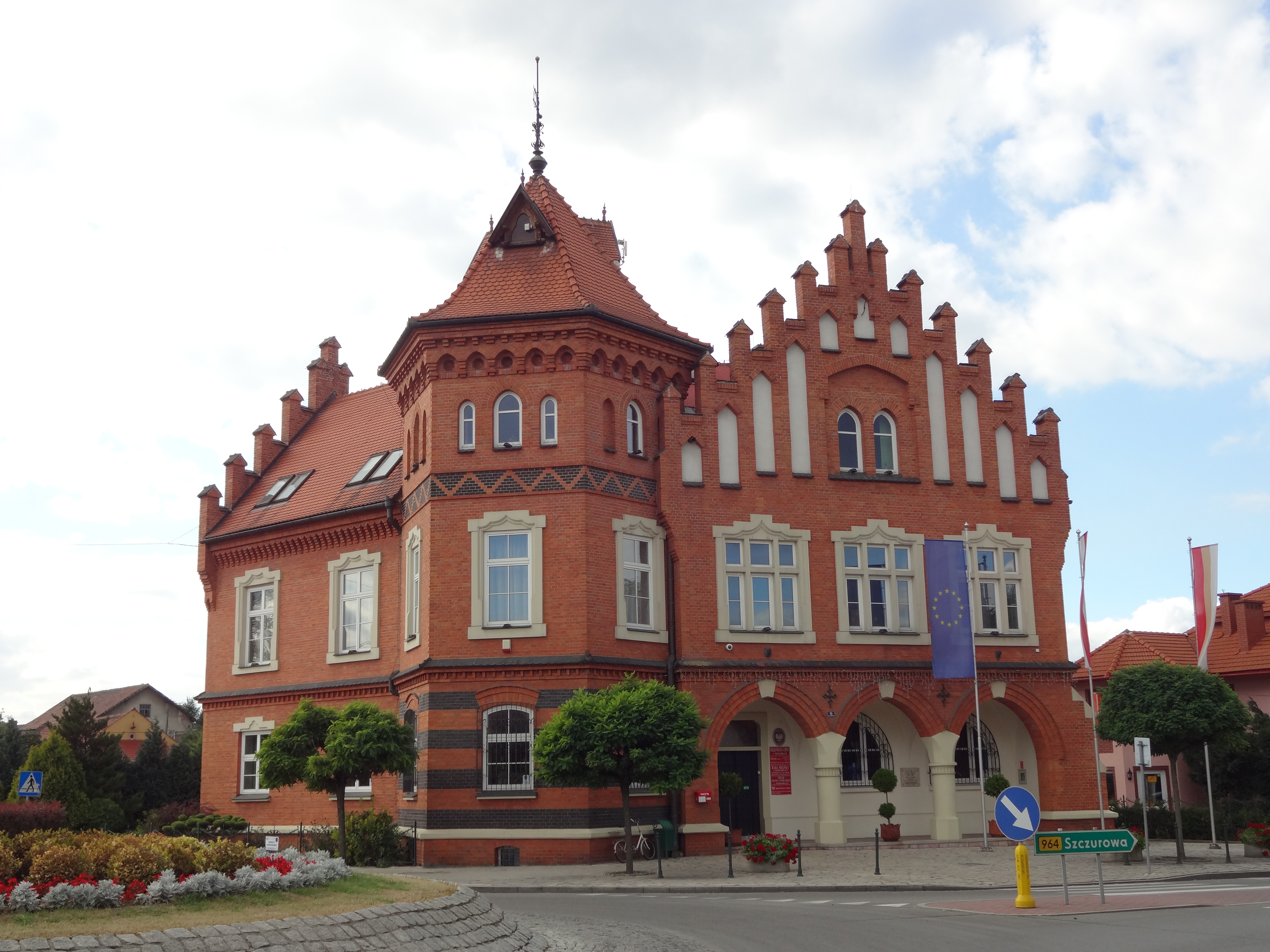
Niepołomice

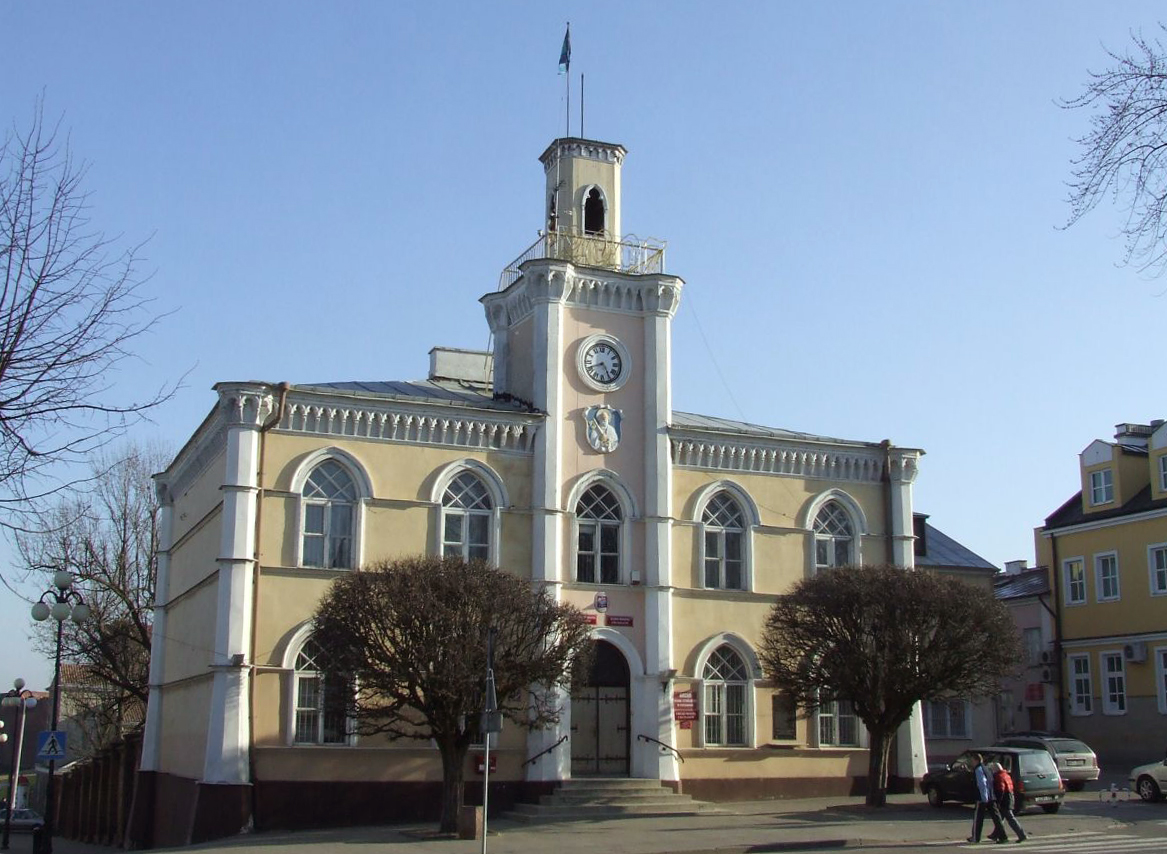
Ciechanów

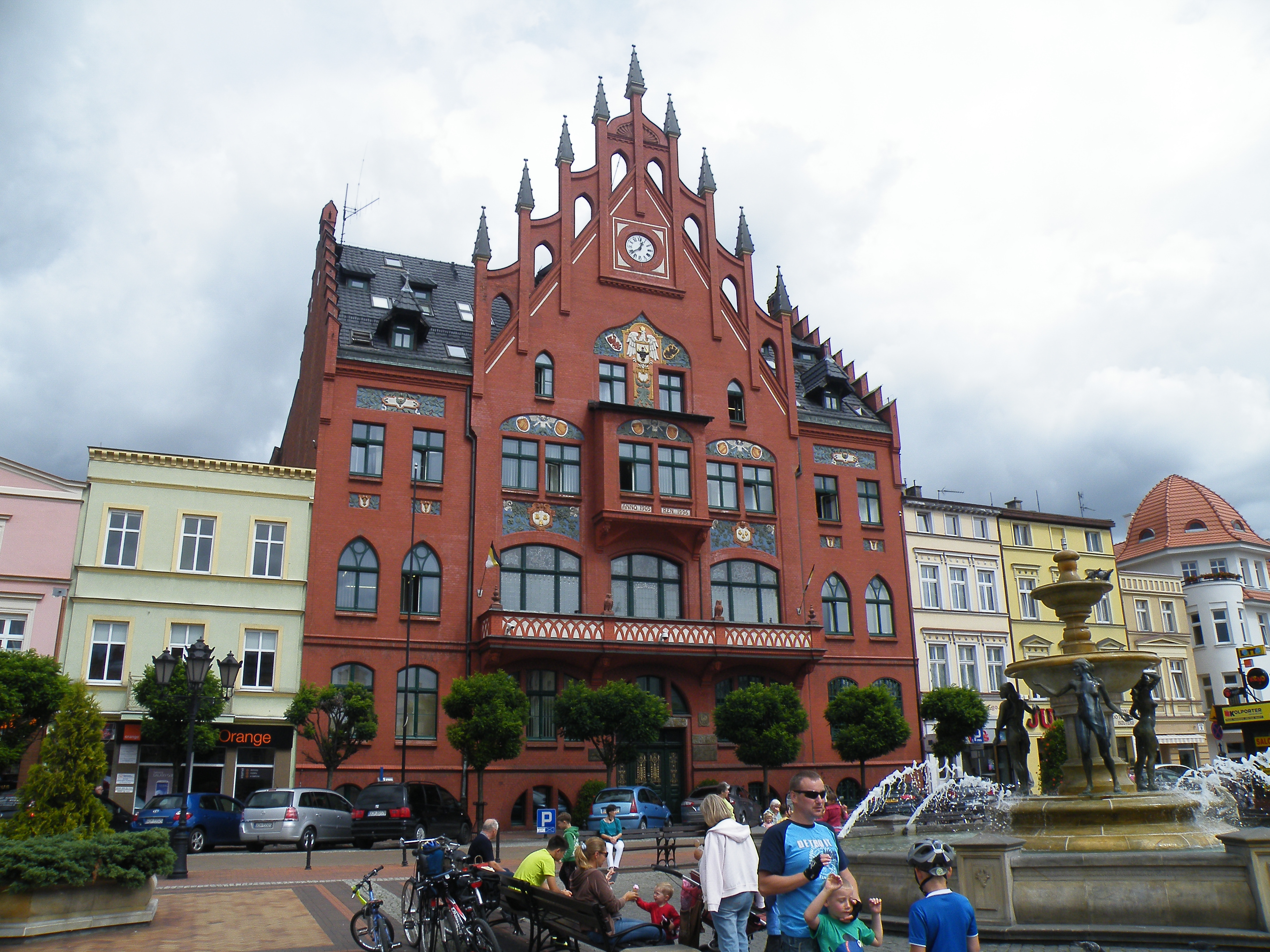
Chojnice

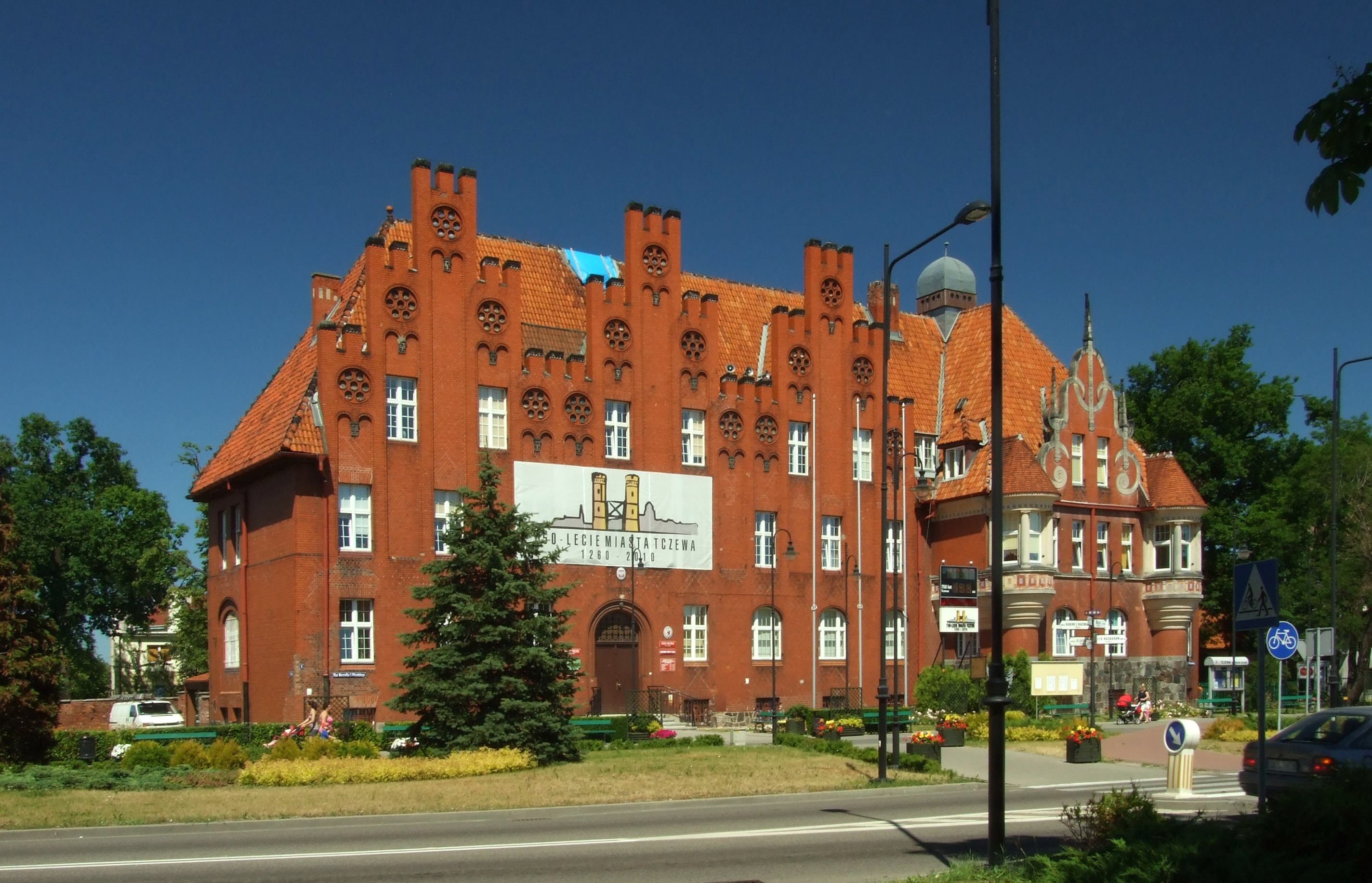
Tczew

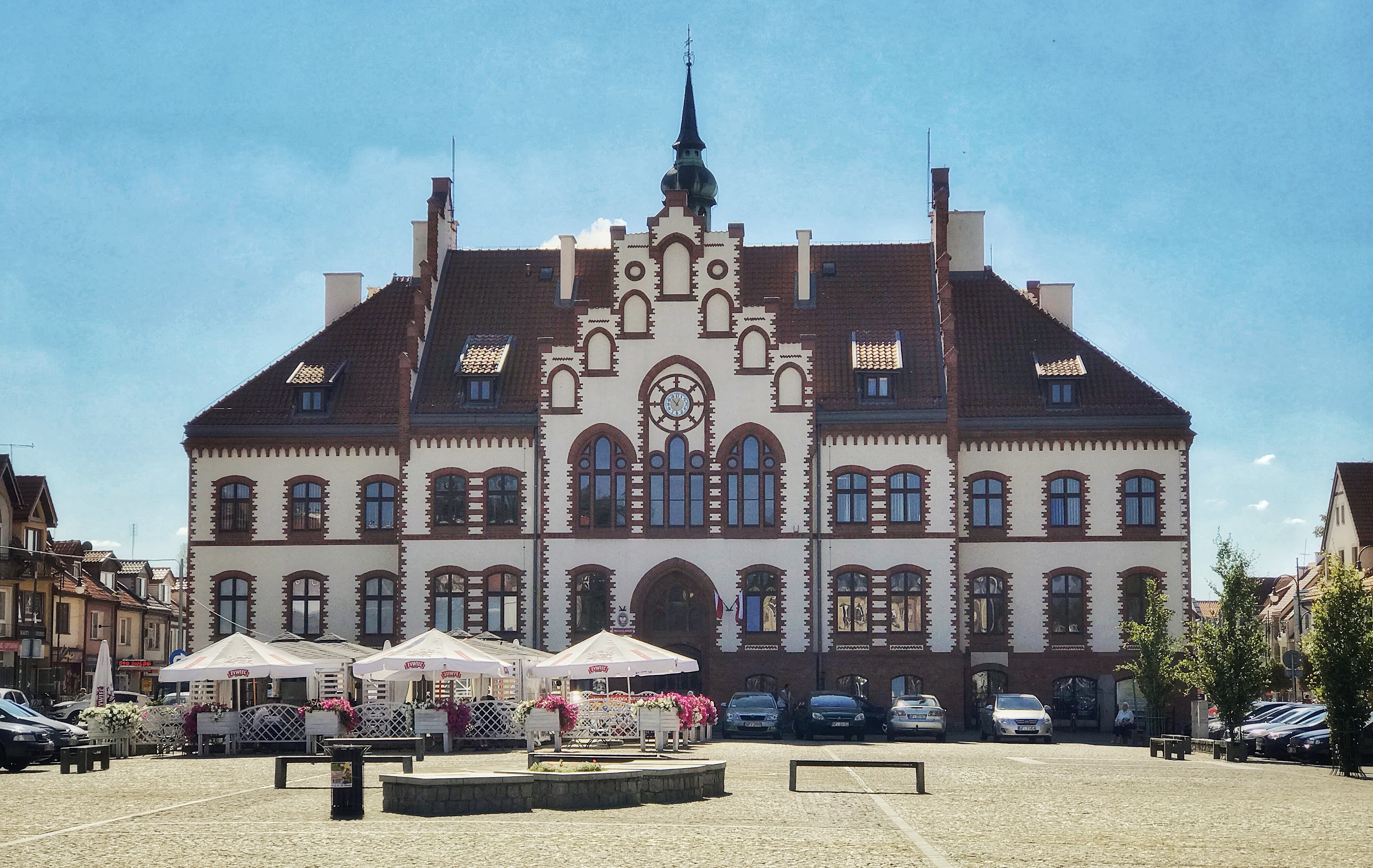
Pisz

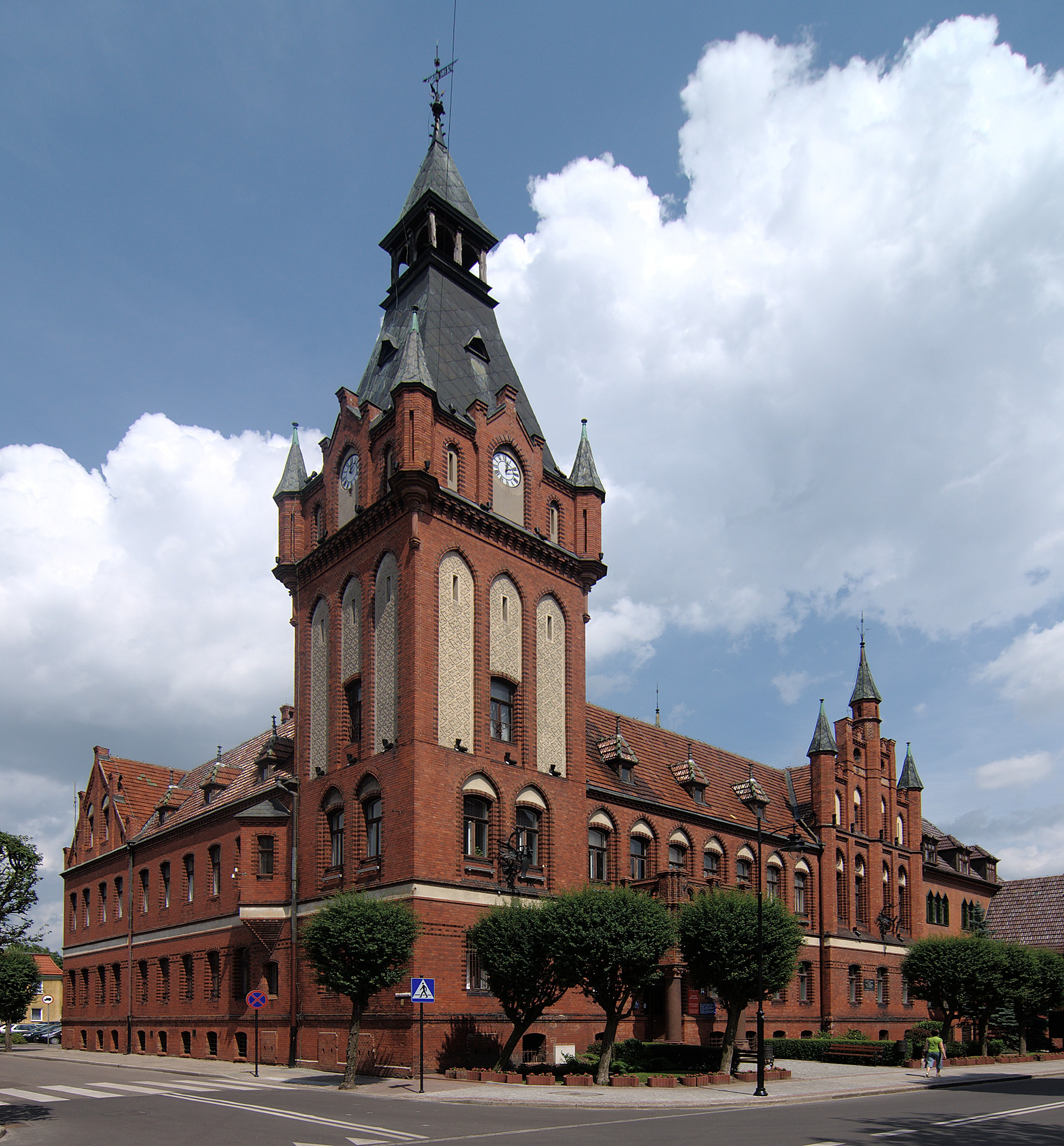
Lębork

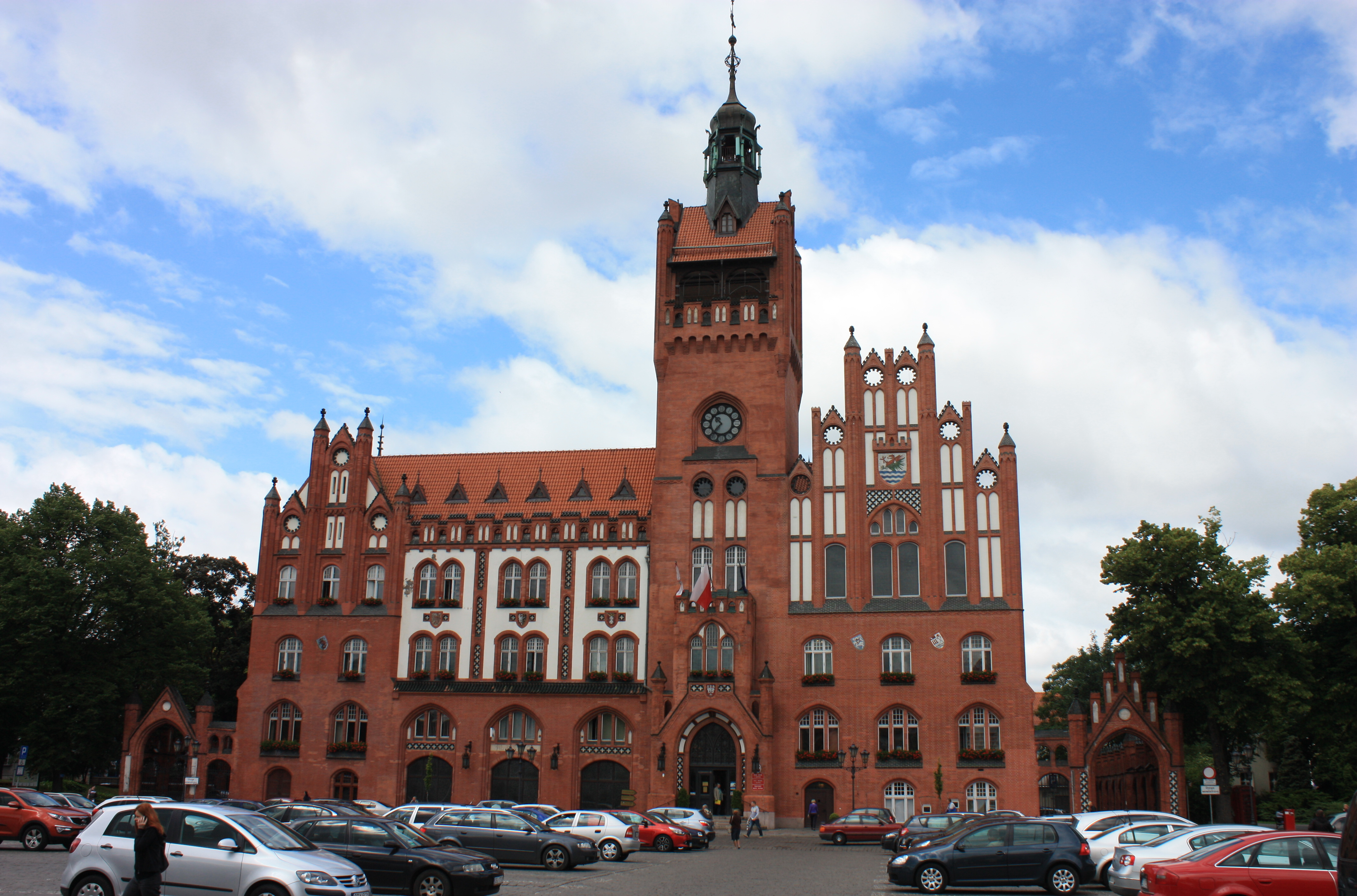
Słupsk

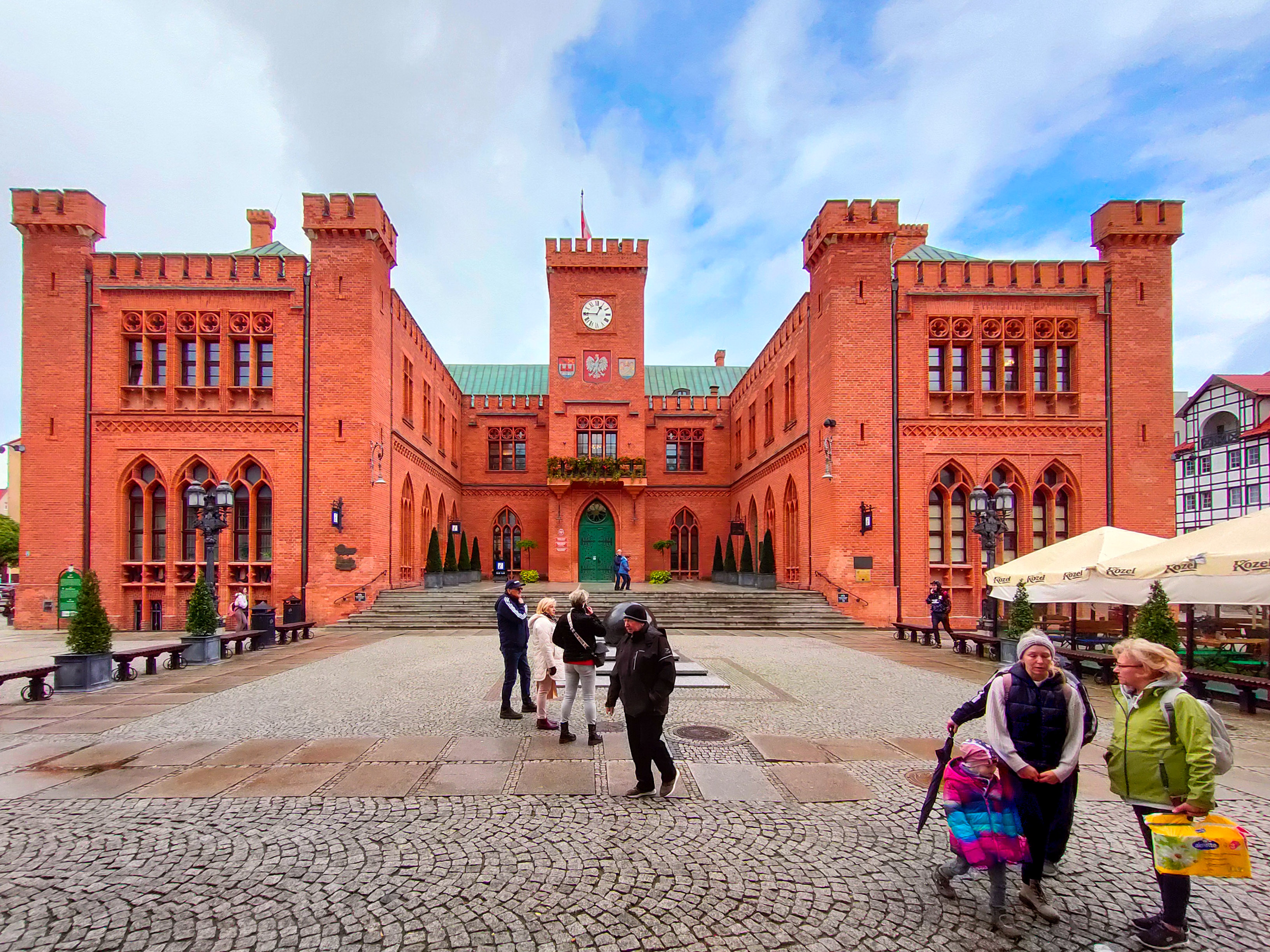
Kołobrzeg
Houses

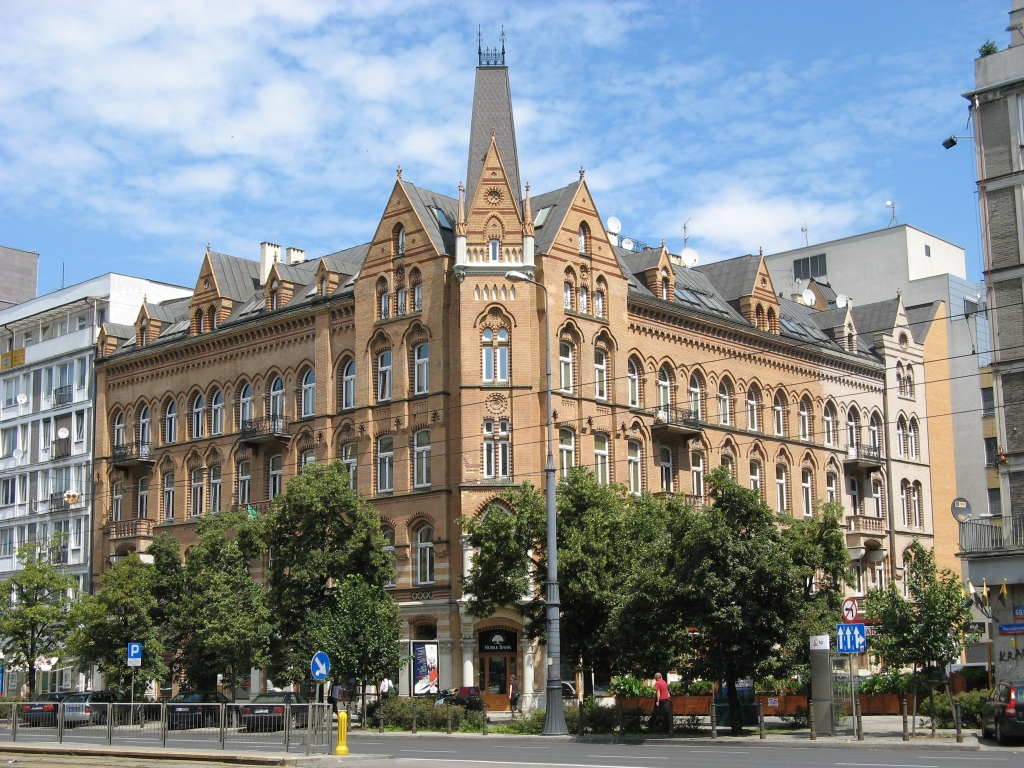
Warsaw

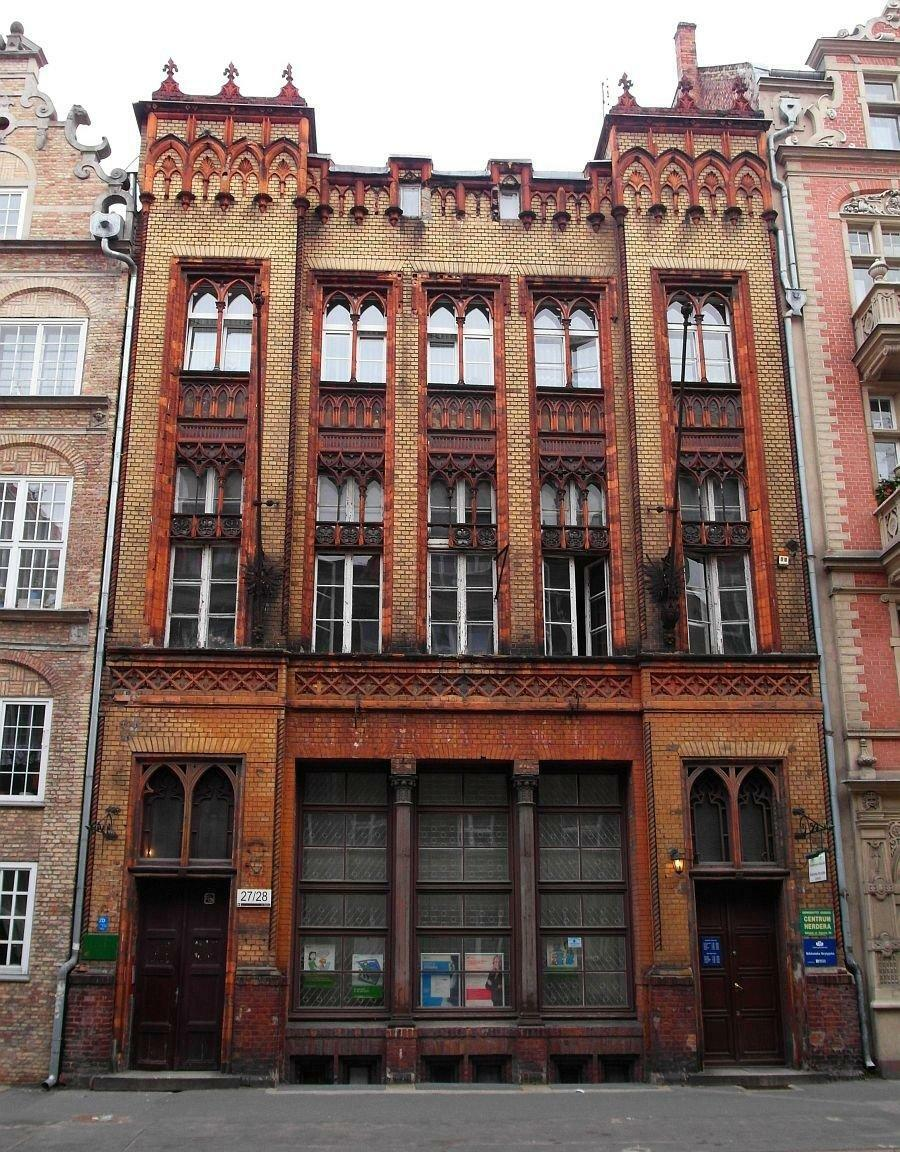
Gdańsk

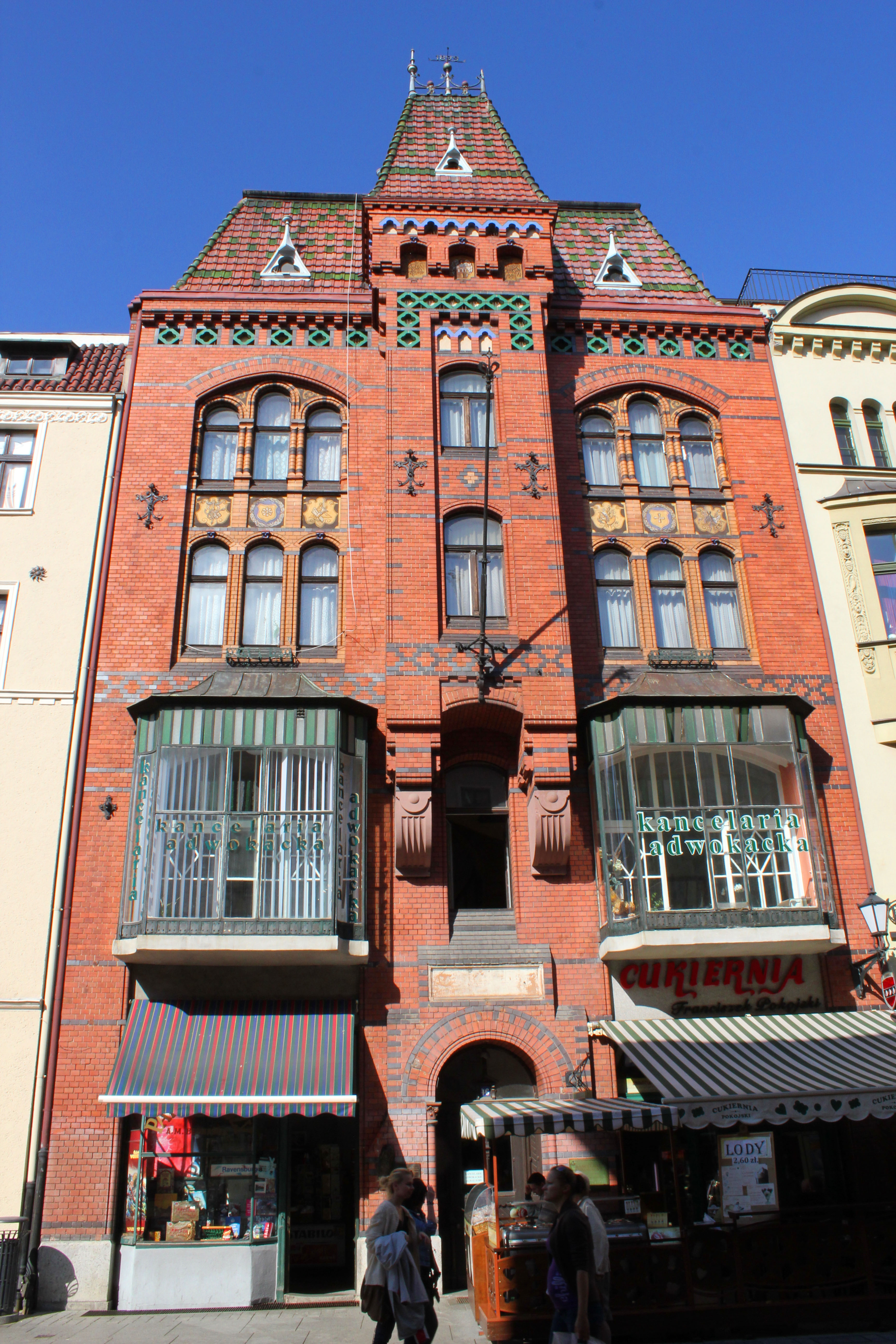
Toruń

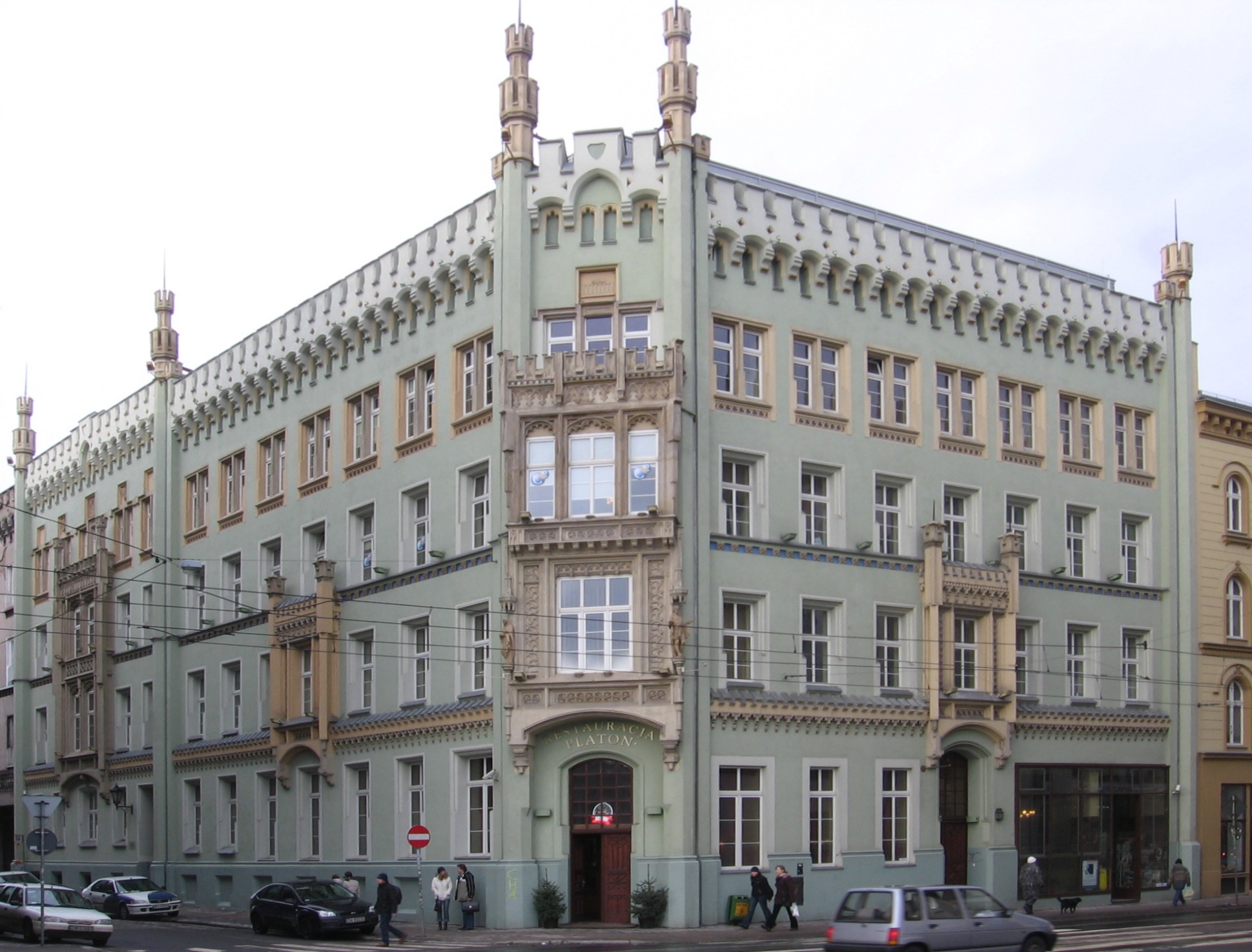
Wrocław

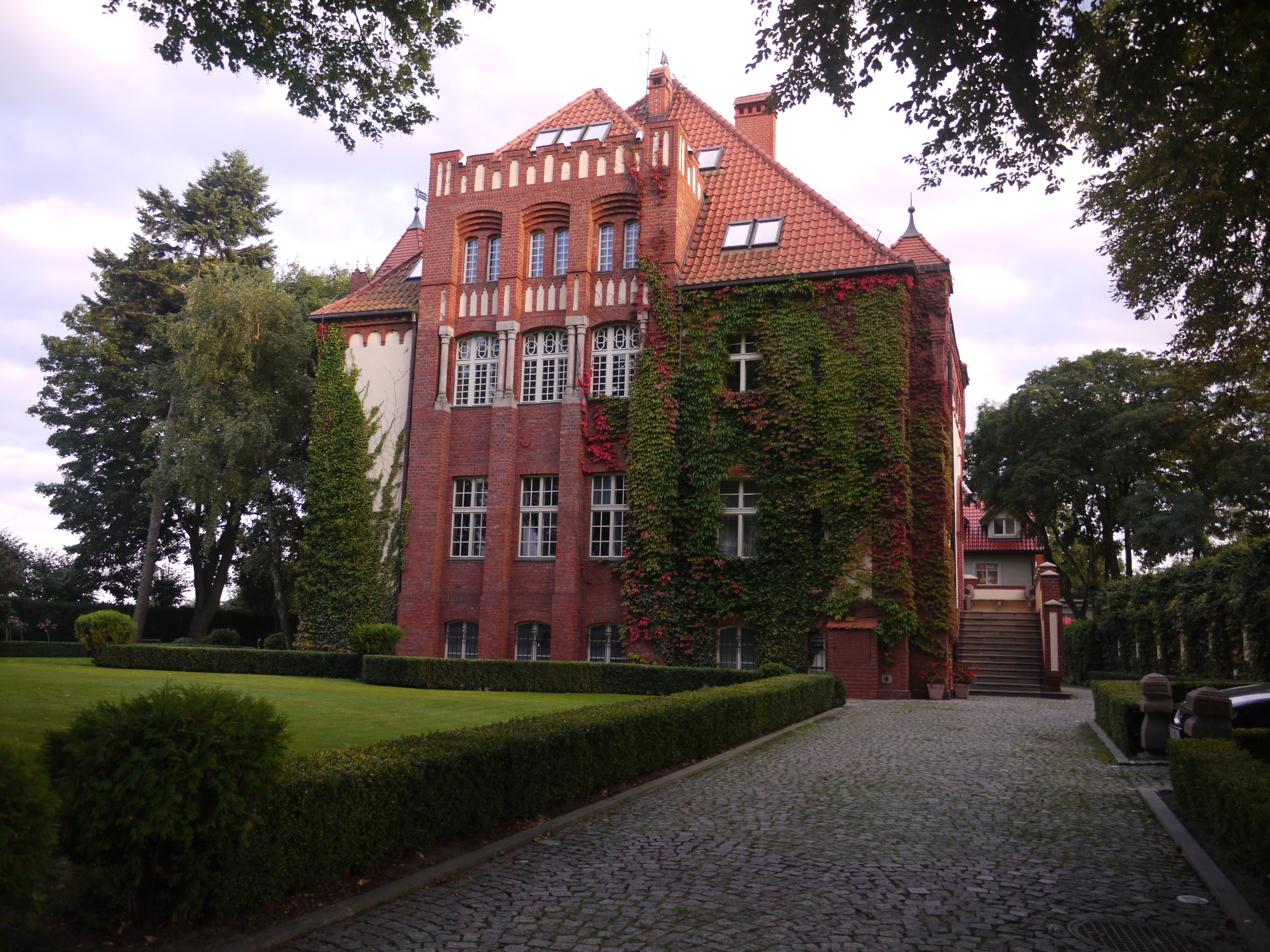
Sopot

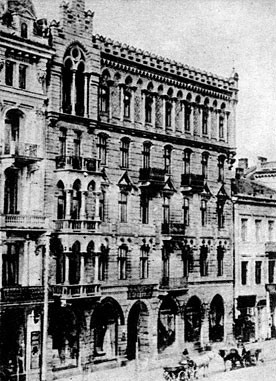
Warsaw
Other buildings

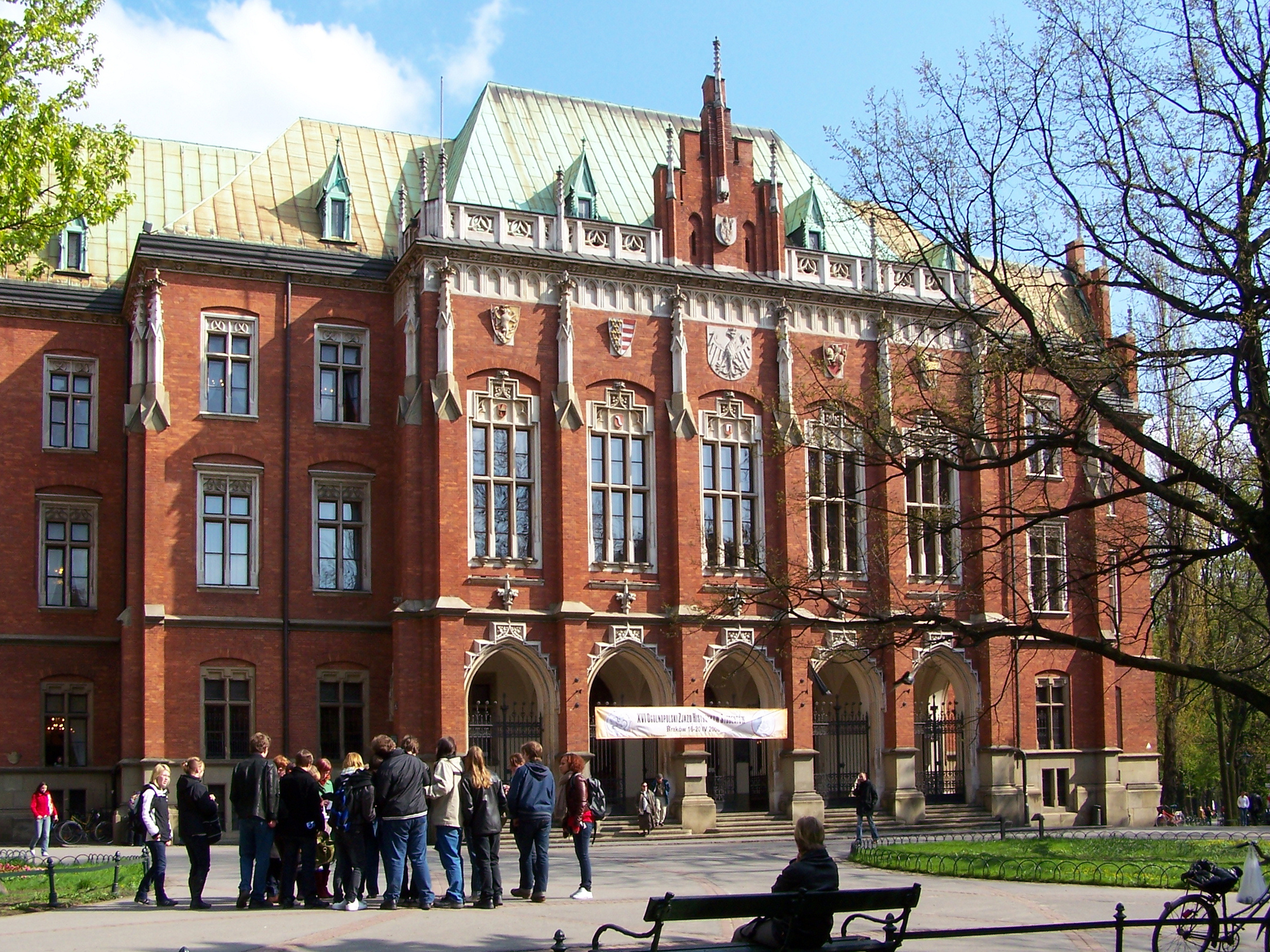
Collegium Novum, Jagiellonian University, Kraków

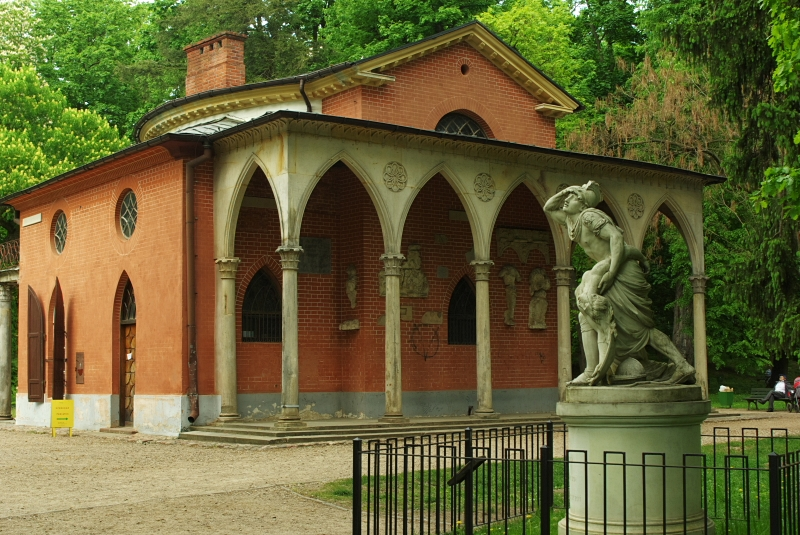
Gothic House, Czartoryski palace complex, Puławy

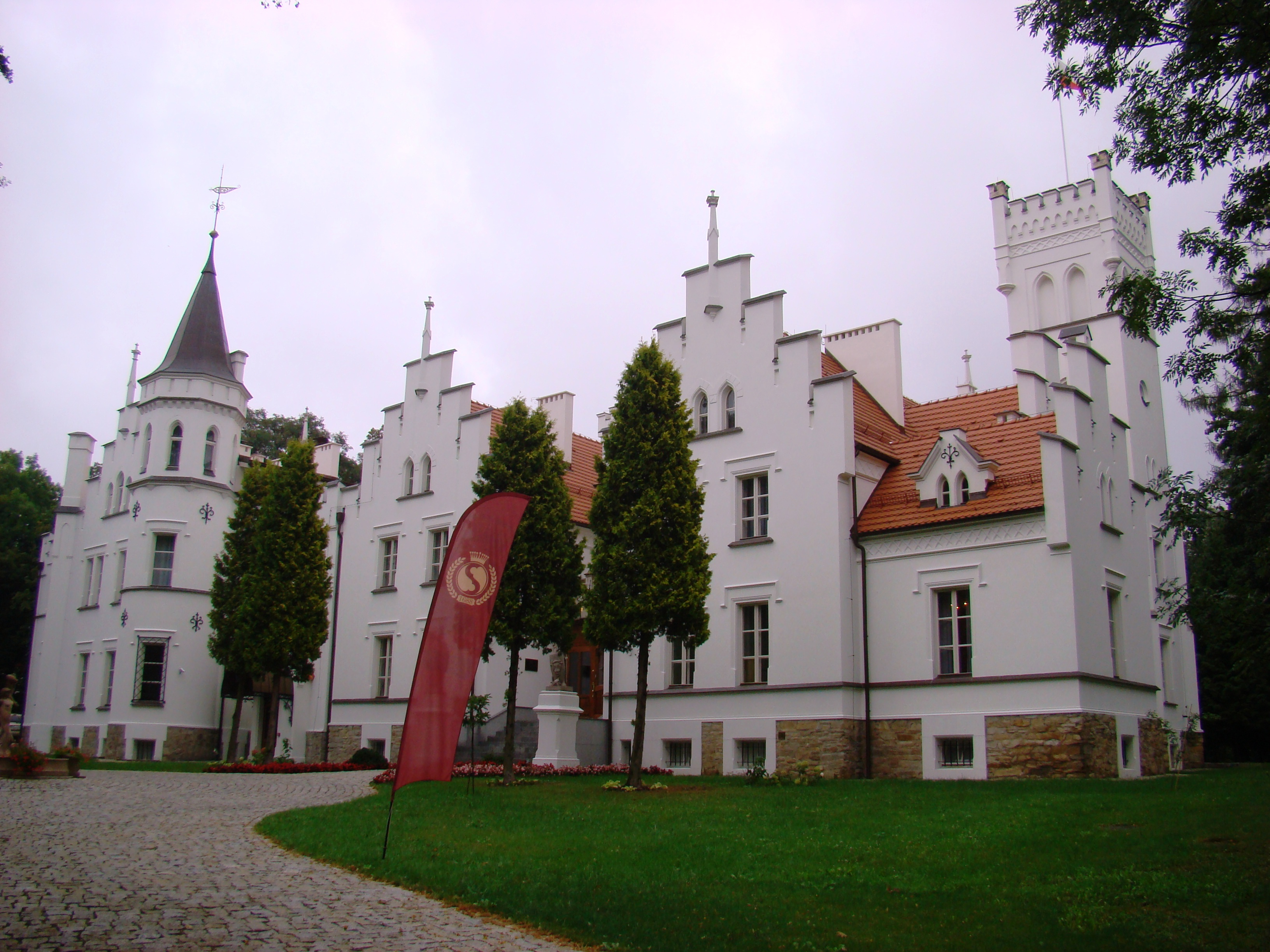
Palace, Sulisław

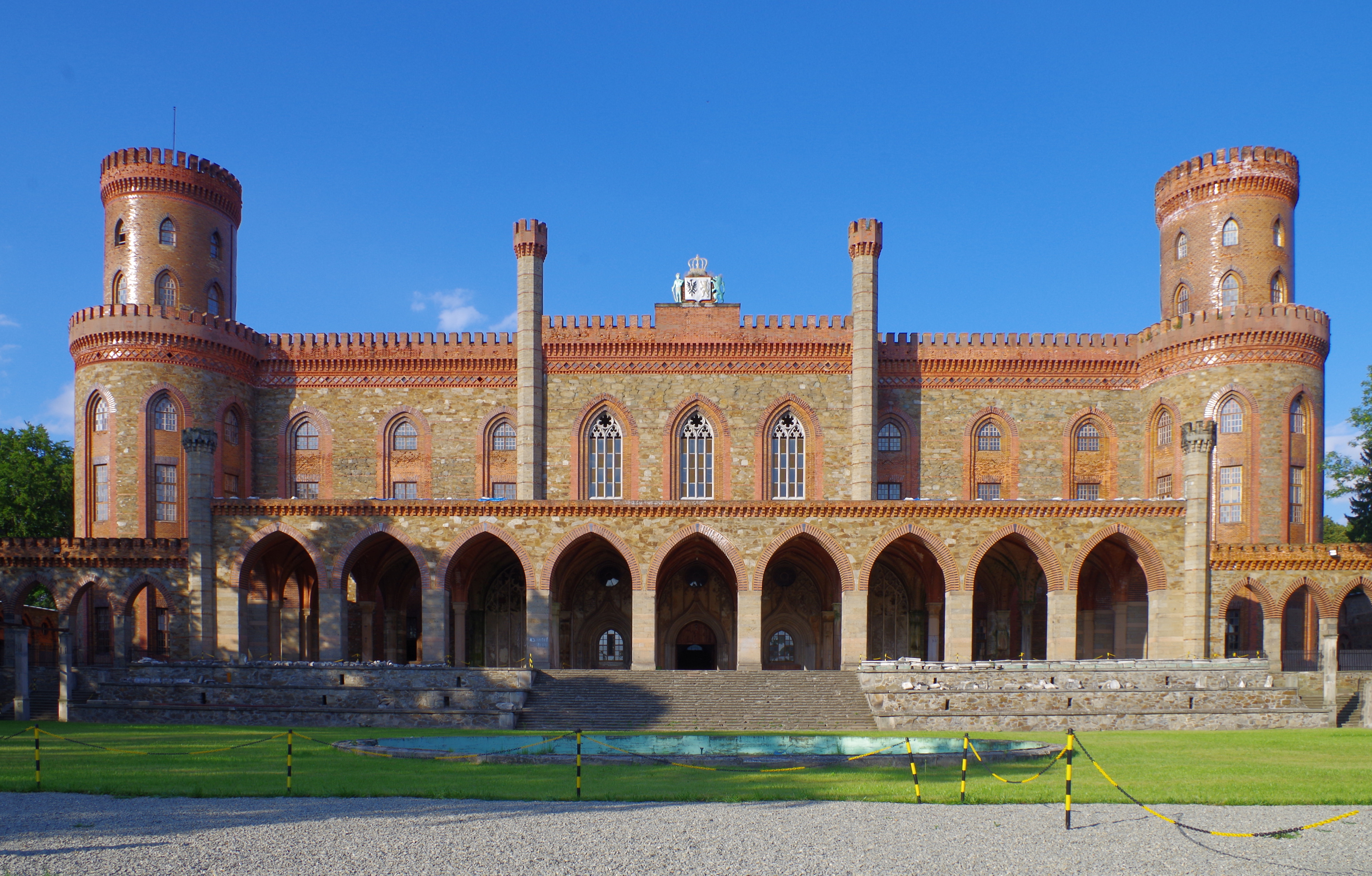
Palace, Kamieniec Ząbkowicki

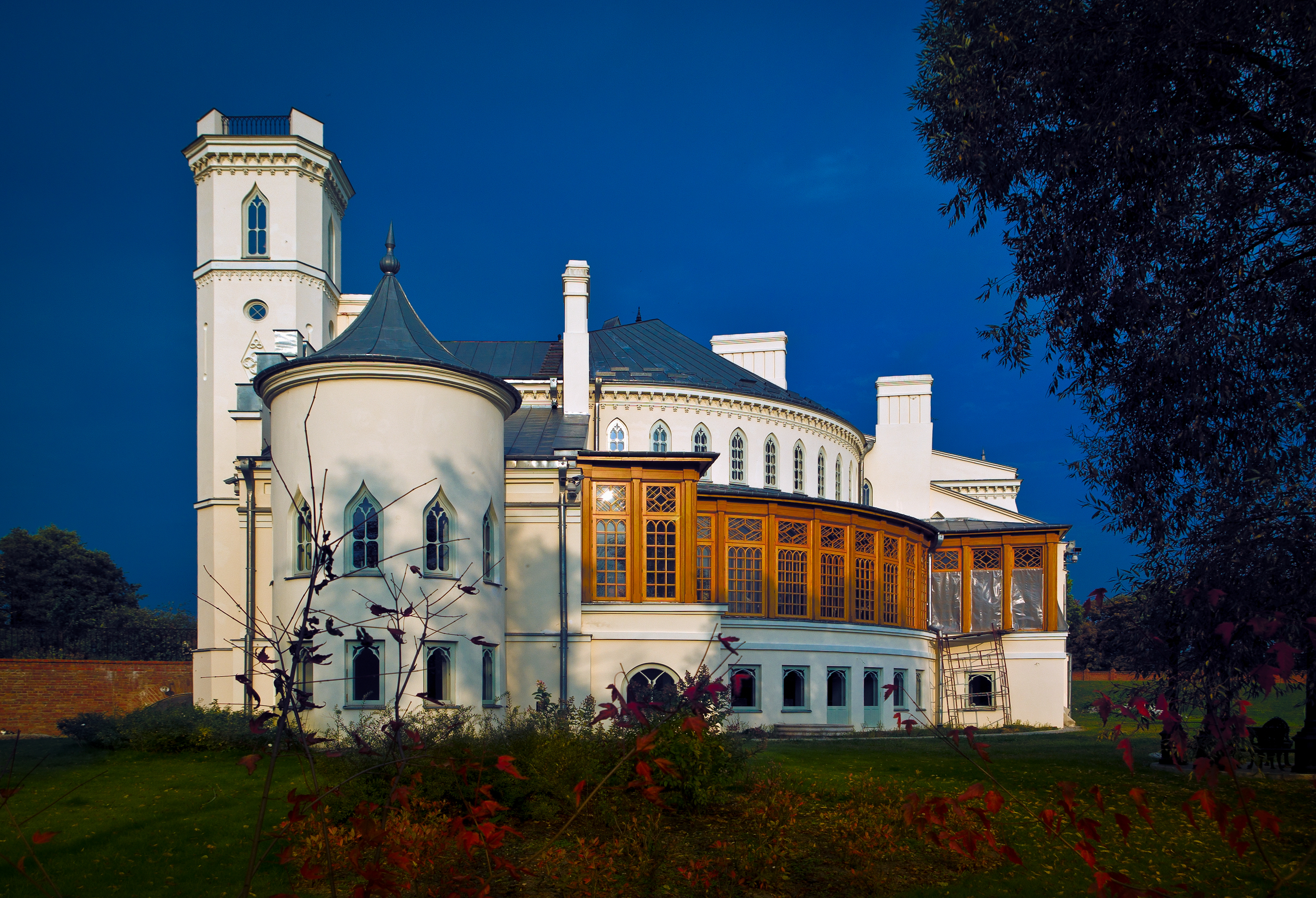
Palace, Patrykozy

== See also ==
- Polish Gothic architecture
