= Bronislava of Poland =

Blessed Bronislava of Poland
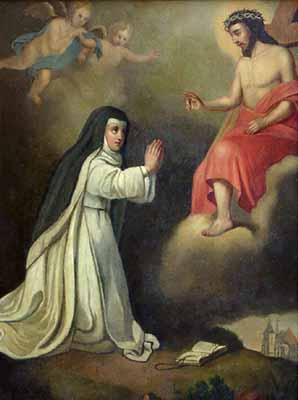
- Błogosławiona Bronisława by Wojciech Eljasz-Radzikowski, 1849
- Born: c. 1204; Kamień, Włodawa County
- Died: 29 August 1259; Zwierzyniec, Kraków
- Venerated in: Roman Catholic Church
- Beatified: 23 August 1839 by Pope Gregory XVI
- Feast: 1 September

Bronislava of Poland (Polish: Bronisława; c. 1204–1259) was a Polish nun of the Premonstratensian Order. She is beatified in the Roman Catholic Church.

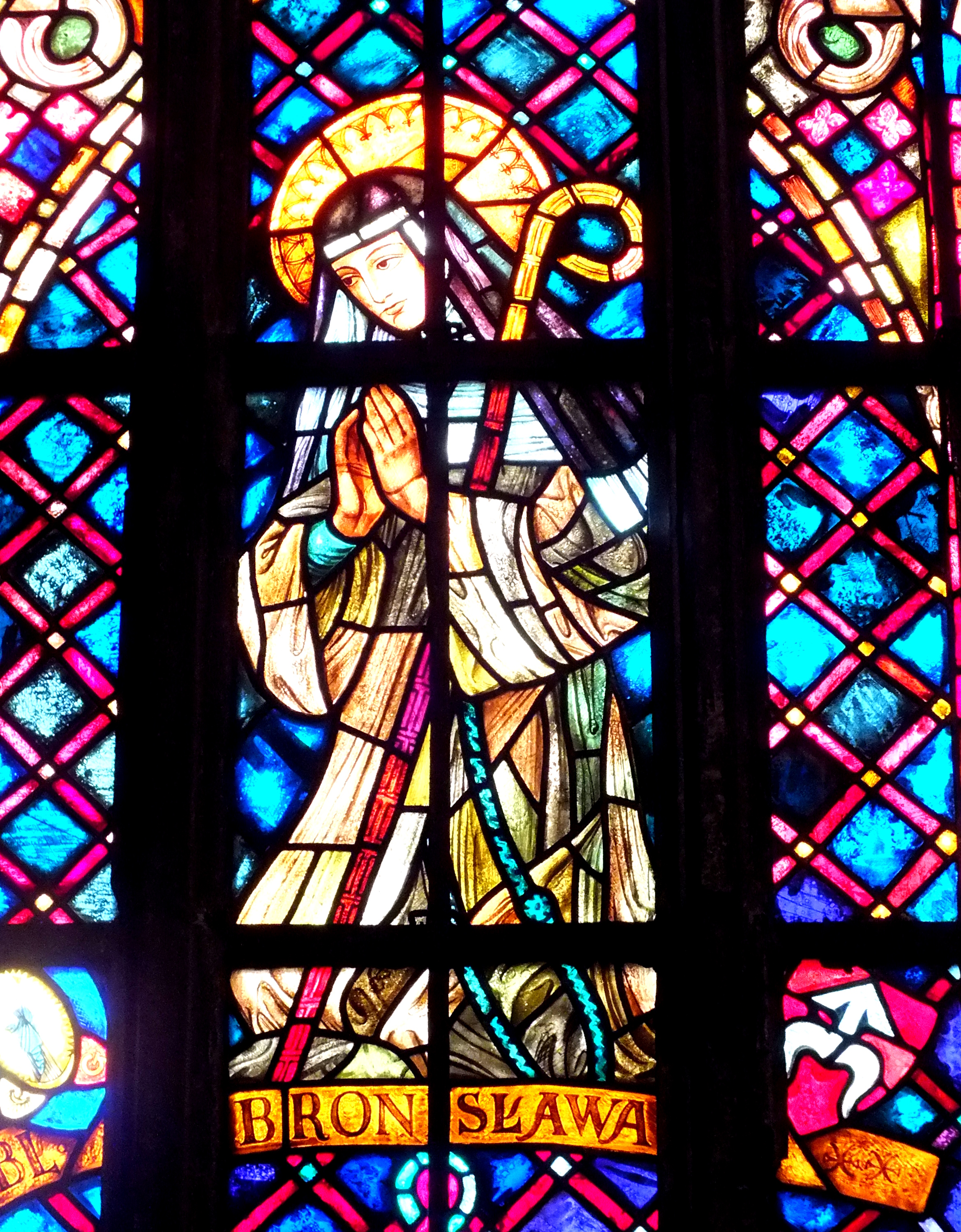
Stained glass blessed Bronislava in cathedral of St. John the Baptist in Wrocław

== Early life ==
Bronislava was born at Kamień, Włodawa County, in eastern Poland as Bronislawa Odrowaz in about 1200, although some sources give a birth date of 1203 or 1204. She was the daughter of Count Stanislaus and Countess Anna of Prandata-Odrowaz and a cousin of Saint Hyacinth of Poland.

== Religious vocation ==
At the age of sixteen, she was introduced by Hyacinth to a religious community of the Norbertine order at Zwierzyniec, Kraków. She subsequently worked with the sick and poor at a number of monasteries, living in a most austere way. She is believed to have seen a vision of the Virgin Mary at the moment of the death of Hyacinth in 1257. Bronislava died of natural causes on 29 August 1259 at Zwierzyniec.

== Beatification and remembrance ==
Her veneration began soon after her death, and in 1707 she was designated a patron of Poland, and of orphans. She was beatified by Pope Gregory XVI on 23 August 1839, after being attributed for protecting Zwierzyniec from cholera in 1835. Her feast day is celebrated on 1 September.

She is commemorated by the Blessed Bronisława Chapel in Kraków. A minor planet discovered in 1933 was named "Bronislawa" in her honour. There is a street named for her in the Ligota-Panewniki region of Katowice.

== See also ==
- List of beatified people
