= Blessed Bronisława Chapel =

Roman Catholic chapel in Kraków, Poland

Coordinates: 50.0542°N 19.8943°E

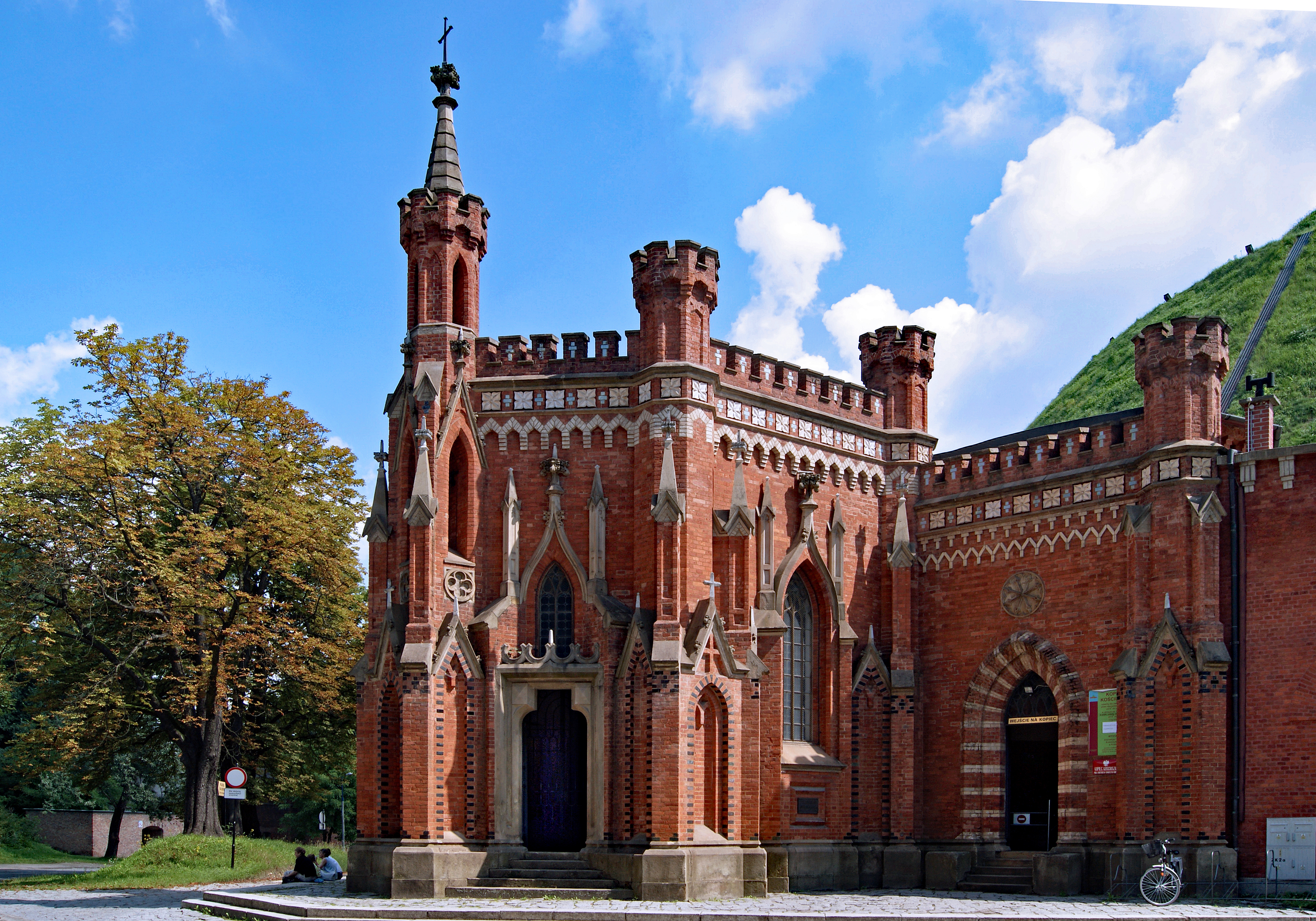
Exterior of the Chapel, at the foot of Kościuszko Mound

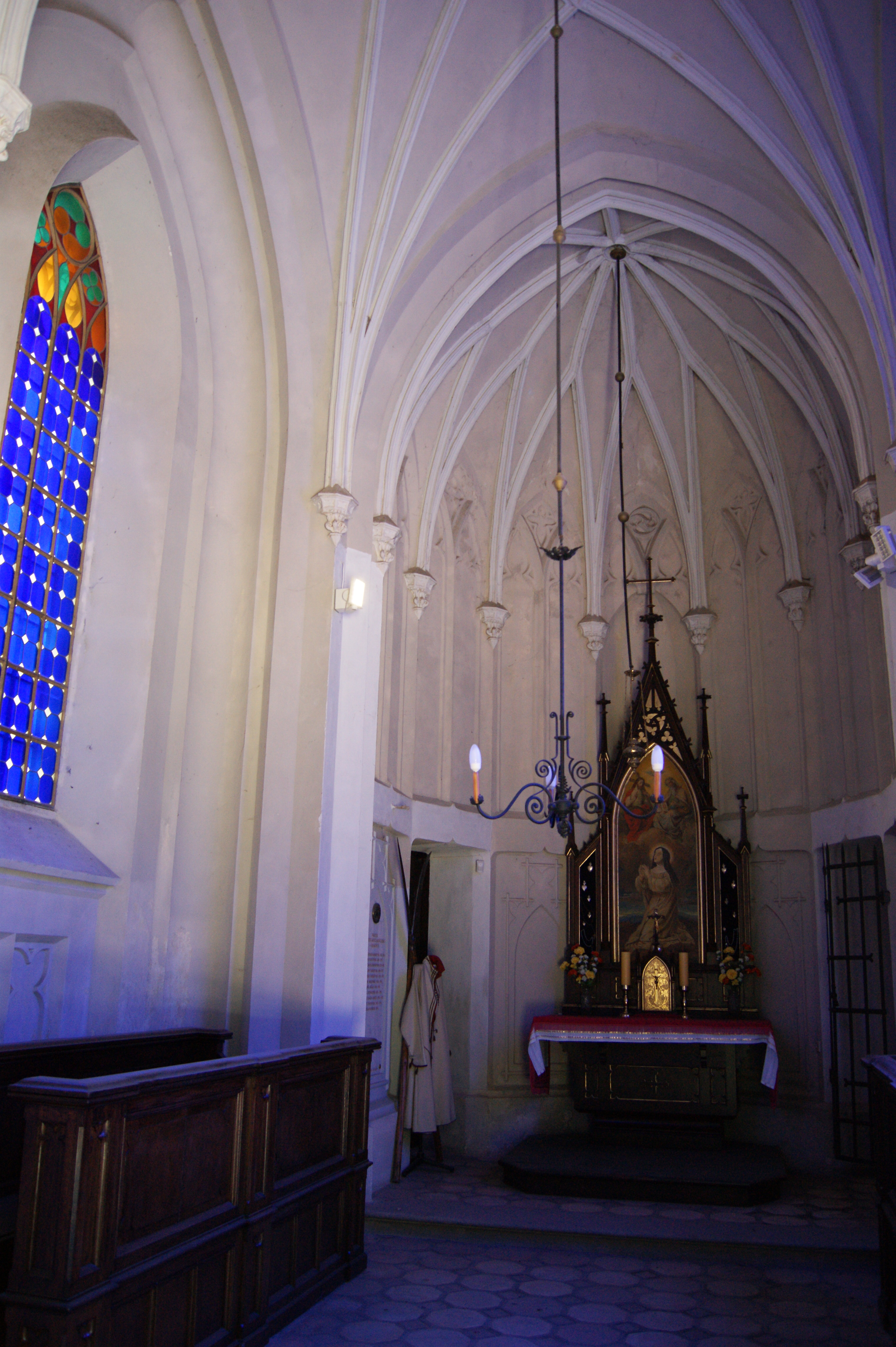
Interior of the Chapel

Chapel of Blessed Bronisława is a neo-Gothic Roman Catholic chapel in Kraków, Poland, erected in 1856–61 within the walls of a military citadel constructed during the Austrian Partition of Poland by the Habsburg monarchy. The chapel was meant as a replacement for the Polish 18th-century church demolished by the Austrians in 1854 during the construction of the stronghold in the Zwierzyniec district.

The imperial "Kościuszko" citadel surrounded the ancient burial mound and Polish national monument called Kościuszko Mound. The actual mound was used as an observation point by the army. The new chapel, based on design by Feliks Księżarski, was a result of the determined requests for a replacement made by the Polish Committee for the Construction of the Tadeusz Kościuszko Monument.

== Background ==
The chapel of Blessed Bronisława took its name from the 13th Century Norbertine nun, who had left the convent in order to lead a hermit's life in that exact place. Her abode still existed by the hill (known as Sikornik) in the 19th century, though already adorned by the shrine erected at the beginning of the 18th century. Norbertine Sisters from the Zwierzyniec convent donated the grounds on which the Mound and the chapel were erected.

== See also ==
- Churches of Kraków
