= Kamień, Włodawa County =

Kamień
- Village
- Location within Poland
- Coordinates: 51°31′N 23°16′E
- Country: Poland
- Voivodeship: Lublin
- County: Włodawa
- Gmina: Stary Brus

Kamień (Polish pronunciation: [ˈkamjɛj̃]) is a village in the administrative district of Gmina Stary Brus, within Włodawa County, Lublin Voivodeship, in eastern Poland.
