= Pelayo =

Pelayo is the Spanish form of the Latin name Pelagius. It may refer to:

- Pelagius of Asturias, founder of the Kingdom of Asturias and beginner of the Reconquista
- Pelagius of Córdoba, tenth-century Christian martyr
- Pelagius of Oviedo, bishop and chronicler
- Spanish ship Pelayo, more than one ship of the Spanish Navy
- Ermita de San Pelayo y San Isidoro, a Romanesque hermitage that formerly was in Ávila, and whose ruins are now located in Madrid
- Pelayo, a synonym for the genus of South American spiders Josa

== See also ==
- Pelayo Rodríguez (disambiguation)
- Pelagio (disambiguation)
- Pelagius (disambiguation)
