= Hermitage (religious retreat) =

Place of seclusion

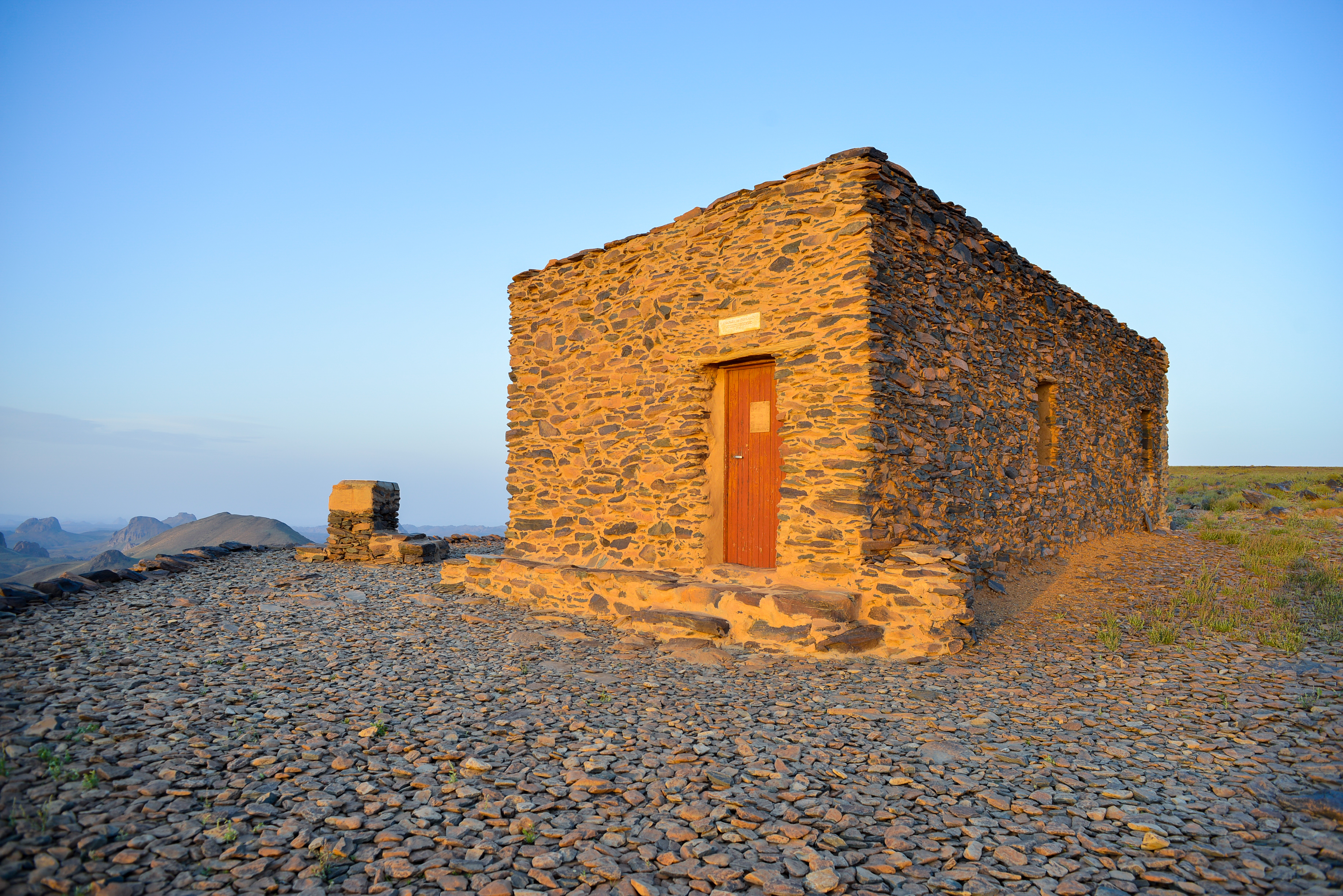
Hermitage used by Charles de Foucauld in the Hoggar (Algeria)

A hermitage is a place where a hermit lives in seclusion from the world, or a building or settlement where a person or a group of people live religiously, in seclusion. Particularly, as a name or part of the name of properties its meaning is often imprecise, harking to a distant period of local history, components of the building material, or recalling any former sanctuary or holy place. Secondary churches or establishments run from a monastery were often called "hermitages".

In the 18th century, some owners of English country houses adorned their gardens with a "hermitage", sometimes a Gothic ruin, but sometimes, as at Painshill Park, a romantic hut which a "hermit" was recruited to occupy. The so-called Ermita de San Pelayo y San Isidoro is the ruins of a Romanesque church of Ávila, Spain, that ended up several hundred miles away, to feature in the Buen Retiro Park in Madrid.

== Western Christian tradition ==
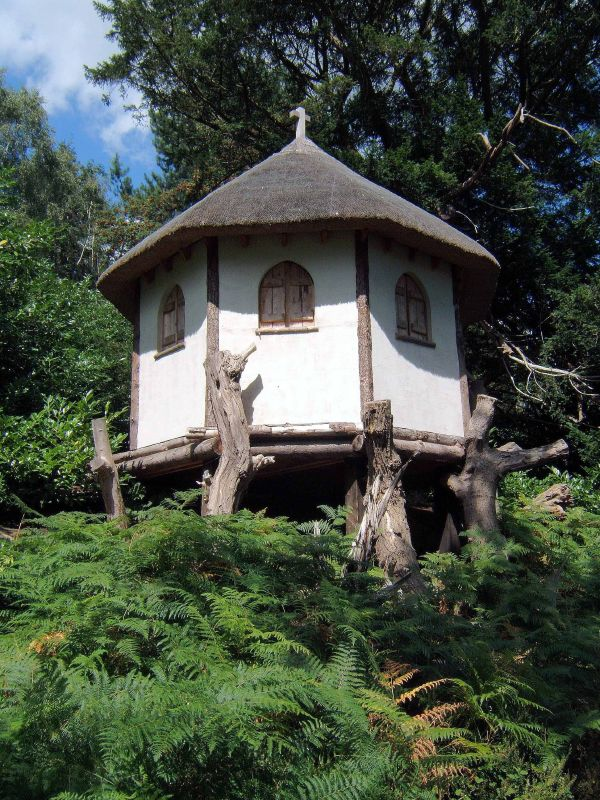
A hermitage at Painshill Park

A hermitage is any type of domestic dwelling in which a hermit lives. While the level of isolation can vary widely, more often than not it is associated with a nearby monastery. Typically, hermitages consist of at least one detached room, or sometimes a dedicated space within an open floor plan building, for religious devotion, basic sleeping accommodations, and a domestic cooking range, suitable for the ascetic lifestyle of the inhabitant. Depending on the work of the hermit, premises such as a studio, workshop or chapel may be attached or sited in proximity.

Originally, the first hermitages were natural caves, temple ruins, and even simple huts in forests and deserts. Around the time of early fourth century (around 300 AD), the spiritual retreats of the Desert Fathers, who had chosen to live apart from society in the relative isolation of the Nitrian Desert of Egypt, began to attract the attention of the wider Christian community. The piety of such hermits often attracted both laity and other would-be ascetics, forming the first cenobitic communities called "sketes", such as Nitria and Kellia. Within a short time, more and more people arrived to adopt the teachings and lifestyle of these hermits, and there began by necessity a mutual exchange of labour and shared goods between them, forming the first monastic communities.

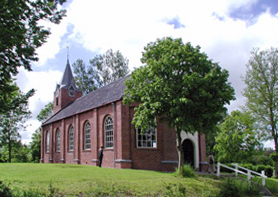
Hermitage "Our Lady of the Enclosed Garden" in Warfhuizen, the Netherlands

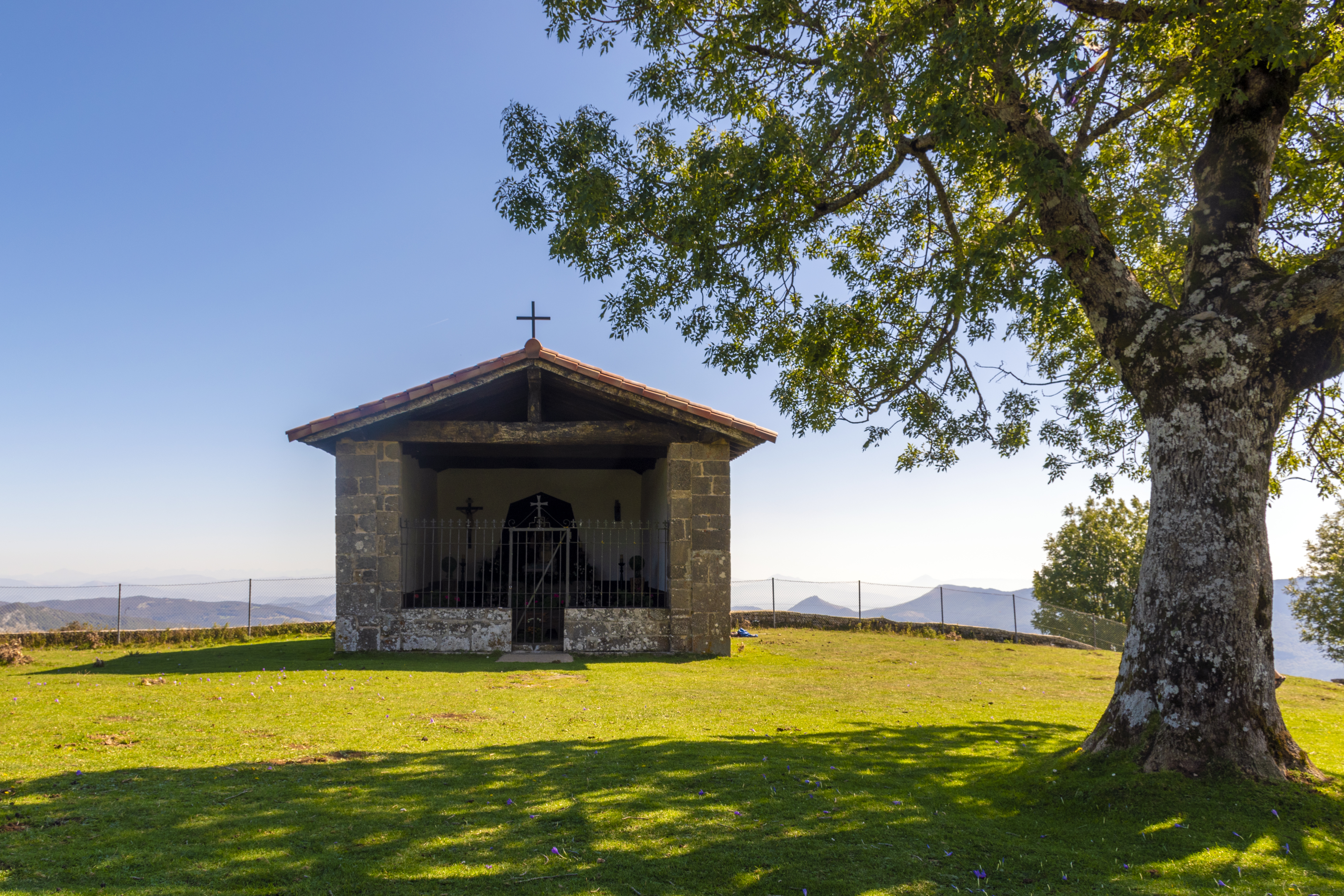
Trinity hermitage at San Miguel de Aralar, Uharte-Arakil, Navarre

In the later feudal period of the Middle Ages, both monasteries and hermitages alike were endowed by royalty and nobility in return for prayers being said for their family, believing it to be beneficial to the state of their soul.

Carthusian monks typically live in a one-room cell or building, with areas for study, sleep, prayer, and preparation of meals. Most Carthusians live a mostly solitary life, meeting with their brethren for communion, for shared meals on holy days, and again irregularly for nature walks, where they are encouraged to have simple discussions about their spiritual life.

In the modern era, hermitages are often abutted to monasteries, or in their grounds, being occupied by monks who receive dispensation from their abbot or prior to live a semi-solitary life. However, hermitages can be found in a variety of settings, from isolated rural sites, houses in large cities, and even high-rise blocks of flats, depending on the hermit's means.

Examples of hermitages in Western Christian tradition:

1. The Grande Chartreuse in Saint-Pierre-de-Chartreuse, France, motherhouse of the Carthusian Order.
2. New Camaldoli Hermitage in Big Sur, California, United States
3. Camaldolese Hermitage in Bielany, Kraków, Poland
4. Hermitage of Santa María de Lara, a Visigothic building in northern Spain, probably built as a normal church, it later passed to a monastery before being abandoned.
5. Alsike Convent, an Evangelical Lutheran convent in Sweden belonging to the Sisters of the Holy Spirit, has two hermitages that are located at a distance from the monastic village.

== Eastern Christian tradition ==
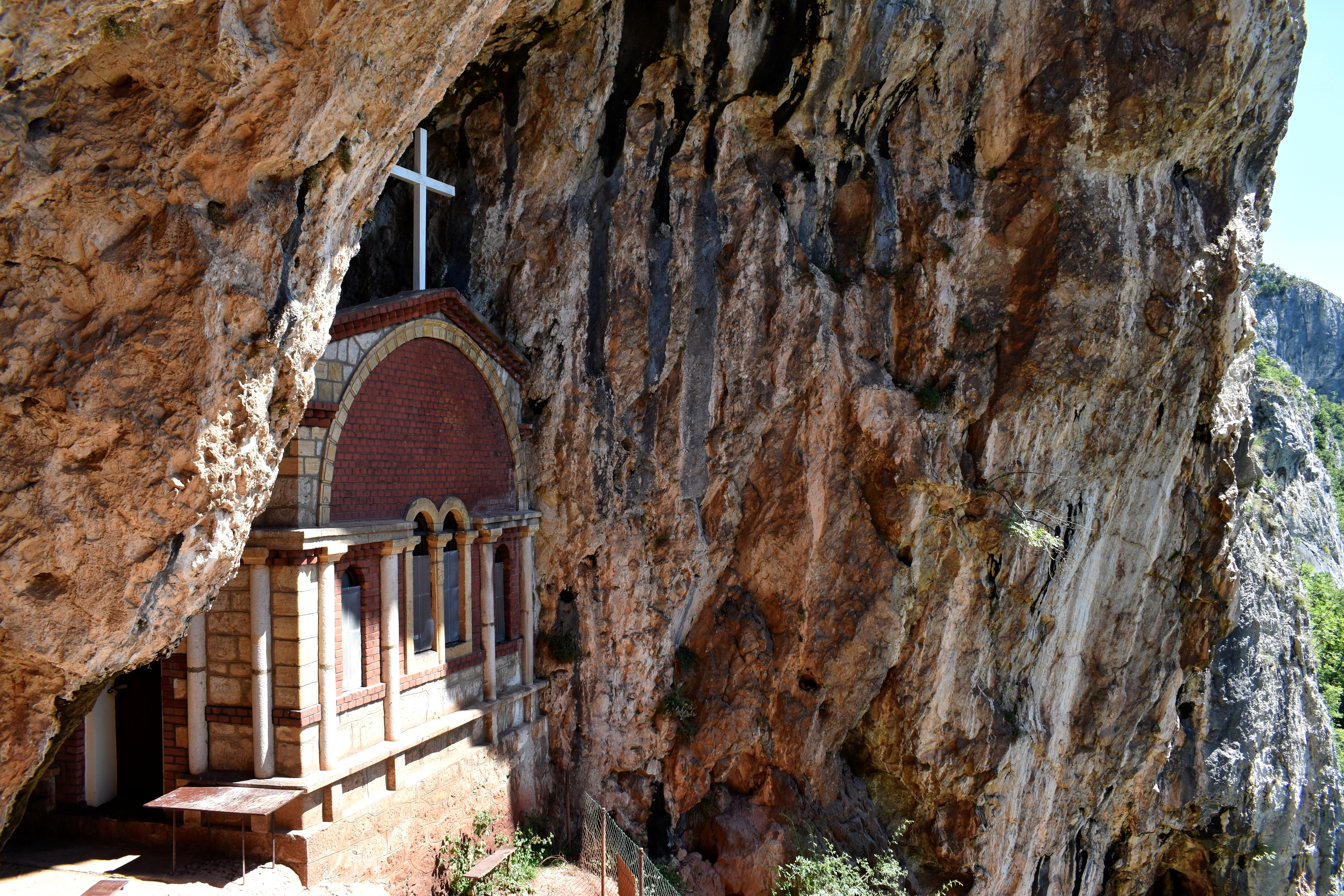
Hermitage of Saint Sava in the Ovčar-Kablar Gorge, Serbia

A pustyn (Russian: пустынь) or kalyva (Greek: καλύβα) or anapat' (Armenian: անապատ) is a small sparsely furnished cabin or room where a person goes to pray and fast alone in the presence of God. The word poustyn has its origin in the Russian word for desert (пустыня). A person called to live permanently in a poustinia is called a poustinik (plural: poustiniki) or anapatakan (Armenian: անապատական).

A poustinik is one who has been called by God to live life in the desert (poustinia), alone with God in the service of humanity through prayer, fasting, and availability to those who might call upon him or her. Those called to life in the poustinia were not uncommon in Russia prior to the suppression of Christianity in the early 20th century.

In this Eastern Christian expression of the eremitic vocation, poustiniks are not solitary but are part of the local community to which they are called. The poustinik is a servant of God and God's people, in communion with the Church. Historically, one who experienced the call

"...to the poustinia had first, after securing the blessing of his or her spiritual director, to find a village. He generally did this through pilgrimage and prayer. Once having discovered the village to which he felt God drawing him, the poustinik went to the elders and asked permission to live there as a poustinik. Permission was happily given, as Russians were glad to have a poustinik praying for them.

The poustinik lives alone praying for his own salvation, the salvation of the world, and particularly for the community that God has blessed for him to be a member. Traditionally:

The poustinik was also available to the people. When there were special needs, such as a fire to fight or hay to bring in, the poustinik would help. And whenever anyone had something they wanted to talk about—a question about prayer, a problem, a special joy or sorrow—they could go to the poustinik.

The poustinik is one who listens, and shares the love of Christ with all whom he encounters, as well as a cup of tea or some food; whatever he has he shares, as God has shared all with him.

=== Catherine Doherty ===
The poustinia was documented by the Catholic social activist Catherine Doherty in her best-selling book Poustinia: Christian Spirituality of the East for Western Man first published in 1975.

Although originating with ancient startsy (wise Russian elders, sg. starets), Doherty's popular book made the concept of poustinia accessible to modern Western people. In it, she describes the poustinia as "an entry into the desert, a lonely place, a silent place, where one can lift the two arms of prayer and penance to God in atonement, intercession, reparation for one's sins and those of one's brothers.... To go into the poustinia means to listen to God. It means entering into kenosis — the emptying of oneself." She promotes the poustinia as a place where anyone — in any walk of life — can go for 24 hours of silence, solitude and prayer. Ultimately, however, the poustinik's call is to the desert of one's own heart wherein he dwells with God alone, whether in the workplace or in a solitary locale.

A poustinia cabin or room generally consists of a bed, a table and chair, a cross, and a Bible.

== Other traditions ==
=== Ashram ===
In Hinduism, a hermitage is called an ashram. Traditionally, an ashram in ancient India was a place where sages lived in peace and tranquility amidst nature.

== See also ==
- Anchorite cell, where a vow of stability has been taken.
- Example of hermitage at Optina Pustyn (Optina Monastery).
- Khalwati order, the people of the khalwa, those who practice seclusion and solitude.
- Monastic cell
- Skete
- Tatevi Anapat
