= Kraków Zoo =

Kraków Zoological Garden Ogród Zoologiczny w Krakowie

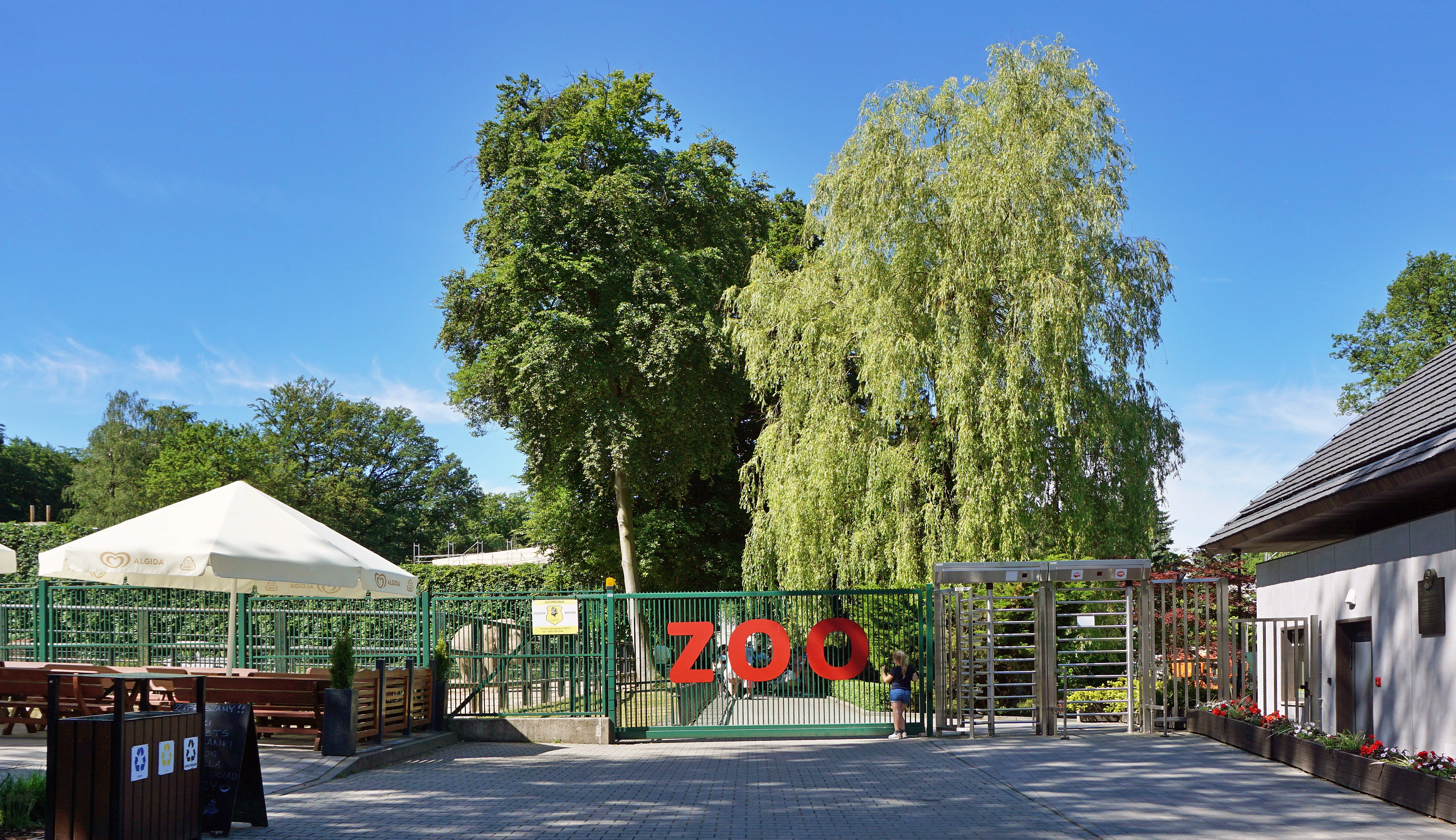
- Gate at the Zoo
- Interactive map of Kraków Zoological Garden; Ogród Zoologiczny w Krakowie
- 50°03′13″N 19°51′02″E
- Date opened: 1929
- Location: Kraków, Poland
- Land area: 16.76 hectares (41.4 acres)
- No. of animals: 1500
- No. of species: 260
- Annual visitors: 540,000 (2022)
- Memberships: EAZA, WAZA
- Director: Teresa Grega
- Website: www.zoo-krakow.pl/index_en.php

The Kraków Zoo (Polish: Ogród Zoologiczny w Krakowie) is located in Kraków, Poland and was established in 1929. It is home to over 1500 animals and about 260 species. The zoo is a member of the European Association of Zoos and Aquaria and the World Association of Zoos and Aquariums.

== History ==
The first mention of exotic animals being kept in Kraków dates back to 1406, when a pair of lions was transported from Florence to Kraków. Before the Zoological Garden in Kraków was established, a royal menagerie had existed on the Wawel Hill in the Middle Ages. The collection included such animals as monkeys, camels, lions, leopards, and many species of rodents. When King Sigismund III Vasa transferred the capital of Poland from Kraków to Warsaw in 1596, the menagerie experienced a period of decline. In the 18th and 19th centuries a number of other private menageries were established in various parts of Kraków, such as the Kraków Park (now the Marek Grechuta Park in Kraków). The activists of the Kraków branch of the Polish Copernicus Society of Naturalists Wincenty Wober, Kazimierz Maślankiewicz, Leon Holcer, and Karol Łukaszewicz conceived the idea to establish a zoological garden in Kraków and to locate it in Las Wolski, near the Camaldolese Hermit Monastery in Bielany.

The opening of the zoo took place on 6 July 1929, in the presence of President of Poland Ignacy Mościcki. On the day of the opening, the zoo was in possession of 94 mammals, 98 birds, and 12 reptiles. Antoni Koziarz was appointed the first director of the Kraków Zoo and held this position until 1966. During the Second World War, the zoo found itself under German administration and many of the animals kept in the zoo were transferred to other zoological gardens in Germany. In 1963, a company called City Park and Zoological Garden (Polish: Miejski Park i Ogród Zoologiczny) was established and a period of extensive rebuilding and modernisation took place.

Currently, the zoo contains 1,500 animals representing 260 species and occupies the area of nearly 17 hectares. The annual number of visitors amounts to 500,000. The zoo's breeding program resulted in the birth of an Andean condor in 2014. Other animals born in captivity in the zoo include: maned wolf, snow leopards, leopards, jaguars, fennec foxes, caracal lynxes, European wild cats, northern lynxes, ground cuscuses, black mangabeys, chimpanzees, lar gibbons, and common marmosets.

== Gallery ==
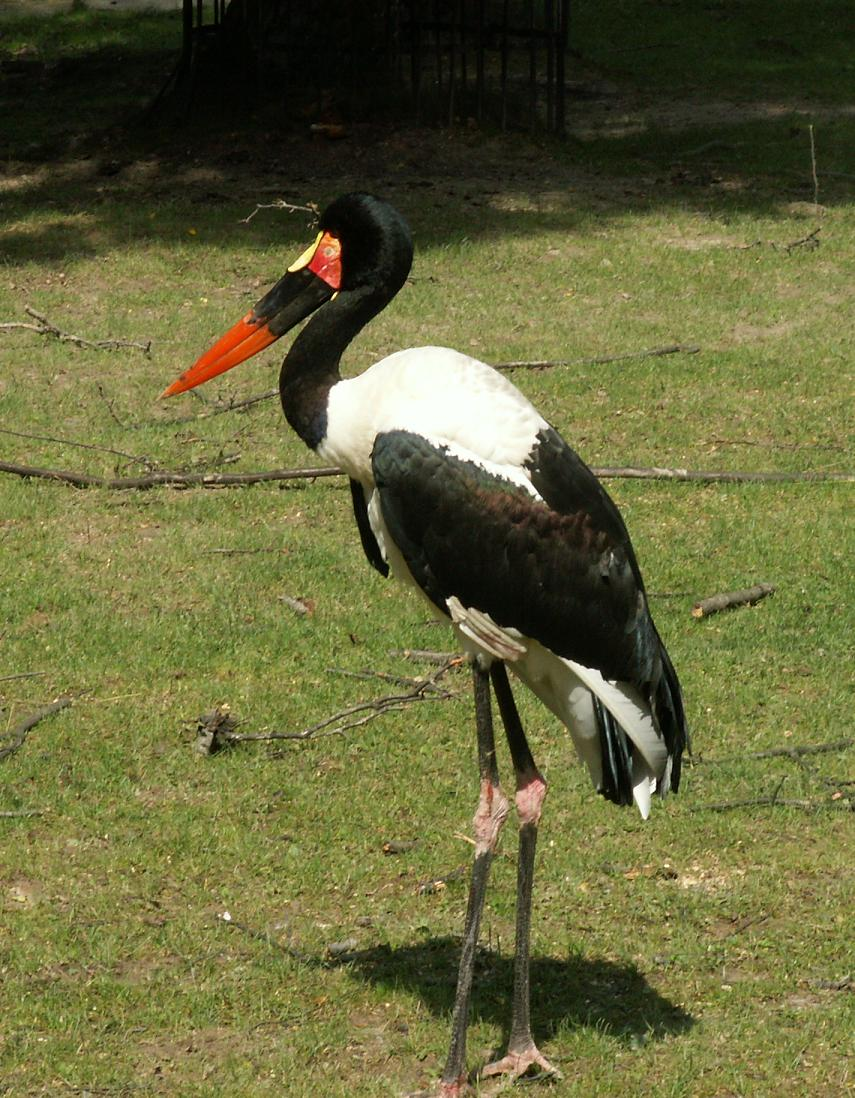
Saddle-billed stork

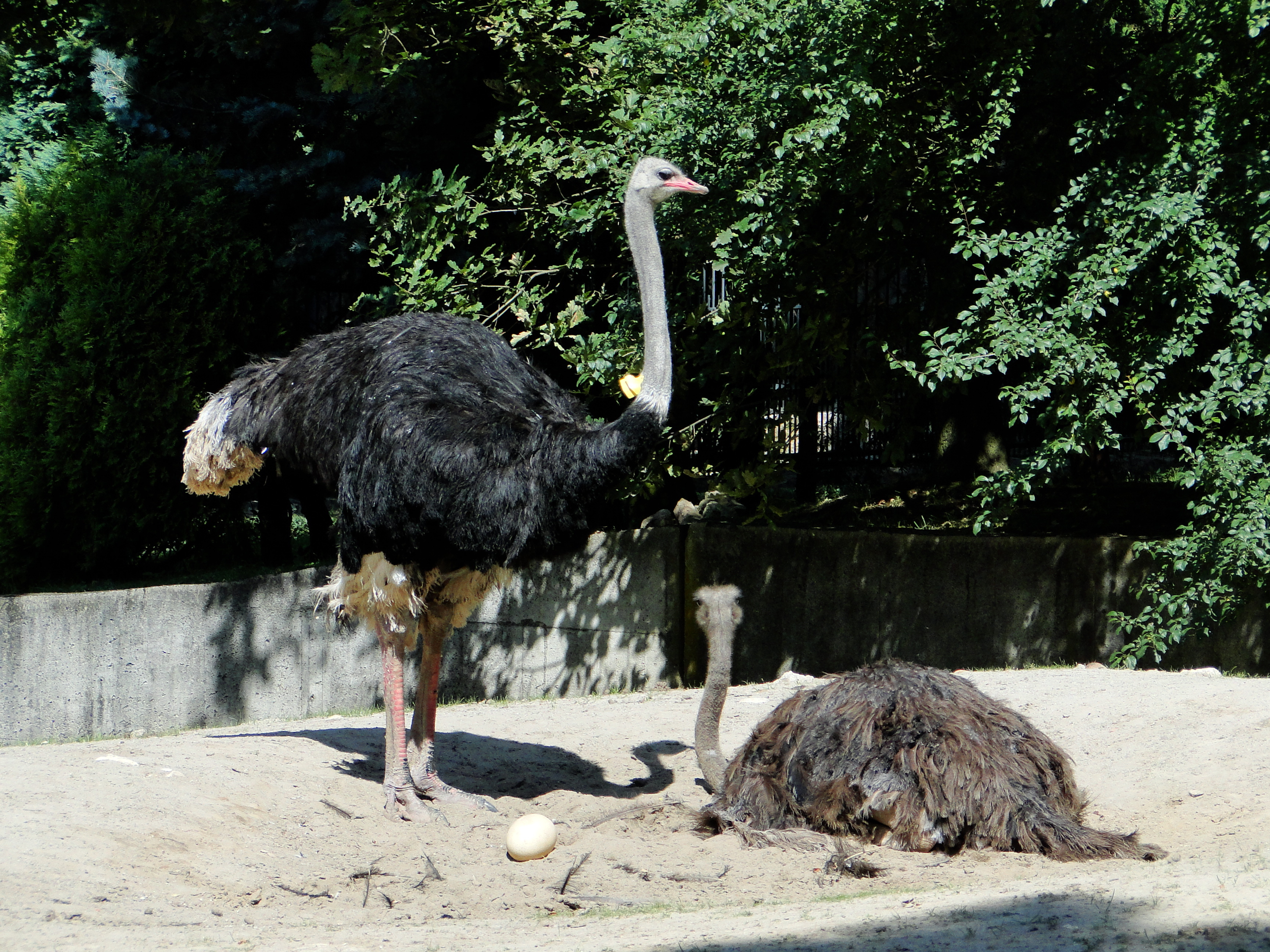
Ostriches

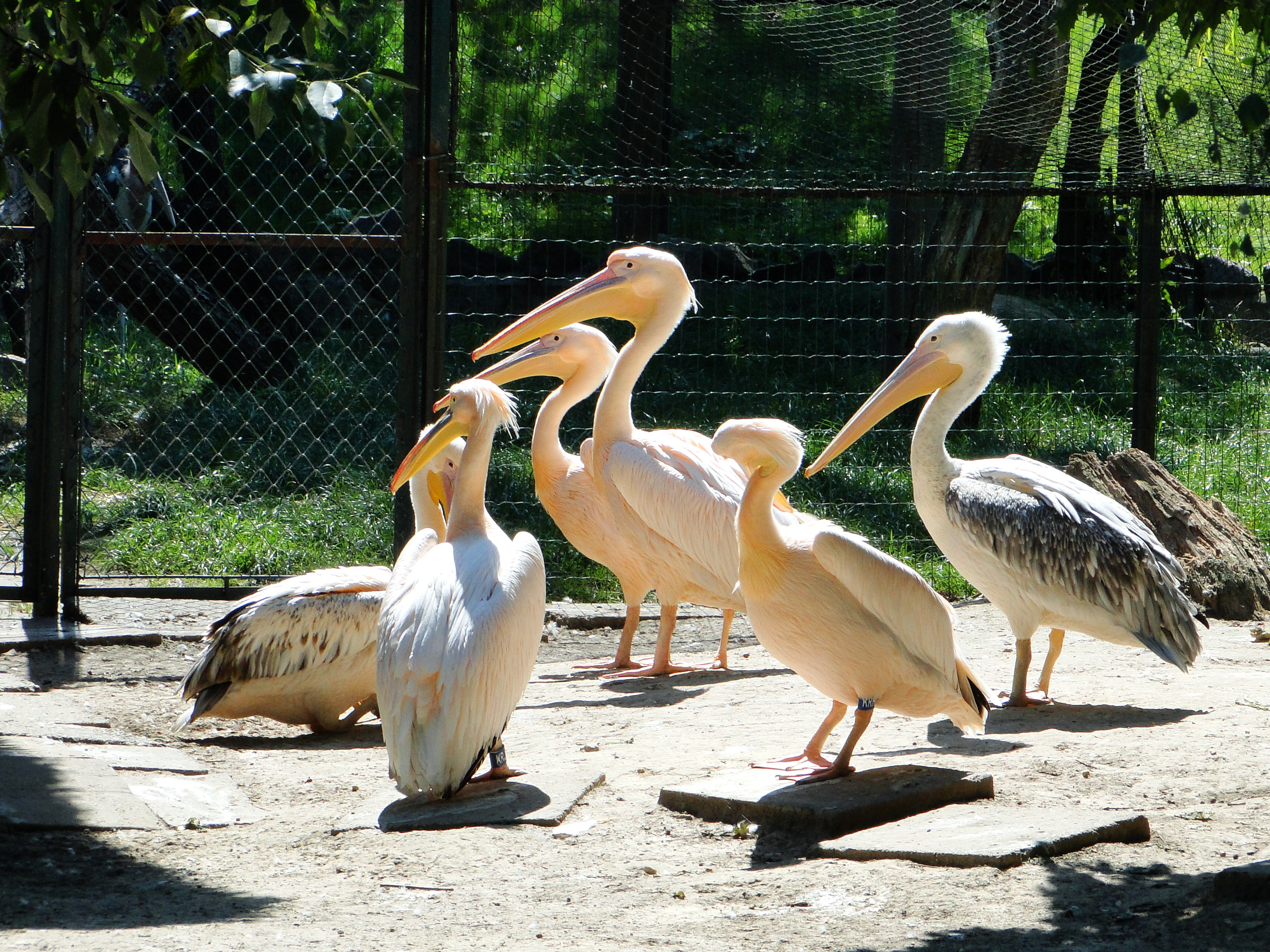
Great white pelicans

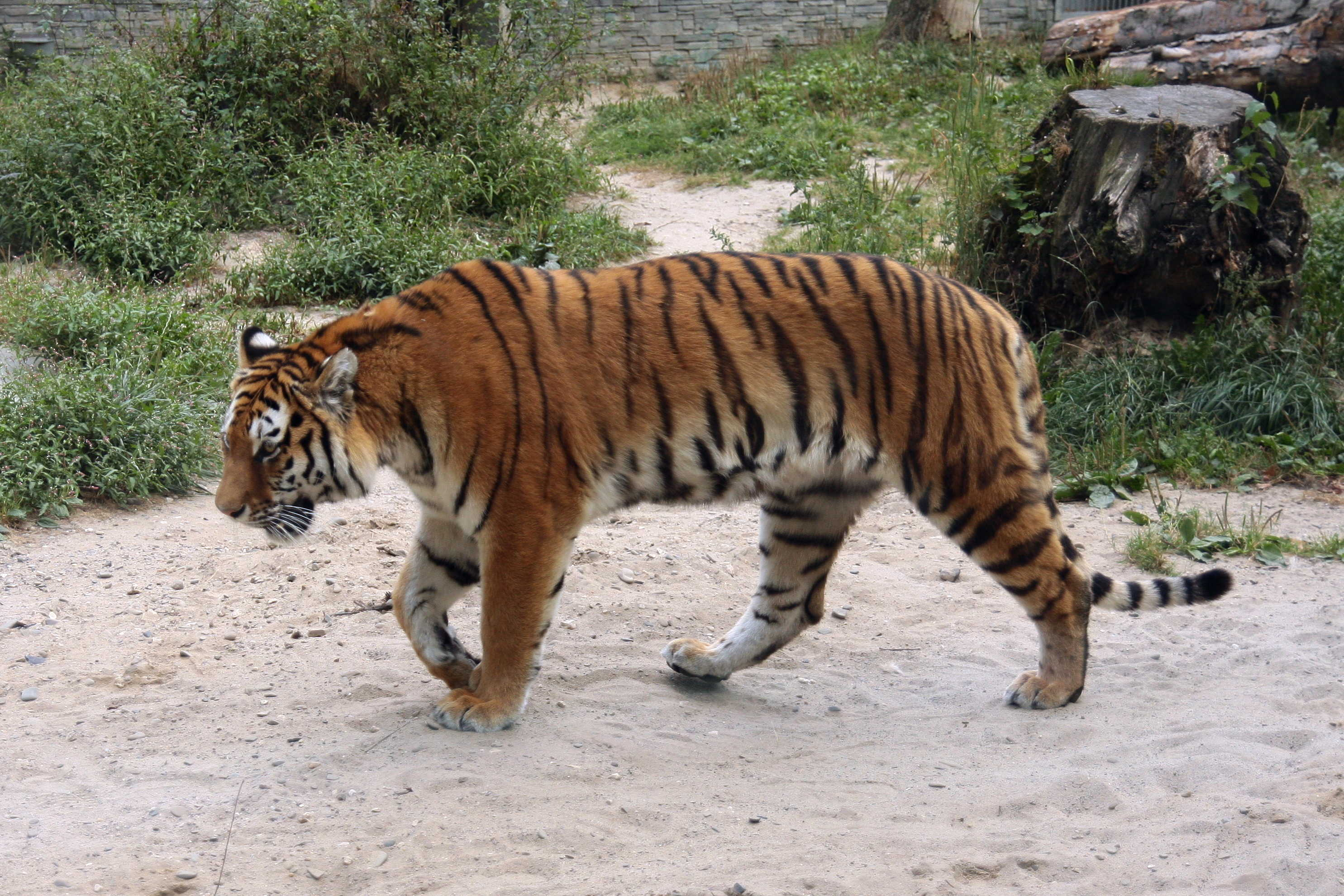
Tiger

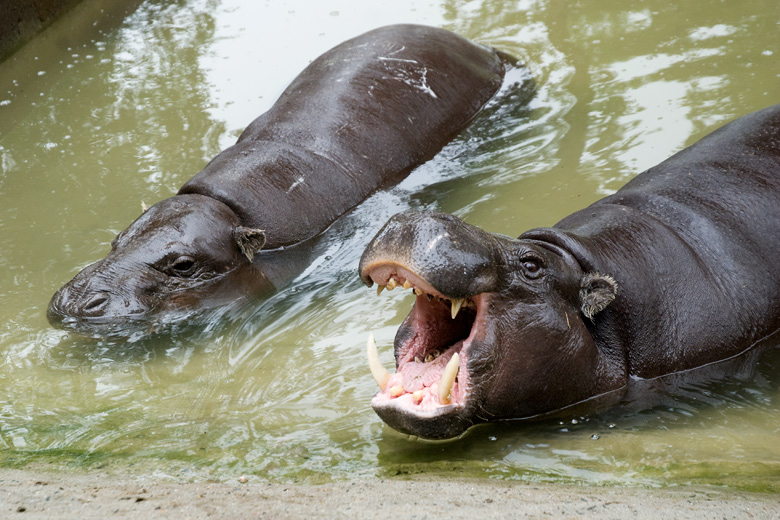
Pygmy Hippopotamuses

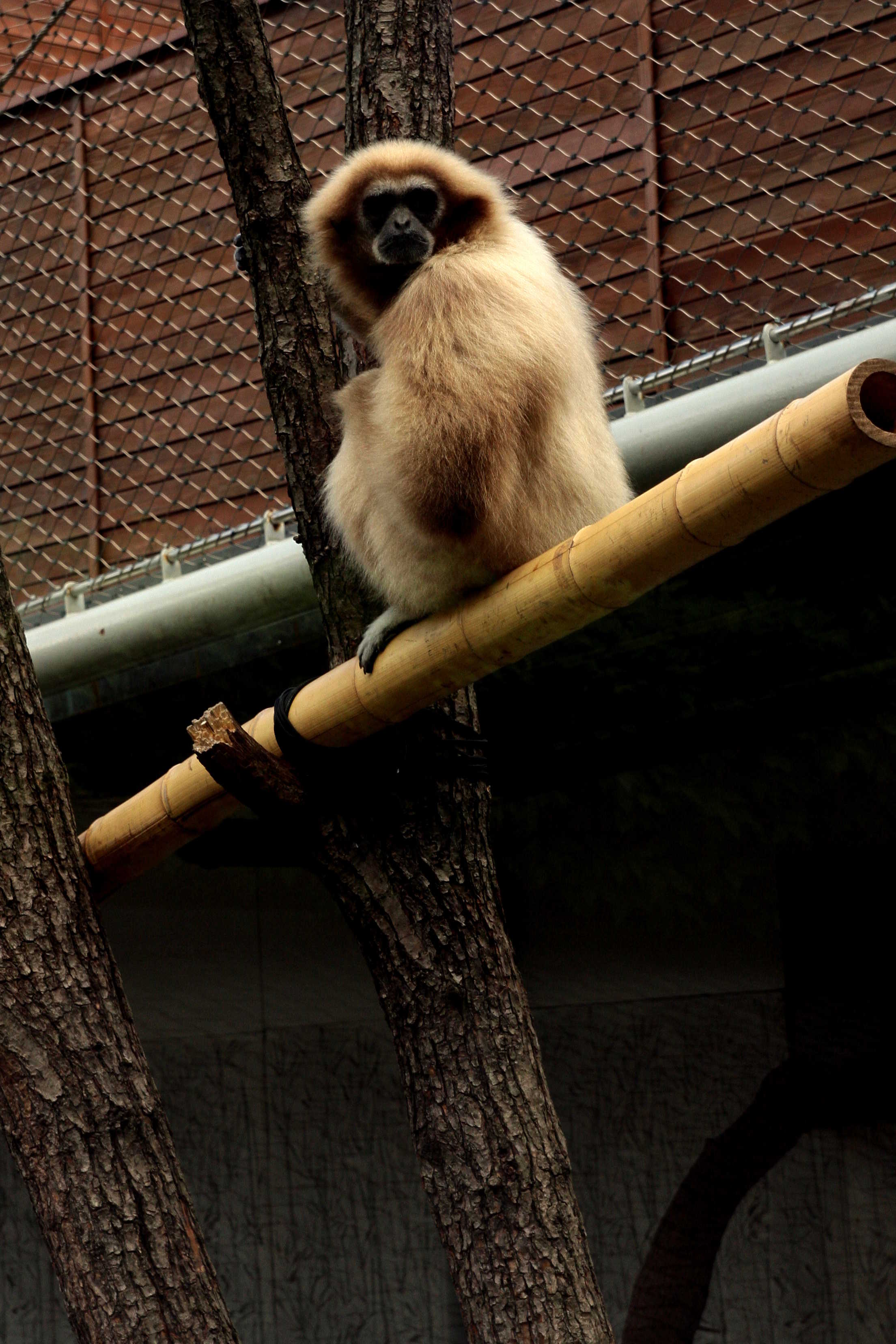
Lar gibbon

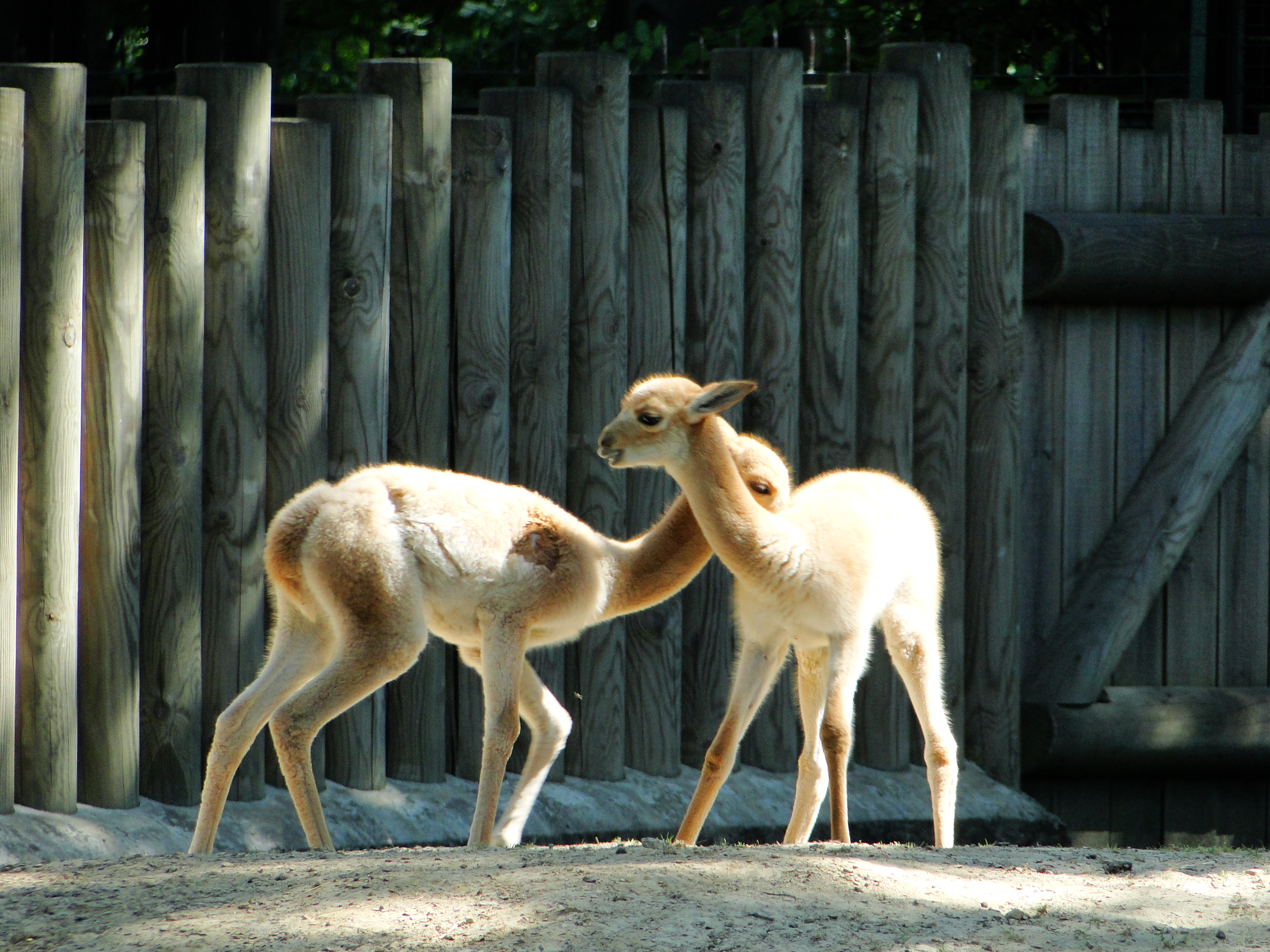
Vicuña

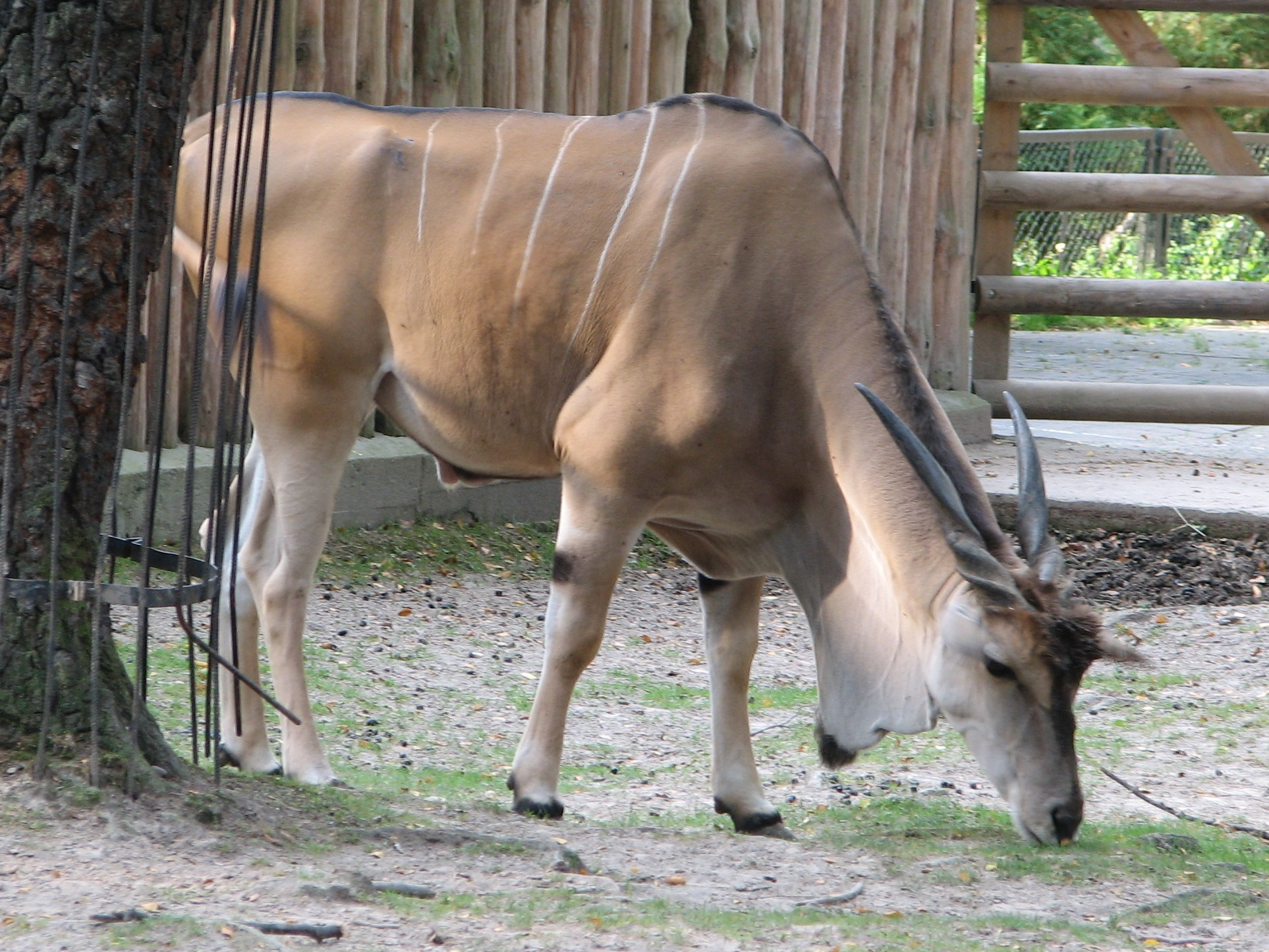
Common eland

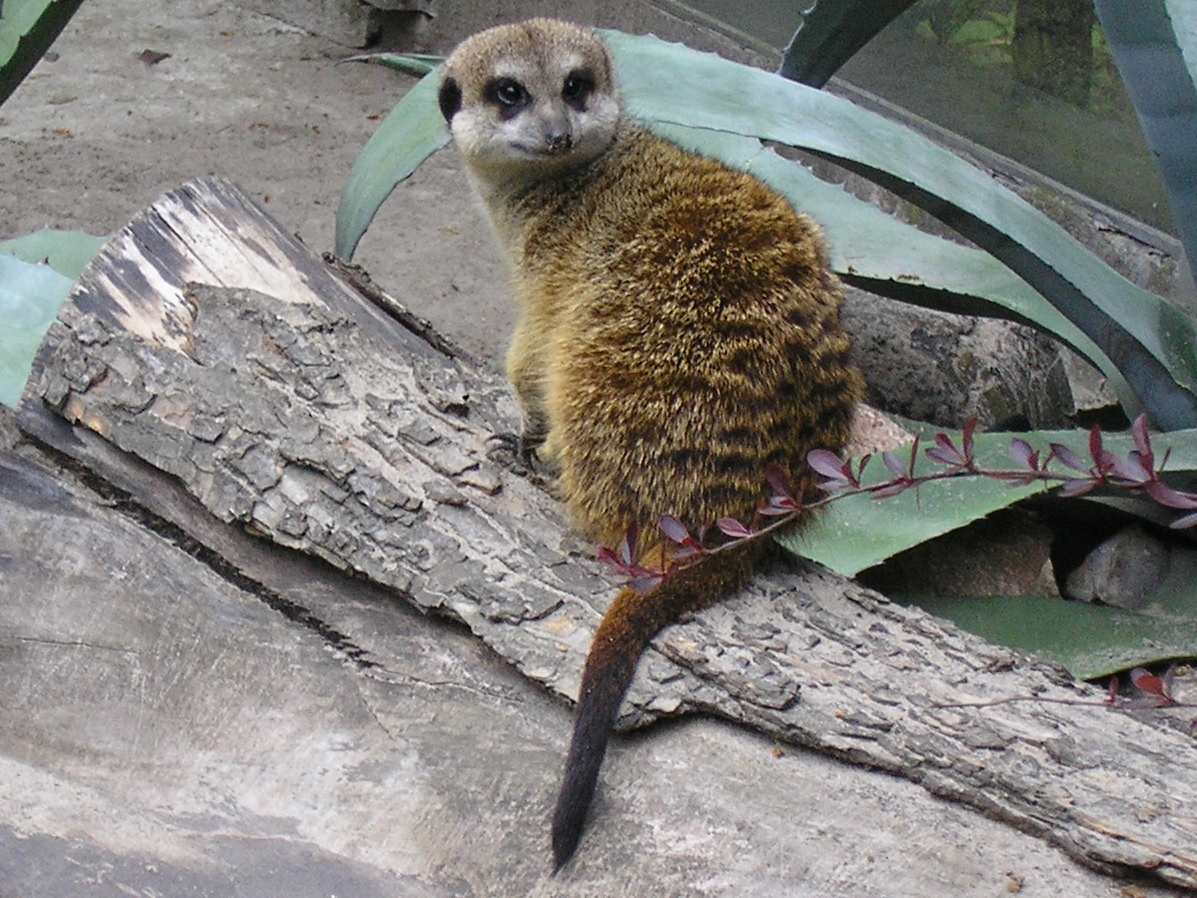
Meerkat

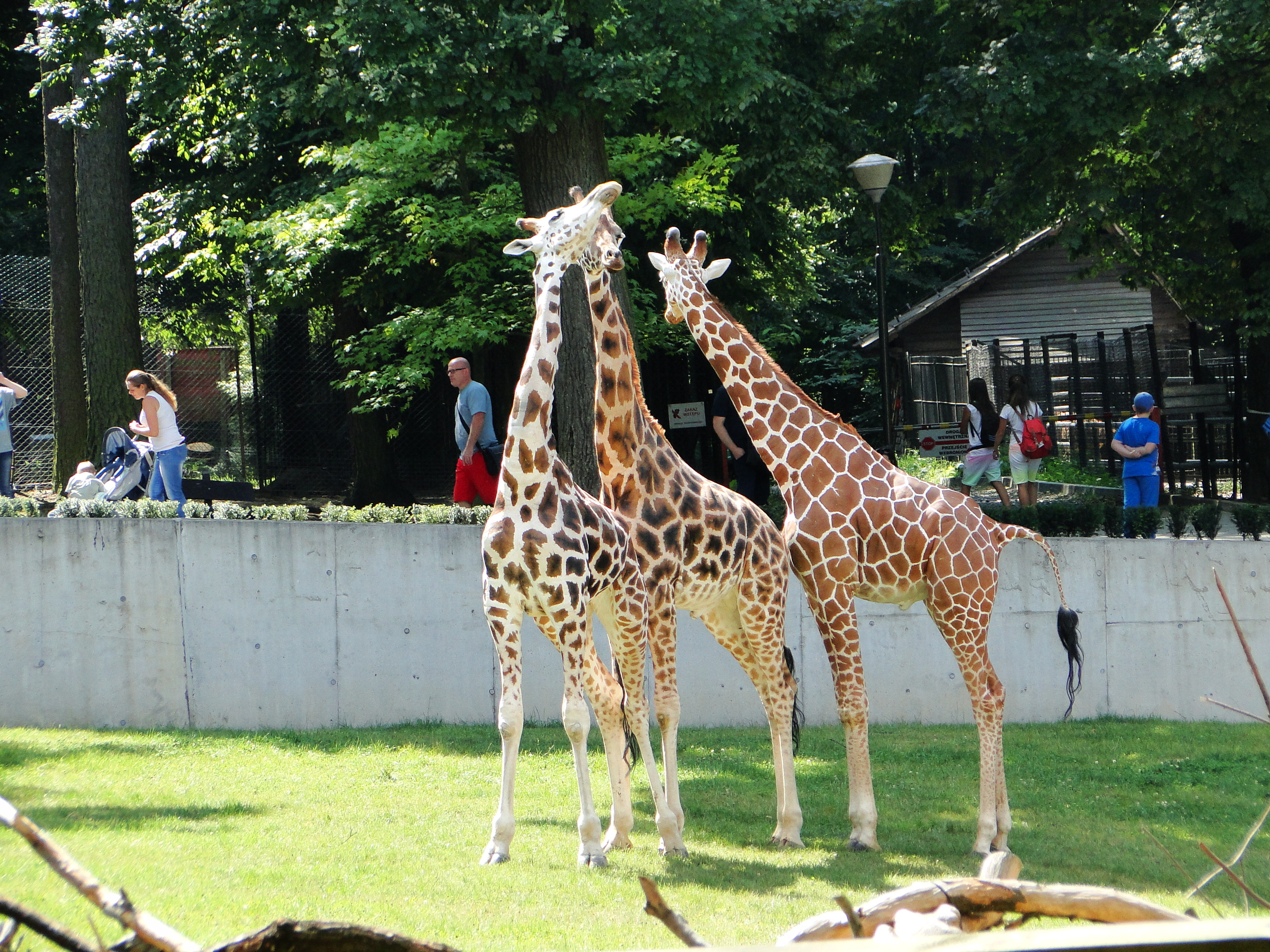
Giraffes

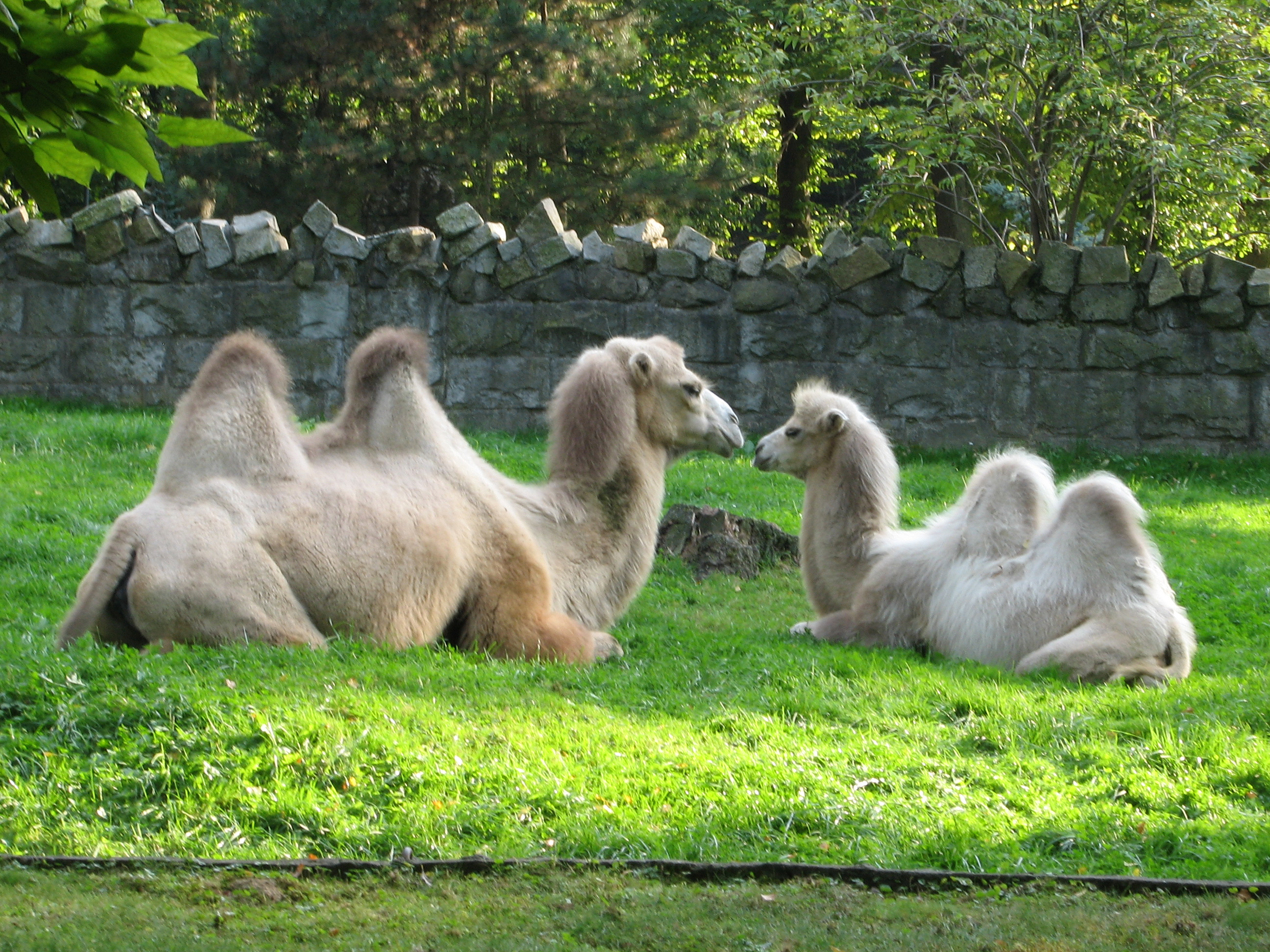
Bactrian camel

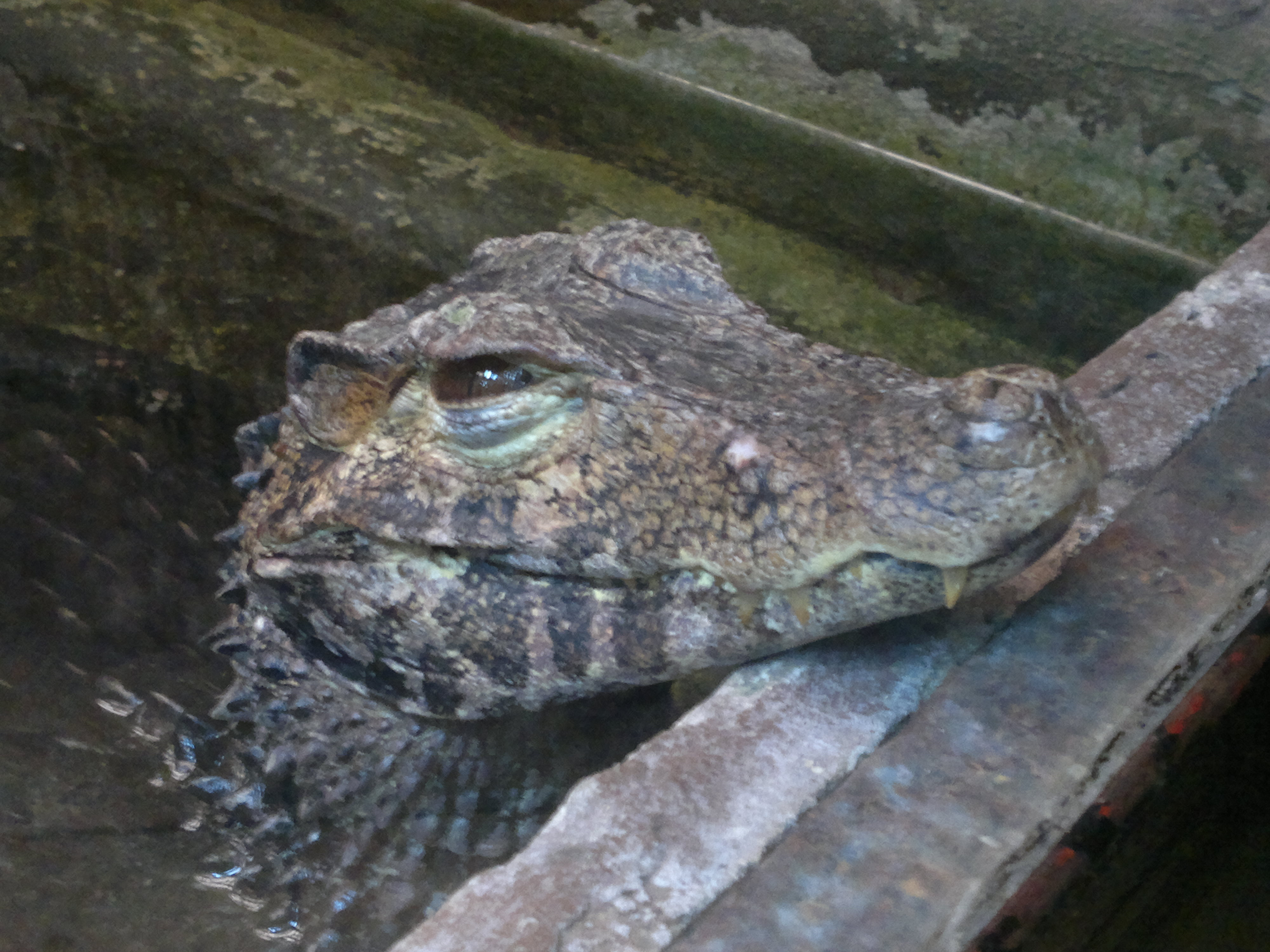
Crocodile

== See also ==
- Warsaw Zoo
- Wrocław Zoo
- Poznań Old Zoo
- Łódź Zoo
