= Pelagio =

Pelagio is a masculine given name and a surname.

Notable people with the name include:

== Given names ==
- Pelagio Antonio de Labastida y Dávalos (1816–1891), Mexican Roman Catholic prelate
- Pelagio Cruz (1912–1986), chief-of-staff of the Philippine Air Force
- Pelagio Galvani (c. 1165–1230), Spanish cardinal
- Pelagio Luna (1867–1919), Argentine politician
- Pelagio Palagi (1775–1860), Italian painter, sculptor and interior decorator
- Pelágio Sauter (1878–1961), German Roman Catholic priest

== Surnames ==
- Pedro Pelágio (born 2000), Portuguese footballer

== Music ==
- Pelagio (Mercadante), opera

== See also ==
- Pelagius (disambiguation)
- Pelayo (disambiguation)
