= Pelagius (disambiguation) =

Pelagius (c. 360 to 435) was a British monk whose theology is known as Pelagianism.

Pelagius may also refer to:

- Pelagius of Constance (c. 270–c. 283), Pannonian child martyr
- Pope Pelagius I (died 561), reigned 556–561
- Pope Pelagius II (died 590), reigned 579–590
- Pelagius of Asturias (c. 685–737), first king of Asturias
- Pelagius the Hermit (fl. 9th century), Spanish hermit
- Pelagius of Cordova (c. 912–c. 926), Galician Christian child-martyr
- Pelagius (bishop of Lugo) (died 1000)
- Pelagius of Oviedo (died 1153), Spanish bishop of Oviedo
- Pelagius Galvani (c. 1165–1230), or Pelagio Galvani, Spanish cardinal
- Alvarus Pelagius (c. 1280–1352), Galician canonist

== See also ==
- Pelagio (disambiguation)
- Pelayo (disambiguation)
- Pelagianism
