= Pelayo Rodríguez =

Pelayo Rodríguez may refer to:

- Pelayo Rodríguez (bishop), Bishop of Iria Flavia, 977–985
- Pelayo Rodríguez (count) (fl. 985–1007), count of the Kingdom of León
- Pelayo Rodríguez (majordomo), majordomo of Alfonso VI of León and Castile, 1102–1107
