= Camaldolese Priory, Kraków =

Camaldolese priory in Bielany in Kraków, Poland

Coordinates: 50°02′44″N 19°50′27″E

Camaldolese Priory
- Kościół Wniebowzięcia Najświętszej Maryi Panny
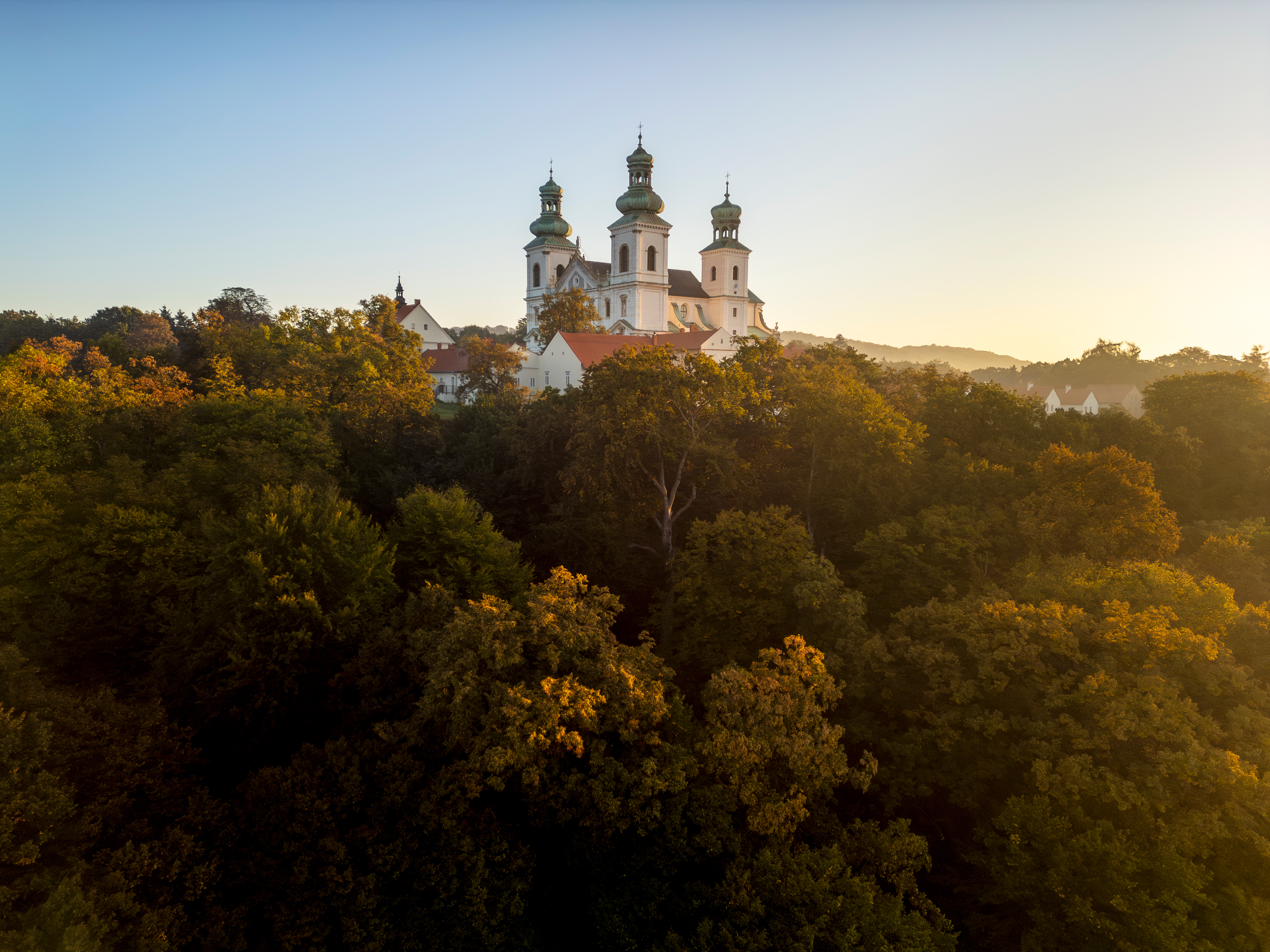

Monastery information
- Full name: Camaldolese Hermit Monastery
- Denomination: Catholicism
- Dedication: Assumption of Mary
- Archdiocese: Kraków

Architecture
- Groundbreaking: 1609
- Completed date: 1630

Site
- Location: 30-248 Kraków, Lesser Poland Voivodeship
- Country: Poland

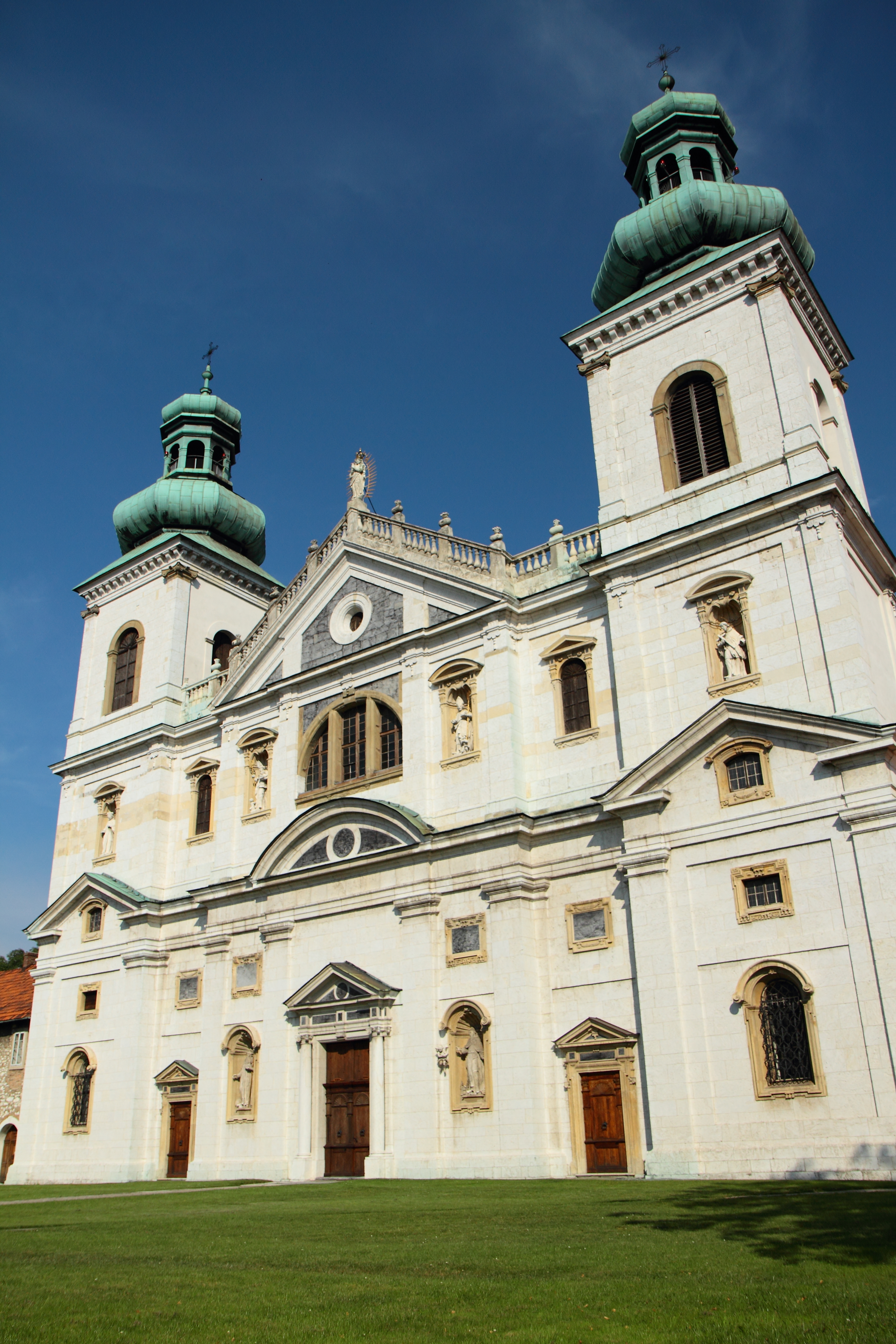
Façade of the Church

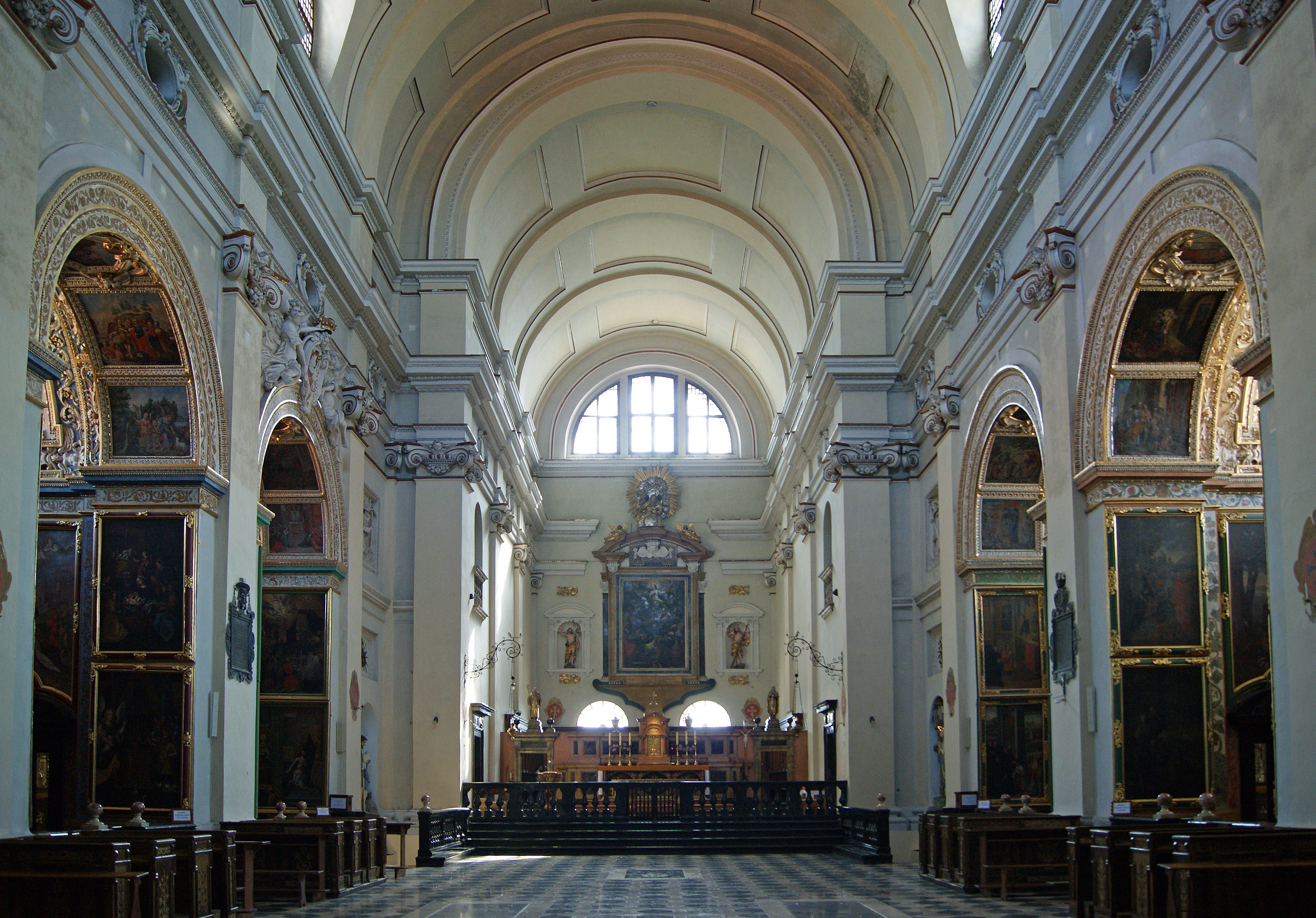
Interior of the monastery

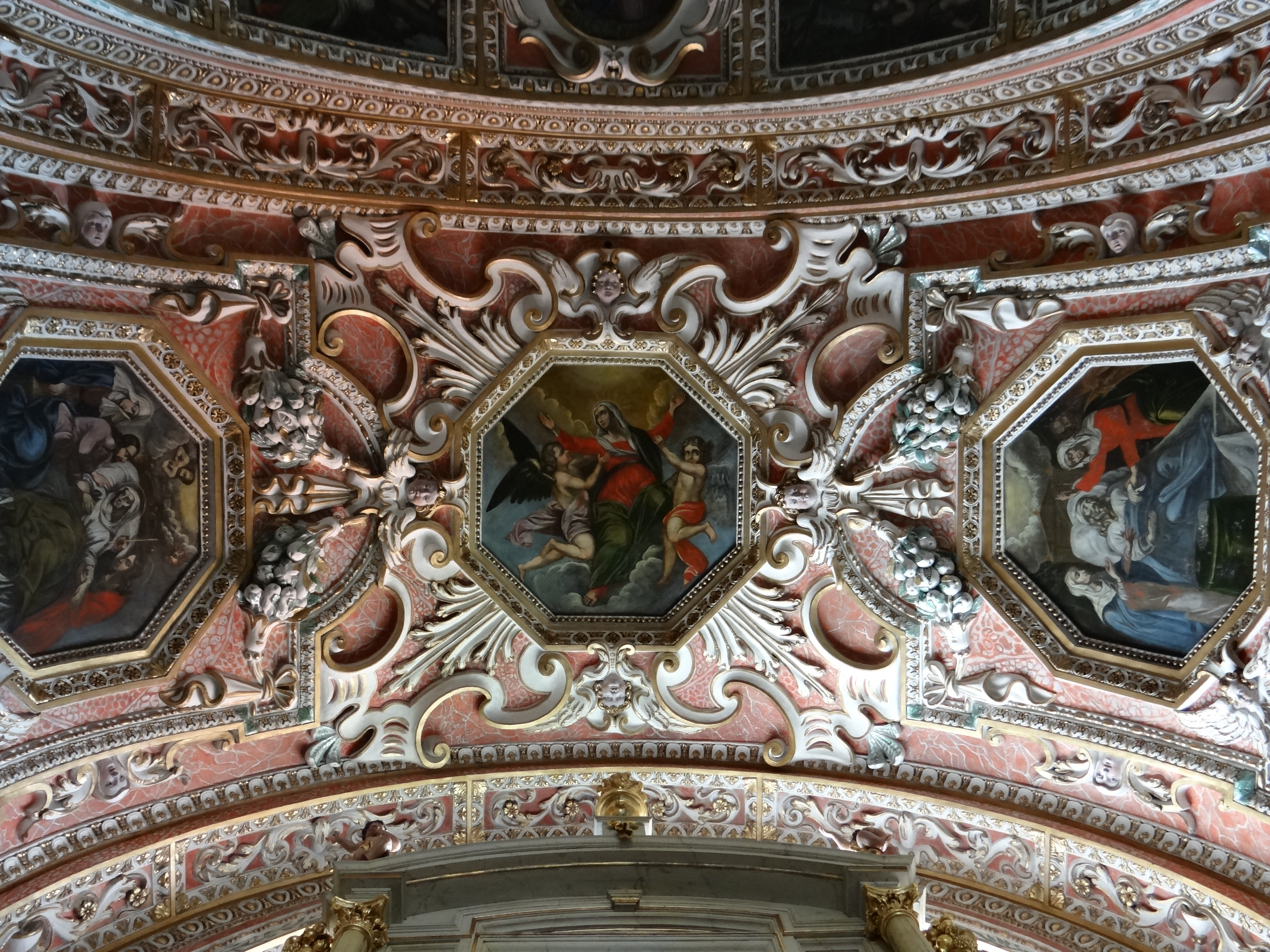
Architectural details of the interior

Camaldolese Hermit Monastery in Kraków (Polish: Kościół Wniebowzięcia Najświętszej Maryi Panny w Krakowie) is a Camaldolese priory in Bielany in Kraków, Poland. The monastery is located on the 326-metre (1,070 ft) Silver Mount. It consists of hermitages and the Assumption of Mary Church.

== History ==
The Camaldolese monks were invited to settle in Bieleany by Grand Court Marshal Mikołaj Wolski in 1603. The monastery was built between 1609 and 1630. The construction of the building was supervised by Walenty von Säbisch but after the collapse of part of the monastery the supervision over the works was subsequently taken over by Italian architect Andrea Spezza. By 1630, the monastery was completed according to his plans.

Throughout its history the monastery was visited by such kings as John III Sobieski, Władysław IV Vasa, John II Casimir and Stanisław August Poniatowski. On 19 August 2002, the church was visited by Pope John Paul II during his pilgrimage to Poland.

== Art ==
The richly decorated interior of the church is the result of works by another prominent Italian architect of the period Giovanni Falconi. Inside the Royal Chapel there are paintings by Tommaso Dolabella the court painter of the Polish king Sigismund III Vasa. The central part of the presbytery features a painting by a Polish painter and graphic artist in the Romantic style Michał Stachowicz depicting the Assumption of Mary.

== Visiting ==
The monastery is open daily for visiting by men only. Entrance is allowed daily at 10:00-11:00, 15:30-16:30.

Women are only allowed to visit the monastery on twelve days of the year:

1. Easter Sunday
2. Easter Monday
3. May 3 - Feast of the Blessed Virgin Mary, Queen of Poland
4. Pentecost Sunday
5. Pentecost Monday
6. Sunday after June 19
7. 2nd Sunday of July
8. 1st Sunday of August
9. August 15 - Assumption of Mary
10. September 8 - Nativity of Mary
11. December 25 - Christmas Day

On these days, the Holy Mass takes place at 11.30. Masses are also offered:

- December 24/25 (Christmas Eve): Midnight Mass (men only)
- Pentecost Sunday: 8.00, 9.30, 11.30, 16.00, 18.00 (men and women)
- Pentecost Monday: 9.30, 11.30, 16.00, 18.00 (men and women)

== Address ==
Camaldolese Priory (Klasztor OO. Kamedułów)
Al. Konarowa 1
30-248 Kraków
Poland
