= Pelayo Rodríguez (majordomo) =

Pelayo Rodríguez was the majordomo of Alfonso VI of León and Castile from about 1102 to 1107. He is first mentioned in that office in a charter of 16 March 1104, and the last reference to him as majordomo dates to 14 May 1107.
