= Spanish ship Pelayo =

Various Spanish Navy ships

Two ships of the Spanish Navy have borne the name Pelayo, after Pelagius of Asturias (c. 685–737), the Spanish nobleman who founded the Kingdom of Asturias in 718:

- Pelayo, a brigantine built in 1849 and decommissioned in 1867.
- Pelayo, a battleship in commission from 1888 to 1924.
