= Ermita de San Pelayo y San Isidoro =

Ruined Romanesque church, originally in the city of Ávila, Spain

Coordinates: 40.4206°N 3.6804°W

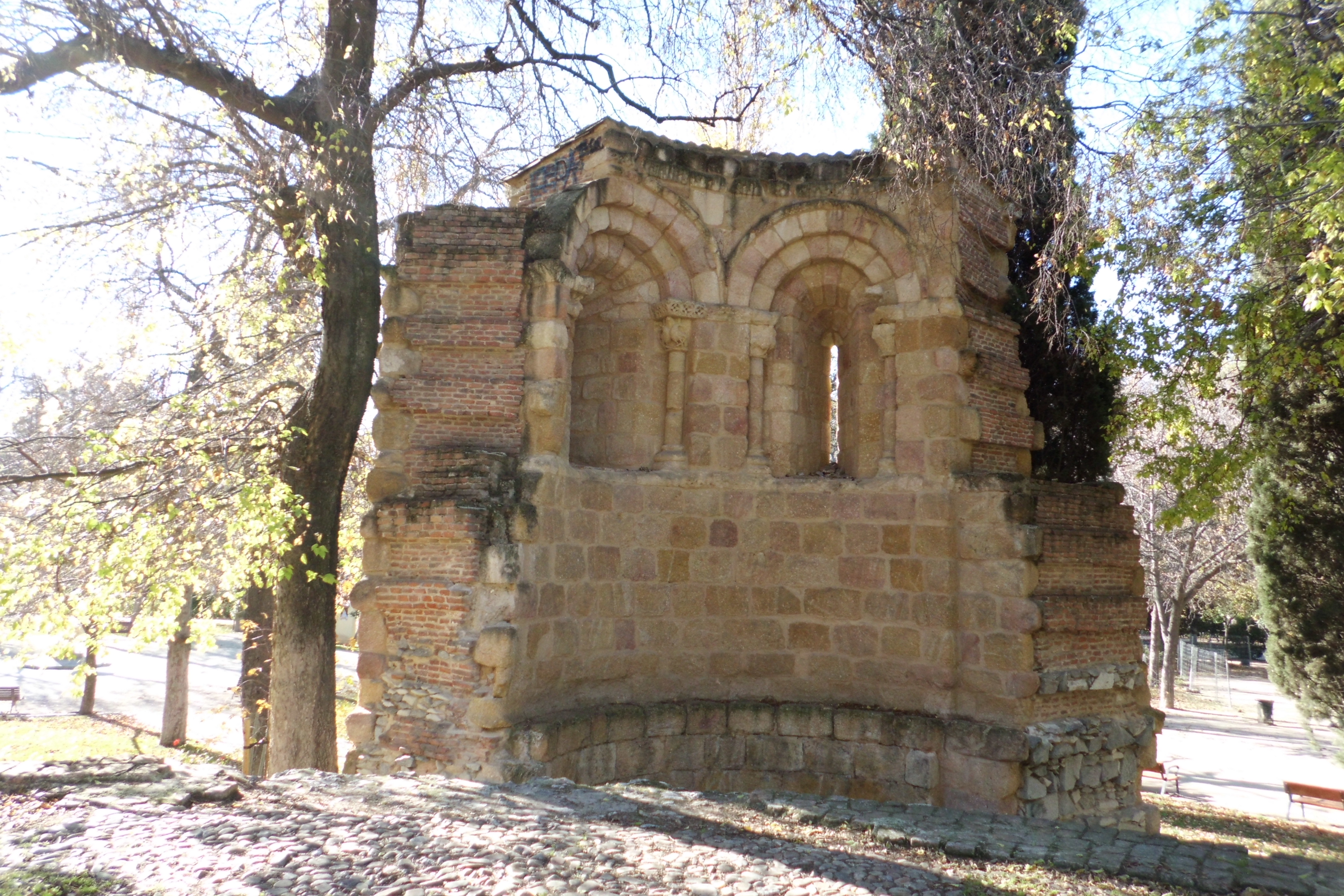
Ruins of the apse

The Ermita de San Pelayo y San Isidoro (English: Hermitage of Saint Pelagius and Saint Isidore) is a ruined Romanesque church, originally in the city of Ávila, Spain. It was built outside of the southern city walls, in front of the Gate of Malaventura. In Ávila, there remains an area known as the Atrium of San Isidro. After the Spanish confiscation, it was moved to Madrid, where it had different locations. The remains were eventually relocated to the Buen Retiro Park in central Madrid.

== History ==
Its first patronage was to the Córdoban child martyr, Pelagius, and is cited in a document of the year 1250, which says that the church was exempt from taxation. Moreover, there is a text of consecration carved on a tombstone dated to the year 1270.

In honores S Marial, Deo Christi, Pelagio ipso me Petro Abulense quedámo; varones vere Christiani confirmavit, atq; consecravit Ecclessimq, reducta es Isidorum, Chalendis nobembris, Era 1270, año 1232. Et in honores divi Marial, fecit consecrare hanc Ecclesiam cuis animae Requiescat impace, Amen.

Historians who have studied this tombstone suggest that this might refer to a second consecration of the church when the dedication of Saint Pelagius was changed to Saint Isidore. After this, no more documents have come to light that would inform the development and evolution of the small temple until the book of the Confraternity of San Isidro, which was discovered in the sacristy of the church of San Nicolás in Ávila, in the 19th century.

It is also cited that before the patronage this hermitage had Saint Isidore's relics before being transferred to León in 1062.

It is also known through the documents of the Archives of Ávila, the Academy of Fine Arts, and the General Archive of the Administration of Alcalá de Henares, the circumstances of its transfer to Madrid after the Spanish Confiscation.

=== Confiscation and move to Madrid ===
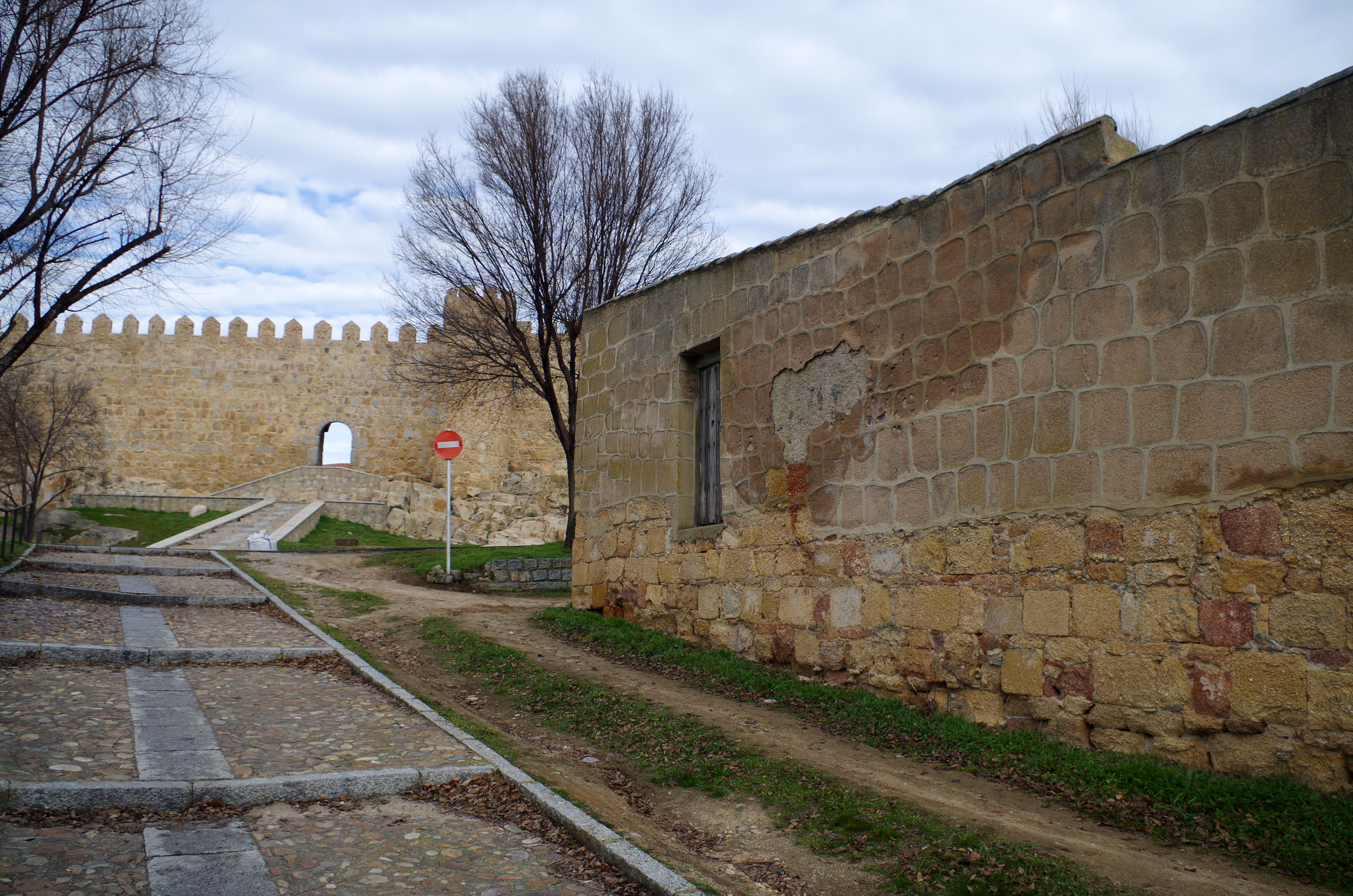
Ashlars that stayed in situ after the removal of the hermitage in Ávila

In the 19th century, the church was under the ownership of the Asociación de Labradores (Association of Farm workers), during which it transitioned its patronage to Saint Isidore. Around 1854, the edifice suffered significant damage, prompting the City Council to mandate the Association to demolish it. The Association offered the temple to the City Council, but the offer was declined. Preparations were made to initiate the necessary demolition work. However, years passed without any action being taken until 1876, when the State enforced the law of Confiscation. This led to the demolition of the church in 1877, with the remnants of the structure being sold to private individuals. This allowed a neighbor of Ávila to buy most of the stones. Emiliano Rotondo Nicolau, an engineer and businessman with an interest in archaeology and a resident of Madrid, purchased the remaining ashlars and architectural elements. After a failed attempt to sell to the City Hall of San Sebastian, Rotondo Nicolau sold the ruins to the Real Academia de la Historia in 1893 for 18,000 pesetas. The new location of the church was within the gardens of the Museo Arqueológico. Its purpose extended beyond being a relic of the Romanesque era; it was designated for use as a chapel where Mass would be conducted every Sunday following the Mozarabic Rite.

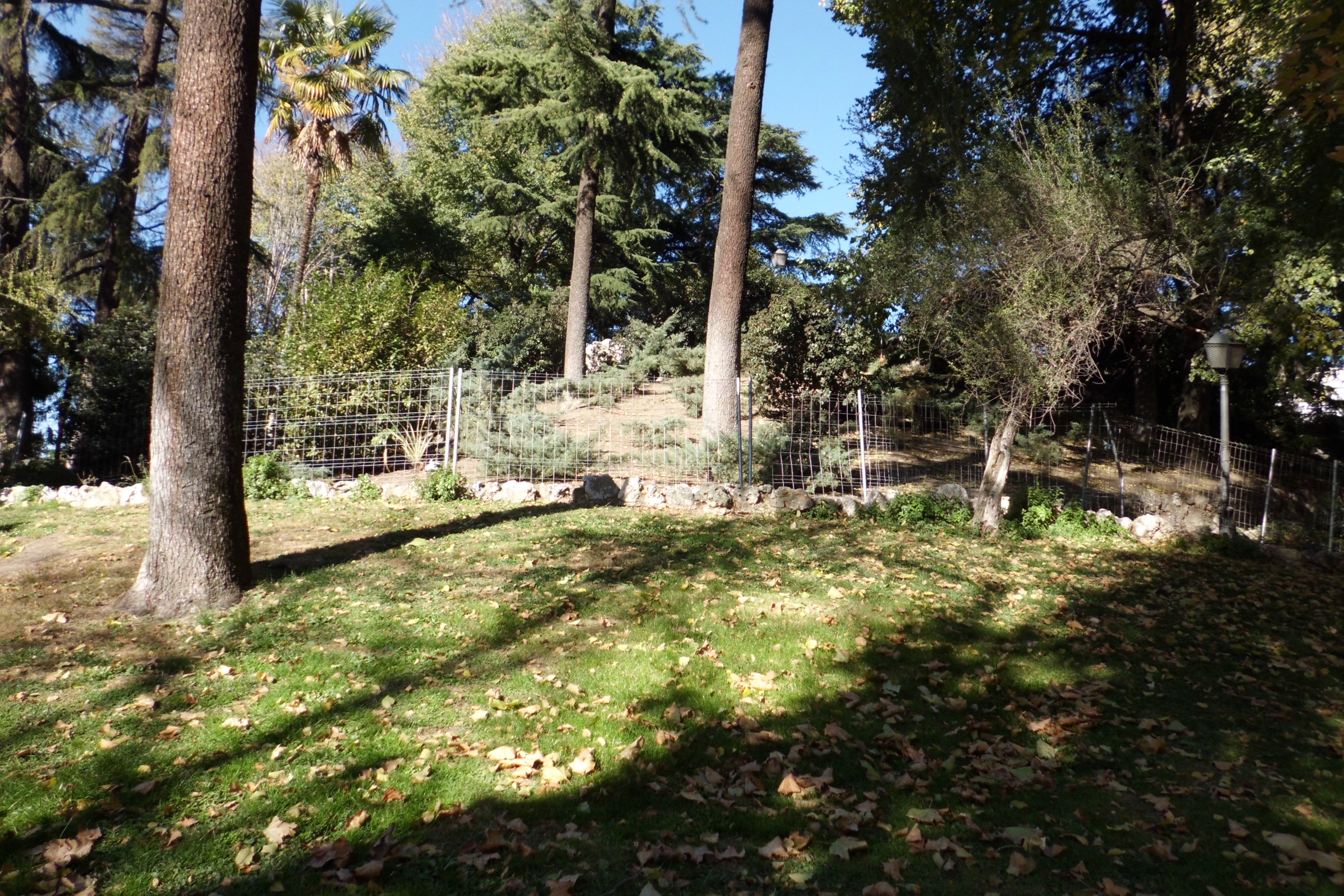
Environment of the hermitage; view of the Montaña artificial from the ruins

However, this plan remained merely a project until 1897, when Cánovas del Castillo took an interest in the monument and the museum. He then transferred ownership to the City Hall of Madrid, directing the relocation of the church to Buen Retiro Park under the supervision and design of the architect Ricardo Velázquez Bosco. The chosen location, near the intersection of O'Donnell and Menéndez Pelayo, in close proximity to the Montaña Artificial, offered a setting surrounded by ancient trees. While it could have been left in a state of ruin, the building fell into further neglect and obscurity. It wasn't until the early 21st century that the City Council of Madrid took action to restore the site, reclaiming scattered stones, capitals, shafts, cornices, and other architectural elements to revive its historical significance.

== Building description ==
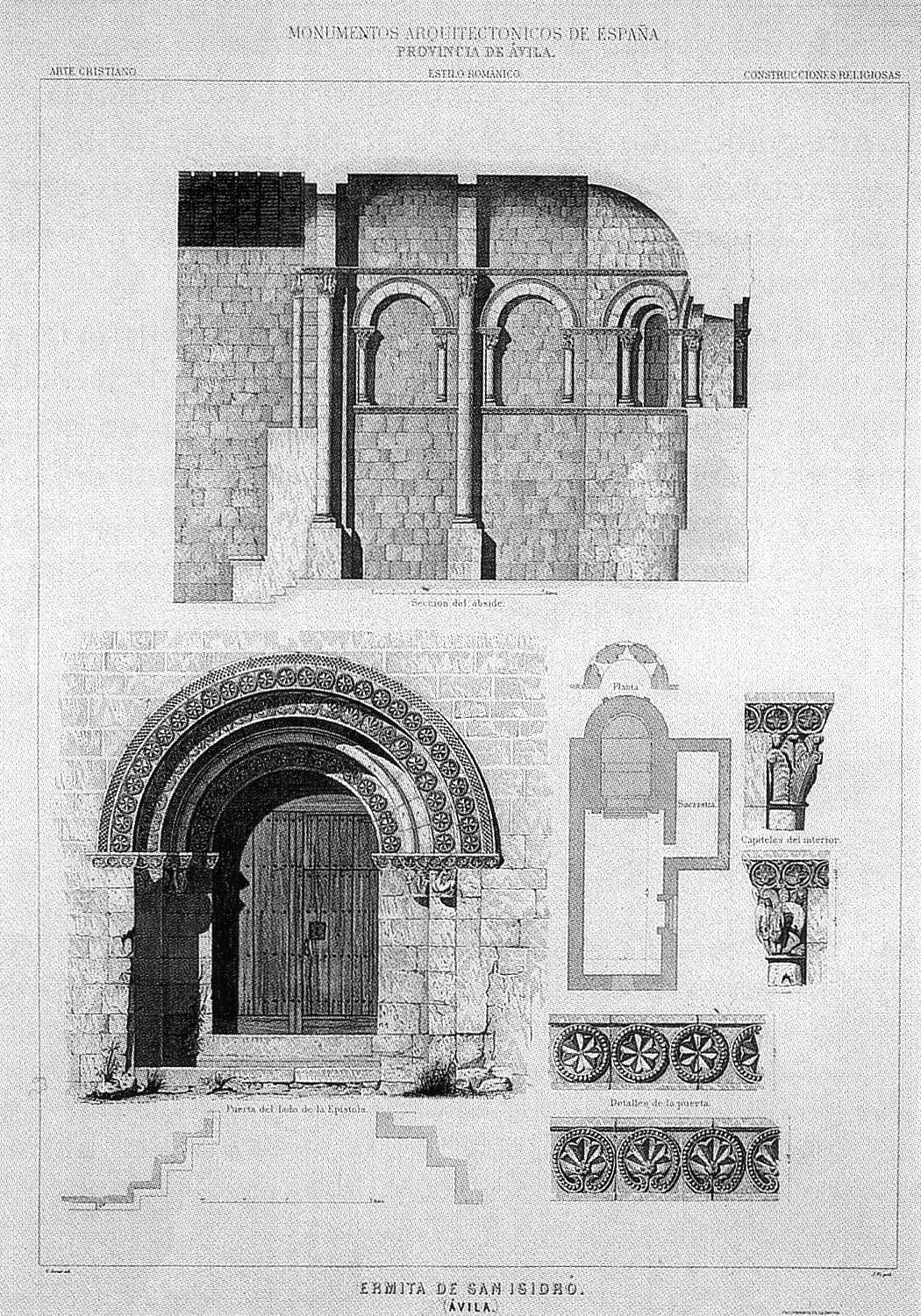
Drawing of Francisco Aznar within the work Architectural Monuments of Spain, 1856–1882

The hermitage was made in rectangular ashlars of limestone. It was a temple of unique nave with wood cover. The head was semicircular with semi-dome, and straight section with barrel vault in turn divided into two parts. Both the architectural structure of the head as well as the decorative motifs that can be seen in the drawings of Van den Wyngaerde, Repullés and Francisco Aznar link this building with San Vicente, San Pedro and San Andrés of Ávila, so the date of construction can approach that of those temples, the mid-12th century.

In the unique nave it opened two doors, one to south and one to the west (puerta de los pies); still the remains of one of the two in which it can be seen the three midpoint archivolts that support in the abacuses united to impost. Although almost not noted, this impost is carved with roses of four petals inscribed in circles. The same rosettes formed the decoration carved of the archivolts; yet it can guess its trace. The capitals had a zoomorphic and vegetal decoration. Despite the deterioration, the acanthus leaves could still be seen.

In the apse it opened into three semicircular windows with archivolt and chambrana. Two remain as witness and it can distinguish the deep flare ending in a narrow arrowslit. The archivolts rest on abacuses and capitals that were decorated with leaves and birds with the beak between the legs, like those that can be seen in the Iglesia de San Andrés of Ávila. According to the preserved drawings, the straight section had blind arches of a single arch whose capitals were decorated with plant motifs, lions and birds. The study of this decoration has been suggested in the workshops that carved San Pedro and San Vicente and the covers of San Andrés.

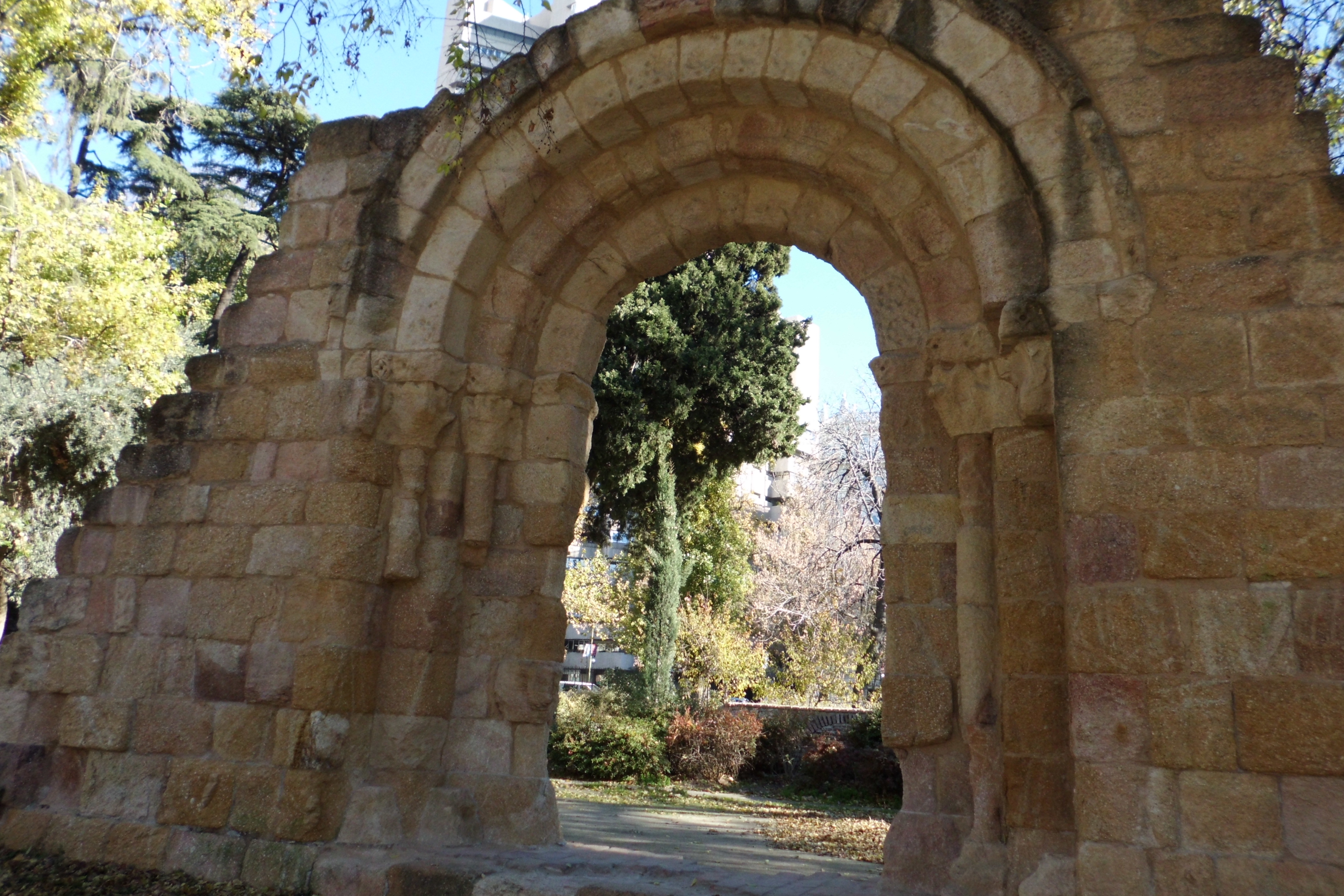
Romanesque door

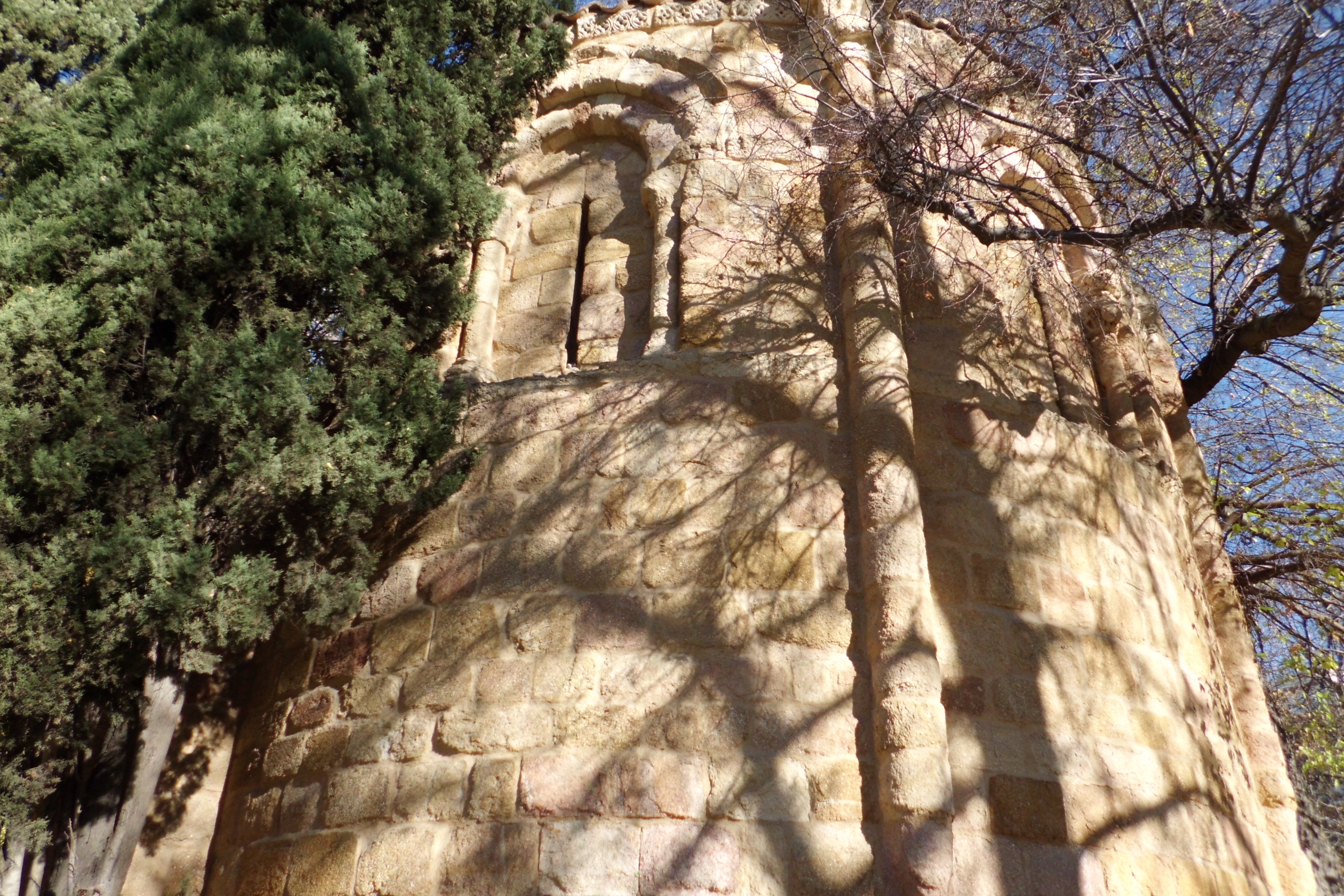
Exterior of the apse

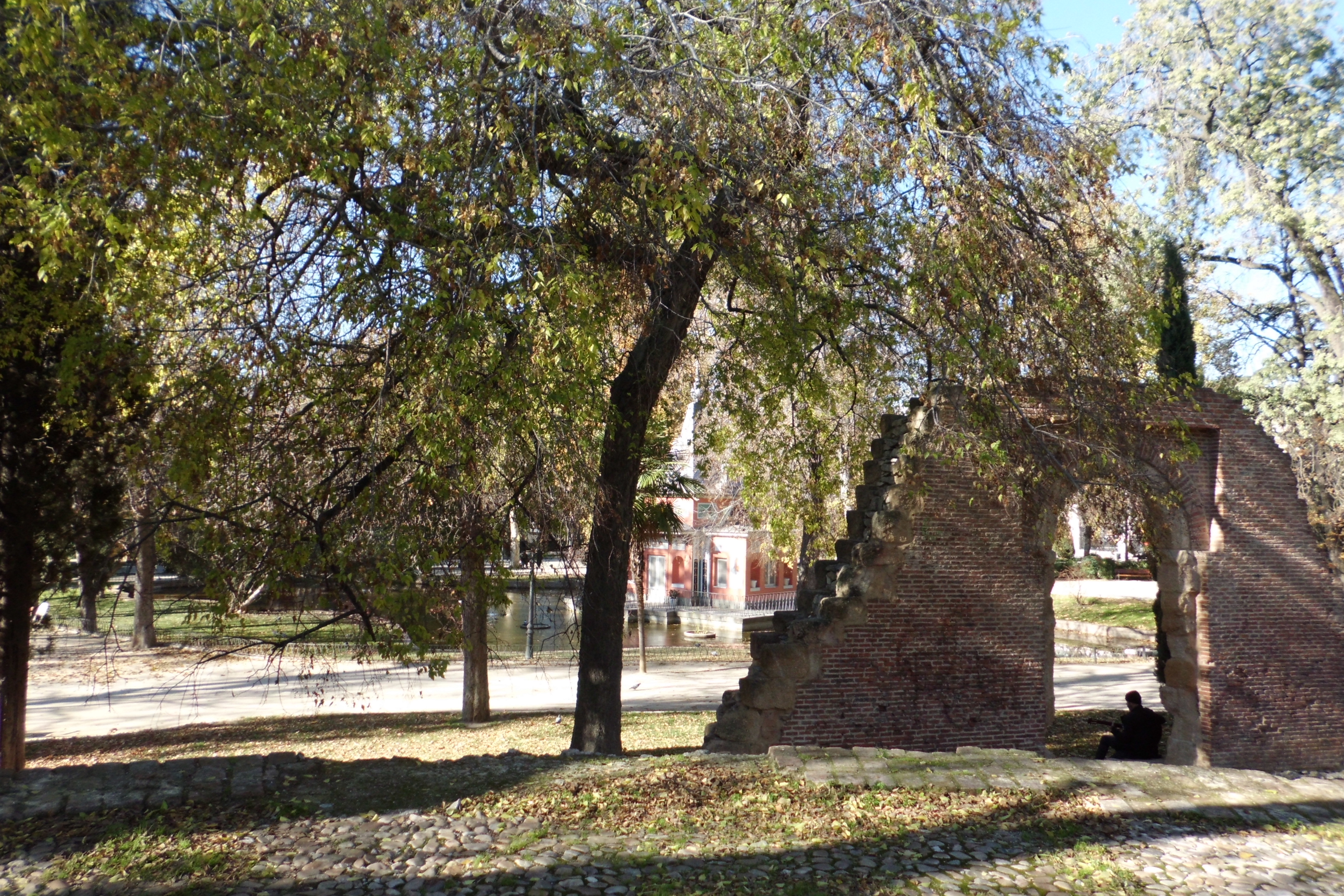
Inside part of the door; at background the Casa del Pescador

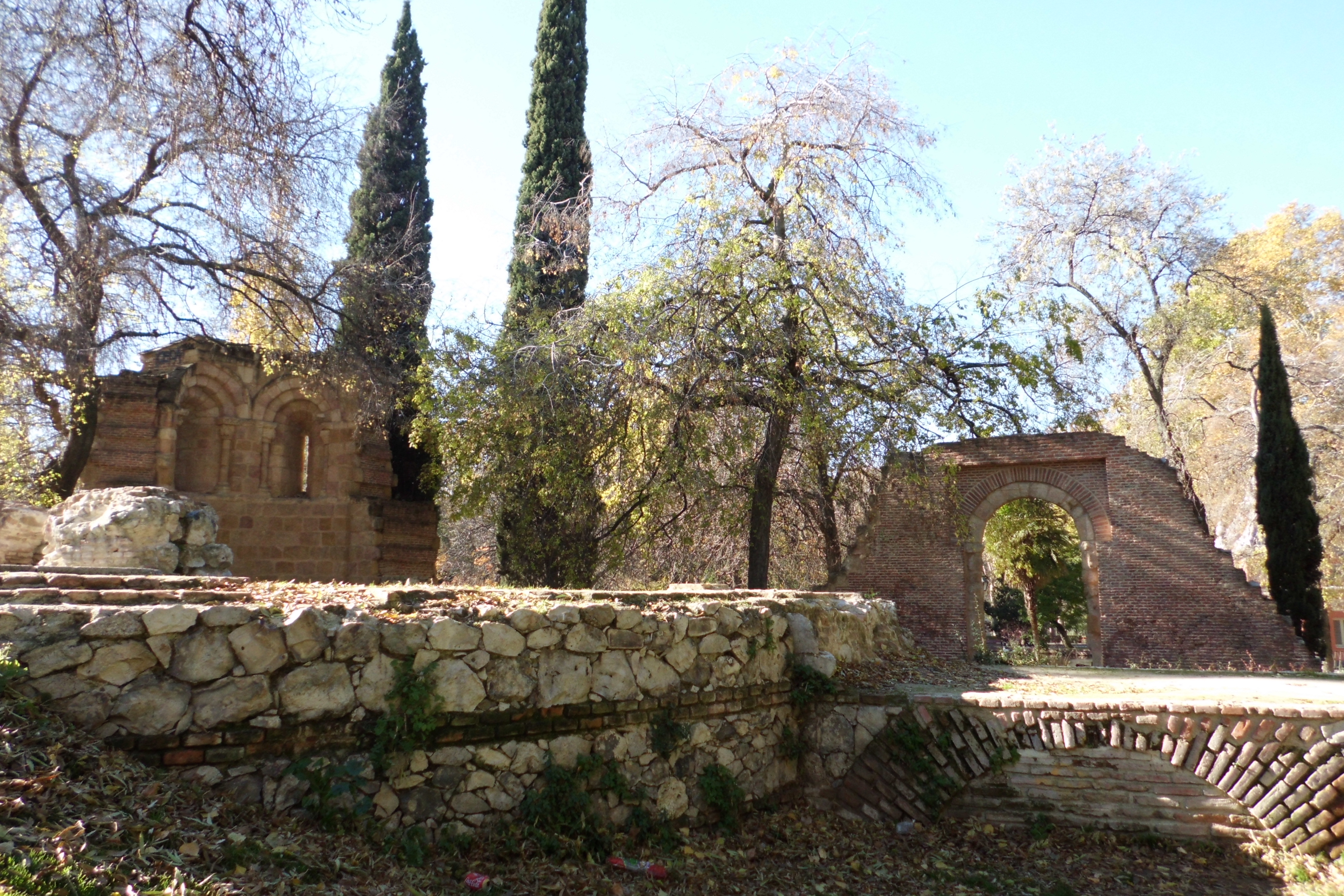
Ruins everywhere

== See also ==
- Romanesque architecture in Spain
