= Bielany, Kraków =

Former village, former XXXII quarter of Kraków, Poland

Bielany
- Former village Former XXXII quarter of Kraków
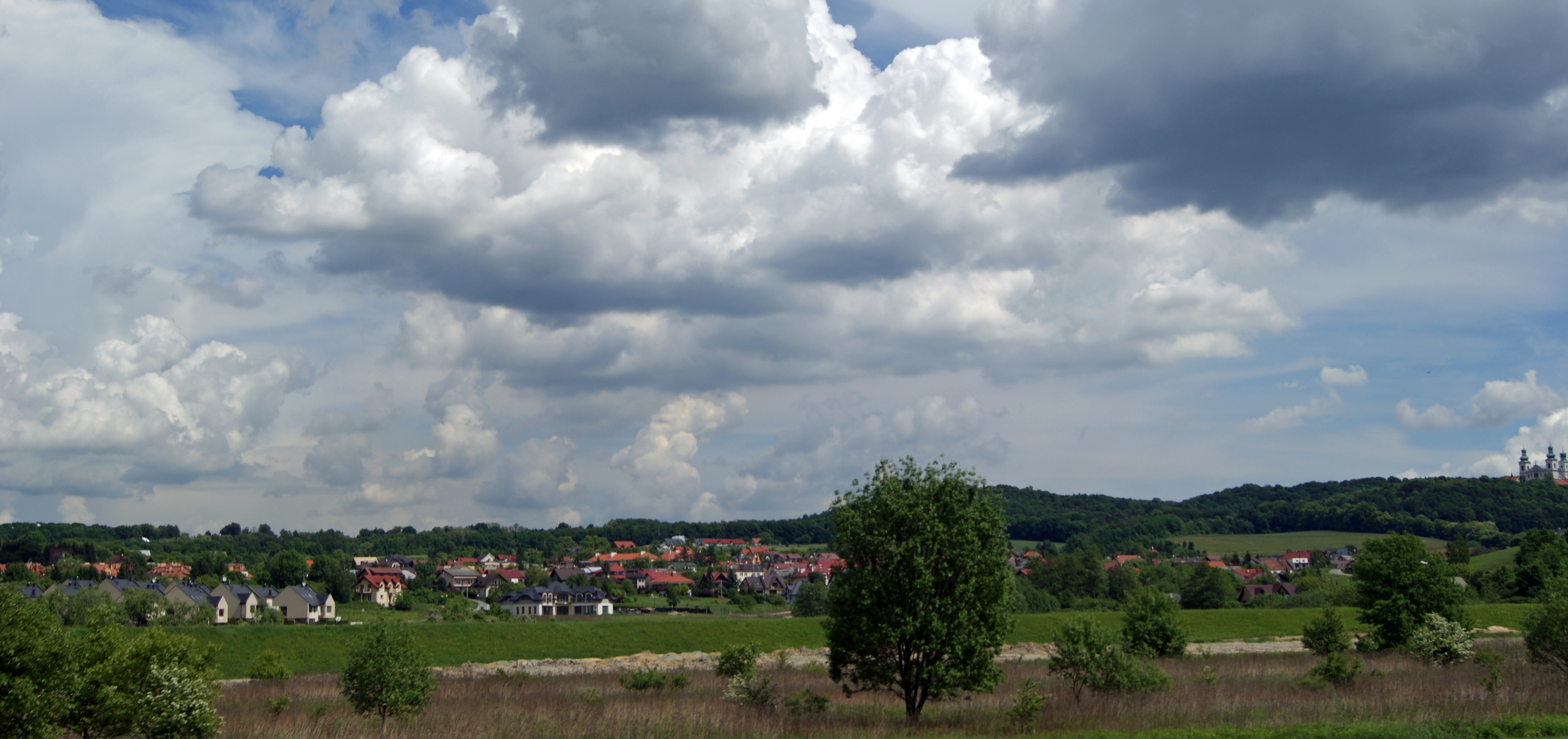
- Bielany. View from S.

- Bielany on the map of the District VII Zwierzyniec
- Coordinates: 50°02′45″N 19°50′26″E
- City: Kraków

Bielany [bʲɛˈlanɨ] former village, incorporated on 1941 (formally 18 January 1945) as the XXXII quarter of Kraków, Poland. Located some 7 kilometres (4.3 mi) west of the city centre. It is now part of the District VII Zwierzyniec.

== History ==
The first written record of Bielany comes from the 12th century. In the first half of the 17th century a Camaldolese monastery was established there, damaged in 1655 during the Siege of Kraków (1655) in the course of the Polish-Swedish war. It was rebuilt after a subsequent fire in 1814.

Under the Austrian Partition, after 30 years of deliberation and planning, in 1901 Kraków's first municipal water supply plant opened in Bielany. Additional capacity was provided in 1917, and the plant is still in use today in a limited capacity.

The nature reserve called Bielany Little Rocks (Polish: Rezerwat Skałki Bielańskie) on the southern slope of the monastery hill was established in 1957.

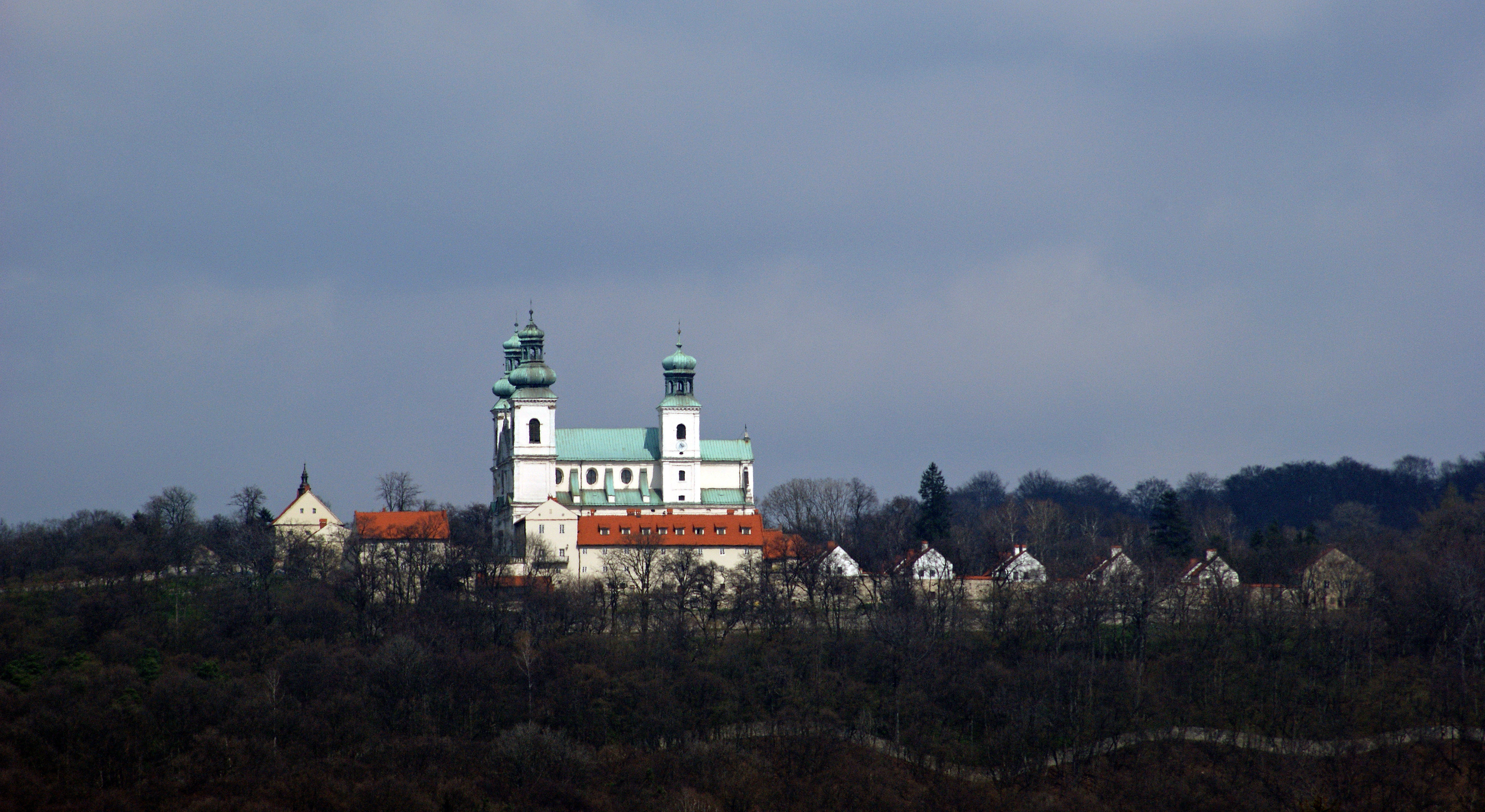
Church of the Assumption of the Blessed Virgin Mary and Camaldolese Monastery
1 Konarowa Avenue

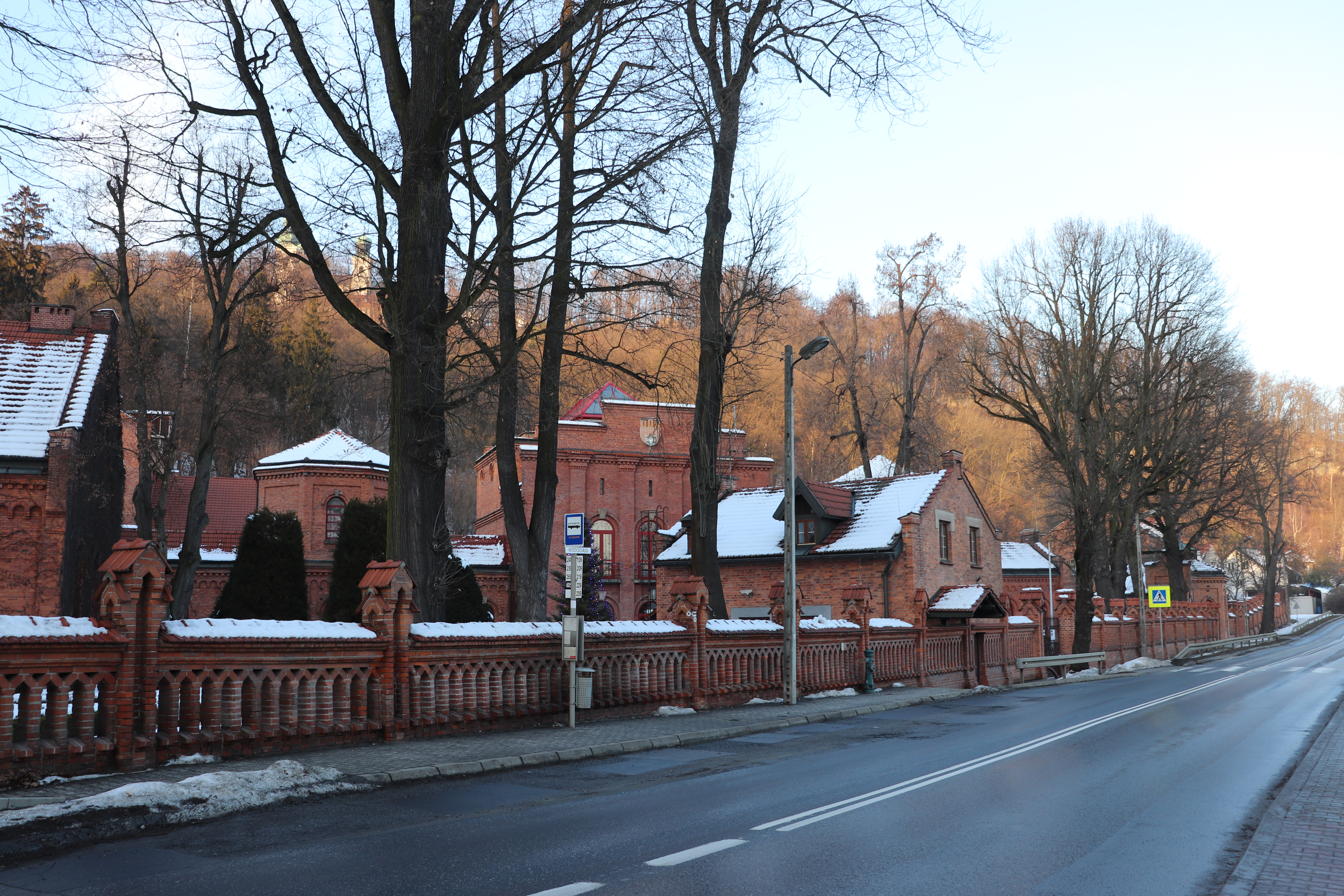
Municipal waterworks
299 Księcia Józefa Street

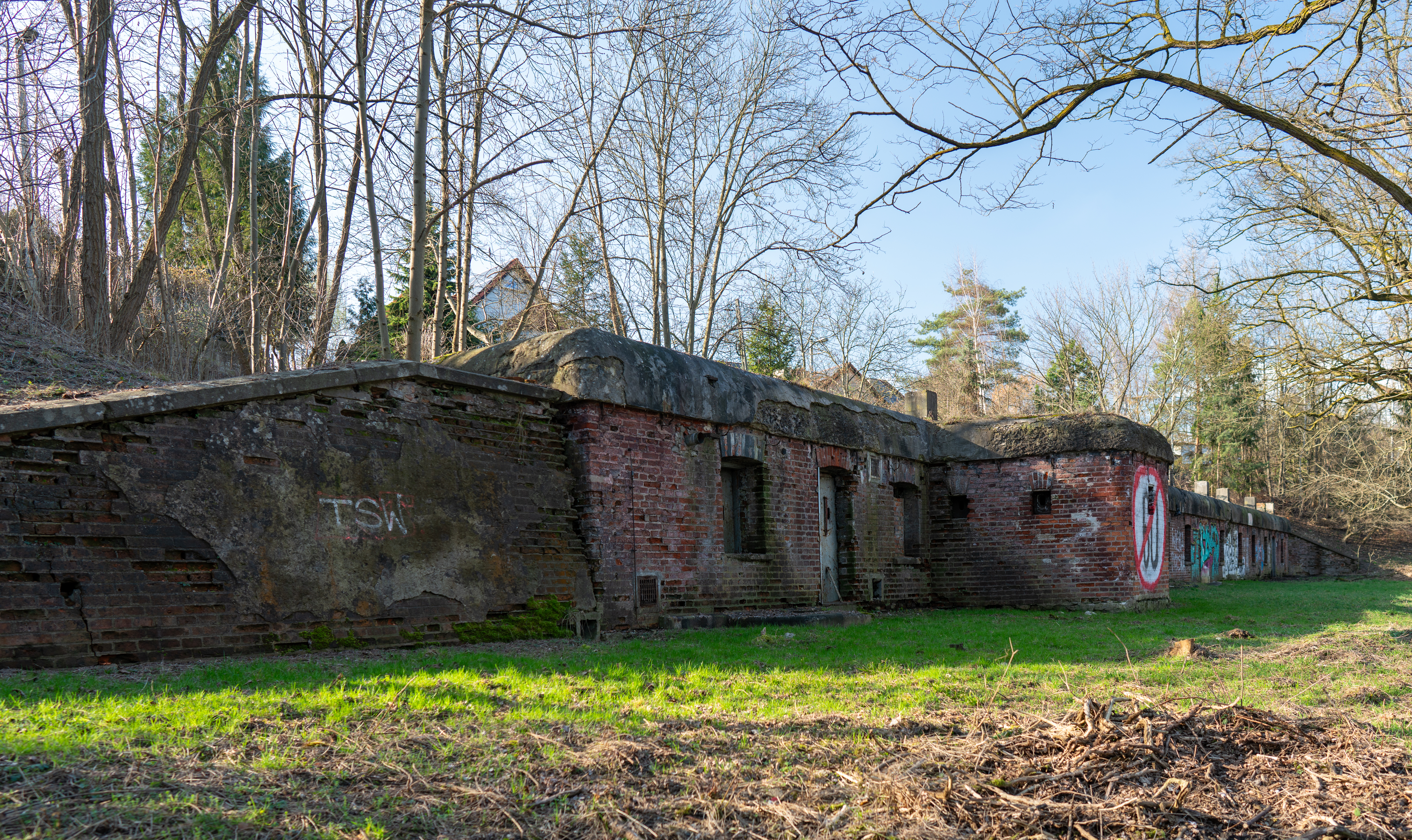
Kraków Fortress Fort Bielany
132 Księcia Józefa Street

== Bibliography ==
- (in Polish) * Praca zbiorowa Encyklopedia Krakowa, wydawca Biblioteka Kraków i Muzeum Krakowa, Kraków 2023, ISBN 978-83-66253-46-9 volume I page 119 (Encyclopedia of Krakow)
