= Kraków =

City in Poland

Kraków Cracow
- City county
- Royal Capital City of Kraków; Stołeczne Królewskie Miasto Kraków
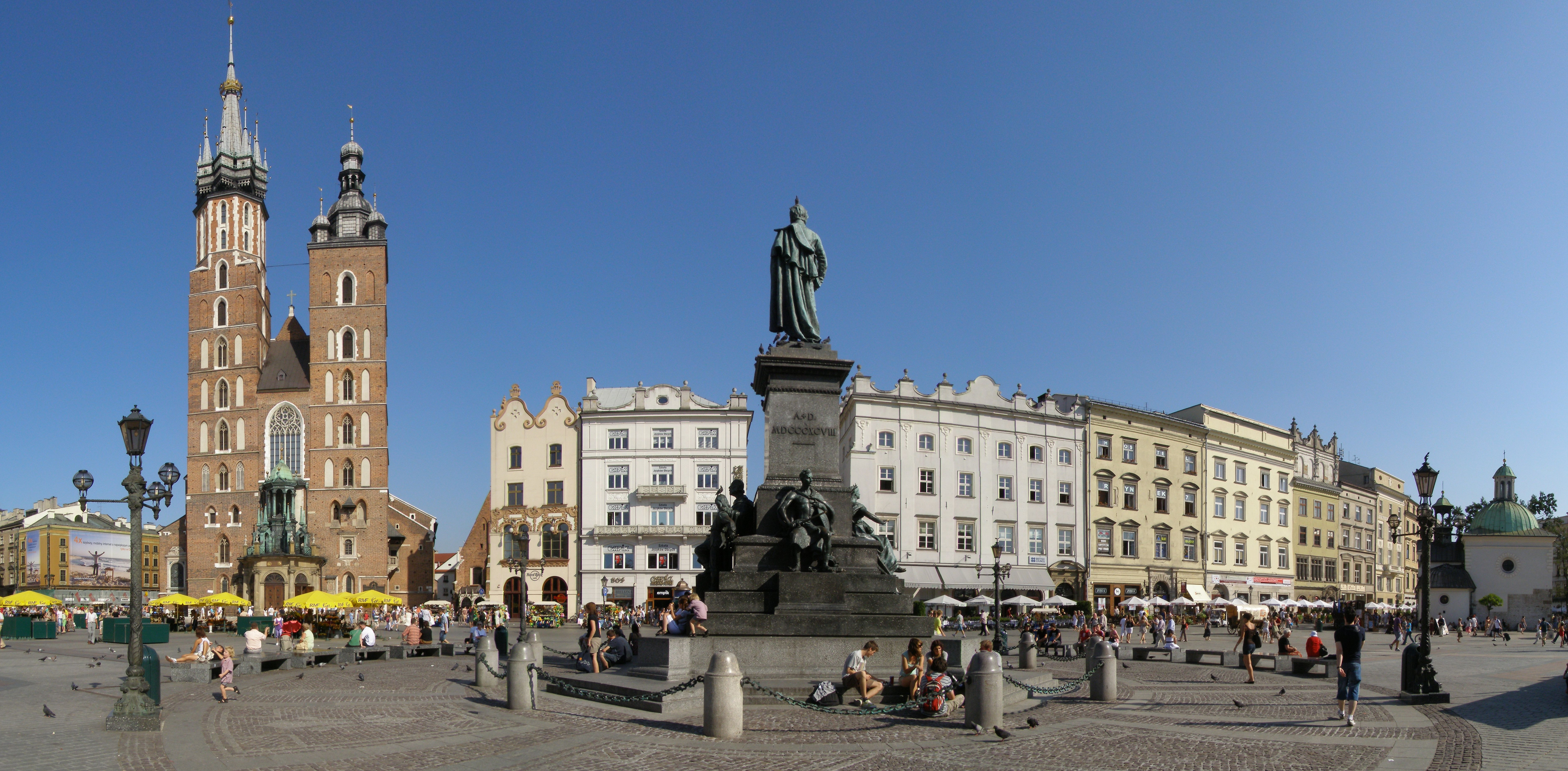
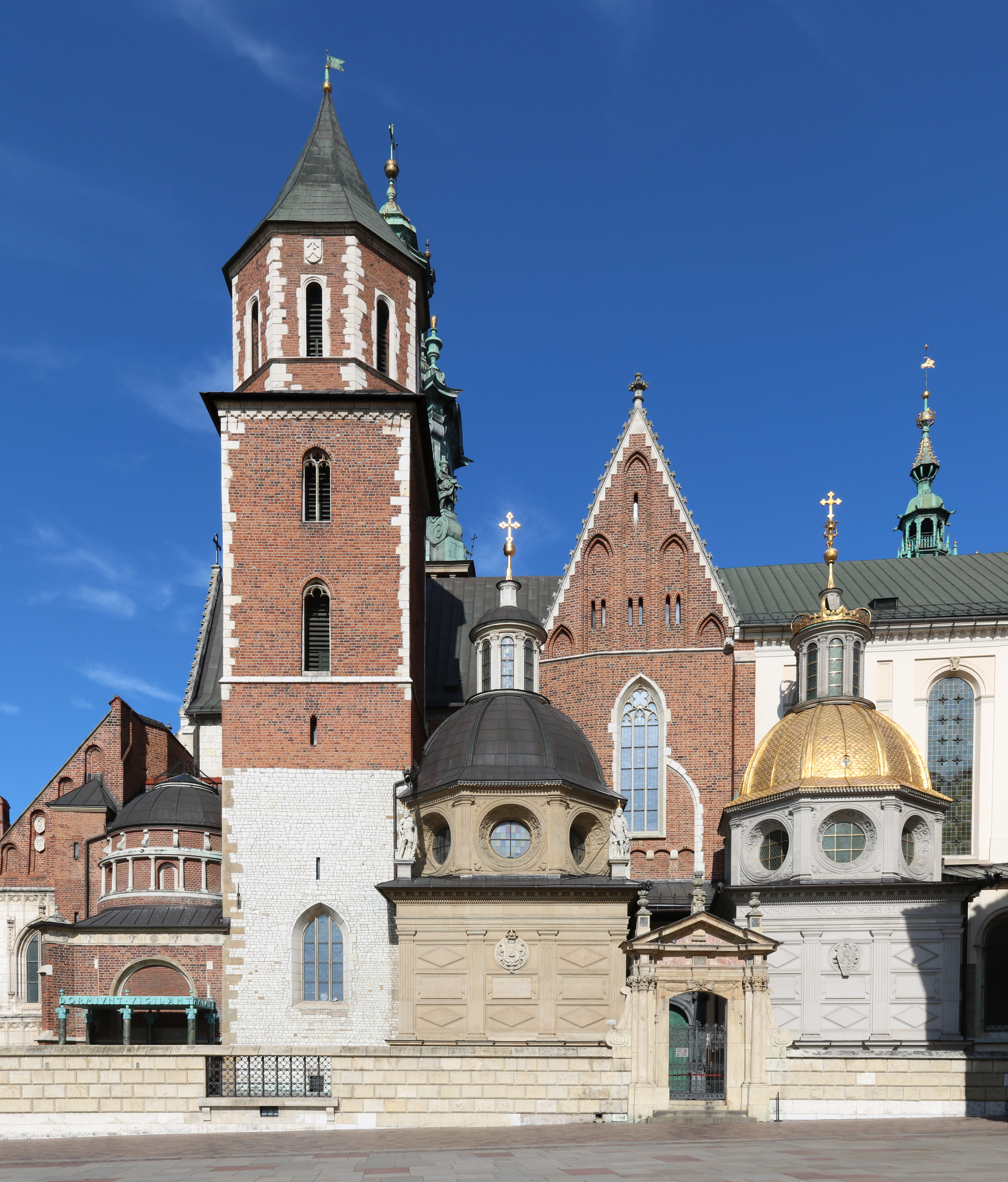
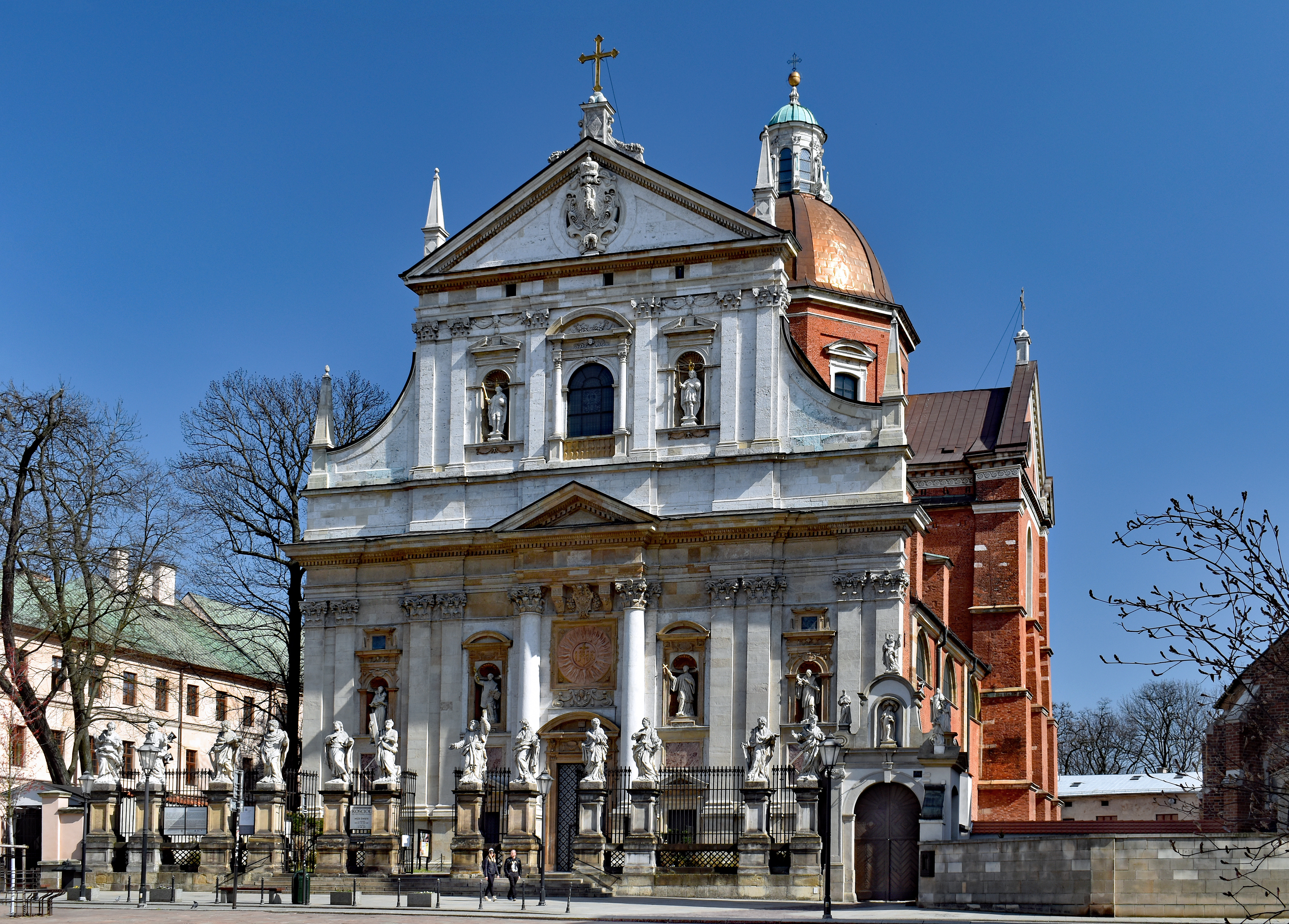
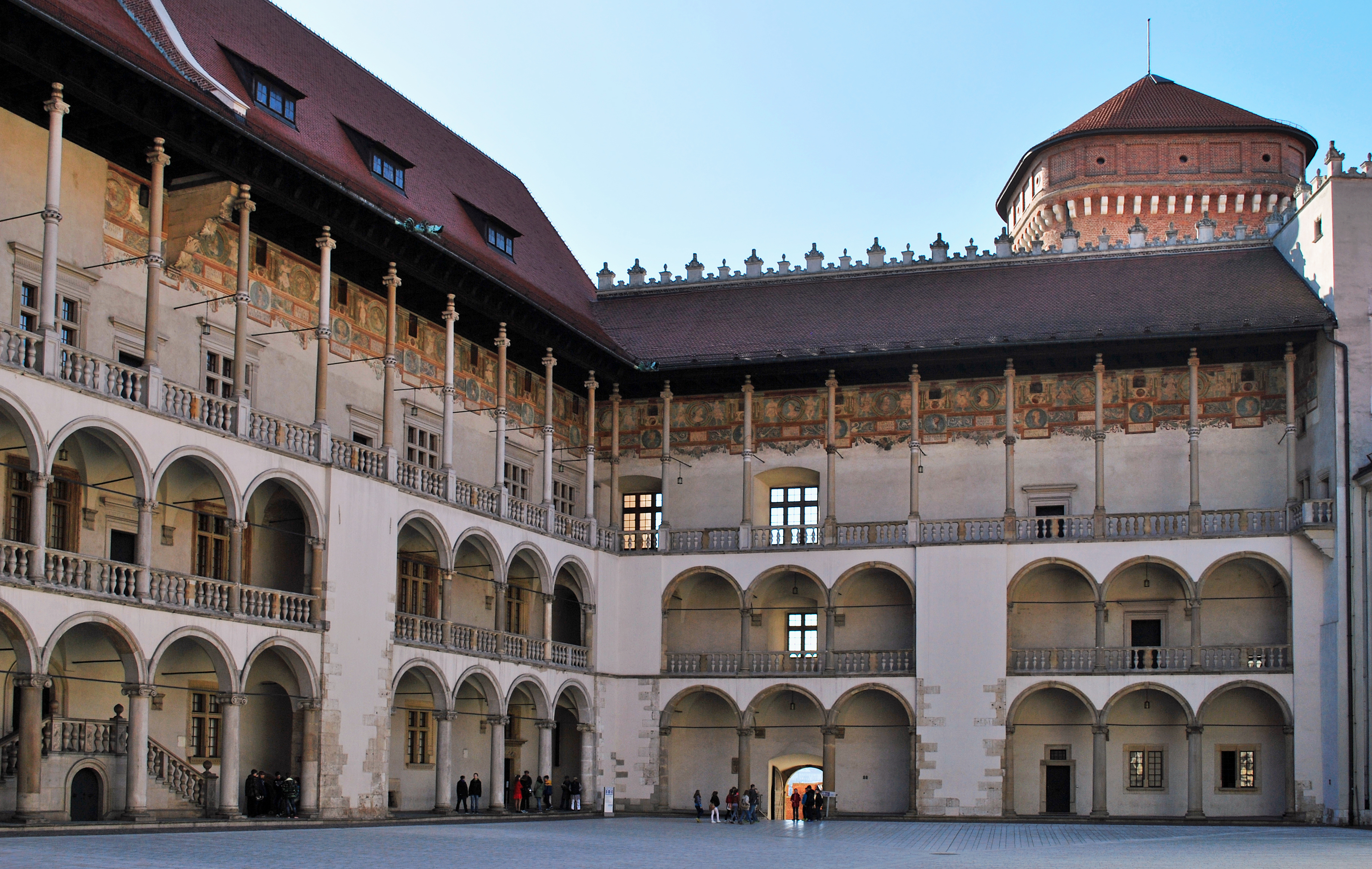
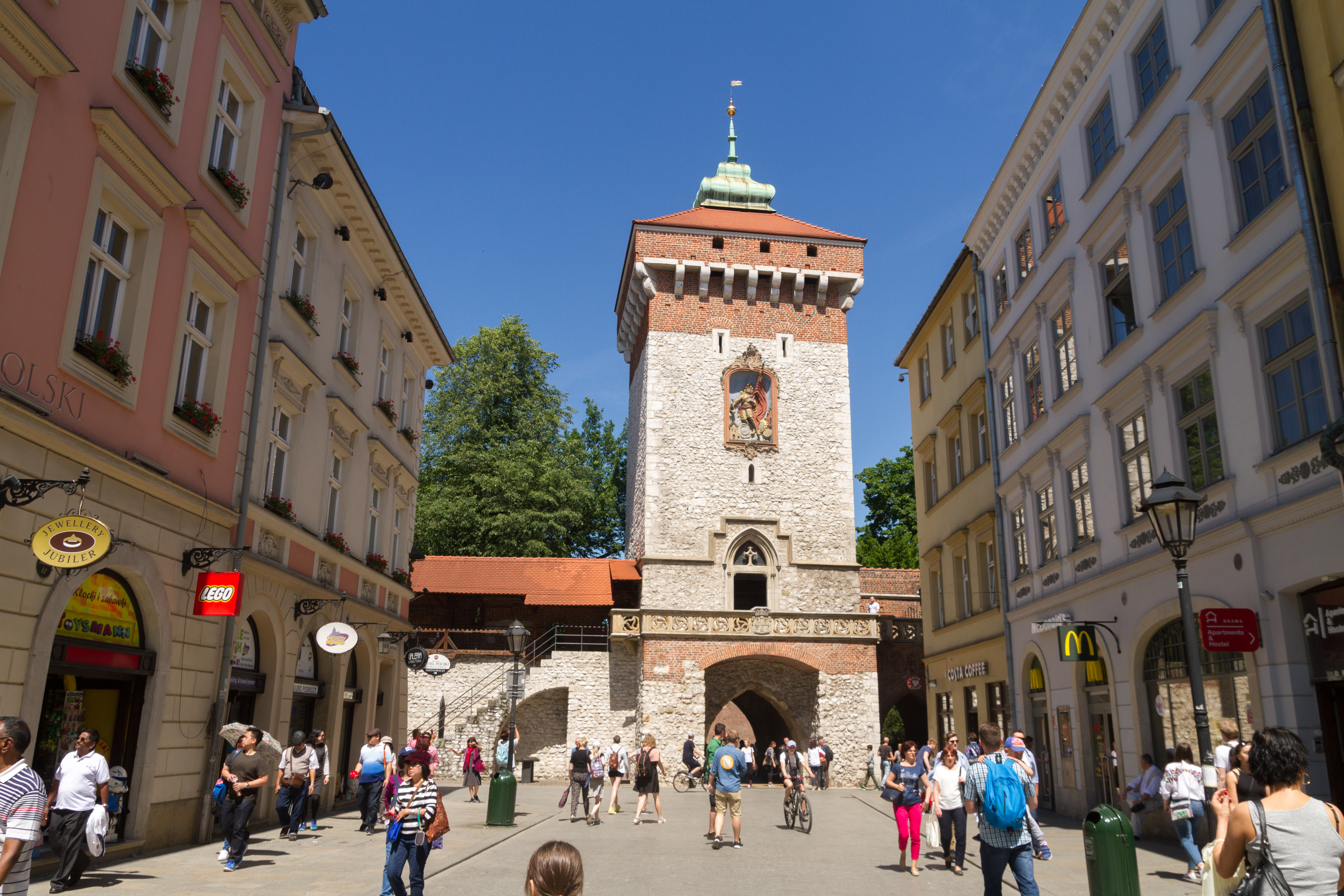
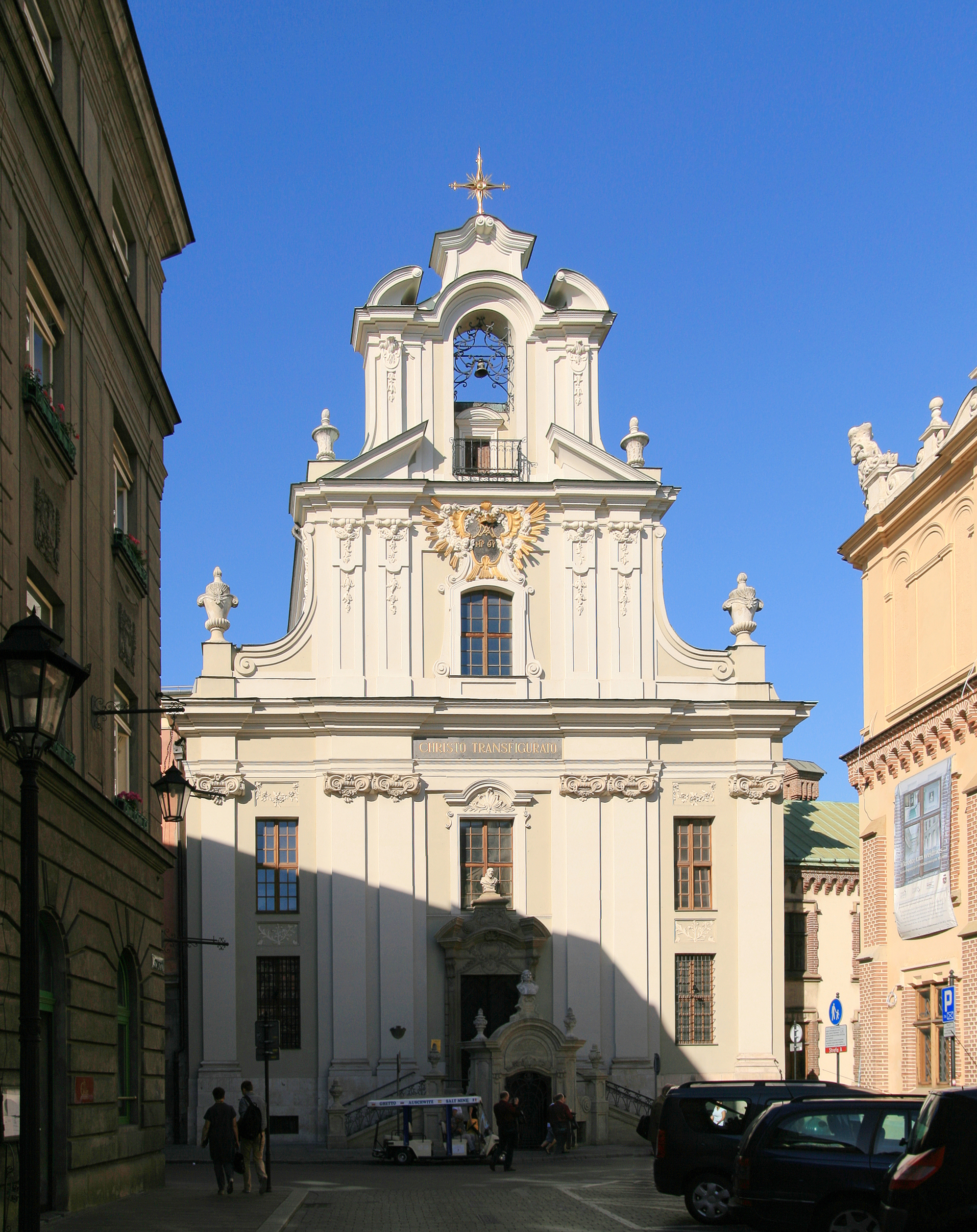
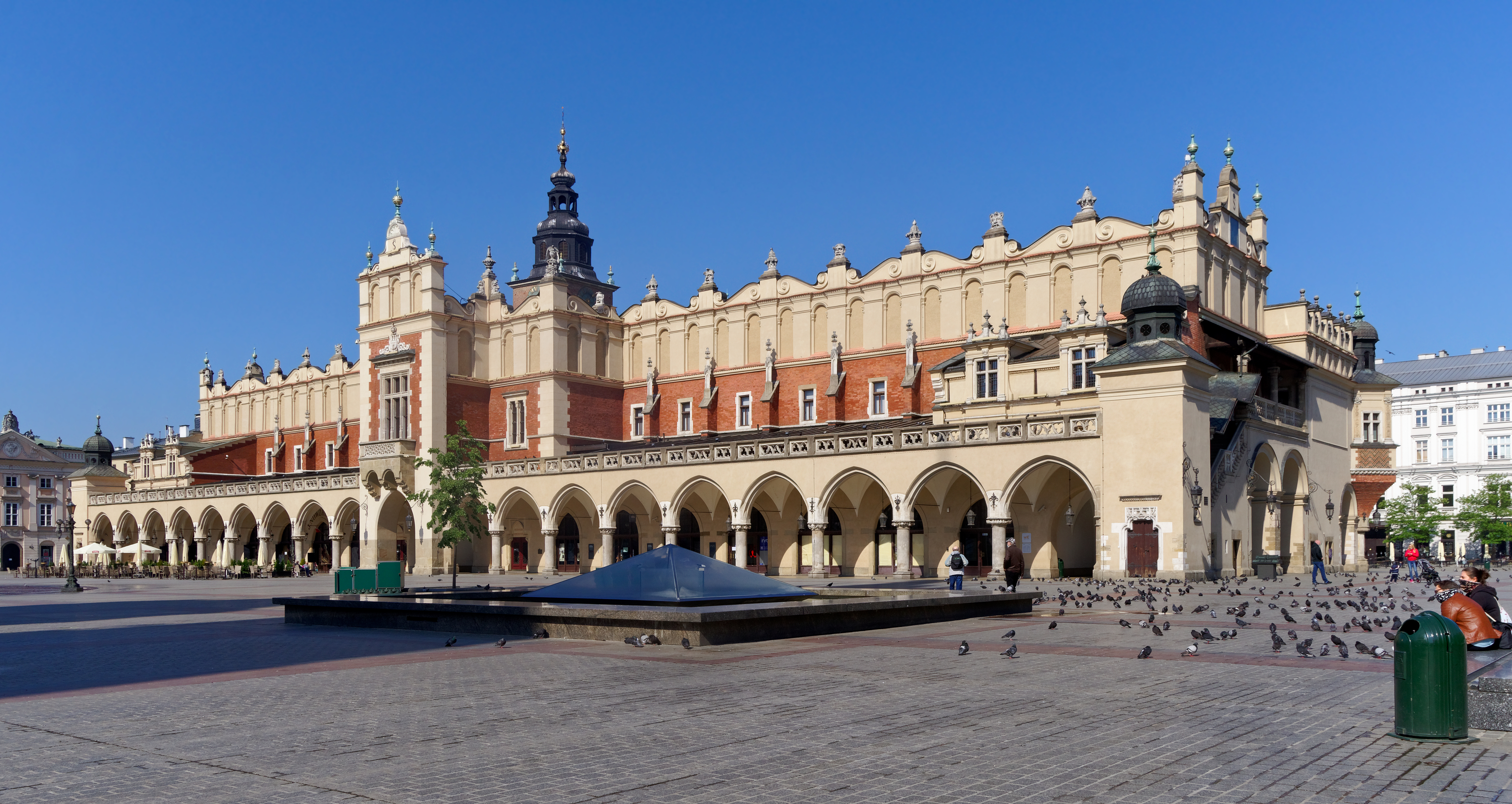
- St. Mary's Basilica, Mickiewicz Monument Cathedral Peter and Paul Church Wawel Castle Floriańska Street Piarists and Czartoryski Museum Cloth Hall (Sukiennice) and Town Hall Tower at Main Market Square (Rynek Główny)

- Flag Banner Coat of arms Brandmark
- Motto(s): Cracovia urbs celeberrima (Kraków, most magnificent city)
- Location within Poland
- Coordinates: 50°03′41″N 19°56′14″E
- Country: Poland
- Voivodeship: Lesser Poland
- City rights: 5 June 1257
- City Hall: Wielopolski Palace
- Districts: 18 districts

Government
  - Type: Mayor–council government
  - Body: Kraków City Council
  - Mayor: Łukasz Gibała (Ind.)

Area
  - City county: 326.8 km^{2} (126.2 sq mi)
  - Metro: 4,065.11 km^{2} (1,569.55 sq mi)
- Highest elevation: 383 m (1,257 ft)
- Lowest elevation: 187 m (614 ft)

Population (31 December 2025)
  - City county: 816,614 (2nd)
  - Density: 2,499/km^{2} (6,472/sq mi)
  - Metro: 1,498,499
  - Metro density: 368.624/km^{2} (954.733/sq mi)
- Demonym(s): Cracovian (en); Krakowianin (male); Krakowianka (female) (pl)

GDP
  - City: €26.227 billion (2023)
  - Metro: €28.742 billion (2021)
- Time zone: UTC+1 (CET)
  - Summer (DST): UTC+2 (CEST)
- Postal code: 30-024 to 31–963
- Area code: +48 12
- International airport: Kraków John Paul II (KRK)
- Website: www.krakow.pl

UNESCO World Heritage Site
- Official name: Historic Centre of Kraków
- Type: Cultural
- Criteria: IV
- Designated: 1978 (2nd session)
- Reference no.: 29
- UNESCO region: Europe

Kraków, (Note: English pronunciation: /ˈkrækaʊ, ˈkrækoʊ/ KRAK-ow, KRAK-oh, US also /ˈkreɪkaʊ, ˈkrɑːkaʊ/ KRAY-kow, KRAH-kow, UK also /ˈkrækɒf/ KRAK-of; Polish pronunciation: [ˈkrakuf]. Also spelled in English as Cracow, or without Polish diacritics as Krakow. Latin: Cracovia; German: Krakau, pronounced [ˈkʁaːkaʊ].) officially the Royal Capital City of Kraków, (Note: Polish: Stołeczne Królewskie Miasto Kraków.) is the second-largest and one of the oldest cities in Poland. Situated on the Vistula river in Lesser Poland Voivodeship, the city has a population of 816,614 (2025), with 1,428,363 people living in the Kraków metropolitan area. Kraków was the official capital of Poland until 1596 and has traditionally been one of the leading centres of Polish academic, cultural and artistic life. Its Old Town was declared a World Heritage Site in 1978, one of the world's first sites granted the status.

The city began as a fortified settlement on Wawel Hill around the 8th century. In 1038, it became the seat of Polish monarchs from the Piast dynasty, and subsequently served as the centre of administration under Jagiellonian kings and of the Polish–Lithuanian Commonwealth until the late 16th century, when Sigismund III Vasa transferred his royal court to Warsaw. With the emergence of the Second Polish Republic in 1918, Kraków reaffirmed its role as the nucleus of a national spirit. After the invasion of Poland, at the start of World War II, the newly defined Distrikt Krakau became the seat of Nazi Germany's General Government. The Jewish population was forced into the Kraków Ghetto, a walled zone from where they were sent to Nazi extermination camps such as the nearby Auschwitz, and Nazi concentration camps like Płaszów. However, the city was spared from destruction. In 1978, Karol Wojtyła, archbishop of Kraków, was elevated to the papacy as Pope John Paul II, the first non-Italian pope in 455 years.

The Old Town and historic centre of Kraków, along with the nearby Wieliczka Salt Mine, are Poland's first World Heritage Sites. Its extensive cultural and architectural legacy across the epochs of Gothic, Renaissance and Baroque architecture includes Wawel Cathedral and Wawel Castle on the banks of the Vistula, St Mary's Basilica, Saints Peter and Paul Church and the largest medieval market square in Europe, Rynek Główny. Kraków is home to Jagiellonian University, one of the oldest universities in the world and often considered Poland's most reputable academic institution of higher learning. The city also hosts a number of institutions of national significance, including the National Museum, Kraków Operahouse, Juliusz Słowacki Theatre, National Stary Theatre and the Jagiellonian Library.

Kraków is classified as a global city with the ranking of "high sufficiency" by the Globalization and World Cities Research Network. The city is served by John Paul II International Airport, the country's second busiest airport and the most important international airport for the inhabitants of south-eastern Poland. In 2000, Kraków was named European Capital of Culture. In 2013, Kraków was officially approved as a City of Literature. The city hosted World Youth Day in 2016, and the European Games in 2023.

== Etymology ==
The name of Kraków is traditionally derived from Krakus (Krak, Grakch), the legendary founder of Kraków and a ruler of the early Medieval tribe of Vistulans. In Polish, Kraków is an archaic possessive form of Krak and essentially means "Krak's (town)". The true origin of the name is highly disputed among historians, with many theories in existence and no unanimous consensus. The first recorded mention of Prince Krakus (then written as Grakch) dates back to 1190, although the town existed as early as the seventh century, when it was inhabited by the tribe of Vistulans. It is possible that the name of the city is derived from the word kruk, meaning 'crow' or 'raven'.

The city's full official name is Stołeczne Królewskie Miasto Kraków, which can be translated as "Royal Capital City of Kraków". In English, a person born or living in Kraków is a Cracovian (Polish: krakowianin or krakus). Until the 2000s, the English form of the name Cracow substantially led in English prevalence the recent and less-modified borrowings Krakow and Kraków. However, currently the most common variant in English text is the unmodified Kraków.

Foreign names include German and Dutch Krakau; Yiddish קראָקע (Krake); Czech and Slovak Krakov; Latin, Italian, Spanish and Romanian Cracovia; Portuguese Cracóvia; French Cracovie; Hungarian Krakkó; Lithuanian Krokuva; Ukrainian Краків (Krakiv); Russian Краков (Krakov); Arabic كركوا;/إقراقو; (Krakwā, Iqrāqū).

== History ==
=== Origins and Middle Ages ===
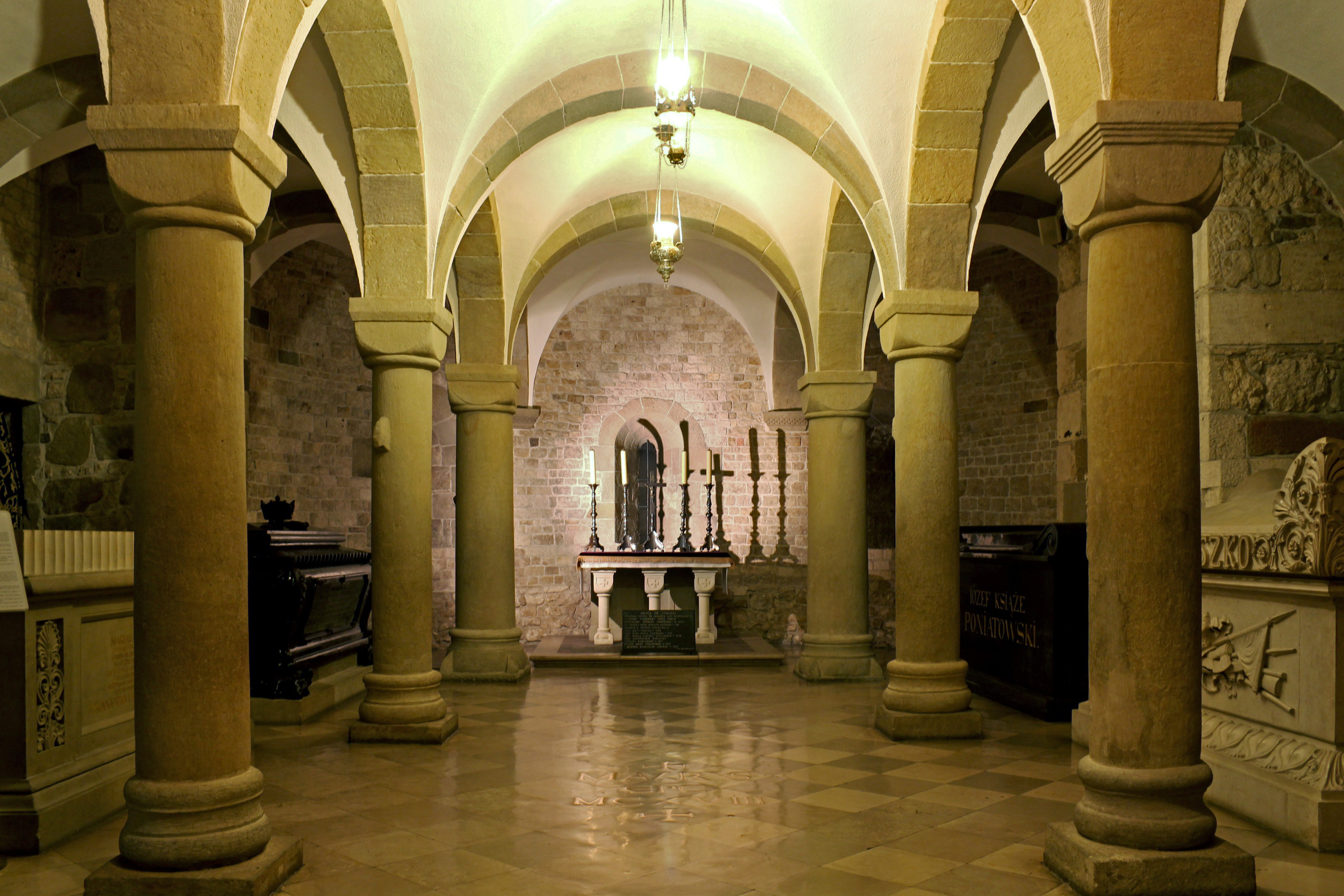
The Romanesque St Leonard's Crypt dates back to the 11th century, when Casimir I the Restorer made Kraków his royal residence and the capital of the Kingdom of Poland.

The earliest evidence human settlement in Kraków comes from the Stone Age on the present site of the Wawel Castle.

Kraków began as a fortified settlement of the Vistulans, a Lechitic tribe, around the 8th century. A legend attributes Kraków's founding to the mythical ruler Krakus, who built it above a cave occupied by a dragon, Smok Wawelski. The first written record of the city's name dates back to 965, when Kraków was described as a notable commercial centre controlled by Moravia (876–879), but captured by a Bohemian duke Boleslaus I in 955. The first acclaimed ruler of Poland, Mieszko I, took Kraków from the Bohemians and incorporated it into the holdings of the Piast dynasty towards the end of his reign.

In 1038, Kraków became the seat of the Polish government. By the end of the tenth century, the city was a leading centre of trade. Brick buildings were constructed, including the Royal Wawel Castle with St Felix and Adaukt Rotunda, Romanesque churches such as St Andrew's Church, a cathedral and a basilica. The city was sacked and burned during the Mongol invasion of 1241. It was rebuilt practically identically, based on new location act and incorporated in 1257 by the high duke Bolesław V the Chaste who following the example of Wrocław, introduced city rights modelled on the Magdeburg rights allowing for tax benefits and new trade privileges for the citizens. In 1259, the city was again ravaged by the Mongols. A third attack in 1287 was repelled thanks in part to the newly built fortifications. In 1315 a large alliance of Poland, Denmark, Norway and Sweden was formed in Kraków.

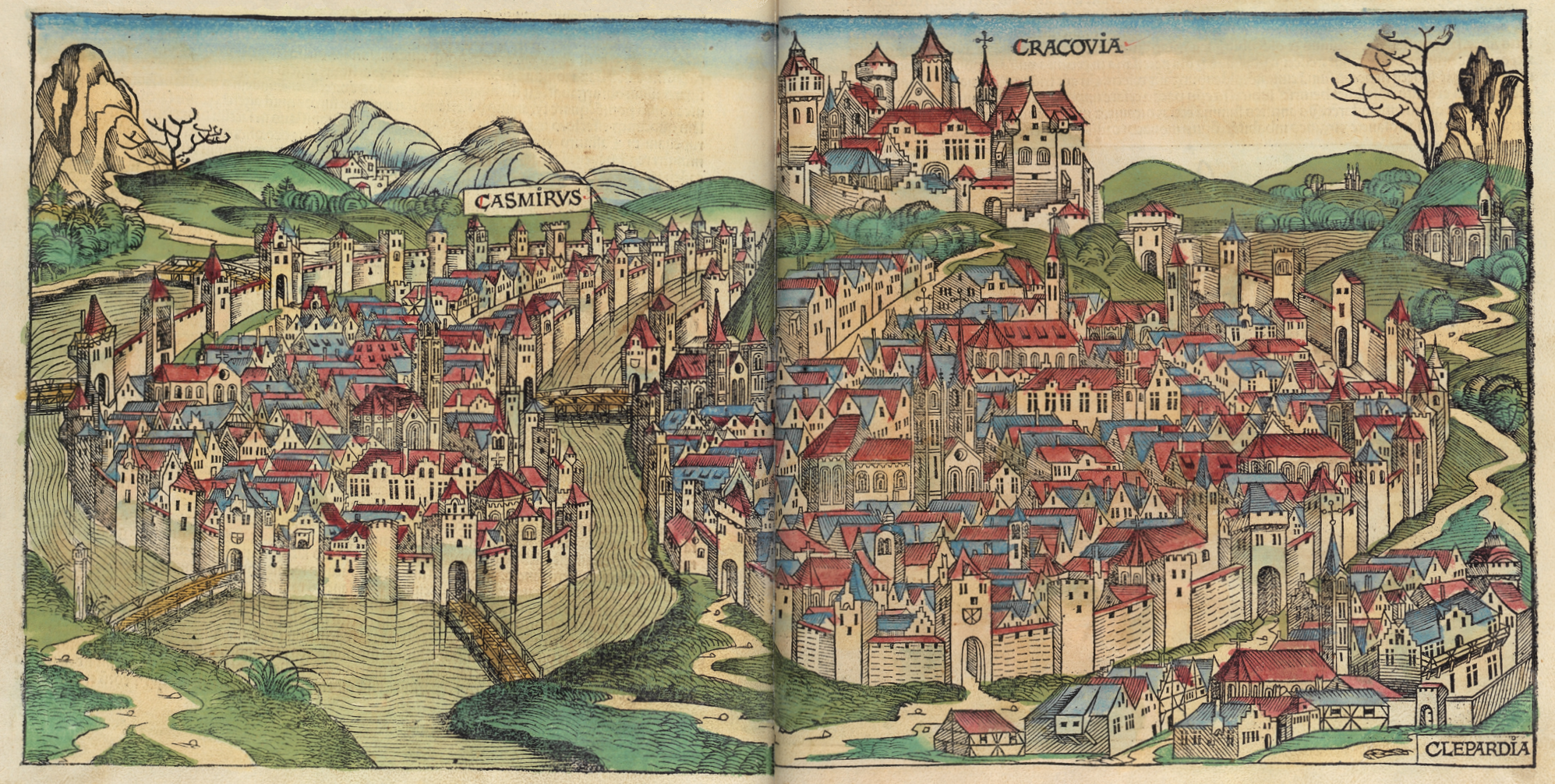
Woodcut of Kraków from the Nuremberg Chronicle, 1493

In 1335, King Casimir III the Great (Polish: Kazimierz) declared the two western suburbs to be a new city named after him, Kazimierz (Latin: Casimiria). The defensive walls were erected around the central section of Kazimierz in 1362, and a plot was set aside for the Augustinian order next to Church of St Michael the Archangel and St Stanislaus Bishop and Martyr. The city rose to prominence in 1364, when Casimir founded the Jagiellonian University, the second oldest university in central Europe after the Charles University in Prague.

The city continued to grow under the Jagiellonian dynasty. As the capital of the Kingdom of Poland and a member of the Hanseatic League, the city attracted many craftsmen from abroad, businesses, and guilds as science and the arts began to flourish. The royal chancery and the university ensured a first flourishing of Polish literary culture in the city.

=== Early modern period ===
The 15th and 16th centuries were known as Poland's Złoty Wiek or Golden Age. Many works of Polish Renaissance art and architecture were created, including synagogues in Kraków's Jewish quarter located in the north-eastern part of Kazimierz, such as the Old Synagogue. During the reign of Casimir IV, various artists came to work and live in Kraków, and Johann Haller established a printing press in the city after Kasper Straube had printed the Calendarium Cracoviense, the first work printed in Poland, in 1473.

In 1520, the most famous church bell in Poland, named Zygmunt after Sigismund I the Old, was cast by Hans Behem. At that time, Hans Dürer, a younger brother of artist and thinker Albrecht Dürer, was Sigismund's court painter. Hans von Kulmbach made altarpieces for several churches. In 1553, the Kazimierz district council gave the Jewish Qahal (council of a Jewish self-governing community) a licence for the right to build their own interior walls across the western section of the already existing defensive walls. The walls were expanded again in 1608 due to the growth of the community and influx of Jews from Bohemia. In 1572, King Sigismund II Augustus, the last of the Jagiellons, died childless. The Polish throne passed to Henry III of France and then to other foreign-based rulers in rapid succession, causing a decline in the city's importance. Furthermore, in 1596, Sigismund III Vasa of the House of Vasa moved the administrative capital of the Polish–Lithuanian Commonwealth from Kraków to Warsaw. The city was destabilised by pillaging in the 1650s during the Swedish invasion, especially during the 1655 siege. Later in 1707, the city underwent an outbreak of bubonic plague that left 20,000 of the city's residents dead.

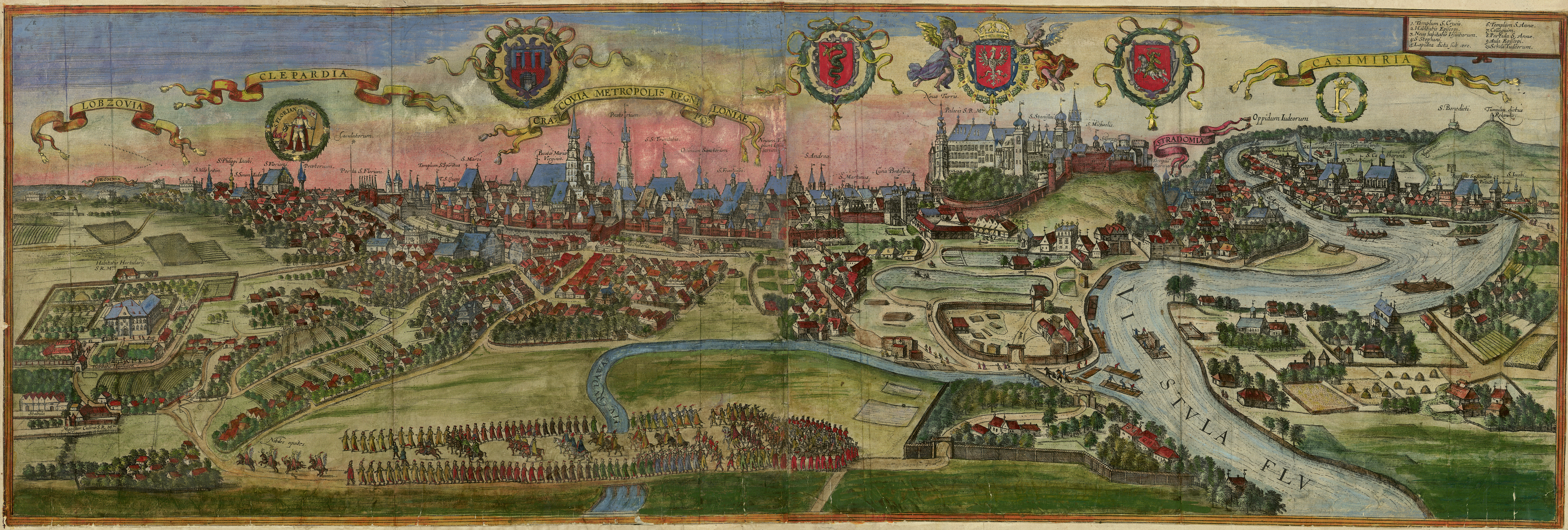
View of Kraków (Cracovia) near the end of the 16th century

=== 19th century ===
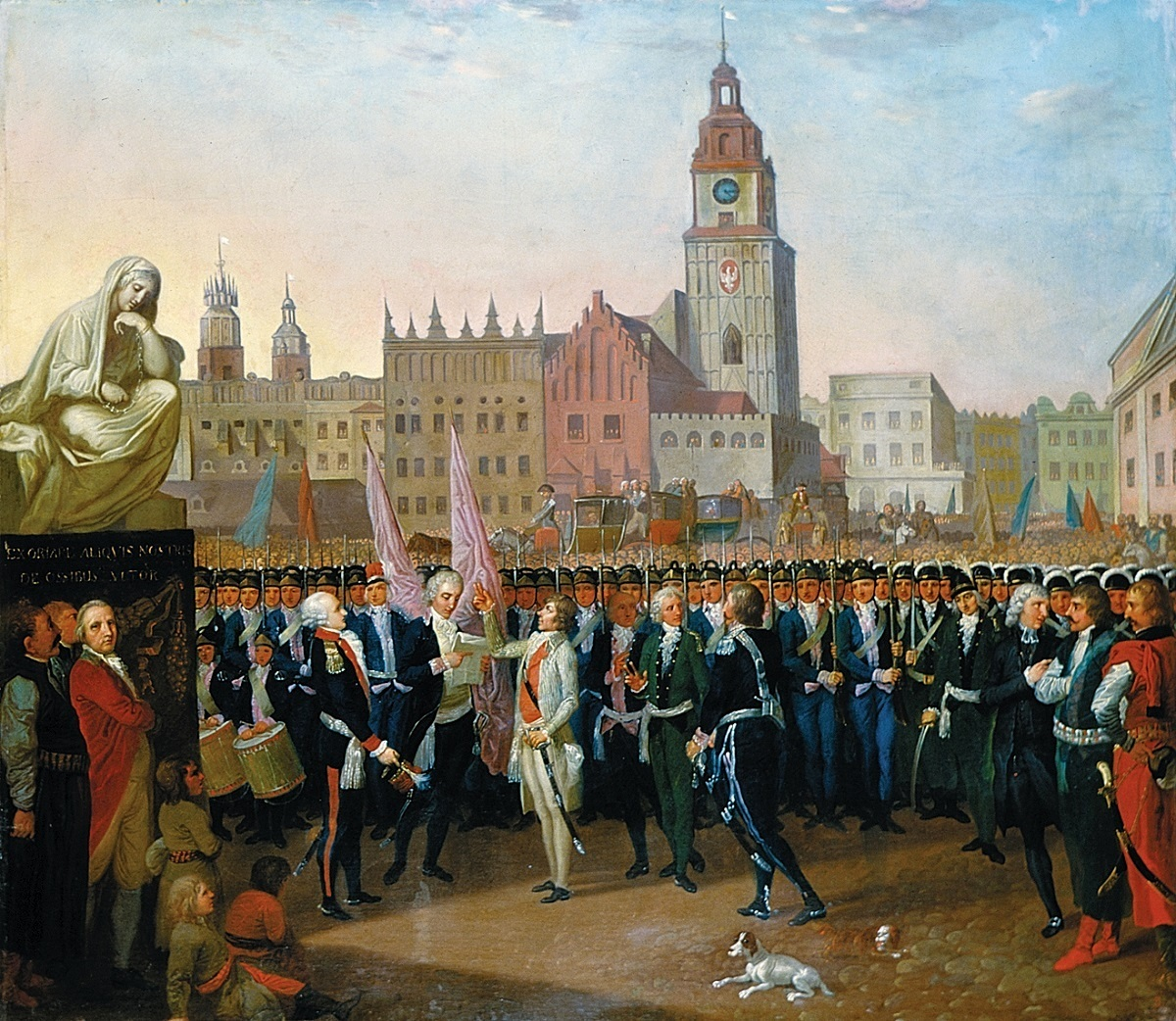
Tadeusz Kościuszko taking the oath of loyalty to the Polish nation in Kraków's market square (Rynek), 1794

Already weakened during the 18th century, by the mid-1790s the Polish–Lithuanian Commonwealth had twice been partitioned by its neighbours: Russian Empire, the Habsburg monarchy and Kingdom of Prussia. In 1791, the Holy Roman Emperor Leopold II changed the status of Kazimierz as a separate city and made it into a district of Kraków. The richer Jewish families began to move out. However, because of the injunction against travel on the Sabbath, most Jewish families stayed relatively close to the historic synagogues. In 1794, Tadeusz Kościuszko initiated an unsuccessful insurrection in the town's Main Square which, in spite of his victorious Battle of Racławice against a numerically superior Imperial Russian Army, resulted in the third and final partition of Poland. As a result, Kraków fell under Habsburg rule.

In 1802, German became the town's official language. Of the members appointed by the Habsburgs to the municipal council only half were Polish. From 1796 to 1809, the population of the city rose from 22,000 to 26,000 with an increasing percentage of nobles and officials. In 1809, Napoleon captured former Polish territories from Austria and made the town part of the Duchy of Warsaw. During the time of the Duchy of Warsaw, requirements to upkeep the Polish army followed by tours of Austrian, Polish and Russian troops, plus Russian occupation and a flood in the year 1813 all added up to the adverse development of the city with a high debt burden on public finances and many workshops and trading houses needing to close their activities.

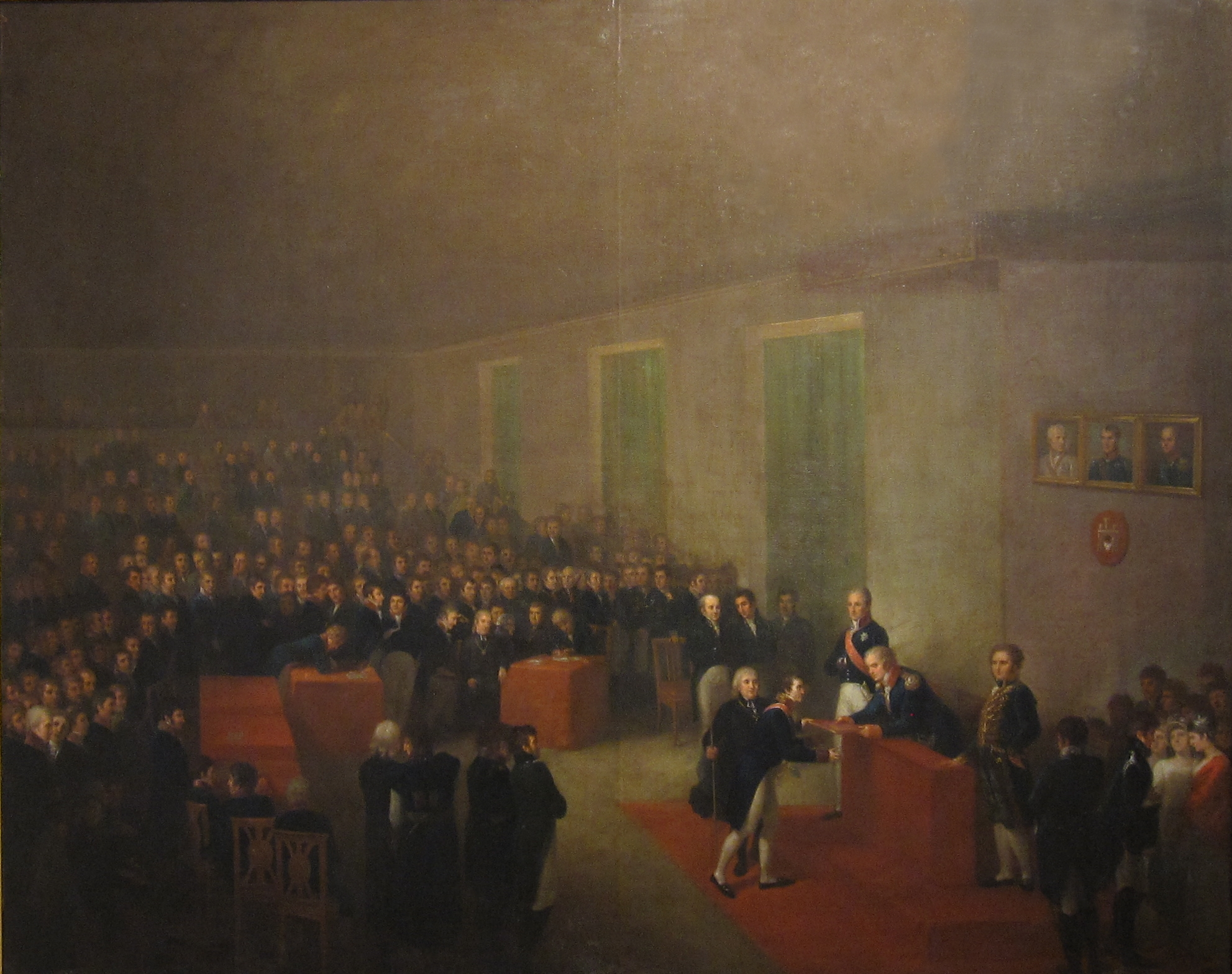
Act of granting the constitution to the Free City of Cracow. After the Partitions of Poland, Kraków became a city-state and remained the only piece of sovereign Polish territory between 1815 and 1846.

Following Napoleon's defeat, the 1815 Congress of Vienna restored the pre-war boundaries but also created the partially independent and neutral Free City of Cracow. In addition to the historic city of Kraków itself, the Free City included the towns of Chrzanów, Trzebinia and Nowa Góra and 224 villages. Outside the city, mining and metallurgy started developing. The population of Kraków itself grew in this time from 23,000 to 43,000; that of the overall republic from 88,000 to 103,000. The population of the city had an increasing number of Catholic clergy, officials and intelligentsia with which the rich townspeople sympathised. They were opposed to the conservative landed nobility who also were drawn more and more to the city real estates even though their income still mainly came from their agricultural possessions in the Republic, the Kingdom of Poland and Galicia. The percentage of the Jewish population in the city also increased in this time from 20.8% to 30.4%. However, nationalist sentiment and other political issues led to instability; this culminated in the Kraków Uprising of 1846, which was crushed by the Austrian authorities. The Free City was therefore annexed into the Austrian Empire as the Grand Duchy of Kraków (Polish: Wielkie Księstwo Krakowskie, German: Großherzogtum Krakau), which was legally separate from but administratively part of the Kingdom of Galicia and Lodomeria (more simply Austrian Galicia).

During the era of the free city, a free-trade zone led to positive economic development. But because of the unstable political situation and insecurity about the future, not much of the accumulated wealth was invested. Through the increase of taxes, customs and regulations, prices soared and the city fell into a recession. From 1844 to 1850 the population was diminished by over 4,000 inhabitants.

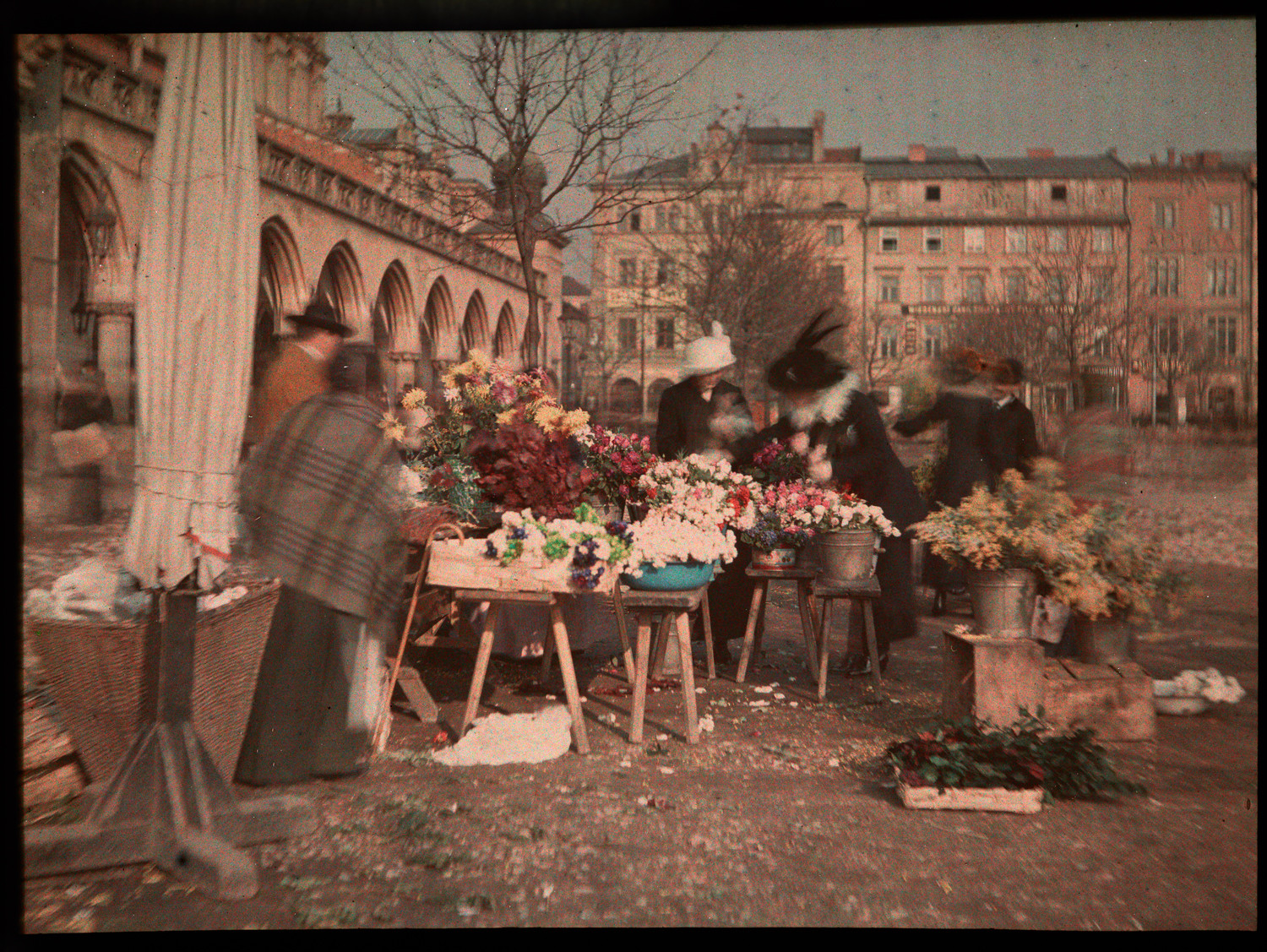
Flower vendors in Rynek—the first autochrome in Poland, dated 1915

In 1866, Austria granted a degree of autonomy to Galicia after its own defeat in the Austro-Prussian War. Kraków, being politically freer than the Polish cities under Prussian (later German) and Russian rule, became a Polish national symbol and a centre of culture and art, known frequently as the "Polish Athens" (Polskie Ateny). Many leading Polish artists of the period resided in Kraków, among them the seminal painter Jan Matejko, laid to rest at Rakowicki Cemetery, and the founder of modern Polish drama, Stanisław Wyspiański. Fin de siècle Kraków evolved into a modern metropolis; running water and electric streetcars were introduced in 1901, and between 1910 and 1915, Kraków and its surrounding suburban communities were gradually combined into a single administrative unit called Greater Kraków (Wielki Kraków).

At the outbreak of World War I on 3 August 1914, Józef Piłsudski formed a small cadre military unit, the First Cadre Company—the predecessor of the Polish Legions—which set out from Kraków to fight for the liberation of Poland. The city was briefly besieged by Russian troops in November 1914. Austrian rule in Kraków ended in 1918 when the Polish Liquidation Committee assumed power.

=== 20th century to the present ===
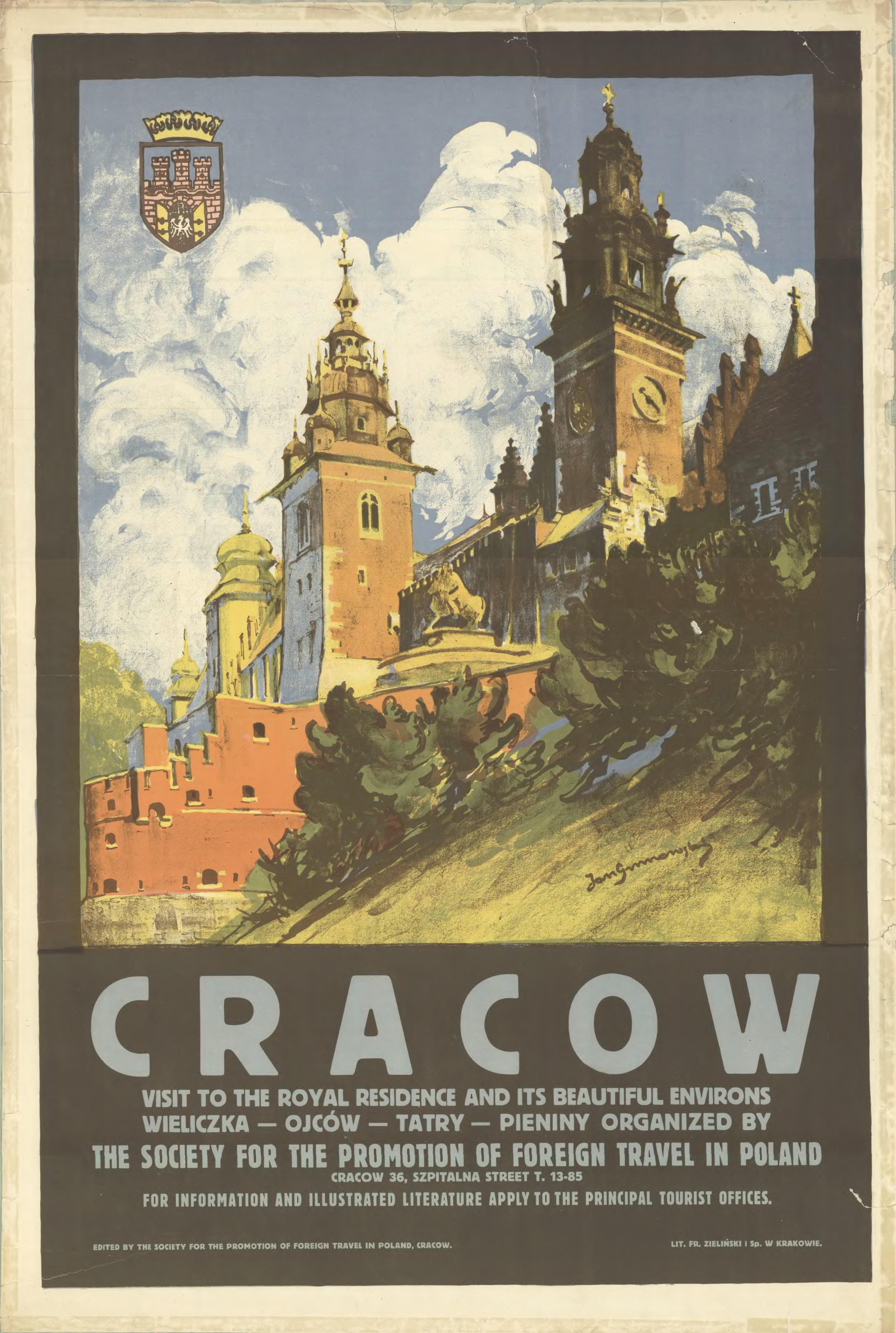
A vintage English language travel poster promoting tourism to Kraków, 1931

Following the emergence of the Second Polish Republic in 1918, Kraków resumed its role as a major Polish academic and cultural centre, with the establishment of new universities such as the AGH University of Science and Technology and the Jan Matejko Academy of Fine Arts, as well as several new and essential vocational schools. The city became an important cultural centre for Polish Jews, including both Zionist and Bundist groups. Kraków was also an influential centre of Jewish spiritual life, with all its manifestations of religious observance—from Orthodox to Hasidic and Reform Judaism—flourishing side by side.

Following the invasion of Poland by Nazi Germany in September 1939, the city of Kraków became part of the General Government, a separate administrative region of the Third Reich. On 26 October 1939, the Nazi régime set up Distrikt Krakau, one of four districts within the General Government. On the same day, the city of Kraków became the capital of the administration. The General Government was ruled by Governor-General Hans Frank, who was based in the city's Wawel Castle. The Nazis envisioned turning Kraków into a completely Germanised city; after removal of all Jews and Poles, renaming of locations and streets into the German language, and sponsorship of propaganda portraying the city as historically German. On 28 November 1939, Frank set up Judenräte ('Jewish Councils') to be run by Jewish citizens for the purpose of carrying out orders for the Nazis. These orders included the registration of all Jewish people living in each area, the collection of taxes, and the formation of forced-labour groups. The Polish Home Army maintained a parallel underground administrative system.

At the outbreak of World War II, some 56,000 Jews resided in Kraków—almost one-quarter of a total population of about 250,000; by November 1939, the Jewish population of the city had grown to approximately 70,000. According to German statistics from 1940, over 200,000 Jews lived within the entire Kraków District, comprising more than 5 percent of the district's total population. However, these statistics probably underestimate the situation. In November 1939, during an operation known as Sonderaktion Krakau ('special operation Kraków'), the Germans arrested more than 180 university professors and academics, and sent them to the Sachsenhausen and Dachau concentration camps, though the survivors were later released on the request of prominent Italians.

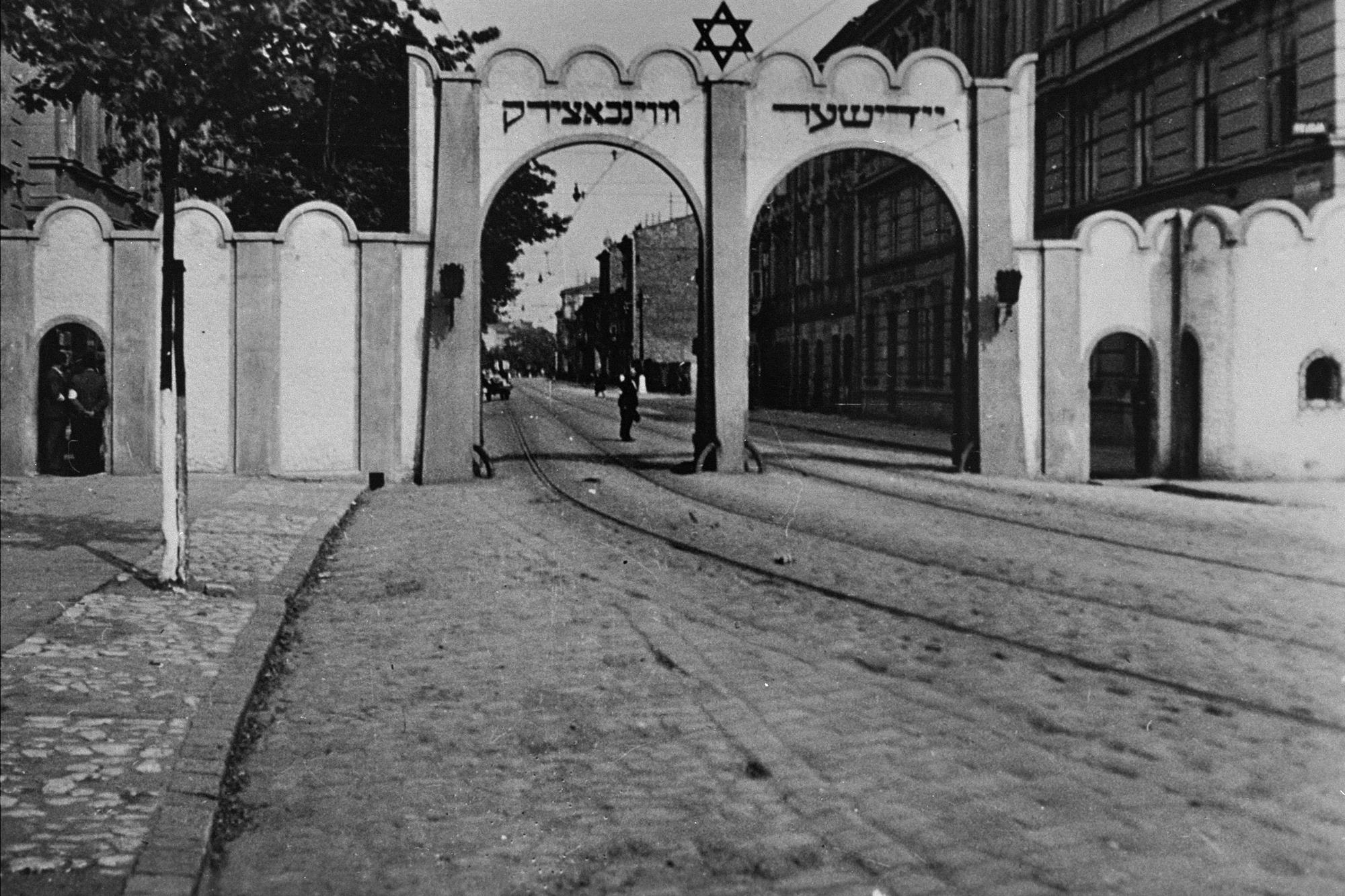
The Kraków Ghetto was set up in 1941 by the occupational German Nazi General Government.

Before the formation of ghettos, which began in the Kraków District in December 1939, Jews were encouraged to flee the city. For those who remained, the German authorities decided in March 1941 to allocate a then-suburban neighbourhood, Podgórze, to become Kraków's ghetto, where many Jews subsequently died of illness or starvation. Initially, most ghettos were open and Jews were allowed to enter and exit freely, but as security became tighter the ghettos were generally closed. From autumn 1941, the SS developed the policy of extermination through labour, which further worsened the already bleak conditions for Jews. The inhabitants of the Kraków Ghetto were later murdered or sent to German extermination camps, including Bełżec and Auschwitz, and to Kraków-Płaszów concentration camp. The largest deportations within the Distrikt occurred from June to September 1942. More specifically, mass deportation from Kraków's ghetto occurred in the first week of June 1942, and the ghetto was finally liquidated in March 1943.

The film director Roman Polanski survived the Kraków Ghetto. Oskar Schindler selected employees from the ghetto to work in his enamelware factory Deutsche Emailwarenfabrik, saving them from the camps. Similarly, many men capable of physical labor were saved from deportation to extermination camps and instead sent to labor camps across the General Government. By September 1943, the last of the Jews from the Kraków Ghetto had been deported. Although looted by occupational authorities, Kraków remained relatively undamaged at the end of World War II, with most of the city's historical and architectural legacy spared. Soviet forces under the command of Marshal Ivan Konev entered the city on 18 January 1945 and began arresting Poles loyal to the Polish government-in-exile or those who had served in the Home Army.

Kraków's territorial growth from the late 18th to the 20th century

After the war, under the Polish People's Republic (officially declared in 1952), the intellectual and academic community of Kraków came under complete political control. The universities were soon deprived of their printing rights and autonomy. The Stalinist government of Poland ordered the construction of the country's largest steel mill in the newly created suburb of Nowa Huta. The creation of the giant Lenin Steelworks (now Sendzimir Steelworks owned by Mittal) sealed Kraków's transformation from a university city into an industrial centre.

In an effort that spanned two decades, Karol Wojtyła, the cardinal archbishop of Kraków from 1964 to 1978, successfully lobbied for permission to build the first churches in the newly industrialised suburbs. In 1978, the Catholic Church elevated Wojtyła to the papacy as John Paul II, the first non-Italian pope in over 450 years. In the same year, UNESCO, following the application of local authorities, placed Kraków Old Town on the first list of World Heritage Sites.

== Geography ==
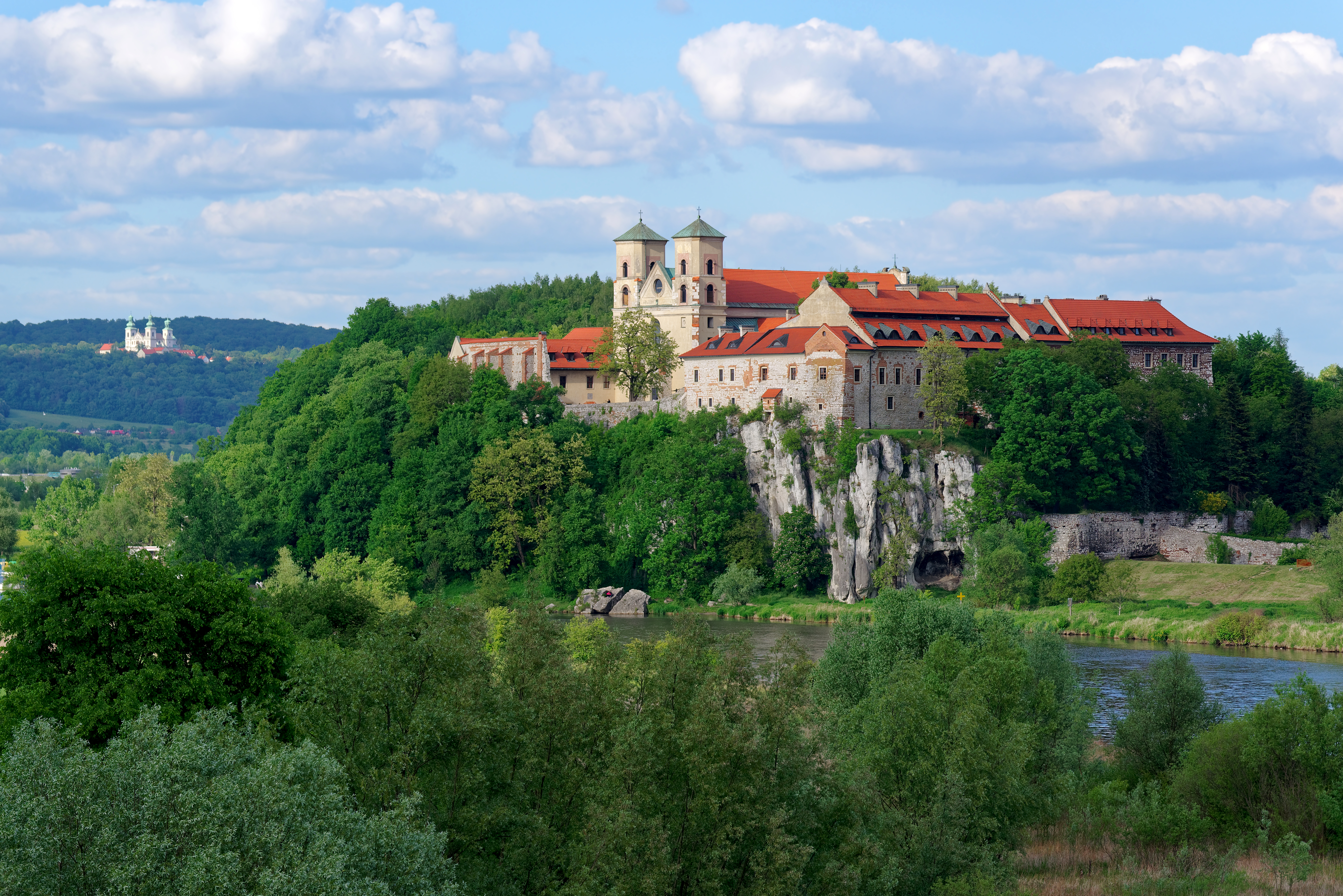
Tyniec Abbey with the Bielany Camaldolese Hermit Monastery in the distance

Kraków lies in the southern part of Poland, on the Vistula River, approximately 219 m (719 ft) above sea level. The city is located on the border between different physiographic regions: the Kraków-Częstochowa Upland in the north-western parts of the city, the Małopolska Upland in the north-east, the Sandomierz Basin (east) and the Western Beskidian Foothills of the Carpathians (south).

There are five nature reserves in Kraków, with a combined area of ca. 48.6 hectares (120 acres). Due to their ecological value, these areas are legally protected. The western part of the city, along its northern and north-western side, borders an area of international significance known as the Jurassic Bielany-Tyniec refuge. The main motives for the protection of this area include plant and animal wildlife and the area's geomorphological features and landscape. Another part of the city is located within the ecological 'corridor' of the Vistula River valley. This corridor is also assessed as being of international significance as part of the Pan-European ecological network.

=== Climate ===
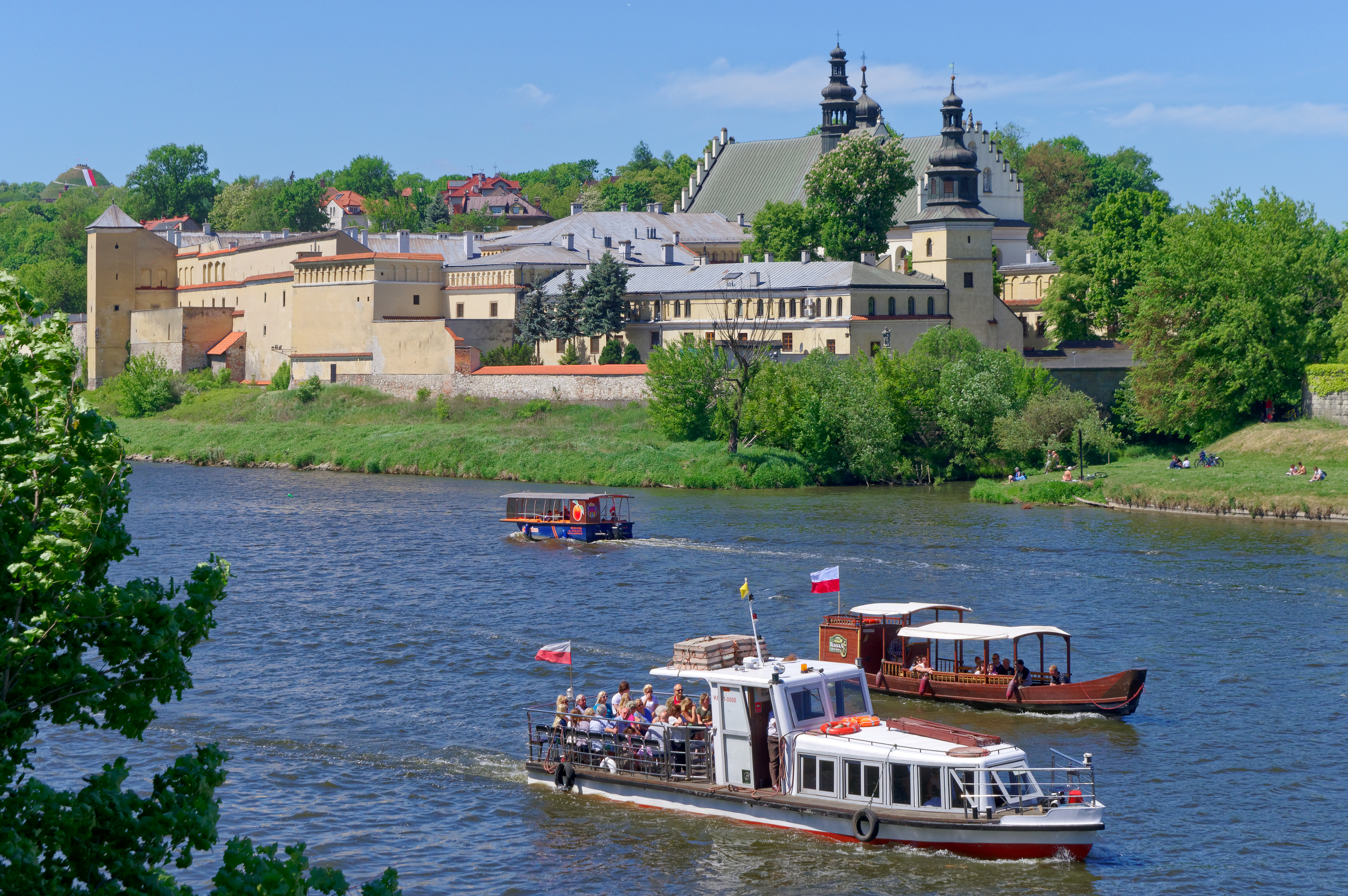
Convent of Norbertine Sisters in Kraków-Zwierzyniec and the Vistula River during the summer season

Kraków has a humid continental climate, denoted by Köppen classification as Dfb, somewhat bordering on an oceanic climate (Cfb); with climate change winters are rapidly becoming milder and summers longer and hotter more like humid subtropical climate (Cfa), hot summers days above 30C are increasingly common, but with winter temperatures on average still below freezing, it is perhaps best defined as having a semicontinental climate. In older reference periods it was classified as a warm summer continental climate (Dfb). By classification of Wincenty Okołowicz, it has a warm temperate climate in the centre of continental Europe with the "fusion" of different features.

Due to its geographic location, the city may be under marine influence, sometimes Arctic influence, but without direct influence, giving the city variable meteorological conditions over short spaces of time. The city lies in proximity to the Tatra Mountains and there are often occurrences of a foehn wind called halny, causing temperatures to rise rapidly. In relation to Warsaw, temperatures are very similar for most of the year, except that in the colder months southern Poland has a larger daily temperature range, more moderate winds, generally more rainy days and with greater chances of clear skies on average, especially in winter. The higher sun angle also allows for a longer growing season. In addition, for older data there was less sun than the capital of the country, about 30 minutes daily per year, but both have small differences in relative humidity and the direction of the winds is northeast.

Climate data for Kraków-Observatory, 1991–2020 normals, extremes 1951–present
Month	Jan	Feb	Mar	Apr	May	Jun	Jul	Aug	Sep	Oct	Nov	Dec	Year
Record high °C (°F)	17.3 (63.1)	21.0 (69.8)	24.7 (76.5)	31.2 (88.2)	33.7 (92.7)	36.0 (96.8)	36.7 (98.1)	38.3 (100.9)	35.8 (96.4)	27.9 (82.2)	24.0 (75.2)	19.9 (67.8)	38.3 (100.9)
Mean maximum °C (°F)	10.9 (51.6)	13.3 (55.9)	18.9 (66.0)	25.3 (77.5)	28.9 (84.0)	32.1 (89.8)	33.4 (92.1)	33.2 (91.8)	28.4 (83.1)	24.4 (75.9)	17.8 (64.0)	11.6 (52.9)	34.7 (94.5)
Mean daily maximum °C (°F)	2.3 (36.1)	4.4 (39.9)	9.1 (48.4)	15.8 (60.4)	20.6 (69.1)	24.0 (75.2)	26.0 (78.8)	25.8 (78.4)	20.2 (68.4)	14.6 (58.3)	8.2 (46.8)	3.3 (37.9)	14.5 (58.1)
Daily mean °C (°F)	−1.0 (30.2)	0.4 (32.7)	4.1 (39.4)	9.8 (49.6)	14.6 (58.3)	18.3 (64.9)	20.0 (68.0)	19.3 (66.7)	14.2 (57.6)	9.2 (48.6)	4.4 (39.9)	0.2 (32.4)	9.5 (49.1)
Mean daily minimum °C (°F)	−3.5 (25.7)	−2.6 (27.3)	0.3 (32.5)	4.8 (40.6)	9.5 (49.1)	13.2 (55.8)	14.9 (58.8)	14.4 (57.9)	10.1 (50.2)	5.7 (42.3)	1.7 (35.1)	−2.2 (28.0)	5.5 (41.9)
Mean minimum °C (°F)	−14.0 (6.8)	−11.4 (11.5)	−6.4 (20.5)	−1.6 (29.1)	3.0 (37.4)	8.1 (46.6)	9.9 (49.8)	9.2 (48.6)	3.8 (38.8)	−1.8 (28.8)	−5.8 (21.6)	−11.6 (11.1)	−16.4 (2.5)
Record low °C (°F)	−26.1 (−15.0)	−26.8 (−16.2)	−23.2 (−9.8)	−4.6 (23.7)	−1.8 (28.8)	2.3 (36.1)	6.6 (43.9)	4.5 (40.1)	−2.6 (27.3)	−5.7 (21.7)	−16.1 (3.0)	−25.7 (−14.3)	−26.8 (−16.2)
Average precipitation mm (inches)	37.9 (1.49)	33.3 (1.31)	38.3 (1.51)	48.4 (1.91)	82.6 (3.25)	81.1 (3.19)	98.6 (3.88)	75.1 (2.96)	70.3 (2.77)	53.1 (2.09)	41.8 (1.65)	32.4 (1.28)	693.0 (27.28)
Average precipitation days (≥ 0.1 mm)	16.9	15.2	14.9	12.9	14.6	13.8	14.7	12.4	12.0	13.6	14.7	16.3	172.0
Average relative humidity (%)	82.2	78.9	73.0	66.1	68.4	68.9	70.0	72.4	79.3	82.7	84.8	83.9	75.9
Source: https://meteomodel.pl/dane/srednie-miesieczne

The climate table below presents weather data with averages from 1991 to 2020, sunshine ranges from 1971 to 2000, and valid extremes from 1951 to the present day:

Climate data for Kraków-Airport (KRK), 1991–2020 normals, extremes 1951–present
Month	Jan	Feb	Mar	Apr	May	Jun	Jul	Aug	Sep	Oct	Nov	Dec	Year
Record high °C (°F)	16.6 (61.9)	19.8 (67.6)	24.1 (75.4)	30.0 (86.0)	32.6 (90.7)	34.2 (93.6)	35.7 (96.3)	37.3 (99.1)	34.8 (94.6)	27.1 (80.8)	22.5 (72.5)	19.3 (66.7)	37.3 (99.1)
Mean maximum °C (°F)	10.0 (50.0)	12.3 (54.1)	18.0 (64.4)	24.3 (75.7)	27.9 (82.2)	31.1 (88.0)	32.5 (90.5)	32.2 (90.0)	27.6 (81.7)	23.4 (74.1)	17.3 (63.1)	10.9 (51.6)	33.8 (92.8)
Mean daily maximum °C (°F)	1.6 (34.9)	3.7 (38.7)	8.4 (47.1)	15.1 (59.2)	19.8 (67.6)	23.2 (73.8)	25.3 (77.5)	25.0 (77.0)	19.5 (67.1)	14.0 (57.2)	7.6 (45.7)	2.7 (36.9)	13.8 (56.8)
Daily mean °C (°F)	−1.6 (29.1)	−0.2 (31.6)	3.5 (38.3)	9.3 (48.7)	14.0 (57.2)	17.6 (63.7)	19.3 (66.7)	18.9 (66.0)	13.9 (57.0)	8.8 (47.8)	3.8 (38.8)	−0.5 (31.1)	8.9 (48.0)
Mean daily minimum °C (°F)	−4.7 (23.5)	−3.7 (25.3)	−0.8 (30.6)	3.7 (38.7)	8.5 (47.3)	12.2 (54.0)	13.8 (56.8)	13.4 (56.1)	9.2 (48.6)	4.7 (40.5)	0.6 (33.1)	−3.4 (25.9)	4.5 (40.1)
Mean minimum °C (°F)	−15.7 (3.7)	−13.0 (8.6)	−8.0 (17.6)	−3.0 (26.6)	1.9 (35.4)	6.6 (43.9)	8.3 (46.9)	7.7 (45.9)	2.8 (37.0)	−3.2 (26.2)	−7.3 (18.9)	−13.5 (7.7)	−18.0 (−0.4)
Record low °C (°F)	−29.9 (−21.8)	−29.5 (−21.1)	−26.7 (−16.1)	−7.5 (18.5)	−3.2 (26.2)	−0.1 (31.8)	5.4 (41.7)	2.7 (36.9)	−3.1 (26.4)	−7.4 (18.7)	−17.2 (1.0)	−29.5 (−21.1)	−29.9 (−21.8)
Average precipitation mm (inches)	37.9 (1.49)	32.3 (1.27)	38.1 (1.50)	46.4 (1.83)	79.0 (3.11)	77.0 (3.03)	98.2 (3.87)	72.5 (2.85)	65.8 (2.59)	51.2 (2.02)	41.4 (1.63)	33.4 (1.31)	673.0 (26.50)
Average extreme snow depth cm (inches)	7.6 (3.0)	6.5 (2.6)	2.7 (1.1)	0.9 (0.4)	0.0 (0.0)	0.0 (0.0)	0.0 (0.0)	0.0 (0.0)	0.0 (0.0)	0.3 (0.1)	2.7 (1.1)	4.1 (1.6)	7.6 (3.0)
Average precipitation days (≥ 0.1 mm)	16.93	15.71	15.00	12.87	14.97	13.37	15.00	12.00	12.07	13.40	14.67	15.77	171.74
Average snowy days (≥ 0 cm)	17.9	14.1	5.5	0.8	0.0	0.0	0.0	0.0	0.0	0.3	4.3	11.9	54.8
Average relative humidity (%)	85.8	82.5	76.3	69.9	72.0	72.7	73.2	74.5	80.2	83.8	87.7	87.5	78.8
Mean monthly sunshine hours	43.3	63.2	100.5	136.9	200.8	193.5	210.5	200.7	125.4	97.7	48.8	32.1	1,453.4
Source 1: Institute of Meteorology and Water Management
Source 2: Meteomodel.pl (records, relative humidity 1991–2020, sunshine 1971–2000)

== Cityscape ==
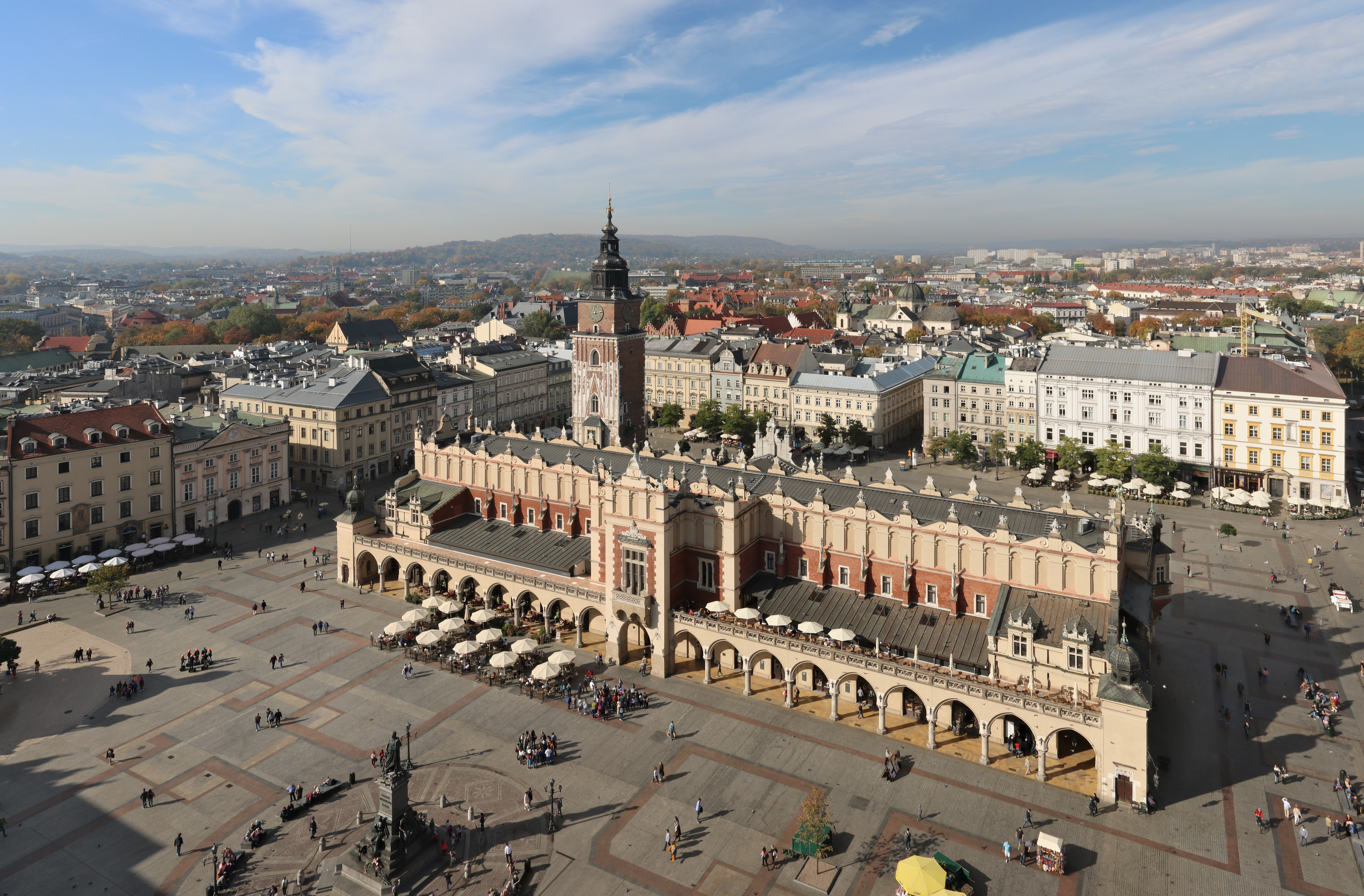
The Renaissance Cloth Hall (Sukiennice) in Main Market Square

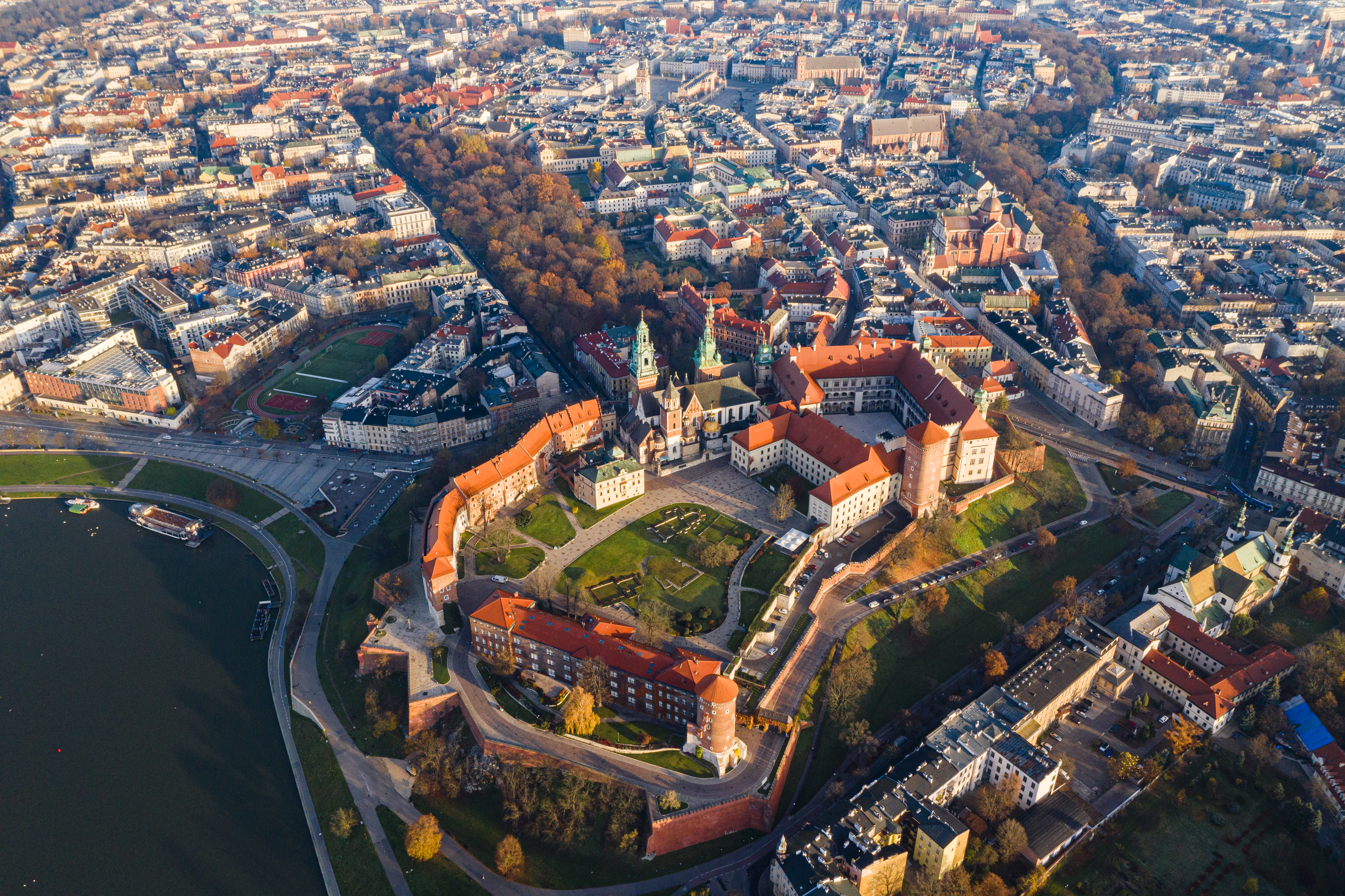
Wawel Royal Castle

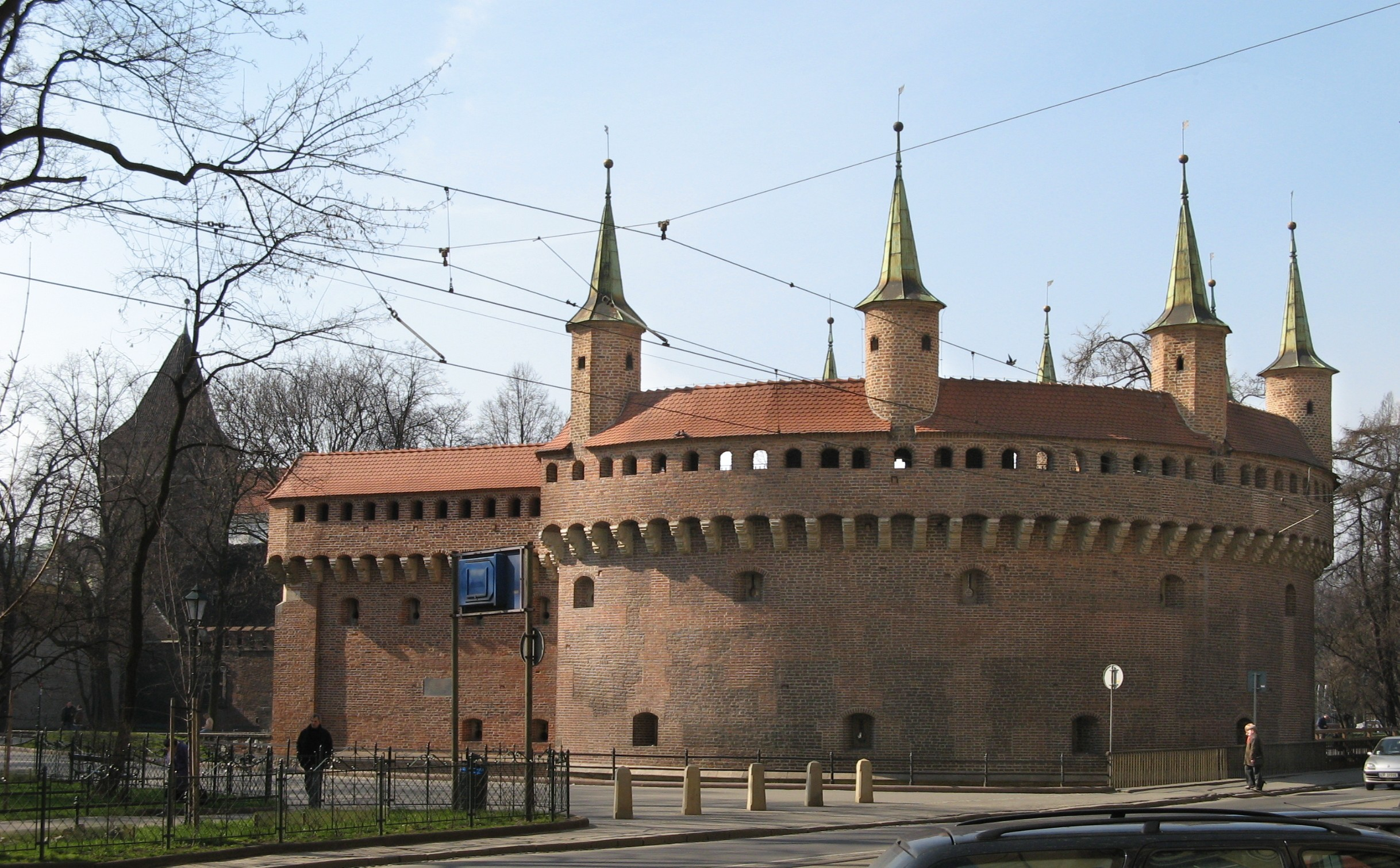
The Kraków Barbican, dating from around 1498, was once a fortified outpost of the inner medieval city.

Kraków provides a showcase setting for many historic forms of architecture developed over the ten centuries, especially Gothic, Renaissance and Baroque styles. Renowned artisans and skilled craftsmen from present-day Italy and Germany were brought and sponsored by kings or nobles who contributed to architectural wealth and diversity. The Brick Gothic manner as well as countless structural elements such as the Renaissance attics with decorative pinnacles became recognisable features of historical buildings in Kraków. Built from its earliest nucleus outward, the city's monuments can be seen in historical order by walking from the city centre out, towards its newer districts.

Kraków's historic centre, which includes the Old Town (Stare Miasto), the Main Market Square (Rynek Główny), the Cloth Hall (Sukiennice), the Barbican (Barbakan), St Florian's Gate, Kazimierz and the Wawel Castle, was included as the first of its kind on the list of UNESCO World Heritage Sites in 1978. The central core surrounded by Planty Park remains the most prominent example of an old town in the country, with the medieval street layout still in existence. Kraków was the royal capital of Poland for many centuries, until Sigismund III Vasa relocated the court to Warsaw in 1596. The district is bisected by the Royal Road, the coronation route traversed by the Kings of Poland. Several important monuments were lost in the course of history, notably the Ratusz town hall. However, the Gothic Town Hall Tower measuring 70 m (229 ft 8 in) in height remains standing.

In addition to the old town, the city's district of Kazimierz is particularly notable for its many renaissance buildings and picturesque streets, as well as the historic Jewish quarter located in the north-eastern part of Kazimierz. Kazimierz was founded in the 14th century to the south-east of the city centre and soon became a wealthy, well-populated area where construction of imposing properties became commonplace. Perhaps the most important feature of medieval Kazimierz was the only major, permanent bridge (Pons Regalis) across the northern arm of the Vistula. This natural barrier used to separate Kazimierz from the Old Town for several centuries, while the bridge connected Kraków to the Wieliczka Salt Mine and the lucrative Hungarian trade route. The last structure at this location (at the end of modern Stradom Street) was dismantled in 1880 when the northern arm of the river was filled in with earth and rock, and subsequently built over.

By the 1930s, Kraków had 120 officially registered synagogues and prayer houses that spanned across the old city. Much of Jewish intellectual life had moved to new centres like Podgórze. This, in turn, led to the redevelopment and renovation of much of Kazimierz and the development of new districts in Kraków. Most historic buildings in central Kazimierz today are preserved in their original form. Some old buildings, however, were not repaired after the devastation brought by the Second World War, and have remained empty. Most recent efforts at restoring the historic neighbourhoods gained new impetus around 1993. Kazimierz is now a well-visited area, seeing a booming growth in Jewish-themed restaurants, bars, bookstores and souvenir shops.

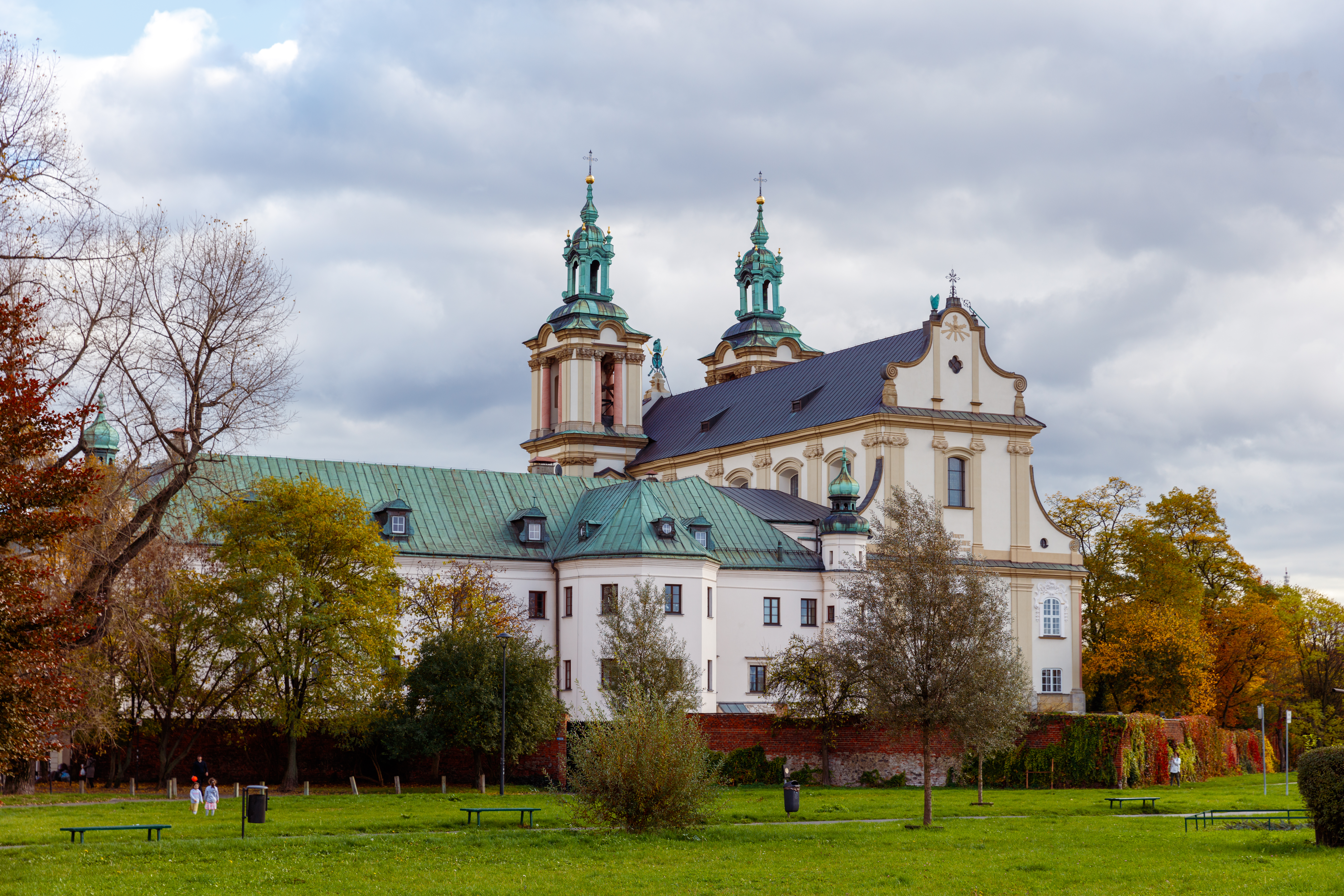
Skałka ("Small Rock") Church, and the adjacent monastery of Pauline Fathers, is a place of burial for distinguished Poles and Cracovians.

As the city of Kraków began to expand further under the rule of the Austro-Hungarian Empire, the new architectural styles also developed. Key buildings from the 19th and early 20th centuries in Kraków include the Jan Matejko Academy of Fine Arts, the directorate of the Polish State Railways as well as the original complex of Kraków Główny railway station and the city's Academy of Economics. It was also at around that time that Kraków's first radial boulevards began to appear, with the city undergoing a large-scale program aimed at transforming the ancient Polish capital into a sophisticated regional centre of the Austro-Hungarian Empire. New representative government buildings and multi-story tenement houses were built at around that time. Much of the urban-planning beyond the walls of the Old Town was done by Polish architects and engineers trained in Vienna. Some major projects of the era include the development of the Jagiellonian University's new premises and the building of the Collegium Novum just west of the Old Town. The imperial style planning of the city's further development continued until the return of Poland's independence, following the First World War. Early modernist style in Kraków is represented by such masterpieces as the Palace of Art by Franciszek Mączyński and the 'House under the Globe'. Secession style architecture, which had arrived in Kraków from Vienna, became popular towards the end of the Partitions.

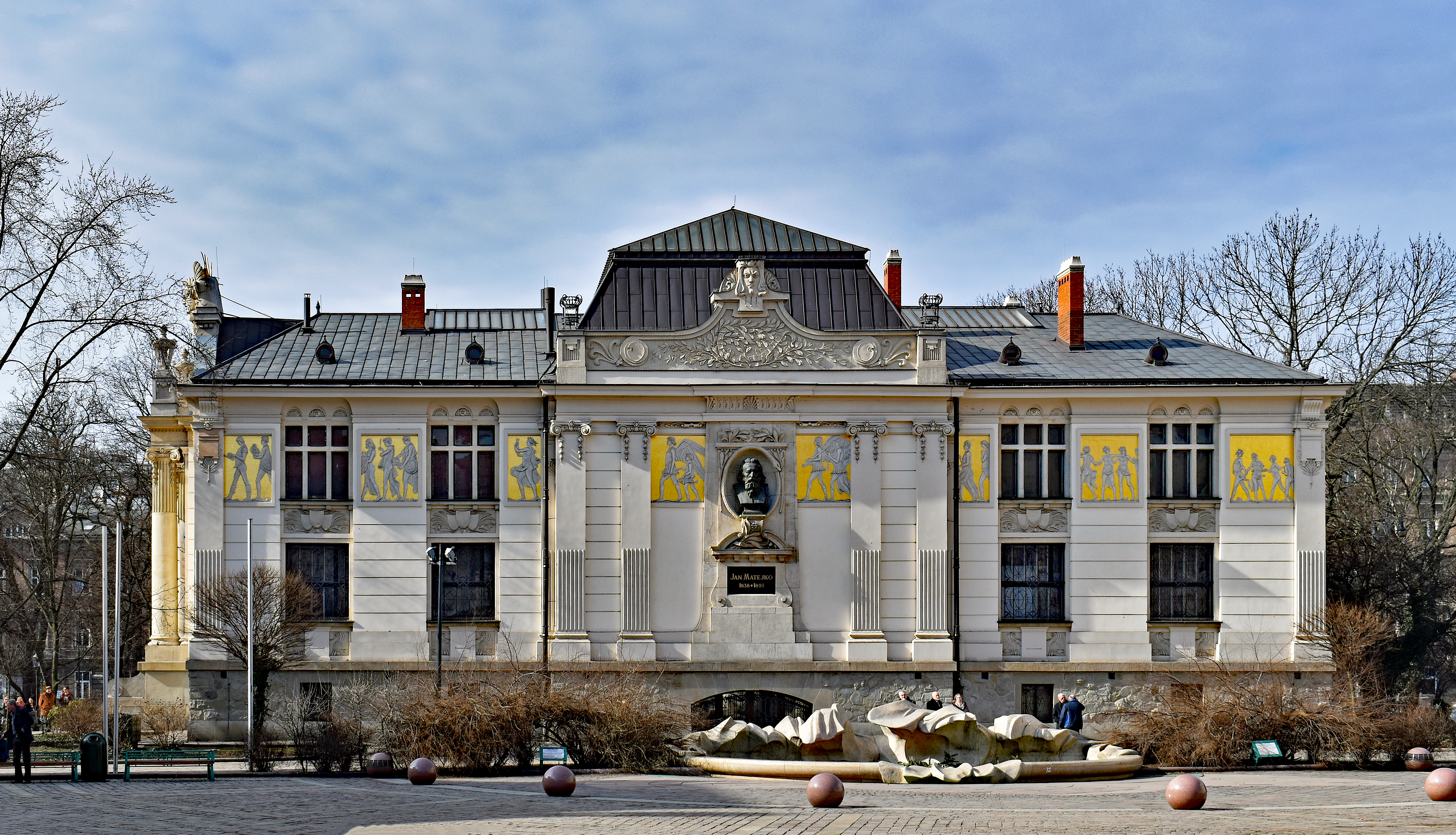
Palace of Art at Szczepański Square is an example of Art Nouveau architecture in central Kraków.

With Poland's regained independence came the major change in the fortunes of Kraków—now the second most important city of a sovereign nation. The state began to make new plans for the city development and commissioned a number of representative buildings. The predominant style for new projects was modernism with various interpretations of the art-deco style. Important buildings constructed in the style of Polish modernism include the Feniks 'LOT' building on Basztowa Street, the Feniks department store on the Main Square and the Municipal Savings Bank on Szczepański Square. The Józef Piłsudski house is also of note as a particularly good example of interwar architecture in the city.

After the Second World War, new Communist government adopted Stalinist monumentalism. The doctrine of Socialist realism in Poland, as in other countries of the Eastern Bloc, was enforced from 1949 to 1956. It involved all domains of art, but its most spectacular achievements were made in the field of urban design. The guidelines for this new trend were spelled-out in a 1949 resolution of the National Council of Party Architects. Architecture was to become a weapon in establishing the new social order by the communists. The ideological impact of urban design was valued more than aesthetics. It aimed at expressing persistence and power. This form of architecture was implemented in the new industrial district of Nowa Huta with apartment blocks constructed according to a Stalinist blueprint, with repetitious courtyards and wide, tree-lined avenues.

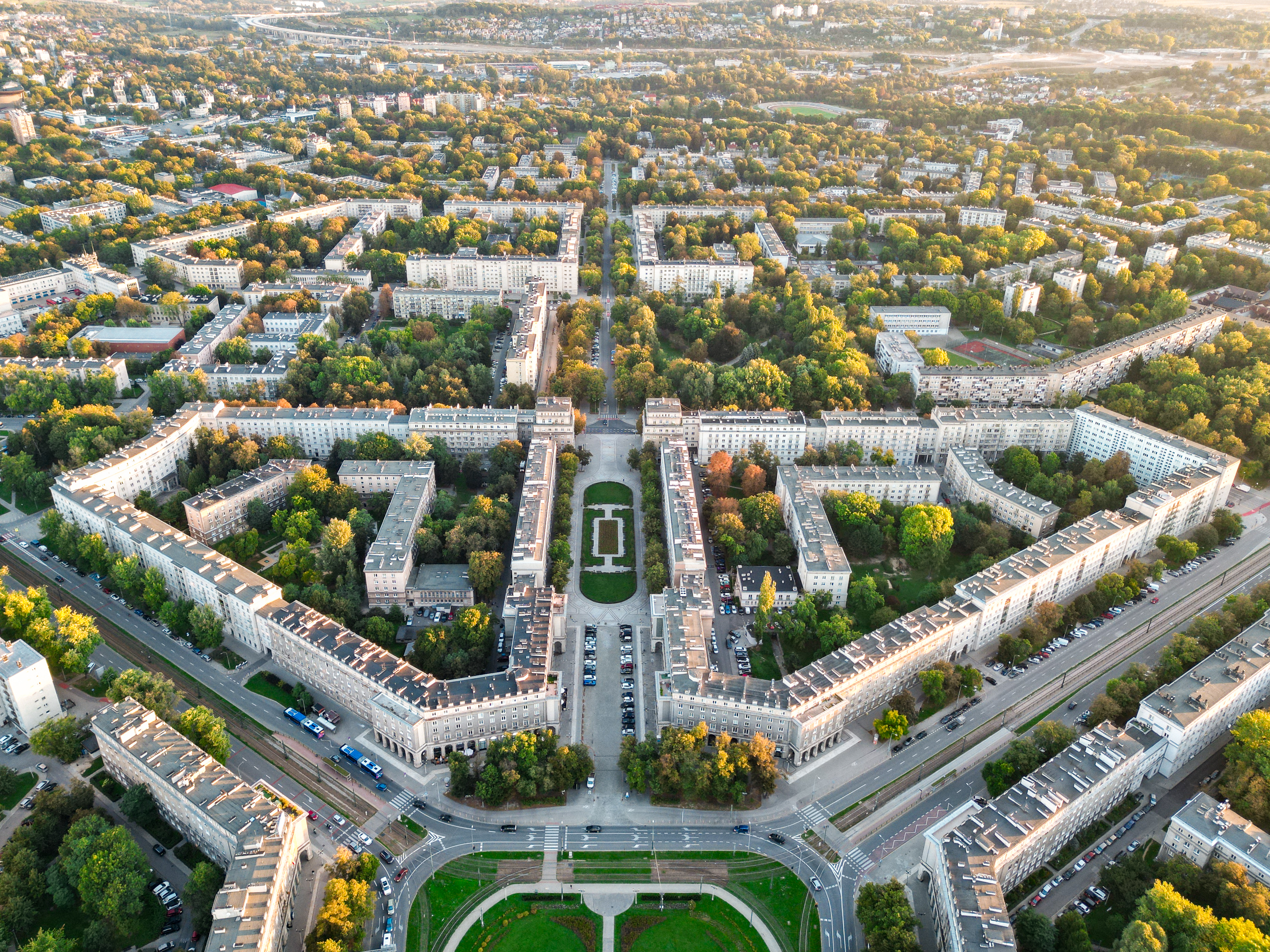
Nowa Huta Avenue of Roses

Since the style of the Renaissance was generally regarded as the most revered in old Polish architecture, it was also used for augmenting Poland's Socialist national format. However, in the course of incorporating the principles of Socialist realism, there were quite a few deviations introduced by the communists. From 1953, critical opinions in the Party were increasingly frequent, and the doctrine was given up in 1956 marking the end of Stalinism. The soc-realist centre of Nowa Huta is considered to be a meritorious monument of the times. This period in postwar architecture was followed by the mass-construction of large Panel System apartment blocks, most of which were built outside the city centre and thus do not encroach upon the beauty of the old or new towns. Some examples of the new style (e.g., Hotel Cracovia) recently listed as heritage monuments were built during the latter half of the 20th century in Kraków.

After the Revolutions of 1989 and the birth of the Third Republic in the latter half of the 20th century, a number of new architectural projects were completed, including the construction of large business parks and commercial facilities such as the Galeria Krakowska, or infrastructure investments like the Kraków Fast Tram. A good example of this would be the Manggha Museum of Japanese Art and Technology designed by Arata Isozaki, the 2007-built Pawilon Wyspiański 2000, which is used as a multi-purpose information and exhibition space, or the Małopolski Garden of Arts (Małopolski Ogród Sztuki), a multi-purpose exhibition and theatre complex located in the historic Old Town.

=== Parks and gardens ===
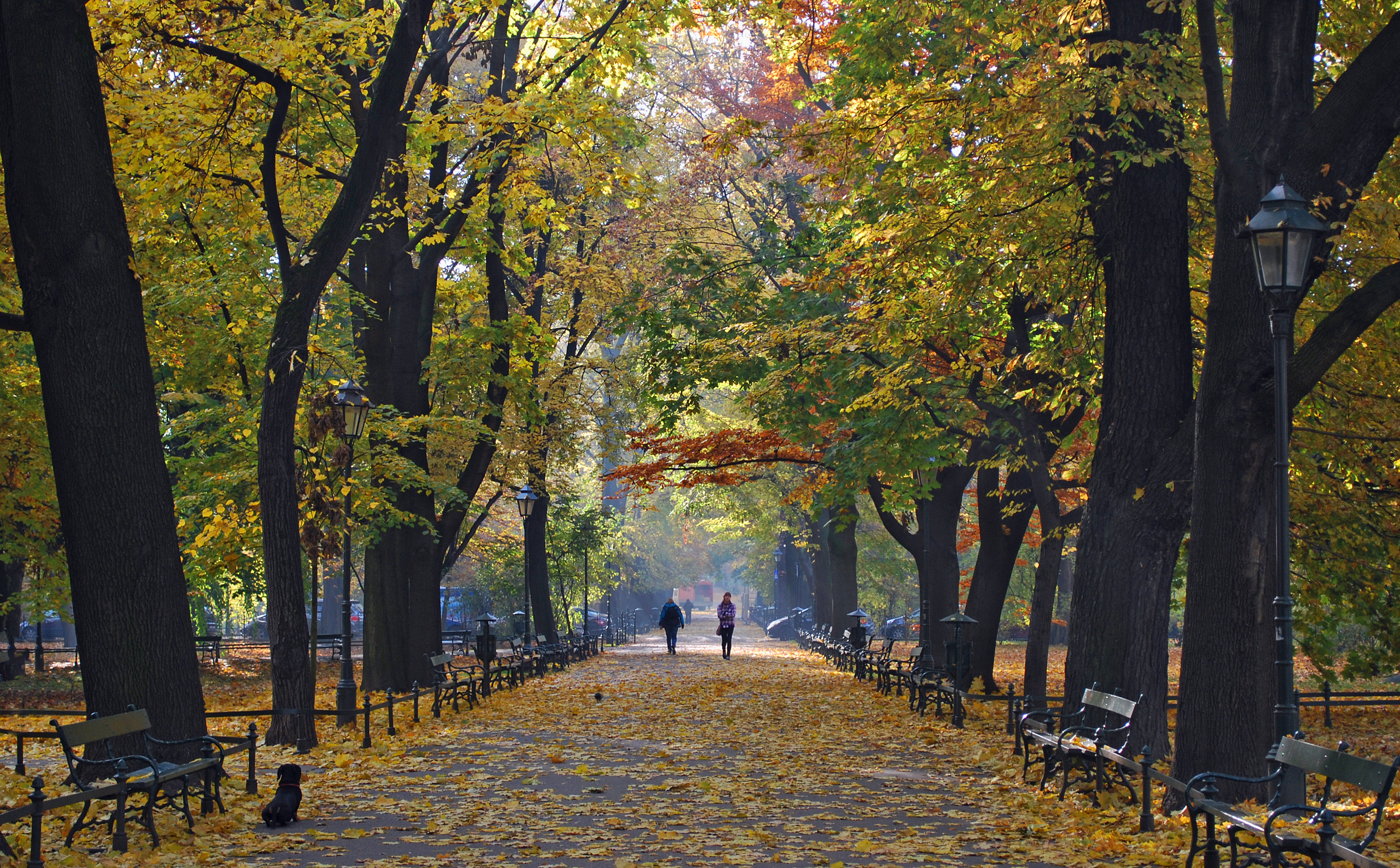
Planty Park surrounds Kraków's Old Town.

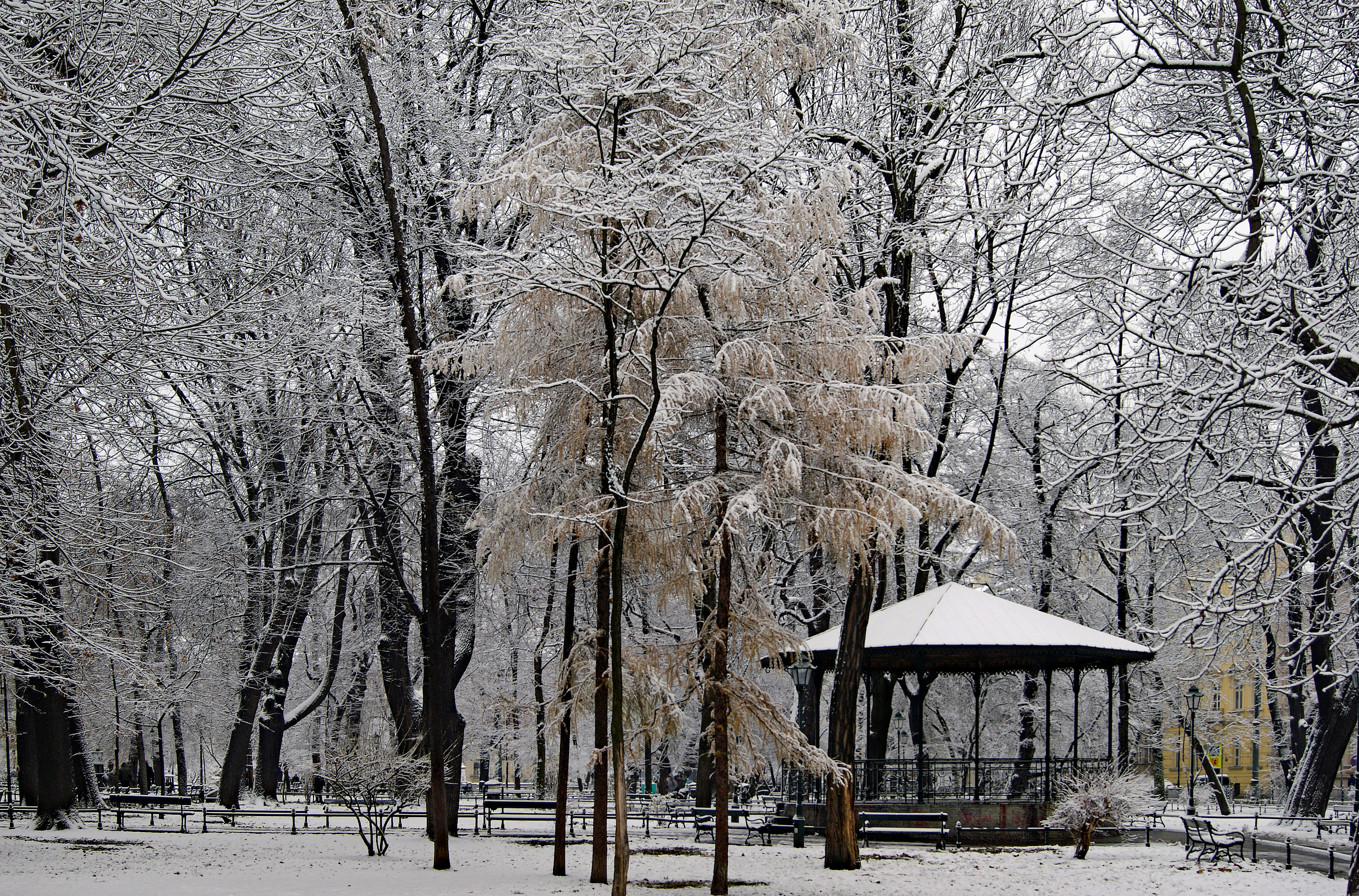
A pavilion within the Planty Park during winter

There are about 40 parks in Kraków, including dozens of gardens and forests. Several, like the Planty Park, Botanical Garden, Zoological Garden, Royal Garden, Park Krakowski, Jordan Park and Błonia Park are located in the centre of the city; with others, such as Zakrzówek, Wanda Green Ravine Park, Wolski forest, Strzelecki Park and Lotników Park in the surrounding districts. Parks cover about 318.5 hectares (787 acres; 1.23 mi^{2}) of the city.

The best-known park in Kraków is the Planty Park. Established between 1822 and 1830 in place of the old city walls, it forms a green belt around the Old Town and consists of a chain of smaller gardens designed in various styles and adorned with monuments. The park has an area of 21 hectares (52 acres) and a length of 4 kilometres (2.5 mi), forming a scenic walkway popular with Cracovians.

Jordan Park, founded in 1889 by Henryk Jordan, was the first public park of its kind in Europe. Built on the banks of the Rudawa, the park was equipped with running and exercise tracks, playgrounds, a swimming pool, amphitheatre, pavilions, and a pond for boat rowing and water bicycles. It is located in the grounds of one of the city's larger parks, Błonia Park. The less prominent Park Krakowski, founded in 1885 by Stanisław Rehman, was a popular destination point for Cracovians at the end of the 19th century, but has since been greatly reduced in size because of rapid real estate development.

=== Environment ===
There are five nature reserves in Kraków with a total area of 48.6 hectares (120 acres). Smaller green zones constitute parts of the Kraków-Częstochowa Upland Jurassic Landscape Parks' Board, which deals with the protection areas of the Polish Jura. Under its jurisdiction are: the Bielany-Tyniec Landscape Park (Park Bielańsko-Tyniecki), Tenczynek Landscape Park (Park Tenczyński) and Kraków Valleys Landscape Park (Park Krajobrazowy Dolinki Krakowskie), with their watersheds. The natural reserves of the Polish Jura Chain are part of the CORINE biotopes programme due to their unique flora, fauna, geomorphology and landscape. The western part of Kraków constitutes the so-called Obszar Krakowski ecological network, including the ecological corridor of the Vistula. The southern slopes of limestone hills provide conditions for the development of thermophilous vegetation, grasslands and shrubs.

The city is spaced along an extended latitudinal transect of the Vistula River Valley with a network of tributaries including its right tributary Wilga, and left: Rudawa, Białucha, Dłubnia and Sanka. The rivers and their valleys along with bodies of water are considered some of the most interesting natural sights of Kraków.

Kraków and its mountainous environs often suffer from Europe's worst air pollution because of smog, caused by burning coal for heating, especially in winter.

== Governance ==
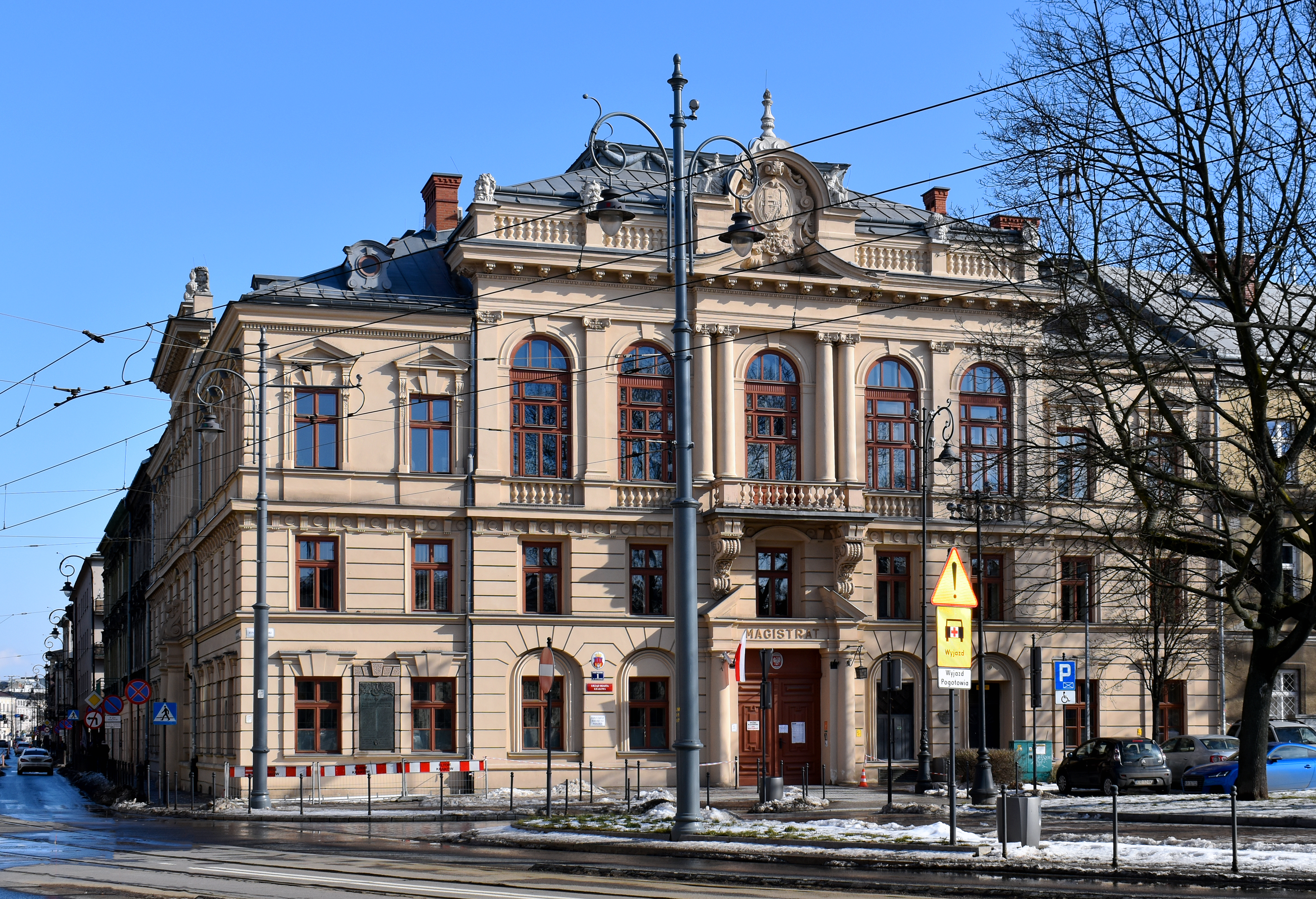
The New Town Hall of Podgórze, which used to be a self-governing independent town until its incorporation into Kraków in 1915

The Kraków City Council has 43 elected members, one of whom is the mayor, or President of Kraków, elected every four years. The election of the City Council and of the local head of government, which takes place at the same time, is based on legislation introduced on 20 June 2002. The President of Kraków, re-elected for his fourth term in 2014, is Jacek Majchrowski. Several members of the Polish national Parliament (Sejm) are elected from the Kraków constituency. The city's official symbols include a coat of arms, a flag, a seal, and a banner.

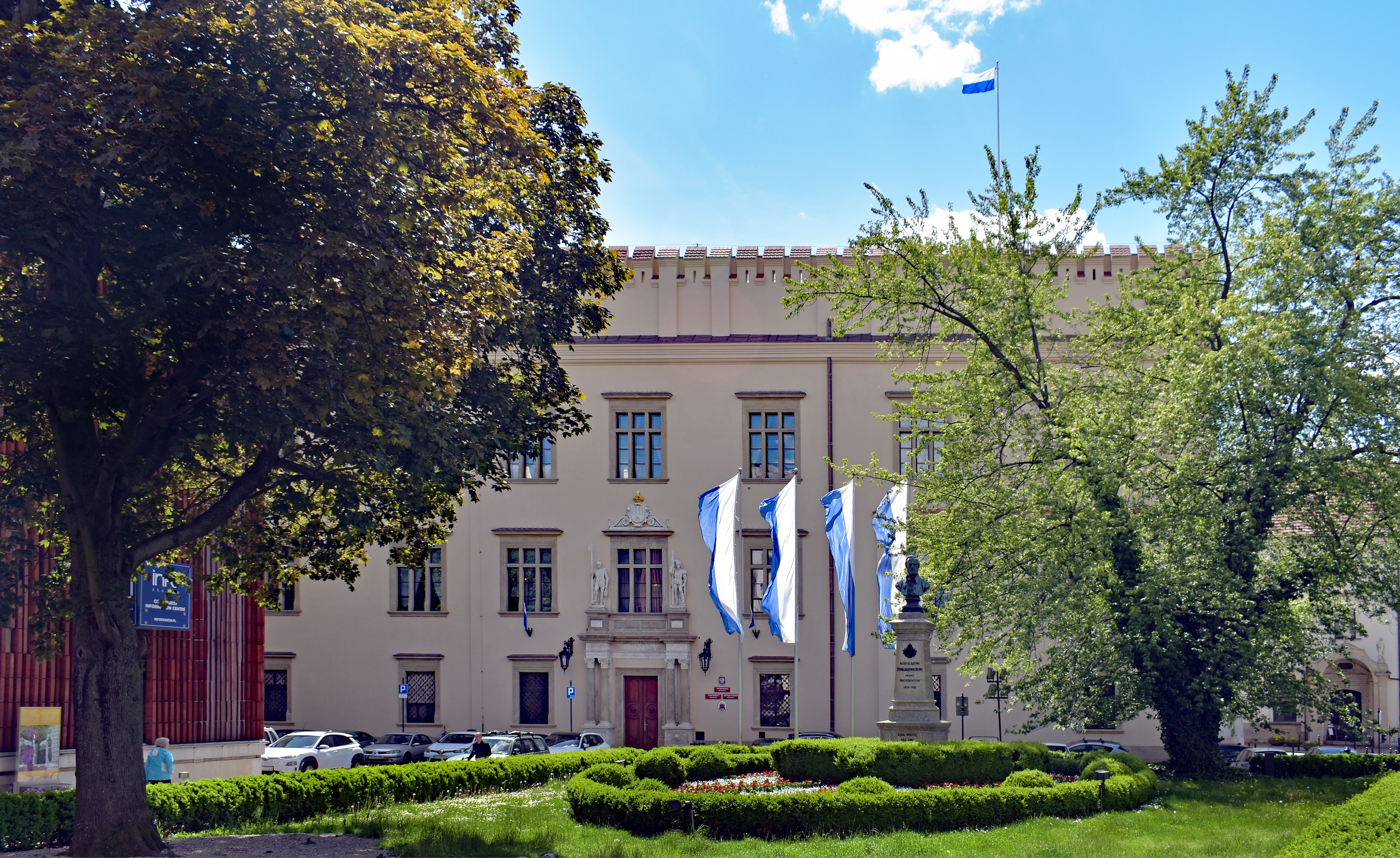
Wielopolski Palace from 1560, the seat of Kraków's mayor, administration and city council

Responsibilities of Kraków's president include drafting and implementing resolutions, enacting city bylaws, managing the city budget, employing city administrators, and preparing against floods and natural disasters. The president fulfills his duties with the help of the City Council, city managers and city inspectors. In the 1990s, the city government was reorganised to better differentiate between its political agenda and administrative functions. As a result, the Office of Public Information was created to handle inquiries and foster communication between city departments and citizens at large.

In 2000, the city government introduced a new long-term program called "Safer City" in cooperation with the Police, Traffic, Social Services, Fire, Public Safety, and the Youth Departments. Subsequently, the number of criminal offences dropped by 3 percent between 2000 and 2001, and the rate of detection increased by 1.4 percent to a total of 30.2 percent in the same period. The city is receiving help in carrying out the program from all educational institutions and the local media, including TV, radio and the press.

=== Districts ===
Kraków is divided into 18 administrative districts (dzielnica) or boroughs, each with a degree of autonomy within its own municipal government. Prior to March 1991, the city had been divided into four quarters which still give a sense of identity to Kraków: the towns of Podgórze, Nowa Huta and Krowodrza, which were amalgamated into the city as it expanded; and the ancient town centre of Kraków itself.

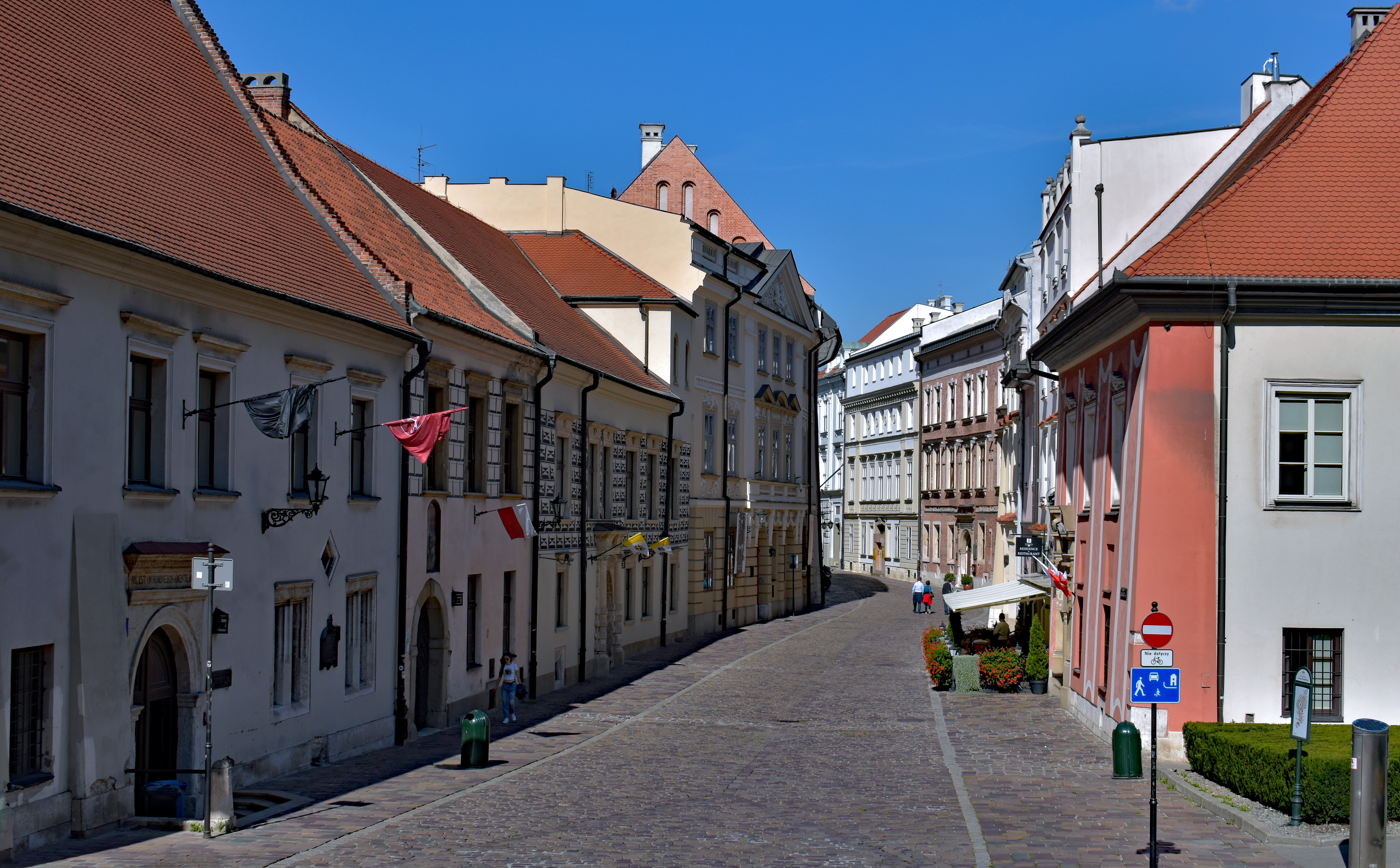
Kanonicza Street in the Old Town (Stare Miasto) district

The oldest neighbourhoods of Kraków were incorporated into the city before the late 18th century. These include the Old Town (Stare Miasto), once contained within the city defensive walls and now encircled by the Planty park; the Wawel District, which is the site of the Royal Castle and the cathedral; Stradom and Kazimierz with its historic Jewish quarter, the latter originally divided into Christian and Jewish quarters; and the ancient town of Kleparz.

Major districts added in the 19th and 20th centuries include Podgórze—until 1915, a separate town on the southern bank of the Vistula—and Nowa Huta, to the east of the city centre, which was built after World War II.

Among the most notable historic districts of the city are: Wawel Hill, home to Wawel Castle and Wawel Cathedral, where many historic Polish kings are buried; the medieval Old Town, with its 200-metre-square (660 ft) Main Market Square; dozens of old churches and museums; the 14th-century buildings of the Jagiellonian University; and Kazimierz, the historical centre of Kraków's Jewish social and religious life.

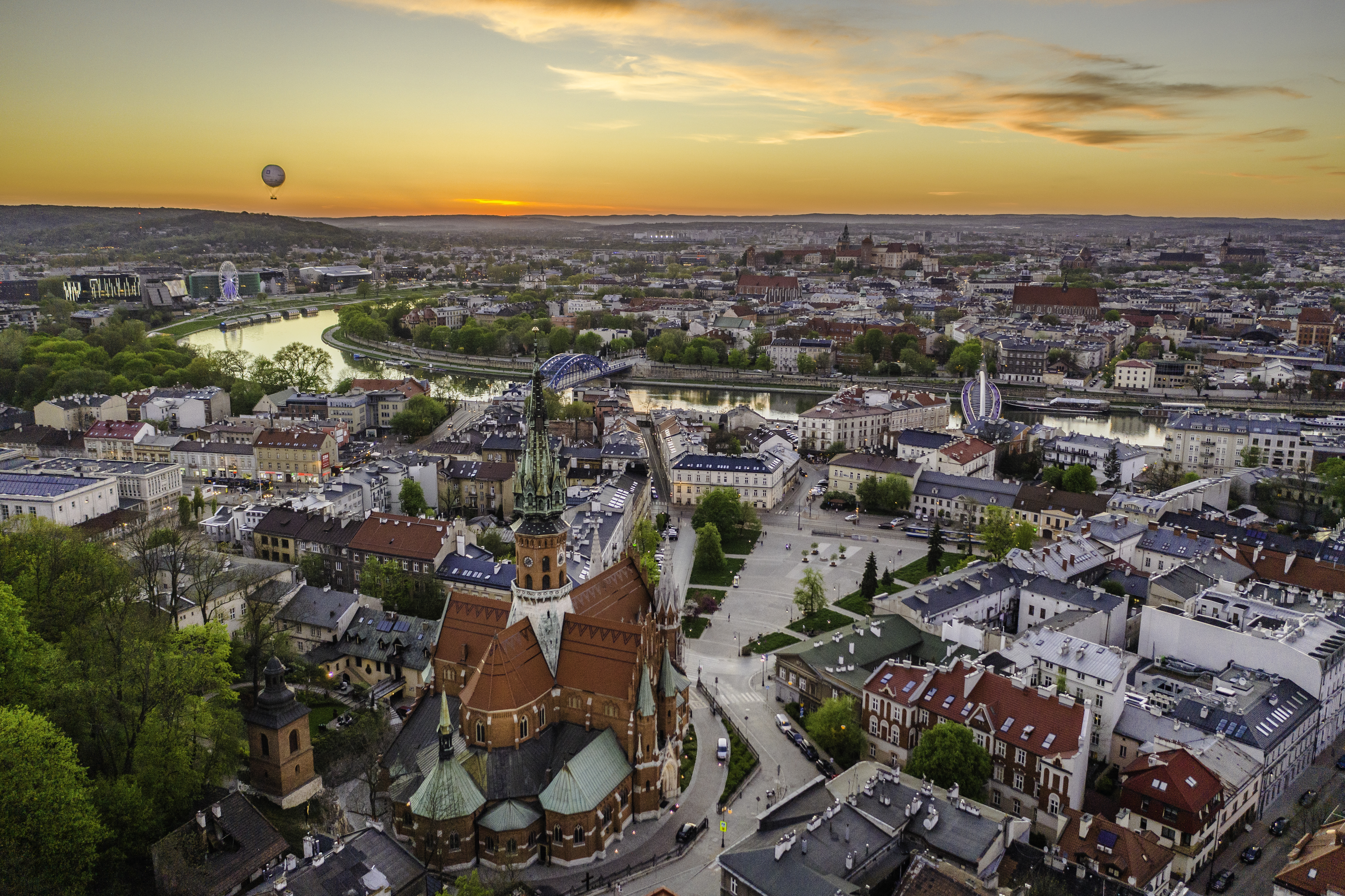
Rynek Podgórski - main square of Podgórze district with Church of St Joseph

The Old Town district of Kraków is home to about six thousand historic sites and more than two million works of art. Its rich variety of heritage architecture includes Romanesque (e.g. St Andrew's Church), Renaissance (e.g. Kraków Cloth Hall), Baroque (e.g. Saints Peter and Paul Church) and Gothic buildings. Kraków's palaces, churches, theatres and mansions display a great variety of colour, architectural details, stained glass, paintings, sculptures, and furnishings.

In the Market Square stands the Gothic St Mary's Basilica (Kościół Mariacki). Rebuilt in the 14th century, it features the famous wooden altar (Veit Stoss altarpiece), the largest Gothic altarpiece in the world, carved by Veit Stoss.

District	Population	Area (2009)
Stare Miasto (I)	41,121	559.29 ha (5.5929 km^{2})
Grzegórzki (II)	30,441	586.18 ha (5.8618 km^{2})
Prądnik Czerwony (III)	46,621	638.82 ha (6.3882 km^{2})
Prądnik Biały (IV)	66,649	2,370.55 ha (23.7055 km^{2})
Krowodrza (V)	34,467	538.32 ha (5.3832 km^{2})
Bronowice (VI)	22,467	957.98 ha (9.5798 km^{2})
Zwierzyniec (VII)	20,243	2,866.9 ha (28.669 km^{2})
Dębniki (VIII)	56,258	4,671.11 ha (46.7111 km^{2})
Łagiewniki-Borek Fałęcki (IX)	15,014	573.9 ha (5.739 km^{2})
Swoszowice (X)	20,641	2,416.73 ha (24.1673 km^{2})
Podgórze Duchackie (XI)	52,522	1,065.24 ha (10.6524 km^{2})
Bieżanów-Prokocim (XII)	63,270	1,846.93 ha (18.4693 km^{2})
Podgórze (XIII)	32,050	2,516.07 ha (25.1607 km^{2})
Czyżyny (XIV)	26,169	1,229.44 ha (12.2944 km^{2})
Mistrzejowice (XV)	54,276	547.82 ha (5.4782 km^{2})
Bieńczyce (XVI)	44,237	369.43 ha (3.6943 km^{2})
Wzgórza Krzesławickie (XVII)	20,234	2,375.82 ha (23.7582 km^{2})
Nowa Huta (XVIII)	58,320	6,552.52 ha (65.5252 km^{2})
Total	760,700	32,680.00 ha (326.8000 km^{2})

The current divisions were introduced by the Kraków City Hall on 19 April 1995. The districts were each assigned a Roman numeral as well as a name: Stare Miasto (I), Grzegórzki (II), Prądnik Czerwony (III), Prądnik Biały (IV), Krowodrza (V), Bronowice (VI), Zwierzyniec (VII), Dębniki (VIII), Łagiewniki-Borek Fałęcki (IX), Swoszowice (X), Podgórze Duchackie (XI), Bieżanów-Prokocim (XII), Podgórze (XIII), Czyżyny (XIV), Mistrzejowice (XV), Bieńczyce (XVI), Wzgórza Krzesławickie (XVII), and Nowa Huta (XVIII).

Map of districts of the City of Kraków

Interactive map. For more information, click on district number.

== Economy ==
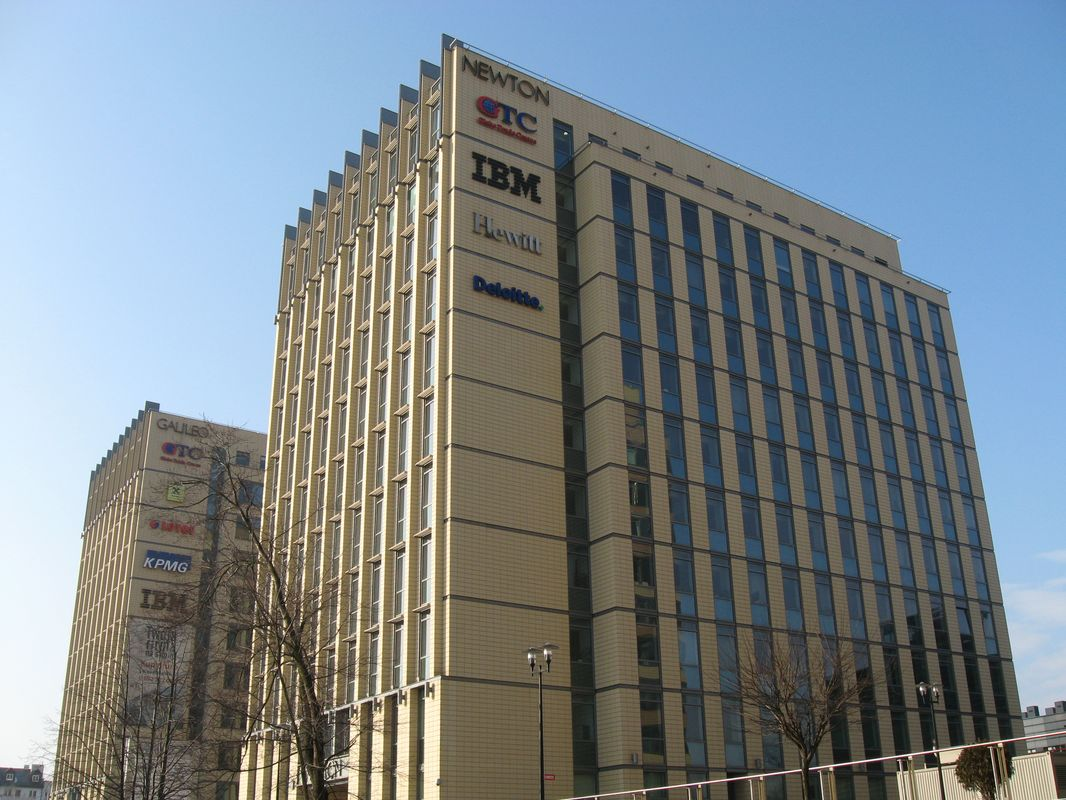
The Centre for Business Innovation office complex in Kraków

Kraków is one of Poland's most important economic centres and the economic hub of the Lesser Poland (Małopolska) region. Since the fall of communism, the private sector has been growing steadily. There are about 50 large multinational companies in the city, including Google, Uber, IBM, Shell, UBS, HSBC, Motorola, Aptiv, MAN, General Electric, ABB, Aon, Akamai, Cisco, Hitachi, Altria, Capgemini, and Sabre Holdings, along with other British, German and Scandinavian-based firms. The city is also the global headquarters for Comarch, an enterprise software house. Kraków is the second most-visited city in Poland (after Warsaw). According to the World Investment Report 2011 by the UN Conference for Trade and Development (UNCTAD), Kraków is also the most emergent city location for investment in global BPO projects (Business Process Outsourcing) in the world.

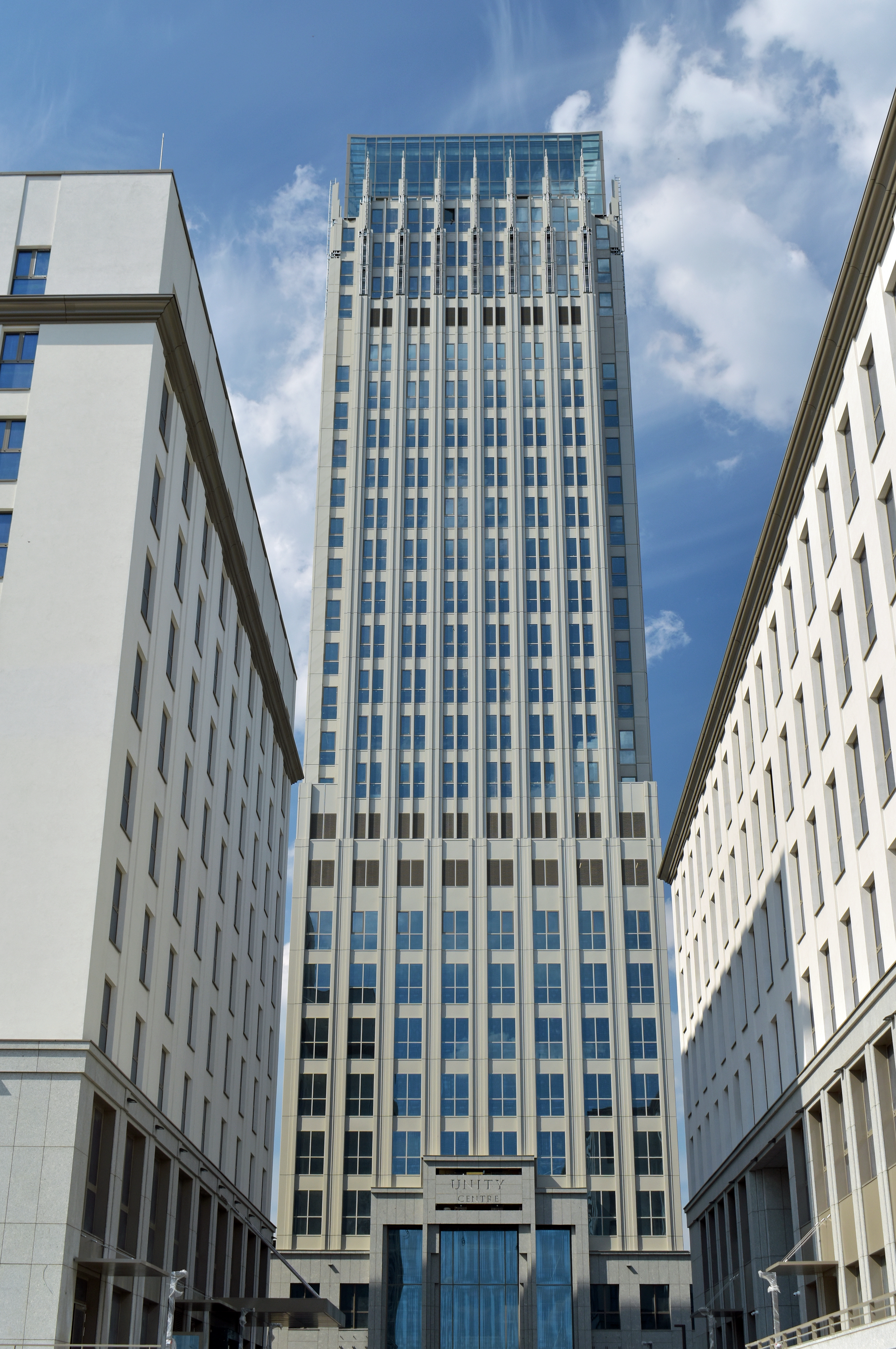
Unity Tower is one of the tallest buildings in the city.

In 2011, the city budget, which is presented by the Mayor of Kraków on 15 November annually, has a projected revenue of 3,500,000,000 złoty. The primary sources of revenue were as follows: 14% from the municipal taxation on real estate properties and the use of amenities, 30% in transfers from the national budget, and 34% in state subsidies. Projected expenditures, totalling 3.52 billion złoty, included 21% in city development costs and 79% in city maintenance costs. Of the maintenance costs, as much as 39% were spent on education and childcare. The City of Kraków's development costs included; 41% toward construction of roads, transport, and communication (combined), and 25% for the city's infrastructure and environment. The city has a high bond credit rating, and some 60% of the population is under the age of 45.

Unity Tower was completed in 2020 after almost 30 years, creating a new business and residential centre. It is the second-tallest building in the city after K1.

=== Knowledge and innovation community ===
Kraków is one of the co-location centres of Knowledge and Innovation Community (Sustainable Energy) of The European Institute of Innovation and Technology (EIT).

InnoEnergy is an integrated alliance of reputable organisations from the education, research and industry sectors. It was created based on long standing links of cooperation as well as the principles of excellence. The partners have jointly developed a strategy to tackle the weaknesses of the European innovation landscape in the field of sustainable energy.

== Transport ==
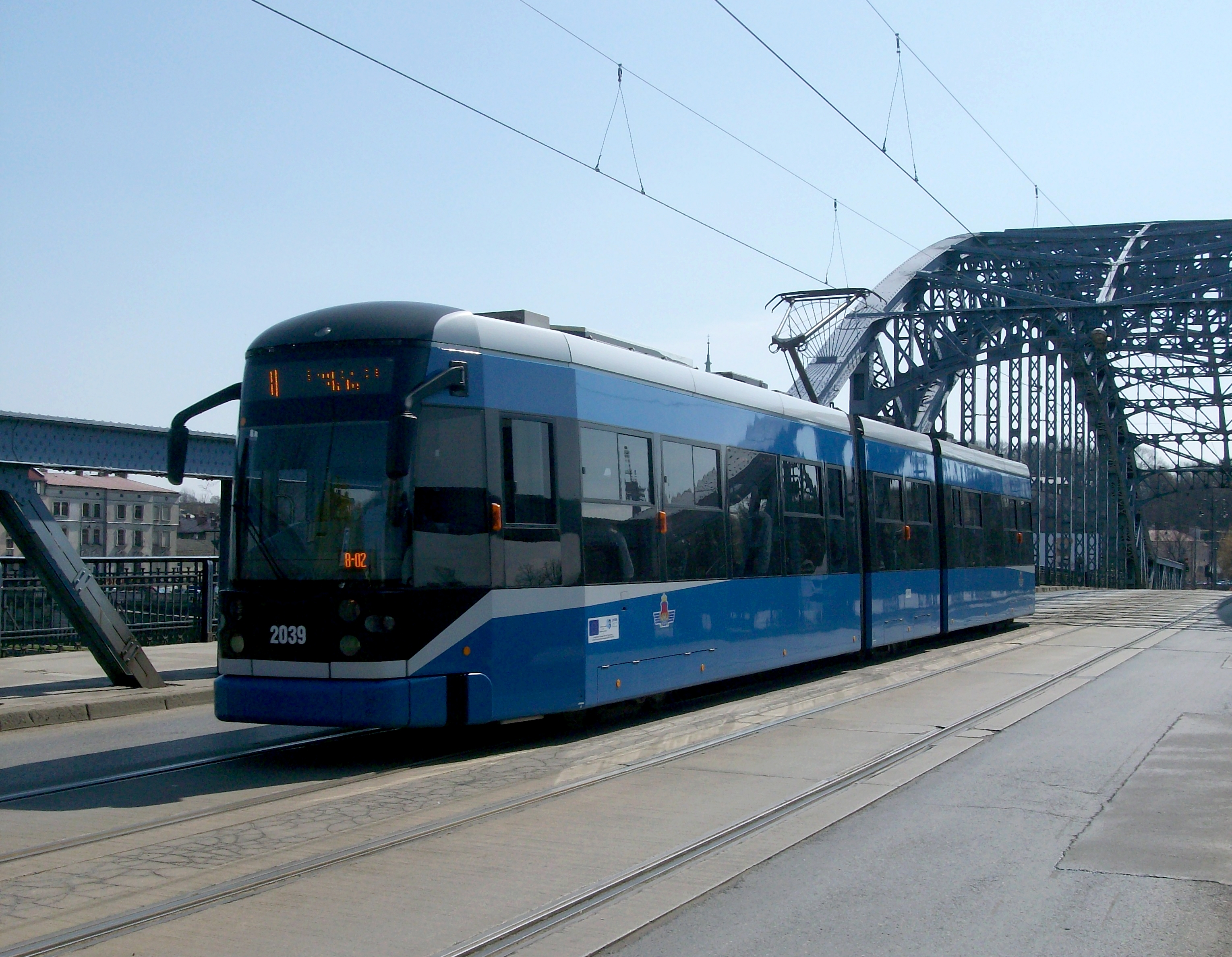
Bombardier city tram on Piłsudski Bridge

Public transport is based on a fairly dense network of tram and bus routes operated by a municipal company, supplemented by a number of private minibus operators. There is no rapid transit system in Kraków, but a metro line is planned. First works are expected to commence in 2028. Local trains connect some of the suburbs. The bulk of the city's historic area has been turned into a pedestrian zone with rickshaws and horse-drawn carriages; however, the trams run within a three-block radius. The historic means of transportation in the city can be examined at the Museum of Municipal Engineering in the Kazimierz district, with many old trams, cars and buses.

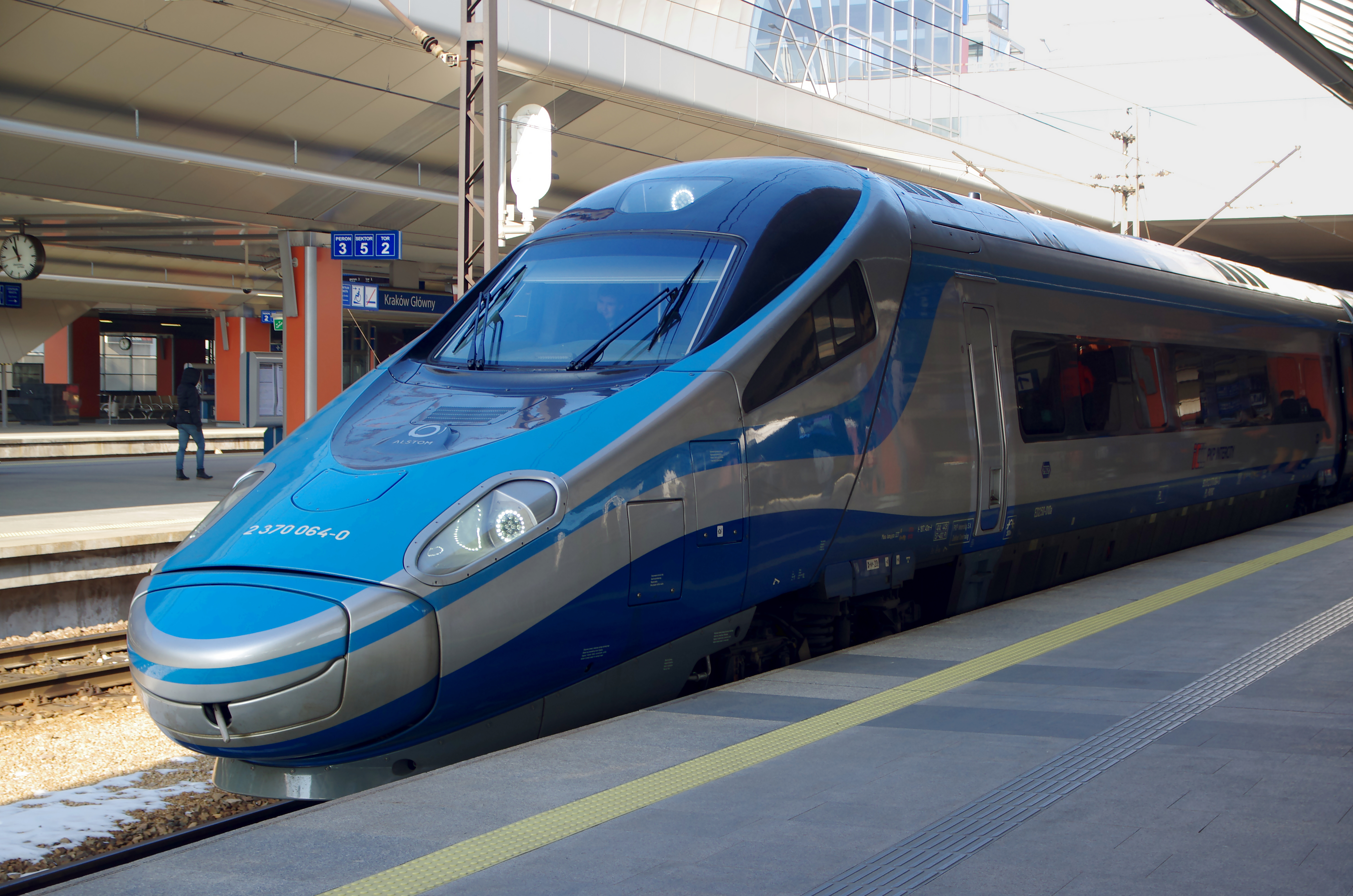
PKP Intercity train at the Main Railway Station

Railway connections are available to most Polish cities, e.g. Katowice, Częstochowa, Szczecin, Gdynia and Warsaw. International destinations include Bratislava, Budapest, Vienna, Prague, Berlin, Hamburg, Lviv, Kyiv, and Odesa (June–September). The main railway station is located just outside the Old Town District and is well-served by public transport.

Kraków's airport, officially named Kraków John Paul II International Airport (IATA: KRK), is located 11 km (7 mi) west of the city. Direct trains cover the route between Kraków Główny train station and the airport in 20 minutes. Kraków Airport served around 5,800,000 passengers in 2017. Also, the Katowice International Airport is located 80 kilometres (50 miles) or about 75 minutes from Kraków.

In Autumn 2016, Poland's oldest Bicycle-sharing system was modernised and now offers 1,500 bikes at 169 stations under the name of Wavelo (pl), which is owned by BikeU of the French multinational company Egis.

== Demographics ==
Kraków population pyramid in 2021

Kraków had a recorded population of 774,839 in 2019, which increased to 804,237 in 2023. Selected demographic indicators are presented in a table (below), compiled on the basis of only the population living in Kraków permanently. The larger metropolitan area of the city encompasses a territory in which (in 2010) 1,393,893 inhabitants live.

Already in the Middle Ages, the population of Kraków consisting of numerous ethnic groups, began to grow rapidly. It doubled between 1100 and 1300 from 5,000 to 10,000, and in 1400 counted 14,000 inhabitants. By 1550, the population of metropolitan Kraków was 18,000; although it decreased to 15,000 in the next fifty years due to calamity. By the early 17th century the Kraków population had reached 28,000 inhabitants.

In the historical 1931 census preceding World War II, 78.1% of Cracovians declared Polish as their primary language, with Yiddish or Hebrew at 20.9%, Ukrainian 0.4%, German 0.3%, and Russian 0.1%. The ravages of history have greatly reduced the percentage of ethnic minorities living in Kraków.

In the last two decades, Kraków has seen a large growth of immigrant population. In the 2002 census, only 0.25% of respondents living in the city declared a non-Polish nationality primarily. As of 2019, it was estimated that foreigners accounted for as much as 10% of the city's population.

Foreign residents (2023)
Nationality	Population
Ukraine	45,100
Belarus	5,975
Georgia	3,640
India	2,636
Russia	2,221
Italy	1,512

Population growth in Kraków since 1791

=== Religion ===
Religion in Krakow (2021)
1. Catholicism (58.0%)
2. Protestantism (0.50%)
3. Other Christian (0.20%)
4. Other (0.01%)
5. Irreligion (14.0%)
6. Undeclared (27.0%)

The metropolitan city of Kraków has more than 300 churches and is known as the city of churches. The abundance of historic landmark temples along with the plenitude of monasteries and convents earned the city a countrywide reputation as the "Northern Rome" in the past. The churches of Kraków comprise over 120 places of worship (2007) of which over 65 were built in the 20th century. More are still being added. In addition to Roman Catholicism, other denominations present include Jehovah's Witnesses, Mariavite Church, Polish Catholic Church, Polish Orthodox Church, Protestantism and Latter-Day Saints. As of 2017, weekly Mass attendance in the Archdiocese of Kraków was 49.9 percent, above the national Polish average of 38.3 percent.

Kraków contains also an outstanding collection of monuments of Jewish sacred architecture unmatched anywhere in Poland. Kraków was an influential centre of Jewish spiritual life before the outbreak of World War II, with all its manifestations of religious observance from Orthodox to Hasidic and Reform flourishing side by side. There were at least 90 synagogues in Kraków active before the Nazi German invasion of Poland, serving its burgeoning Jewish community of 60,000–80,000 (out of the city's total population of 237,000), established since the early 12th century.

Most synagogues of Kraków were ruined during World War II by the Nazis who despoiled them of all ceremonial objects, and used them as storehouses for ammunition, firefighting equipment, as general storage facilities and stables. The post-Holocaust Jewish population of the city had dwindled to about 5,900 before the end of the 1940s. Poland was the only Eastern Bloc country to allow free Jewish aliyah (emigration to Israel) without visas or exit permits upon the conclusion of World War II. In recent time, thanks to efforts of the local Jewish and Polish organisations including foreign financial aid from the American Jewish Joint Distribution Committee, many synagogues underwent major restorations and serve religious and tourist purposes.

== Education ==
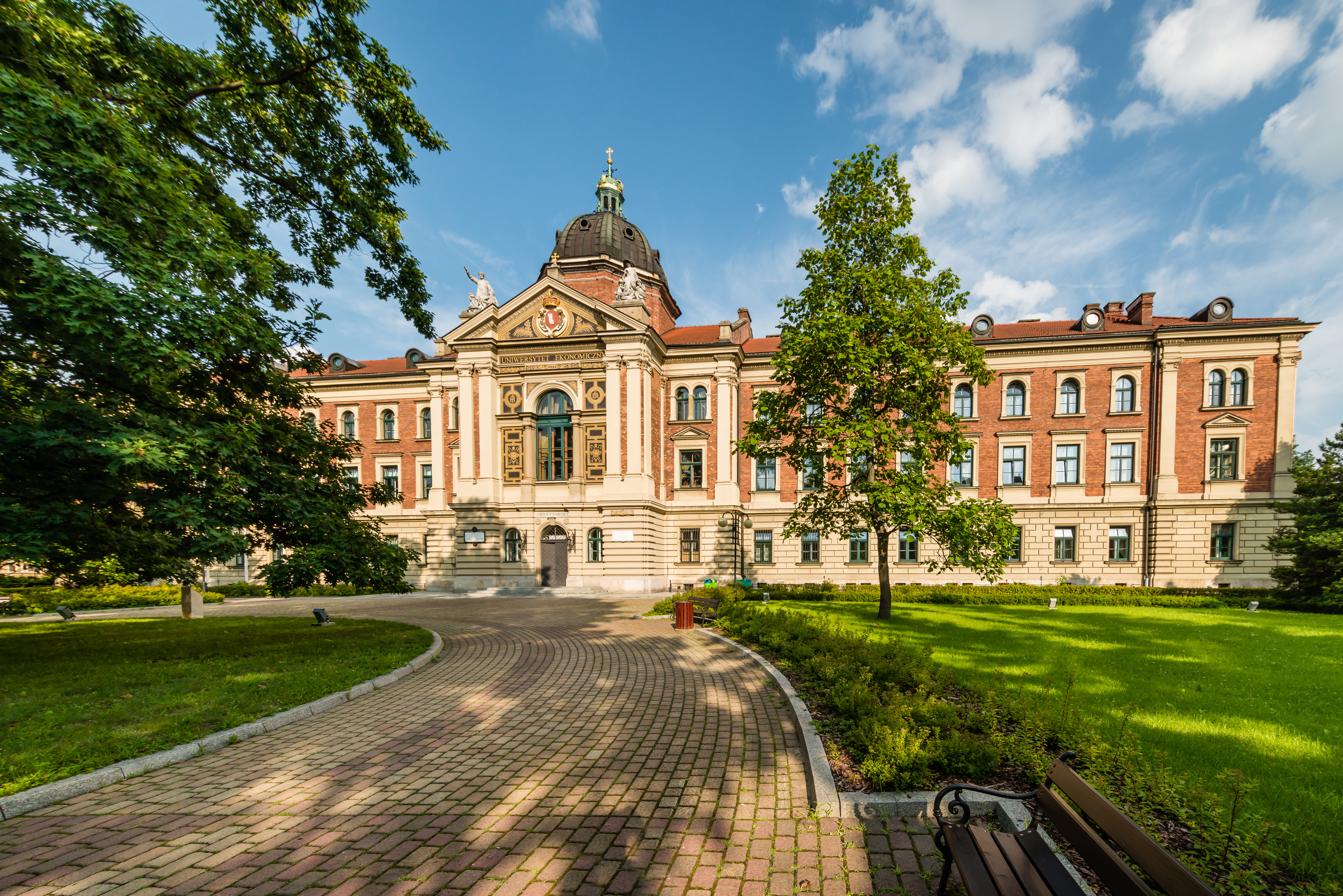
Kraków University of Economics

Kraków is a major centre of education. Twenty-four institutions of higher education offer courses in the city, with more than 200,000 students. Jagiellonian University, the oldest university in Poland and ranked by the Times Higher Education Supplement as the second-best university in the country, was founded in 1364 as Studium Generale and renamed in 1817 to commemorate the royal Jagiellonian dynasty of Poland and Lithuania. Its principal academic asset is the Jagiellonian Library, with more than 4 million volumes, including a large collection of medieval manuscripts like Copernicus' De Revolutionibus and the Balthasar Behem Codex. With 42,325 students (2005) and 3,605 academic staff, the Jagiellonian University is also one of the leading research centres in Poland. Famous historical figures connected with the university include Saint John Cantius, Jan Długosz, Nicolaus Copernicus, Andrzej Frycz Modrzewski, Jan Kochanowski, King John III Sobieski, Pope John Paul II and Nobel laureates Ivo Andrić and Wisława Szymborska.

AGH University of Science and Technology, established in 1919, is the largest technical university in Poland, with more than 15 faculties and student enrollment exceeding 30,000. It was ranked by the Polish edition of Newsweek as the best technical university in the country in 2004. During its 80-year history, more than 73,000 students graduated from AGH with master's or bachelor's degrees. Some 3,600 persons were granted the degree of Doctor of Science, and about 900 obtained the qualification of Doctor habilitatus.

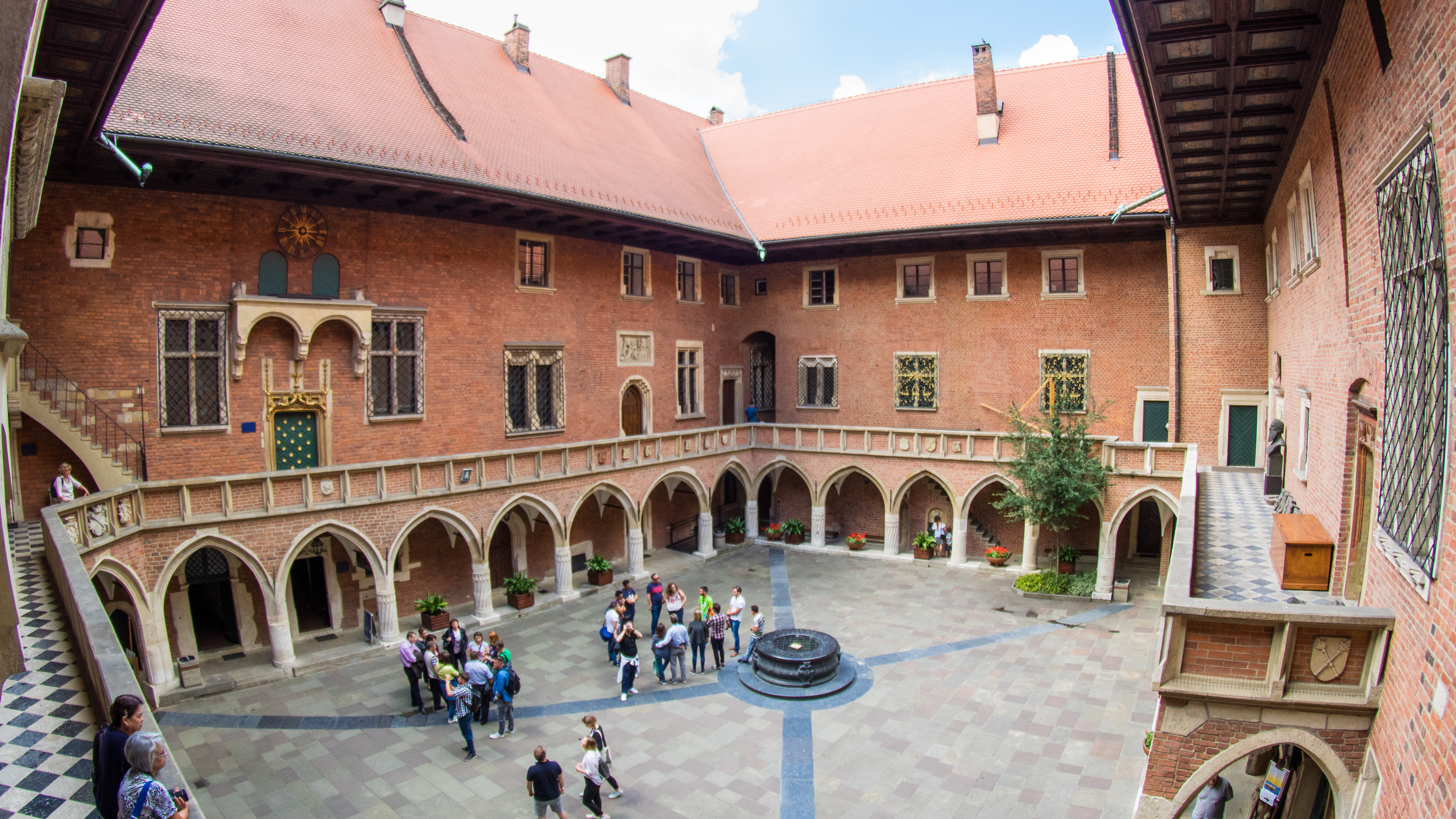
Collegium Maius, Jagiellonian University's oldest building

Other institutions of higher learning include Academy of Music in Kraków first conceived as conservatory in 1888, one of the oldest and most prestigious conservatories in Central Europe and a major concert venue; Kraków University of Economics, established in 1925; Pedagogical University, in operation since 1946; Agricultural University of Kraków, offering courses since 1890 (initially as a part of Jagiellonian University); Academy of Fine Arts, the oldest Fine Arts Academy in Poland, founded by the Polish painter Jan Matejko; Ludwik Solski Academy for the Dramatic Arts; The Pontifical Academy of Theology; AGH University of Science and Technology and Kraków University of Technology, which has more than 37,000 graduates.

Scientific societies and their branches in Kraków conduct scientific and educational work in local and countrywide scale. The Academy of Learning, Association of Law Students' Library of the Jagiellonian University, Polish Copernicus Society of Naturalists and the Polish Section of Institute of Electrical and Electronics Engineers all have their main seats in Kraków.

== Culture ==
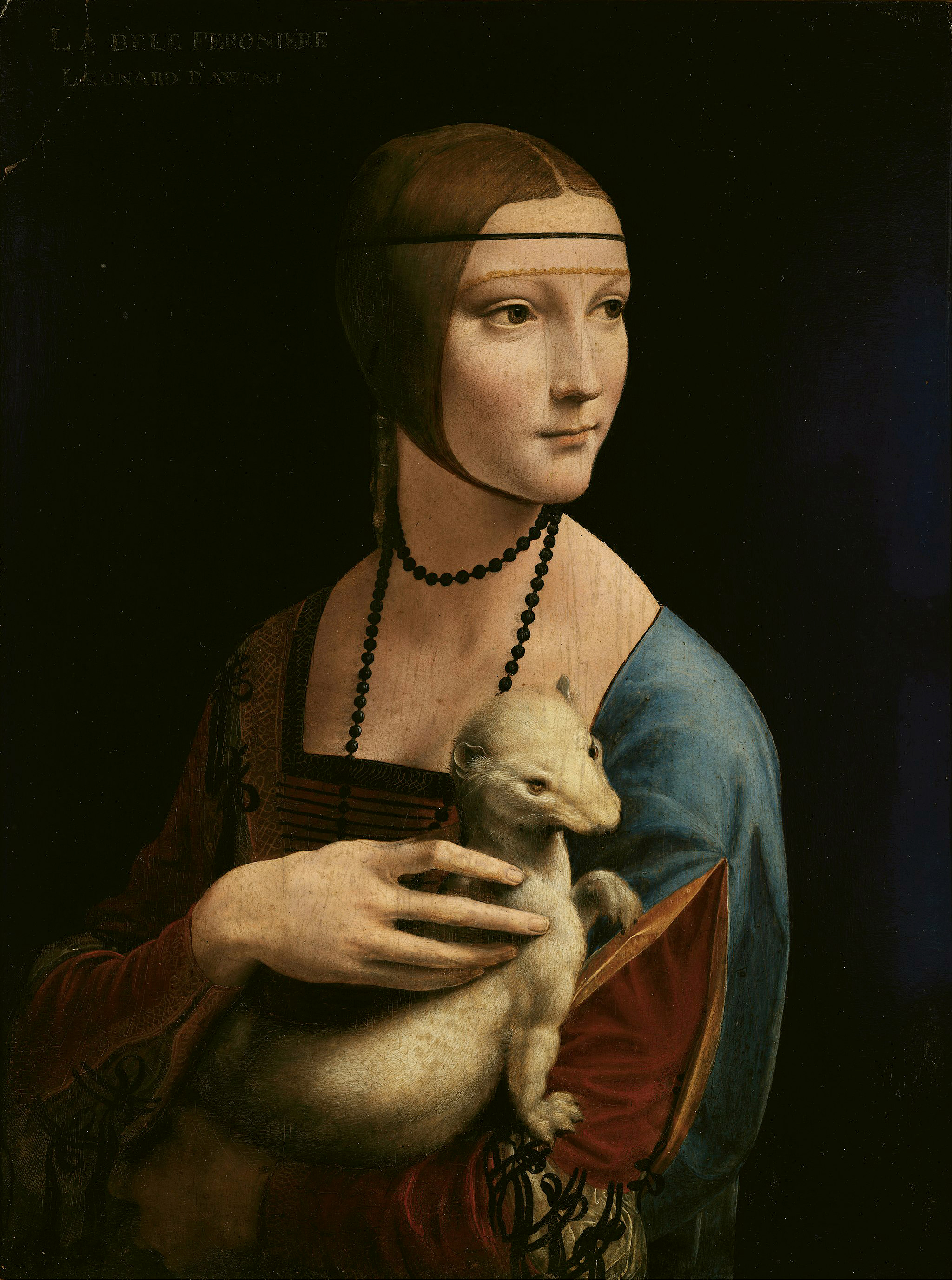
Leonardo da Vinci's Lady with an Ermine, at the Czartoryski Museum

Kraków was named the official European Capital of Culture for the year 2000 by the European Union. Major landmarks include the Main Square with St Mary's Basilica and the Sukiennice Cloth Hall, the Wawel Castle, the National Art Museum, the Sigismund Bell at the Wawel Cathedral, and the medieval St Florian's Gate with the Barbican along the Royal Coronation Route. Among them is the Czartoryski Museum featuring works by Leonardo da Vinci, Holbein and Rembrandt as well as the Archaeological Museum of Kraków whose collection highlights include the Zbruch Idol and the Bronocice Pot.

The Lajkonik, a bearded man dressed as a khan on a hobby horse, is a prominent element of intangible cultural heritage associated with Kraków. The tradition dates back to folklore surrounding the 13th-century Mongol invasion, when the local timber raftsmen successfully repelled a siege on the village of Zwierzyniec. The raftsmen subsequently entered Kraków wearing the captured attire of the Mongol commander as a victory demonstration. The ritual procession accompanied by musicians takes place annually eight days after the Feast of Corpus Christi. The oldest written records of the performance date to the mid-18th century and the ritual has been maintained continuously as an expression of civic identity.

A trumpet call (hejnał mariacki) is sounded every hour from St Mary's Basilica in the Market Square. The melody, which used to announce the opening and closing of city gates, ends unexpectedly in midstream. According to legend, the tune was played during the Mongol invasion by a guard warning citizens against the attack. Whilst playing, he was shot by an archer of the invading forces and the bugle call broke off at the moment he died. The story is recounted in Eric P. Kelly's 1928 book The Trumpeter of Krakow, which won a Newbery Award.

The city also maintains a rich culinary history, with obwarzanek krakowski and the bagel originating in Kraków. Obwarzanek, a braided, ring-shaped bread product, holds a distinct status in European culinary heritage, protected under the European Union's Protected Geographical Indication (PGI) framework.

=== Museums and national art galleries ===
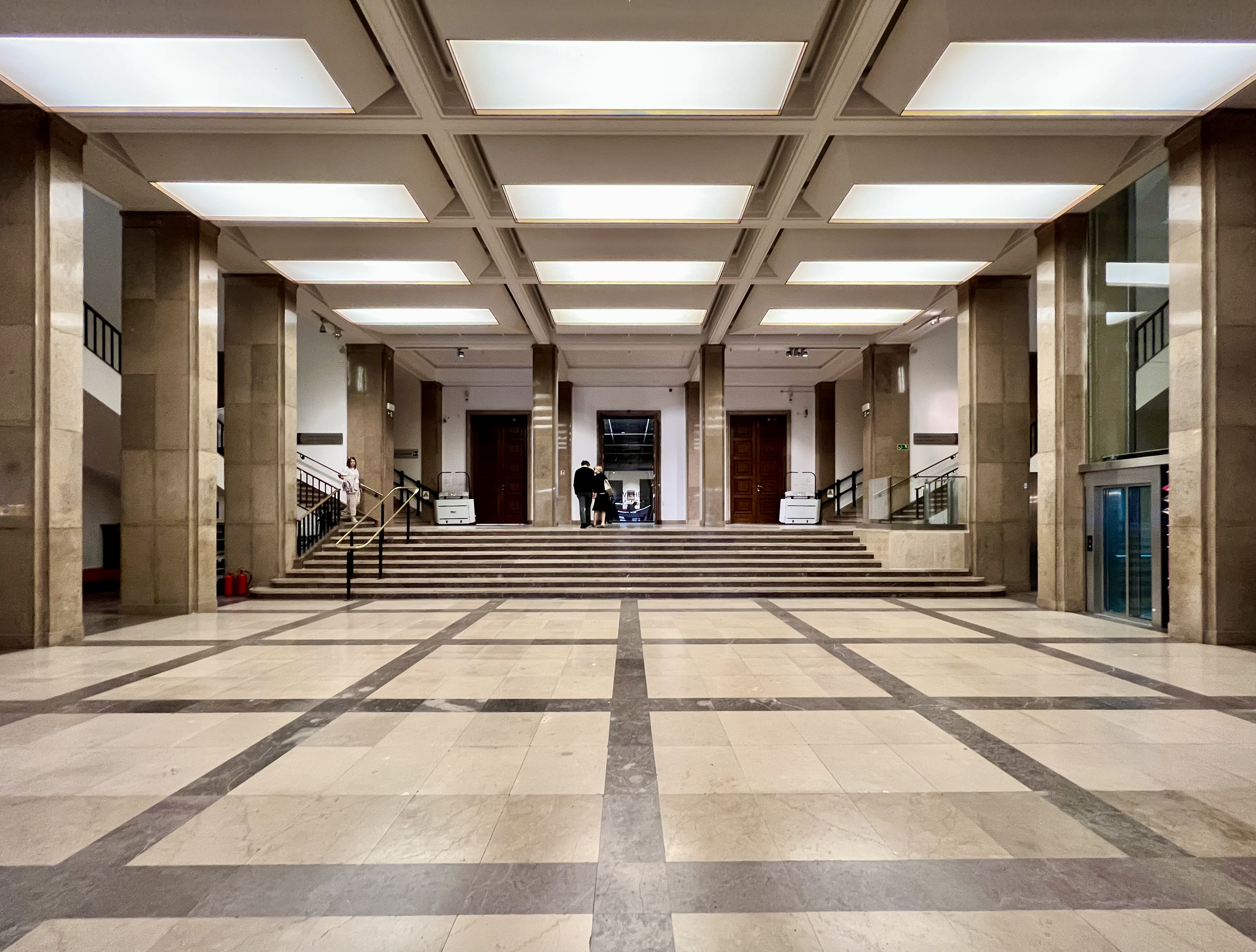
The National Museum in Kraków is one of Poland's finest galleries of art.

As of 2023, Kraków hosts approximately 82 museums and various museum branches; the city also has a number of art collections and public art galleries. The National Museum, established in 1879, as well as the National Art Collection on Wawel Hill, are all accessible to the general public.

The Royal Chambers at Wawel feature art, period furniture, Polish and European paintings, collectibles, and a major collection of 16th-century monumental Flemish tapestries. Wawel Treasury and Armoury features Polish royal memorabilia, jewels, applied art, and 15th- to 18th-century arms. The Wawel Eastern Collection features Turkish tents and military accessories. The National Museum holds the largest body of artworks in the country with collections consisting of several hundred thousand items kept mostly in the Main Building at 3 Maja Street, although there are eleven other separate divisions of the museum in the city, one of the most popular being the Gallery of 19th Century Polish Art at Sukiennice which houses a collection of some of the best-known paintings and sculptures of the Young Poland movement. Inaugurated in 2013, the latest division of the National Museum is the Europeum, with works by Brueghel among a hundred Western European paintings.

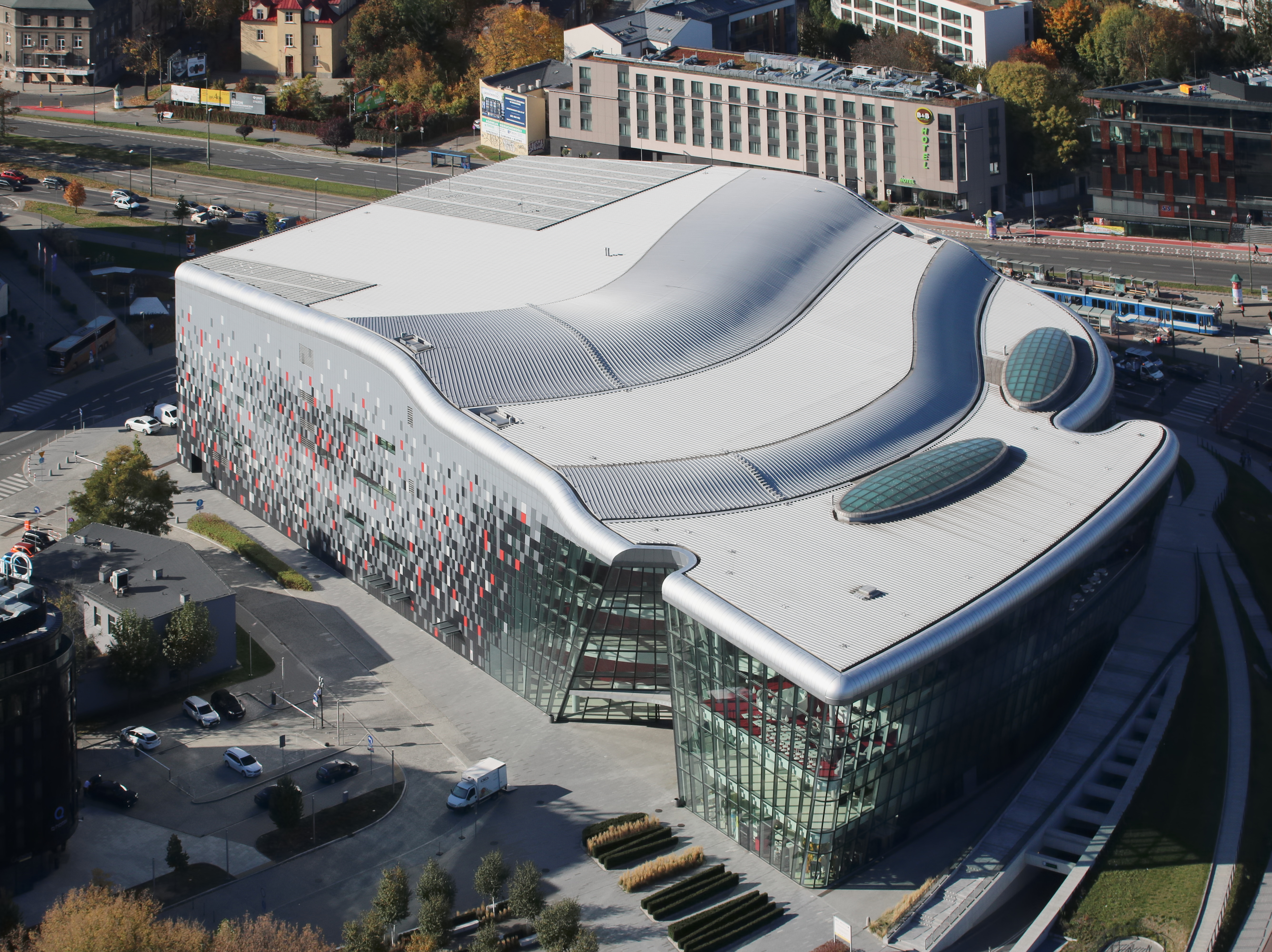
Kraków Congress Centre, the city's business and cultural flagship

Other notable museums in Kraków include the Manggha Museum of Japanese Art and Technology (at M. Konopnickiej 26), Stanisław Wyspiański Museum (at 11 Szczepanska St), Jan Matejko Manor House in Krzesławice, the Emeryk Hutten-Czapski Museum, devoted to the master painter and his life, and Józef Mehoffer Manor.

The Rynek Underground museum, situated under the city's main square, showcases Kraków's more than 1,000-year history through its streets, activities and artifacts. The construction of the museum was preceded by extensive excavations starting in 2005, and continuing eventually until 2010, as more and more physical evidence was uncovered.

The Polish Aviation Museum, considered one of the world's best aviation museums by CNN, features over 200 aircraft including a Sopwith Camel among other First World War biplanes, a comprehensive display of aero engines, and a complete collection of airplane types developed by Poland after 1945. Activities of smaller museums around Kraków and in the Lesser Poland region are promoted and supported by the Małopolska Institute of Culture, which organises annual Małopolska Heritage Days.

=== Performing arts ===
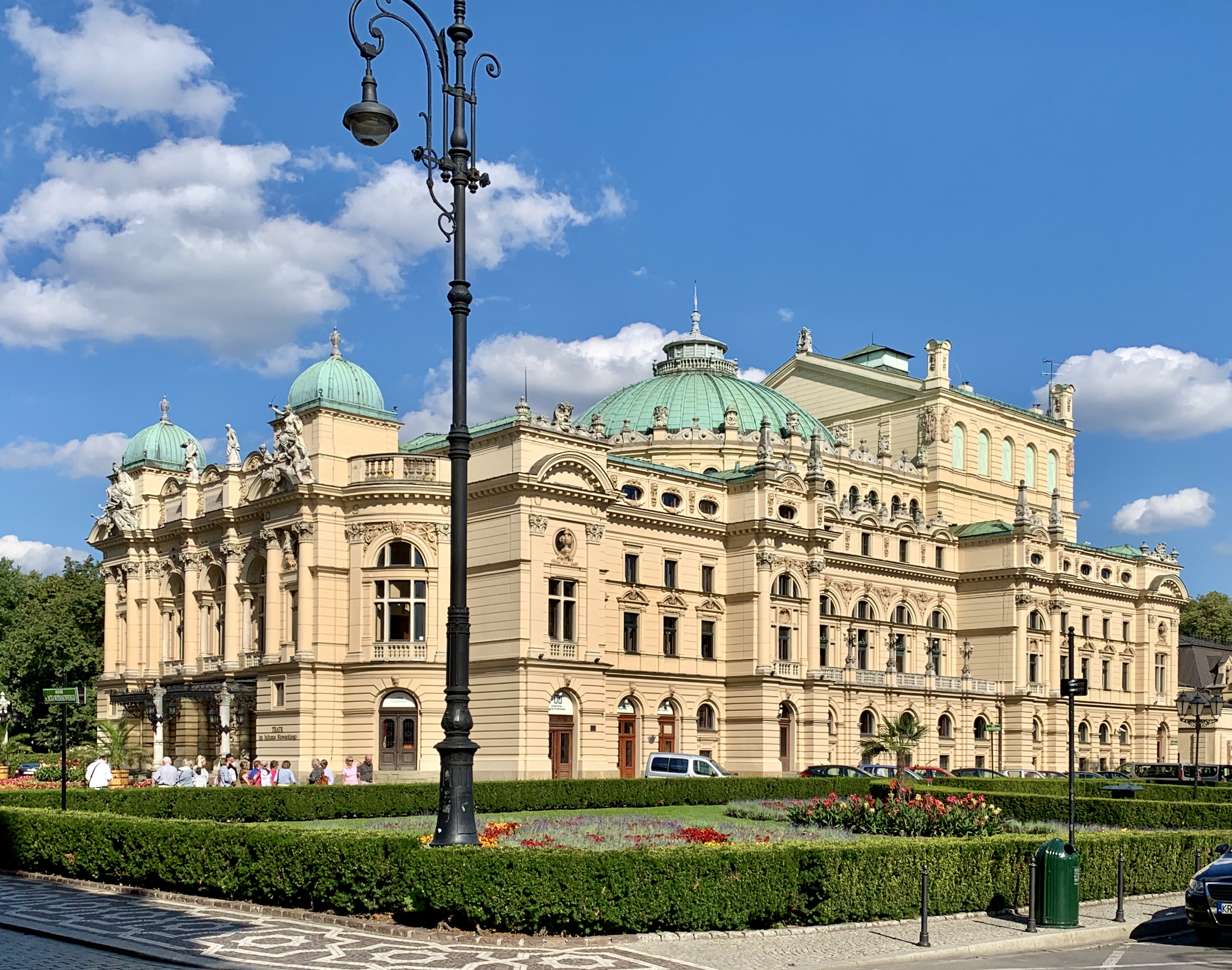
Kraków's Juliusz Słowacki Theatre

The city has several famous theatres, including the Narodowy Stary Teatr (the National Old Theatre), the Juliusz Słowacki Theatre, the Bagatela Theatre, the Ludowy Theatre, and the Groteska Theatre of Puppetry, as well as the Opera Krakowska and Kraków Operetta. The city's principal concert hall and the home of the Kraków Philharmonic Orchestra is the Kraków Philharmonic (Filharmonia Krakowska) built in 1931.

Kraków hosts many annual and biannual artistic events, some of international significance such as the Misteria Paschalia (Baroque music), Sacrum-Profanum (contemporary music), the Kraków Screen Festival (popular music), the Festival of Polish Music (classical music), Dedications (theatre), the Kraków Film Festival (one of Europe's oldest short films events), Etiuda&Anima International Film Festival (the oldest international art-film event in Poland), Biennial of Graphic Arts, and the Jewish Culture Festival. Kraków was the residence of two Polish Nobel laureates in literature, Wisława Szymborska and Czesław Miłosz; a third Nobel laureate, the Yugoslav writer Ivo Andrić, lived and studied in Kraków. Other former longtime residents include internationally renowned Polish film directors Andrzej Wajda and Roman Polanski, both of whom are Academy Award winners.

=== Music ===
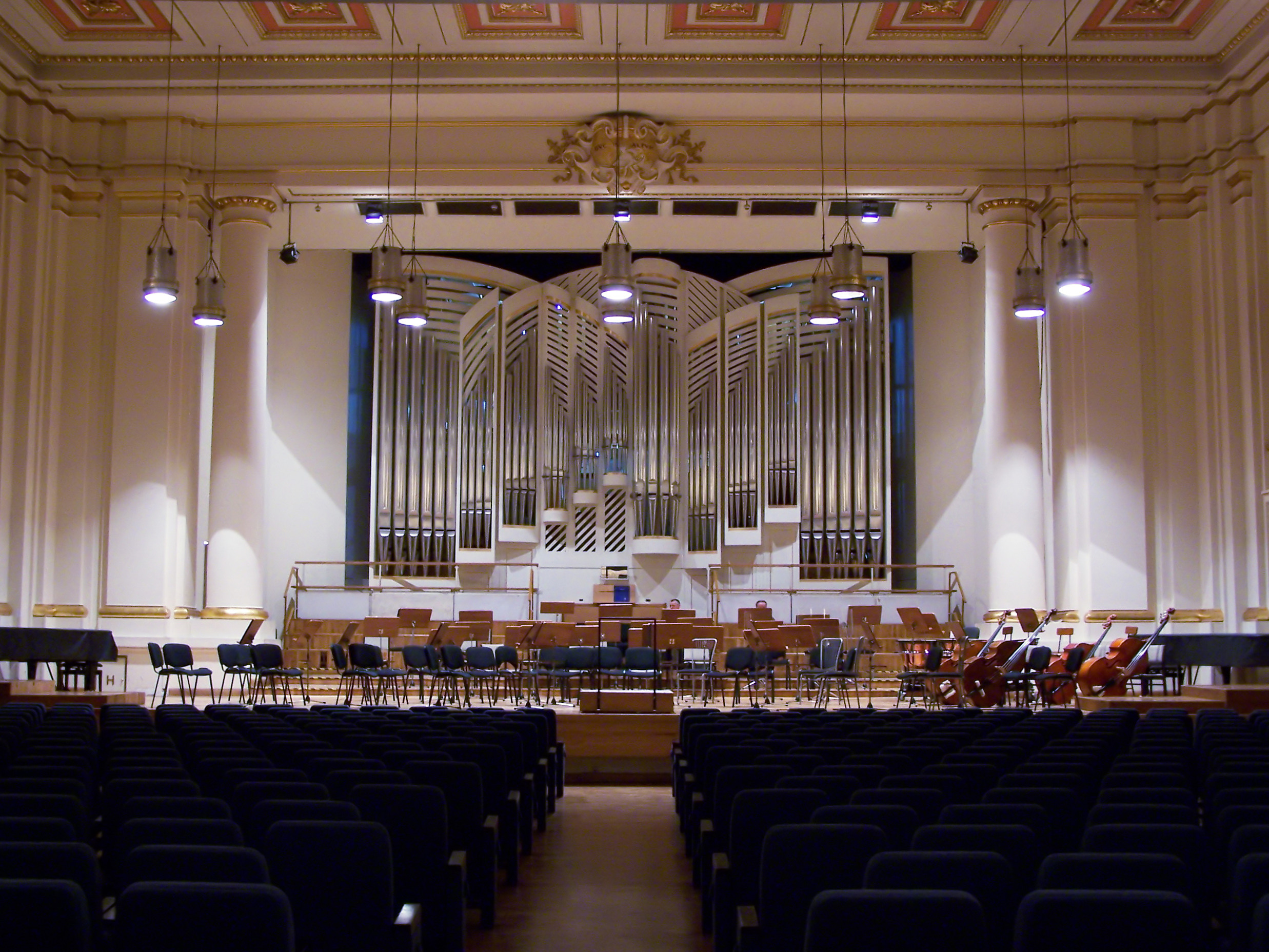
Concert hall of the Kraków Philharmonic

Opera Krakowska one of the leading national opera companies, stages 200 performances each year including ballet, operettas and musicals. It has, in its main repertoire, the greatest world and Polish opera classics. The Opera moved into its first permanent House in the autumn of 2008. It is in charge also of the Summer Festival of Opera and Operetta.

Kraków is home to two major Polish festivals of early music presenting forgotten Baroque oratorios and operas: Opera Rara, and Misteria Paschalia. Meanwhile, Capella Cracoviensis runs the Music in Old Krakow International Festival.

Academy of Music in Kraków, founded in 1888, is known worldwide as the alma mater of the contemporary Polish composer Krzysztof Penderecki and it is also the only one in Poland to have two winners of the International Chopin Competition in Warsaw among its alumni. The academy organises concerts of its students and guests throughout the whole year.

Music organisations and venues include: Kraków Philharmonic, Sinfonietta Cracovia (a.k.a. the Orchestra of the Royal City of Kraków), the Polish Radio Choir of Kraków, Organum Academic Choir, the Mixed Mariański Choir (Mieszany Chór Mariański), Kraków Academic Choir of the Jagiellonian University, the Kraków Chamber Choir, Amar Corde String Quartet, Consortium Iagellonicum Baroque Orchestra of the Jagiellonian University, Brass Band of T. Sendzimir Steelworks, and Camerata Chamber Orchestra of Radio Kraków.

== Tourism ==
According to official statistics, in 2019 Kraków was visited by over 14 million tourists including 3.3 million foreign travellers. The visitors spent over 7.5 billion zloty (ca. €1.7 billion) in the city (without travel costs and pre-booked accommodation). Most foreign tourists came from Germany (14.2%), United Kingdom (13.9%), Italy (11.5%), France (11.2%), Spain (10.4%) and Ukraine (5.4%). The Kraków tour-guide from the Lesser Poland Visitors Bureau indicated that not all statistics are recorded due to the considerable number of those who come, staying in readily available private rooms paid for by cash, especially from Eastern Europe.

The main reasons for visiting the city are: its historical monuments, recreation as well as relatives and friends (placing third in the ranking), religion and business. There are 120 quality hotels in Kraków (usually about half full) offering 15,485 overnight accommodations. The average stay lasts for about 4 to 7 nights. The survey conducted among the travelers showed that they enjoyed the city's friendliness most, with 90% of Polish tourists and 87% foreigners stating that they would recommend visiting it. Notable points of interest outside the city include the Wieliczka Salt Mine, the Tatra Mountains 100 km (62 mi) to the south, the historic city of Częstochowa (north-west), the well-preserved former Nazi concentration camp at Auschwitz, and Ojcowski National Park, which includes the Renaissance Castle at Pieskowa Skała. Kraków has been awarded a number of top international rankings such as the 1st place in the Top city-break destinations 2014 survey conducted by the British consumer association Which?.

== Sports ==
Football is the most popular sport in the city. The two football teams with the largest following are thirteen-time Polish champion Wisła Kraków, and five-time champion Cracovia, both founded in 1906 as the oldest still existing in Poland. They have been involved in the most intense rivalry in the country and one of the most intense in all of Europe, known as the Holy War (Święta Wojna). Other football clubs include Hutnik Kraków, Wawel Kraków, Wieczysta Kraków and one-time Polish champion Garbarnia Kraków. There is also the first-league rugby club Juvenia Kraków. Kraków has a number of additional, equally valued sports teams including twelve-time Polish ice hockey champions Cracovia and the twenty-time women's basketball champions Wisła Kraków. The Cracovia Marathon, with thousands of participants from two dozen countries annually, has been held in the city since 2002.

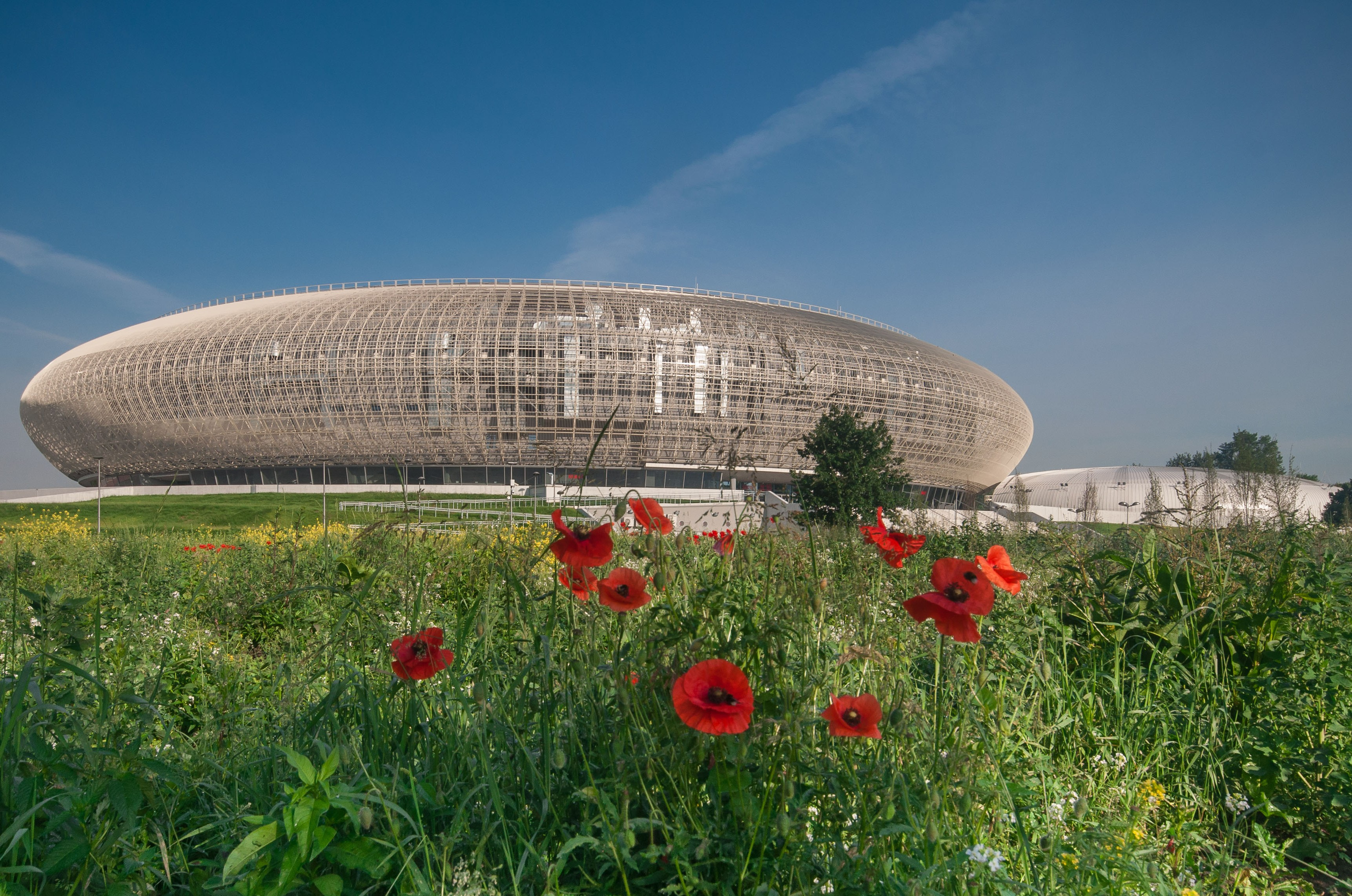
Tauron Arena Kraków

The construction of a new Tauron Arena Kraków began in May 2010; for concerts, indoor athletics, hockey, basketball, futsal and other events. The facility has an area of 61,434 m^{2}, with a maximum arena court area of 4,546 m^{2}. The average capacity is 18,000 for concerts, and 15,000 for sport events, with the maximum number of spectators being 22,000. The Arena boasts Poland's largest LED media façade, with a total surface of 5,200 m^{2} of LED strip lighting, wrapping around the stadium, and one of Europe's largest LED screens, measuring over 540 m^{2}.

Kraków was the host city of the 2014 FIVB Men's Volleyball World Championship and 2016 European Men's Handball Championship. It was also selected as the European City of Sport for 2014. Kraków was bidding to host the 2022 Winter Olympics with Jasná but the bid was rejected by a majority (69.72%) of the vote in a referendum on 16 May 2014. Krakow and the Malopolska region hosted the 2023 European Games from 21 June to 2 July 2023. More than 7,000 athletes representing 49 countries participated.

== International relations ==
=== Consulates ===
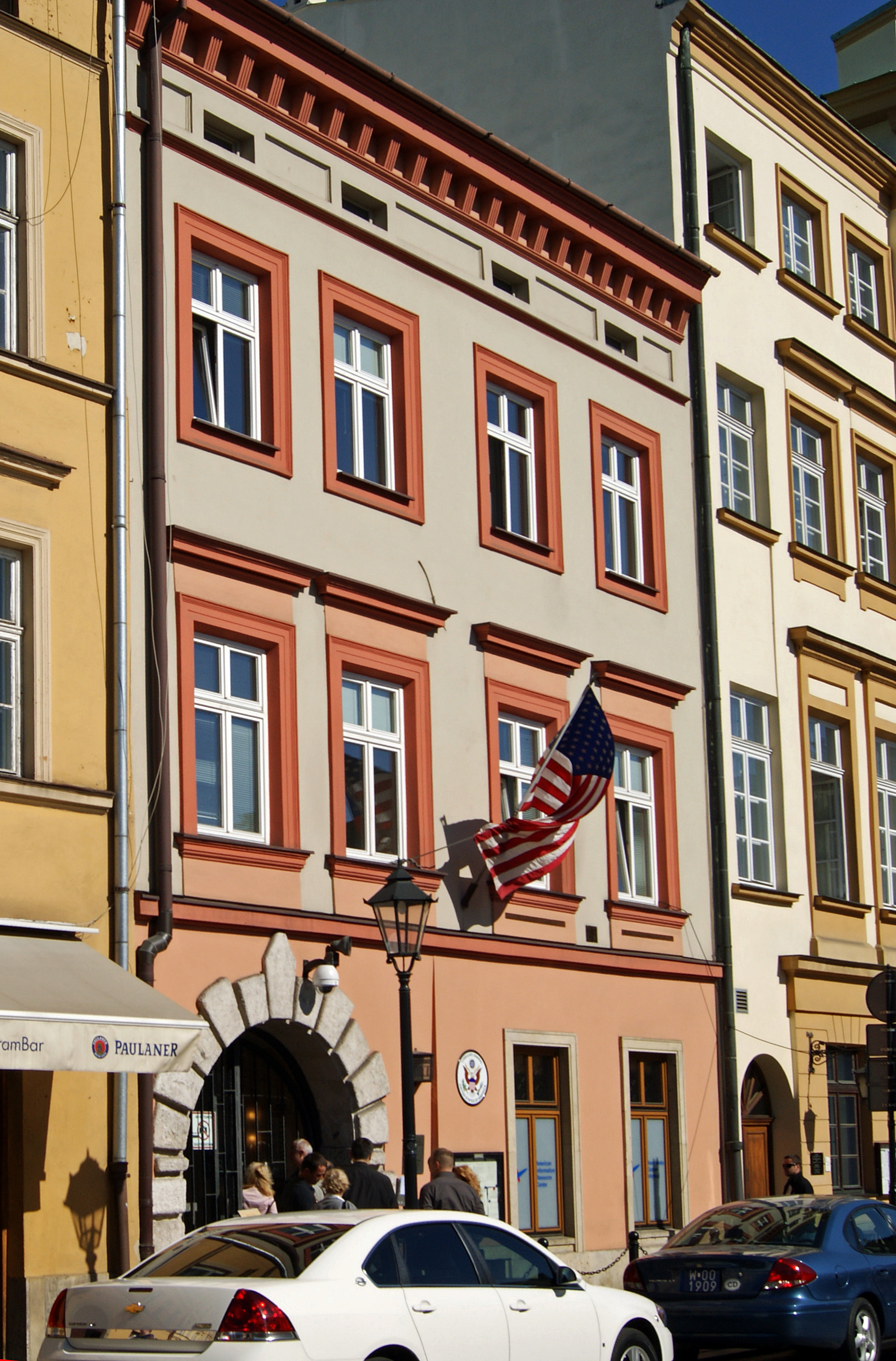
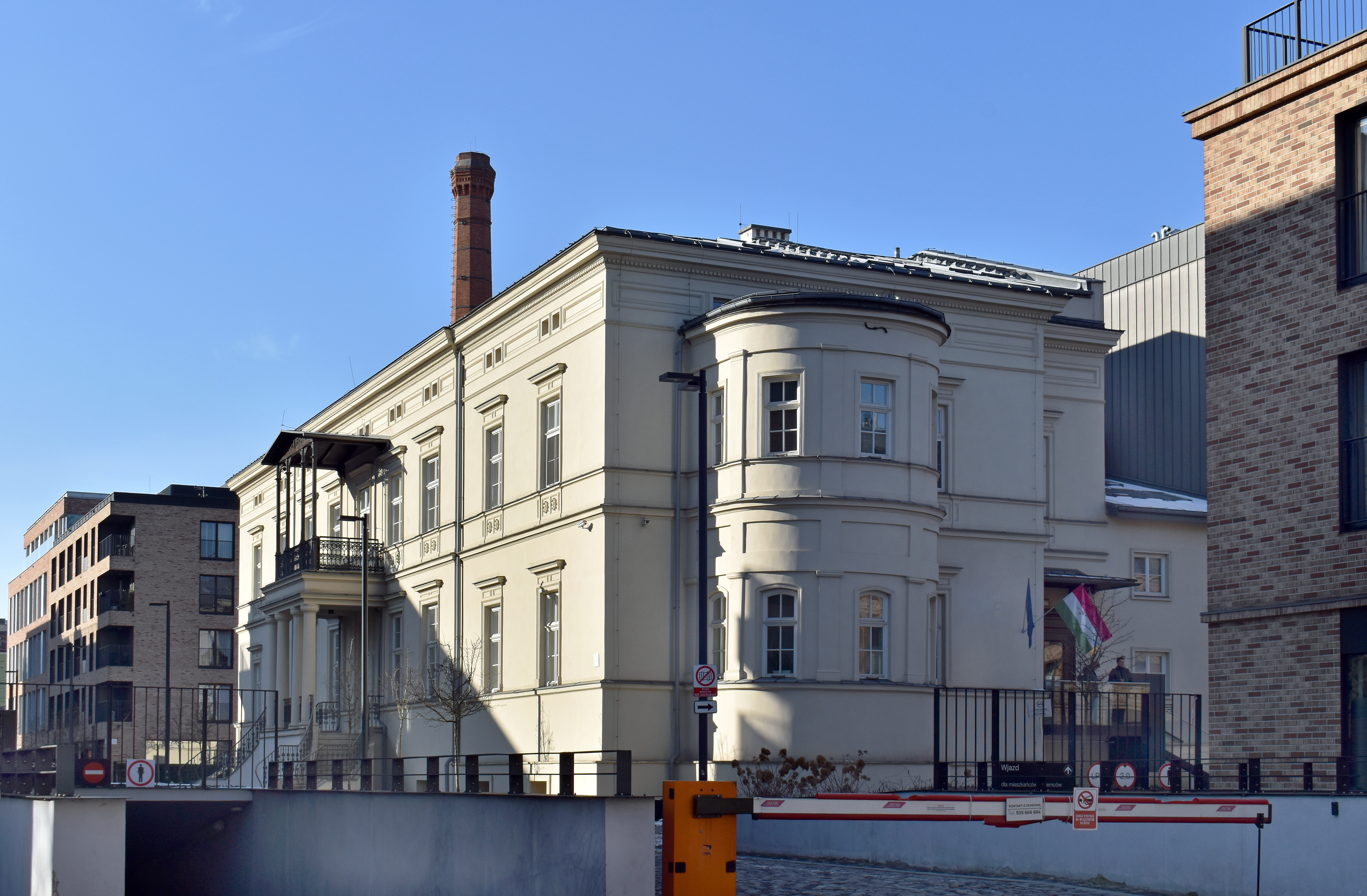
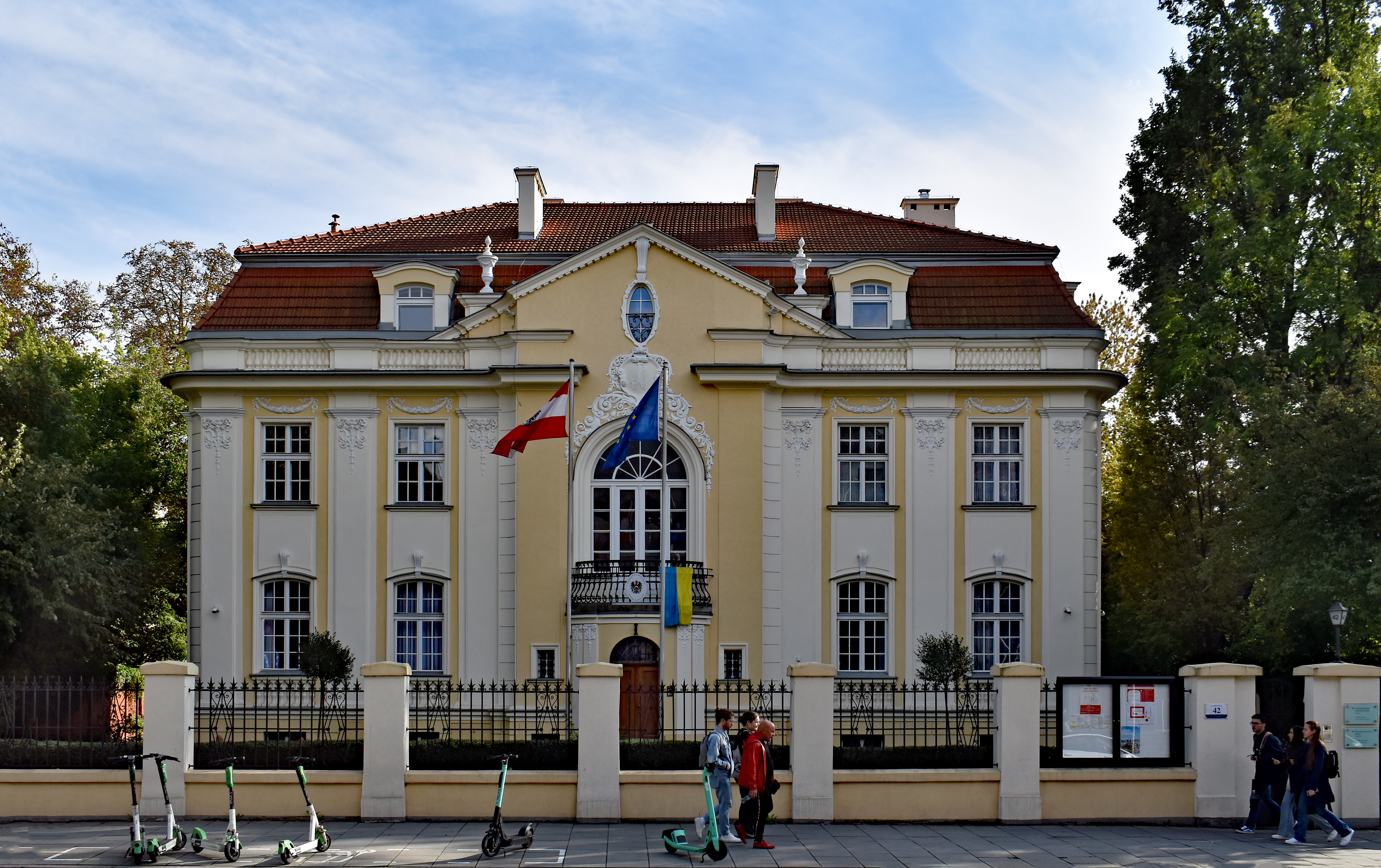
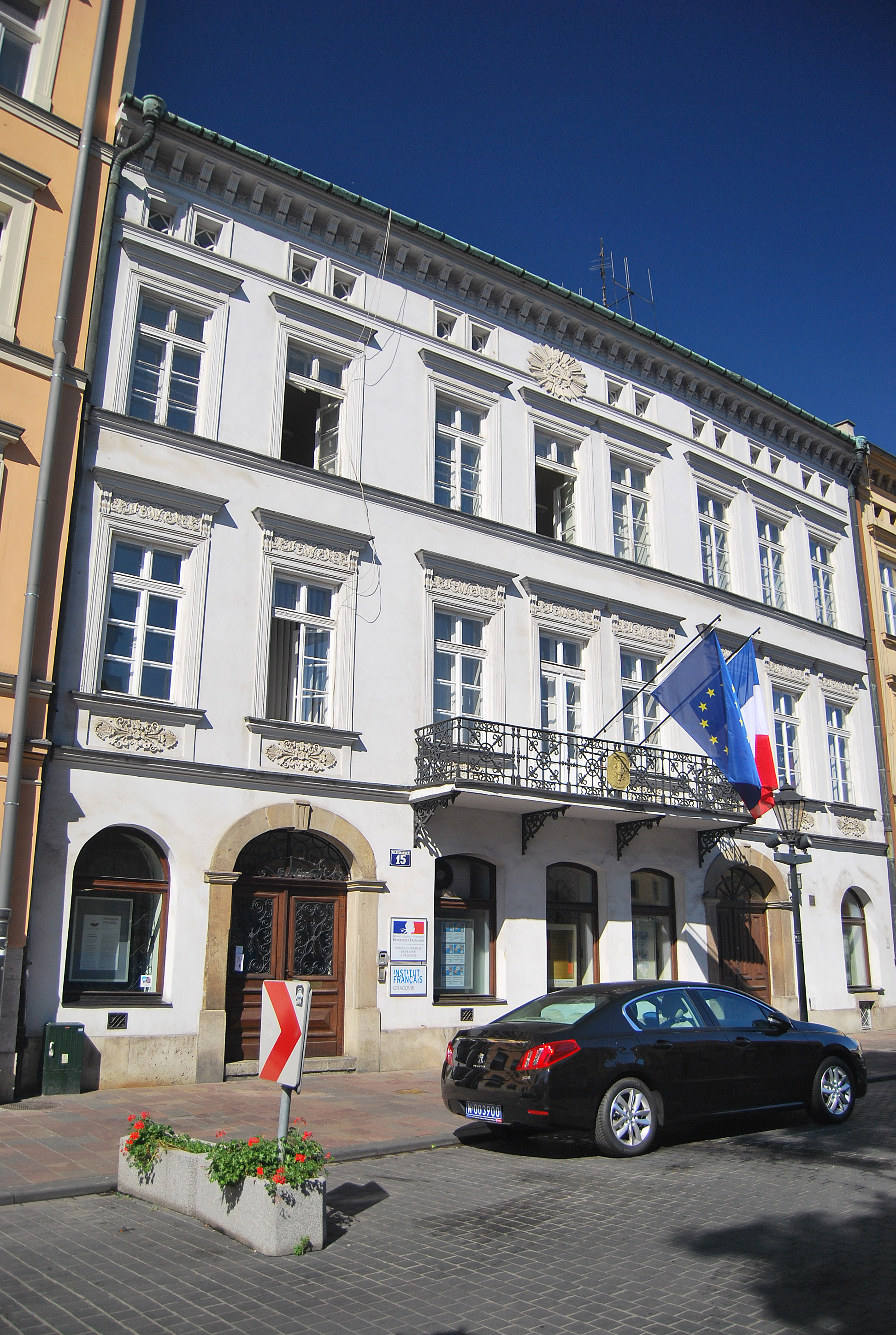
From top, left to right: consulates general of the United States, Hungary, Austria and France

There are eight consulates general in Kraków – Austria, France, Germany, Hungary, Russia, Slovakia, Ukraine, United States, three honorary consulates general – India, Japan, Turkey, 24 honorary consulates – Belgium, Bulgaria, Chile, Colombia, Croatia, Denmark, Estonia, Finland, Iceland, Indonesia, Italy, Latvia, Lithuania, Luxembourg, Mexico, Mongolia, Netherlands, Norway, Pakistan, Peru, Romania, Spain, Sweden, Uruguay, and a Representative of the Government of Kurdistan Region.

=== Twin towns and sister cities ===
Kraków is twinned with 36 cities...:

- Batu, Indonesia (2000)
- Bordeaux, France (1993)
- Bratislava, Slovakia
- Budapest, Hungary (2005)
- Cambridge, Massachusetts, US (1989)
- Curitiba, Brazil (1993)
- Cusco, Peru
- Edinburgh, Scotland (1995)
- Fes, Morocco (2004)
- Florence, Italy (1992)
- Frankfurt, Germany (1991)
- Gothenburg, Sweden (1990)
- Guadalajara, Mexico
- Innsbruck, Austria (1998)
- Kyiv, Ukraine (1993)
- La Serena, Chile (1995)
- Leipzig, Germany (1995)
- Leuven, Belgium (1991)
- Lviv, Ukraine (1995)
- Malang, Indonesia (1997)
- Milan, Italy (2003)
- Nuremberg, Germany (1991)
- Orléans, France (1992)
- Pécs, Hungary (1998)
- Quito, Ecuador
- Rochester, New York, US (1973)
- Liège, Belgium (1978)
- Rome, Italy
- San Francisco, US (2009)
- Seville, Spain (2002)
- Solothurn, Switzerland (1990)
- Split, Croatia
- Tbilisi, Georgia
- Veliko Tarnovo, Bulgaria (1975)
- Vilnius, Lithuania
- Zagreb, Croatia (1975)
- Olomouc, Czech Republic

== See also ==
- Cracow Circle Thomism – Philosophical system originating from Thomas Aquinas
- Tourism in Poland
- Lesser Poland – Historical region of Poland
- List of cities and towns in Poland
- Dworzec Główny Tunel

== Bibliography ==
- Martin C. Dean; Mel Hecker; Geoffrey P. Megargee (2012). The United States Holocaust Memorial Museum. Encyclopedia of Camps and Ghettos, 1933–1945, Volume II: Ghettos in German-Occupied Eastern Europe. Indiana University Press. ISBN 978-0-253-35599-7.
- Jane Hardy, Al Rainnie, Restructuring Krakow: Desperately Seeking Capitalism. Published 1996 by Mansell Publishing, 285 pages. Business, economics, finance. ISBN 0-7201-2231-7.
- Edward Hartwig, Kraków, with Jerzy Broszkiewicz (contributor). Published 1980, by Sport i Turystyka, 239 pages. ISBN 83-217-2321-7.
- Bolesław T. Łaszewski, Kraków: karta z dziejów dwudziestolecia. Published 1985, by Bicentennial Pub. Corp. (original from the University of Michigan), 132 pages. ISBN 0-912757-08-6.
- Longerich, Peter (2010). Holocaust – The Nazi Persecution and Murder of the Jews. Oxford University Press. ISBN 978-0-19-280436-5.
- Joanna Markin, Bogumiła Gnypowa, Kraków: The Guide. Published 1996 by Pascal Publishing, 342 pages. ISBN 83-87037-28-1.
- Tim Pepper, Andrew Beattie, Krakow. Published 2007 by Hunter Pub Inc., 160 pages. ISBN 1-84306-308-5. The book includes description of public art galleries and museums.
- Scott Simpson, Krakow. Published 2003 by Thomas Cook Publishing, 192 pages. Transport, geography, sightseeing, history, and culture. Includes weblinks CD. ISBN 1-84157-187-3.
- Simpson, Scott; Zukowska, Helena (15 April 2008). Travellers Kraków, 3rd: Guides to Destinations Worldwide (fourth ed.). Peterborough, United Kingdom: Thomas Cook Publishing. ISBN 978-1-84157-901-6.
- Dorota Wąsik, Emma Roper-Evans, Krakow. Published 2002 by Somerset. Cultural guidebook series, 160 pages. ISBN 963-00-5930-4.
- Richard Watkins, Best of Kraków, Published 2006, by Lonely Planet, 64 pages, complemented by fold-out maps. ISBN 1-74104-822-2.
