= Postal communication in the General Government =

Postal system in occupied Poland by Nazi Germany during World War II

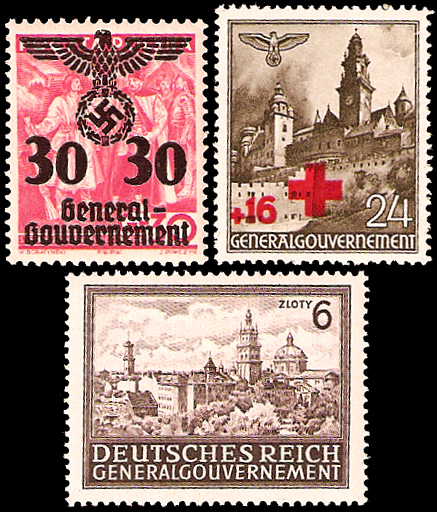
Stamps used in the General Government

Postal communication in the General Government, previously provided by the Polish Post (Poczta Polska), were taken over by the German postal service (Reichspost) after the invasion of Poland and the establishment of the General Government in 1939, and then in 1941 in additional areas of eastern Poland.

The laws and regulations that governed postal communication varied widely, depending on which group an individual belonged to, as well as where the individual was located. Postal communication in the ghettos and concentration camps were especially varied, with many locations having regulations unique to them. Despite postal service being available to all individuals in principle, in practice the ability to send and receive mail was at times either interrupted or totally stopped.

== Mail service for Non-German civilians ==
Non-Germans, which included ethnic Poles and anyone else considered to be not racially German by the Nazis, saw no restrictions to their postal communications until 1942, at which time several restrictions were introduced. General Governor Hans Frank issued the following restrictions regarding written communications: non-Germans were limited to a maximum of two letters per month, each letter was limited to a maximum of two pages in length (this restriction was not applied to postcards), and communication were only permitted with friendly countries, though in some cases communication with the outside world was available via neutral countries. In addition to these restrictions, an additional regulation was introduced requiring the full name and address of the sender to appear on all pages of the letter to assist with Nazi censorship efforts.

== Deutsche Post Osten ==
DPO was a German postal service in part of German-occupied Poland known as Generalgouvernement. The Post took over assets of Polska Poczta, Telegraf i Telefon in 1939. The Post employed Germans, Volksdeutsche and Poles. The post used at the beginning both Polish and German stamps with Deutsche Post Osten and Generalgouvernement overprints, later its own stamps. Its president was Richard Lauxmann.

The Deutsche Post Osten serviced ghettos in GG till 1941. Later Judenrats took over the service.

The DPO has published Official Phone Book for General Government.

== Ghettos ==
In the ghettos established by Nazi occupying forces after the invasion of Poland, the duty of setting up a ghetto post office and mail service often fell to the local Judenrat. The administration of the ghettos varied from ghetto to ghetto across the General Government, and so did the availability of mail service within them. While most ghettos did have some postal service, some did not for unknown reasons.

In many ghettos the transfer from a local mail service to one provided by the Judenrat was not immediate. As many cities occupied by the Nazis began to refuse to provide mail service to Jews, the transfer to a systematic process within the ghetto was a gradual process. The post offices established in the ghettos also provided a source of employment for the Jews living within. In Łódź (annected to Reich) the post office employed 139 Jews by December 1940, and in the Warsaw ghetto the two post offices established employed 94 Jews by January 1941.

In the Warsaw ghetto, an agreement regarding the exchange of mail leaving and entering the ghetto was reached and was then applied to all ghettos within the General Government. Adam Czerniakow, the head of the Warsaw Judenrat, and the director of Post Office No. C-I, agreed that the Judenrat would handle all mail within the ghetto (coming in to and leaving) and that the Germans would establish a special post office (Postaustauschstelle) for use in exchanging letters and parcels further on.

The post offices in the ghettos also provided a source of income for the local Judenrat, as these councils were also responsible for other public services within the ghetto. This however was often a point of conflict in the ghettos, as the cost of postage often saw a surcharge raising its price to near double the rate outside the ghettos.

The ghettos, and along with them the mail service within, were often subject to the whims of the German occupiers. As German resettlement and deportation plans intensified following the invasion of the Soviet Union, so too did disruptions and in some places suspensions of the mail service. Stoppages in post also corresponded with intensification of Nazi ideology. For example, in Krakow, the exchange of parcels to and from Jews was suspended for sanitation reasons.

== Concentration camps ==
Postal communication, while subject to many regulations, was allowed to inmates in the concentration camps. The regulations placed upon those living in the concentration camps were outlined by Theodor Eicke during his time as the commandant of the Dachau concentration camp. Prisoners were only able to write letters on pre-provided postcards within the camps and were forbidden from writing outside the lines of the postcard. Additionally, inmates had to provide their full name, date of birth, and location within the camp in the address. Beyond their given names, inmates were required to identify themselves as Jewish by adding Israel to their name for males, and Sara for females. In addition to these explicit regulations, prisoners were also often obliged to include the line “I am in good health and everything is fine here” in their postcards. For both the senders and responders to these letters, the only acceptable written language was German. After sending, any letters would be subject to strict censorship by both the camp post office, and the High Command of the Wehrmacht (OKW).

Printed on all pre-provided postcards were additional rules regarding the frequency with which letters could be exchanged, as well as what was allowed to be sent along with the letter. These additional rules and regulations are known as Eicke's Regulation and applied to prisoners in all concentration camps. While these regulations would have been intended for use across all camps, their application and enforcement was up to the local SS officials, and as a result were not always implemented uniformly.

=== Text of Section VII of Eicke's Regulation ===
1. During the month every person interned is allowed to receive or send two letters or two postcards from/to relatives. Letters addressed to prisoners are to be legible and written in ink with fifteen lines per page. They are to be of normal size. The envelopes are to have an inside lining and not more than five 12 Pfg. stamps are to be enclosed. Everything else is forbidden and subject to confiscation. Only ten lines are allowed for postcards. Photographs are not to be sent as postcards.
2. Money is not allowed to be sent.
3. It is to be kept in mind that for dispatching money as well as normal correspondence it is necessary to indicate... name, date of birth and matriculation number of the prisoner. If this data is not clear the post office will see to the return to the sender or to the destruction of the correspondence.
4. Newspapers are allowed but they can only be reserved at the camp post office.
5. Dispatching of parcels is not allowed inasmuch as the interned is able to buy everything needed in the camp.
6. Requests to the security authority of the camp for release are useless.
7. Permissions to talk to or visit prisoners in the camp are absolutely forbidden.
