= Stanisław Rehman =

Polish politician (1838–1899)

Stanisław Rehman (1838–1899), was a city councillor in Kraków, Poland. In 1885 Rehman founded a city park known as Park Krakowski. The park was built on the grounds leased from the military and opened for the public in 1887. The park was modelled on similar parks in Vienna. After World War I its area was reduced to 5 ha, due to rapid real estate development.

The park was originally equipped with a concert bowl, an ice and bicycle rink, a swimming pool, a bowling alley, a restaurant, cafés, a summer theatre (since 1890), and a zoo. It was a popular destination point with many Fin de siècle Cracovians.

== See also ==
- Culture of Kraków

== Bibliography ==
Ryszard Burek, Encyklopedia Krakowa, 2000, ISBN 83-01-13325-2
