= Money transfers in the General Government =

The General Government was the German zone of occupation in Poland after the invasion by Nazi Germany and the Soviet Union in 1939, at the start of World War II. The General Government represented the middle portion of occupied Poland, with originally the West being under German control and the East under Soviet control. The basis for this split was to eliminate the Polish state and to turn all Polish nationals as stateless subjects, disregarding international law.

The administration of the General Government was run exclusively by German officials. There was no national Polish influence. The purpose of this was to reduce the status of the Polish nationals to virtual serfdom. This was one of the first steps toward ethnic cleansing in Poland. Hans Frank, the first General-Governor, told Adolf Hitler that his intention with the occupation was to make it a completely German-occupied area within the next 10 to 15 years. "Where 12 million Poles now live, is to be populated by 4 to 5 million Germans," said Frank.

There were many different plans formulated for the fate of the Poles living in German-occupied Poland. Among the most common were calls for deportations of the Polish population to Western Siberia. However, in most cases "deportation" was a euphemism for execution of the Polish population.

In the meantime, all educational institutions, besides primary schools, and cultural centres were closed in Poland to exclude Polish nationals from cultural, intellectual, and economic life in the General Government.

The General Government had no international recognition and also did not allow Polish nationals any representation. This gave the General Government a lot of freedom to implement their own policies without consequence. Because of this freedom, many of the basic rights of Polish nationals were violated, their property rights among them.

== Polish economy ==
Forced labor was expected of Jews and Polish nationals living in the General Government after the invasion of Poland in 1939. These laborers were deported to Germany where they worked on German farms and in German factories.

Polish citizens who were considered to have special talents, or were otherwise useful to Nazi Germany, were kidnapped and sent to Germany. This "brain drain" left Poland's economy in ruins.

Agricultural exports increased during this time. However, this was primarily due to food rationing in Poland, rather than increased production.

=== Bank Of Issue in Poland ===
The Bank of Issue in Poland was a bank created by the Germans in the General Government in 1940. As a result, Polish banks and credit institutions were closed and their assets nationalized by the General Government. This meant that many Polish nationals lost their entire savings.

The bank's main functions included issuing currency, supplying short-term loans, and taking deposits. The new currency printed by the bank was called złoty, and it was given no backing. Because of this, the currency suffered from increasing inflation during the time of occupation. For reference, the złoty's exchange rate with the American dollar doubled by the end of the war period.

The bank was also assigned the task of accumulating as much capital as it could, which would then be put back into the German economy. This capital was also used to finance the German army.

=== Seizure of Polish property ===
After the invasion of Poland in 1939, both the Soviet Union and Nazi Germany seized the property of the Poles and the Jews living in the occupied territory. The value of this lost property is estimated to have been around $8 billion in 1942 currency values.

One of the most commonly looted was Poland's cultural artifacts, including over half a million art pieces. Among these cultural artifacts were also many books and archives. This sparked the creation of many well-known German collecting agencies.

Polish state property was given directly to the General Government. An institution entitled the Trust Office (Treuhändstelle) was introduced by Nazi Germany in 1939. Its purpose was to assume state companies, all private property and companies important to defense, and then all estates and farmsteads that belonged to Jews and ‘enemies of the Reich’. This property was then handed to a trustee, who in return gave a significant percentage of their income back to the Trust Office in compensation. The most valuable possessions and companies were given directly to Germans. In some cases, former owners were allowed to remain working at their plants or living in their homes. However, in most cases former owners were simply kicked out.

Many Poles were deported to ghettos after the German invasion. Over 1000 ghettos were created by the Germans in occupied territories. The largest ghetto was in Warsaw, Poland and held almost half a million Jews. After their deportations, Germans would confiscate their property and sell it or send it back to Germany.

=== Restitution ===
The conflict over restitution of property to these victims of the Holocaust took place primarily in two periods, 1945, with the end of World War II, and in 1990.

In 1943, 18 signatory states of the London Inter-Allied Declaration declared null and void all German expropriation measures in occupied territories and that any transfer of property was to be reversed with the conclusion of the war, whether or not the property was transferred by legal transaction or by looting or theft.

Unfortunately, many former owners of the seized property were murdered or had fled to neighboring countries. This limited the restitution process. This heirless property became a point of contention within these communities. Many fought over the right to these heirless properties and many worried that the significance of these properties was surpassing the importance of restoring individual rights to those who had suffered. Another problem with restitution was that many countries had established that only citizens of the country where the property was restituted could make a claim. However, many of the people who had fled their home countries during the war had lost their citizenship, disqualifying them from claiming their own property.

In 1990 there was a revamping of the restitution process. This included the creation of The World Jewish Restitution Organization designed to represent the best interests of many different Jewish organizations. The European Union played a big role in putting pressure specifically on Eastern countries to return property still in their countries.

In 1998 there was a Conference of Holocaust-Era Assets in Washington, D.C. The commissions, which included 23 countries, researched what had happened to stolen property during the war. This same year Swiss banks agreed to $1.25 billion in compensation to future claimants. The German Chancellor, in an attempt to make amends to forced laborers, created the foundation, "Remembrance, Responsibility, and Future."

There continue to be efforts to return the individual rights to victims of the Holocaust today. An example is the Holocaust Expropriated Art Recovery Act of 2016. The purpose of the act is "to provide the victims of Holocaust-era persecution and their heirs a fair opportunity to recover works of art confiscated or misappropriated by the Nazis."

== See also ==
- Invasion of Poland
- Timeline of Polish history
