= Under the Clock =

Coordinates: 51.2468°N 22.5461°E

Under the Clock (Pod Zegarem in Polish) was a Nazi torture centre in Lublin, Poland during World War II.

== History ==
The Nazis used Lublin as the center of Operation Reinhard. The torture centre is in the centre of the city nearby a clock tower. Gestapo established cells in the basement and used them to interrogate Poles. It was used by the Nazis from 1939 - 1944.

== Museum ==
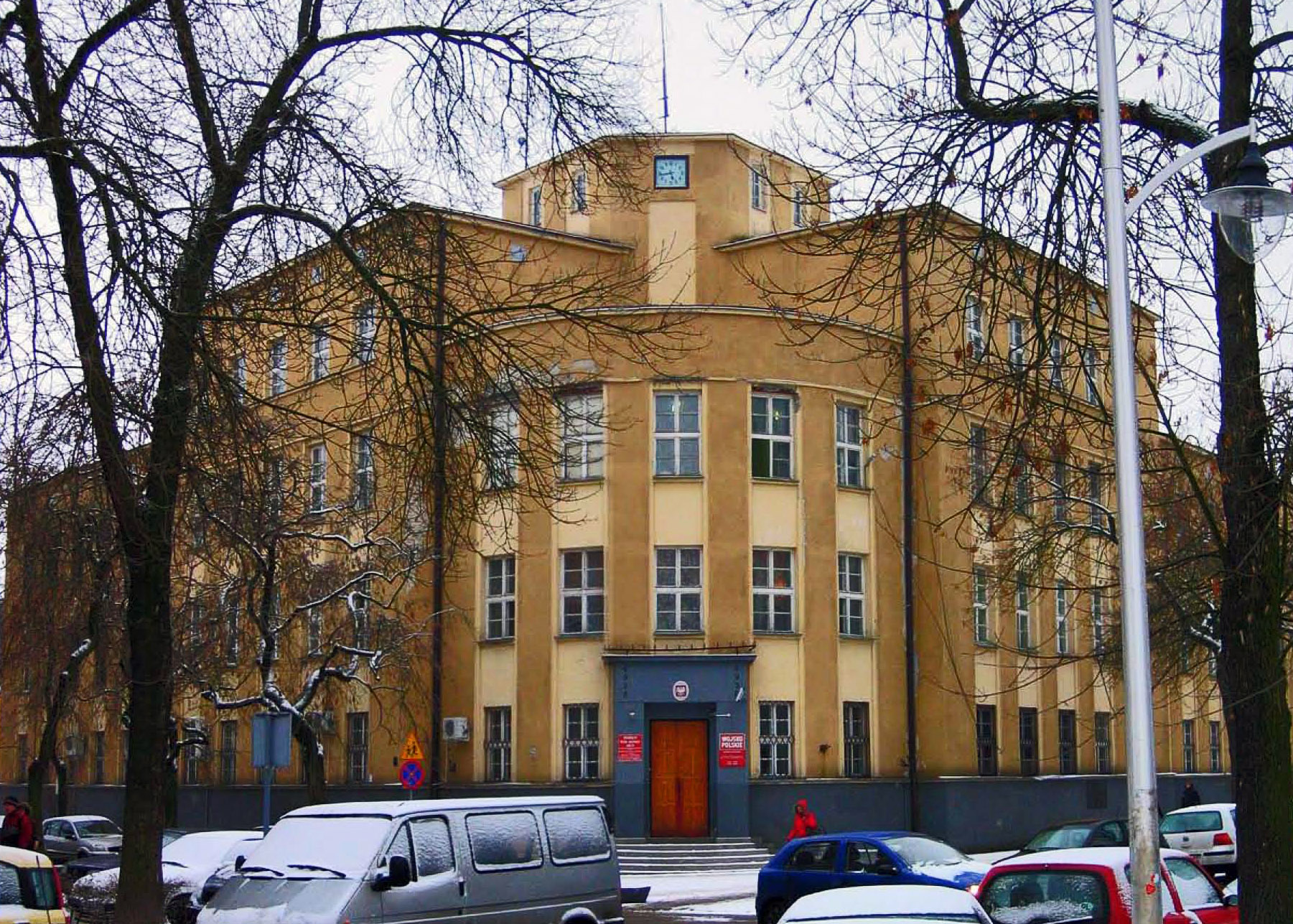
"Under the Clock" - the museum building

A museum, known as Muzeum Martyrologii Pod Zegarem (The Museum of the Martyrology of Under the Clock) was established there to remember Polish history and the people who died at Under the Clock.

== References in media ==
Under the Clock serves as a plot location in James A. Michener's novel Poland.
