= Kraków Park =

City park in Kraków, Poland

Coordinates: 50°04′05″N 19°55′27″E

Park Krakowski, 2018

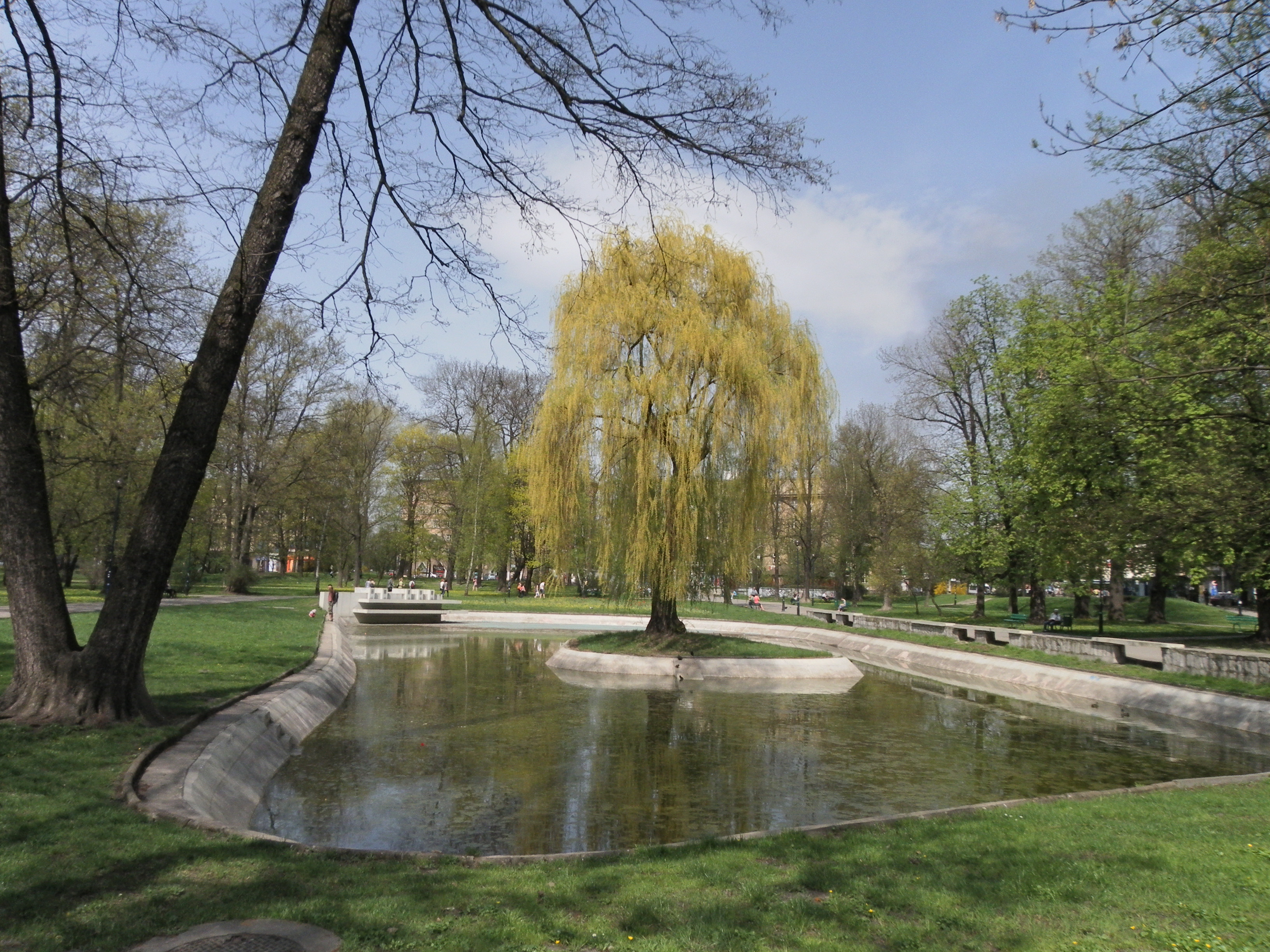
Pond with fountain in Park Krakowski.

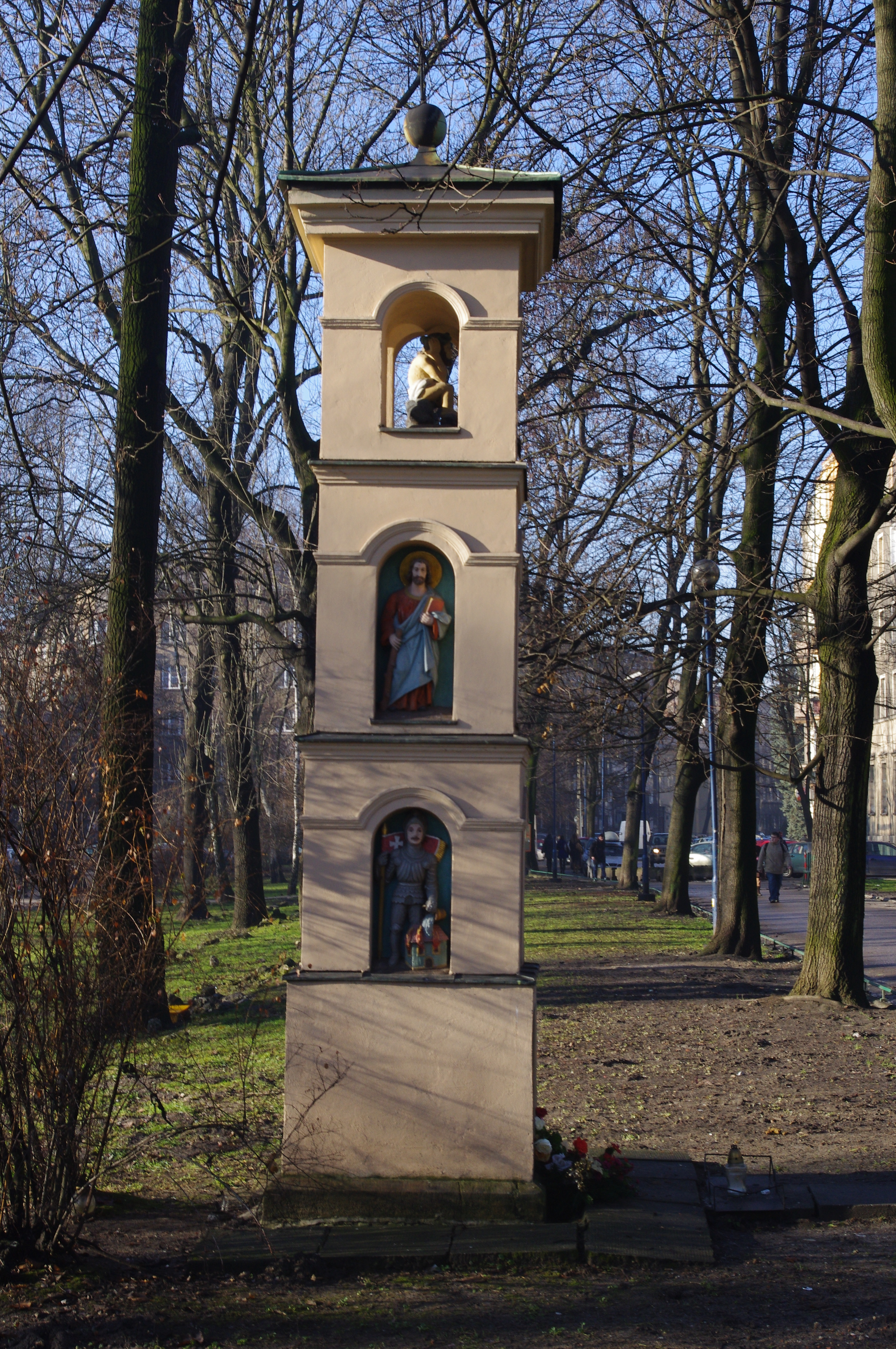
19th-century landscape tower in the park.

Park Krakowski is a 12.5 acres (5.1 ha) city park located in Kraków, in southern Poland. The park, founded in 1885, was modelled after similar parks in Vienna. It is a contemporary sculpture park.

== History ==
Park Krakowski was originated by city councillor Stanisław Rehman. It was built on grounds leased from the Polish military. It was a popular destination point with many Fin de siècle Cracovians. After World War I, its size was reduced, due to rapid real estate development.

=== Features ===
The park originally contained:

1. an outdoor concert bowl amphitheatre
2. a summer outdoor theater (built 1890)
3. a zoo
4. an ice skating rink and bicycle rink
5. a swimming pool and pond
6. a bowling alley
7. a restaurant and seasonal outdoor cafés.

From the original 1885 design, the only remaining built features are landscape tower elements, and the ornamental pond with its fountain.

=== Sculpture park ===
Park Krakowski has been a sculpture park since 1974. It has numerous abstract outdoor sculptures on display throughout the park grounds.

They were created by Polish modern art sculptors, including: S. Borzęcki; A. Hajducki; W. Kućma; J. Sękowski; and J. Siek.
