= Executions at Fort Krzesławice =

Mass executions of Polish citizens in World War II

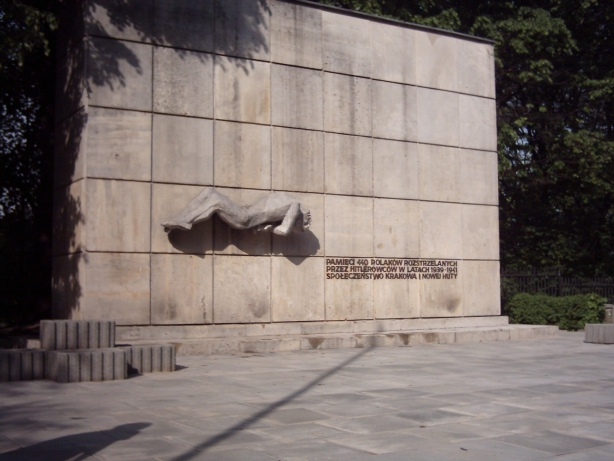
- Monument to the victims of executions at Fort Krzesławice
- Location: 50°5′54.99″N 20°3′21.28″E; Kraków; Poland
- Date: 1939–1941
- Attack type: execution by shooting
- Deaths: 440
- Perpetrators: SS, Ordnungspolizei

Executions at Fort Krzesławice were mass executions of Polish citizens carried out by German occupiers at Fort Krzesławice in Kraków.

In the early years of the German occupation, Fort Krzesławice served as the primary execution site for Polish political prisoners from the Kraków area. Between October 1939 and November 1941, SS officers and Ordnungspolizei conducted at least 12 mass executions there, claiming the lives of 440 individuals. Among the victims were many members of Kraków's intelligentsia, arrested as part of the so-called AB-Aktion.

== Beginning of German occupation ==
Kraków was seized by Wehrmacht units on 6 September 1939. A week later, a subunit of Einsatzgruppe I (Note: It was Einsatzkommando 2/I, led by SS-Sturmbannführer Bruno Müller. The commander of Einsatzgruppe I, on the other hand, was SS-Brigadeführer Bruno Streckenbach (Hein & Jakubiec (1985, p. 30)).) – a special operational group of Sicherheitsdienst and Sicherheitspolizei tasked with "eliminating all elements hostile to the Reich and Germany behind the lines of advancing troops" and "apprehending individuals deemed politically unreliable" – entered the city. The unit established itself in a complex of buildings with an entrance at 2 Pomorska Street (the former Academic House and several adjacent tenement houses), which would serve as the headquarters of the Kraków Gestapo for the next five years.

In occupied Kraków, German police and administrative authorities were quickly installed. By a decree from Hitler on 12 October 1939, the so-called General Government was established on Polish lands not directly annexed to the Third Reich, with its "capital" located in Kraków. The Wawel Castle became the residence of Governor-General Hans Frank. In early November 1939, the Einsatzgruppe I personnel formed the office of the Commander of the SD and Security Police in Kraków. Until December 1939, it was led by SS-Sturmbannführer Bruno Müller. Subsequently, this position was held by SS-Sturmbannführer Walter Huppenkothen (until January 1940), SS-Sturmbannführer Dr. Ludwig Hahn (until August 1940), and SS-Obersturmbannführer Dr. Max Grosskopf (until the end of 1943).

From the earliest days of the occupation, the Germans exercised brutal terror against the residents of Kraków. It primarily targeted the Polish social elite, the Jewish population, and individuals connected in any way to the resistance movement. One of the most notorious acts of terror against Polish intelligentsia in the first months of the occupation occurred in Kraków – the arrest of university professors on 6 November 1939.

Kraków's prisons and detention centers – including the Montelupich Prison, the "St. Michael" penitentiary on Senacka Street, and the basements of the Gestapo headquarters on Pomorska Street – quickly filled with detainees. Some of those arrested were deported to German concentration camps, while many others were subjected to direct extermination. The Germans conducted secret executions in locations such as Przegorzały and the Niepołomice Forest. However, in the early years of the occupation, the main site for the execution of political prisoners from Kraków became the former Austrian Fort Krzesławice.

== Executions as part of the AB-Aktion ==
From the very first days of the occupation, German terror was primarily directed at representatives of Poland's political and intellectual elites. According to the racist stereotype of Poles prevalent in the Third Reich, Nazi leaders believed that only the Polish intelligentsia possessed national consciousness, while the general populace focused mainly on daily survival and was indifferent to the fate of the state. For this reason, it was assumed that exterminating the Polish elites would destroy Poland's national identity and transform Polish society into a passive, amorphous mass, serving at best as unskilled labor for the Third Reich.

As part of the so-called Intelligenzaktion, carried out in the occupied Polish territories between September 1939 and spring 1940, the Germans murdered at least 100,000 Polish citizens, with the highest numbers on the territories incorporated into the Reich. By the spring of 1940, however, the Germans realized that despite intensive extermination efforts in all districts of the General Government, Polish society had recovered from the shock of the September defeat, and the resistance movement was intensifying its activities.

On 16 May 1940, a conference took place in Kraków to discuss "extraordinary measures necessary to ensure peace and order in the General Government". Attendees included Governor-General Hans Frank, SS-Obergruppenführer Friedrich-Wilhelm Krüger (Higher SS and Police Leader in the General Government), SS-Brigadeführer Bruno Streckenbach (commander of the SD and security police in the General Government), Dr. Arthur Seyss-Inquart (head of the General Government), and Josef Bühler (state secretary in the General Government). Frank informed the participants that the General Government faced the threat of a Polish uprising, claiming that "thousands of Poles have organized in secret associations, are armed, and are prepared to commit acts of terror of all kinds in the most rebellious manner".

Later that day, Frank issued an order for SS-Brigadeführer Streckenbach to carry out an "extraordinary pacification action with immediate effect". At another conference on 30 May 1940, Frank declared that the aim of the AB-Aktion would be the "accelerated liquidation of the majority of rebellious politicians, resistance advocates, and other politically suspicious individuals in our custody, as well as putting an end to traditional Polish criminality". It was decided that detainees would not be sent to concentration camps but "eliminated on the spot in the simplest manner". Streckenbach estimated that at least 3,500 individuals considered the "flower of the Polish intelligentsia and resistance movement" would be murdered, along with several thousand criminal offenders.

In Kraków, mass arrests began on 30 March 1940. The Sicherheitspolizei detained nearly 1,000 individuals. On 3 May, hundreds of Kraków residents leaving churches after Sunday services were arrested. Numerous individual arrests also occurred. Most of the detainees were held at Montelupich Prison. During this period, the prison housed an ad hoc police court chaired by SS-Sturmbannführer Ludwig Hahn.

Mirosław Ociepka, a Montelupich prisoner, described one of the court's sessions. He recalled that the Standgericht convened in a ground-floor prison room where, behind a table covered with green cloth, sat Hahn, SS-Hauptsturmführer Fischer, SS-Hauptsturmführer Müller, and two clerks. The accused were brought in one by one, asked for their name, surname, and date of birth, and then sentenced to death without being given a chance to speak. Only the reason for the sentence, usually "treason against the state" (Landesverrat), was announced. In May 1940 alone, 290 people were sentenced to death in this manner.

The main execution site for those arrested during the AB-Aktion was Fort Krzesławice. (Note: Executions of individuals arrested during the AB-Aktion also took place in the Glinnik Forest near Przegorzały and in Nowy Wiśnicz. Additionally, many residents of Kraków and its surroundings were deported at that time to concentration camps, primarily Auschwitz and Sachsenhausen (Mańkowski (1992, pp. 43–45)).) In three mass executions (on 29 June, 2 July, and 4 July 1940), the Germans executed approximately 150 individuals, including teachers, lawyers, and military officers. Among them were also 36 hostages from Myślenice, executed on 29 June. (Note: They were arrested in retaliation for a mysterious explosion at the Myślenice post office, which occurred during the night of 22 to 23 June 1940 (Wroński (1981, p. 18)).) Additionally, numerous individual executions occurred at the fort, such as that of Józef Harmala. Three prisoners – Stanisław Marusarz (a ski jumper and world championship silver medalist from Lahti), Aleksander Bugajski, and a man named Sadowski – managed to escape from Montelupich's death cell before being transported to Krzesławice for execution.

== Course of the extermination operation ==
Fort Krzesławice is part of a ring of Austrian fortifications that once surrounded Kraków. It is located approximately 13 kilometers northeast of Kraków's center on an elevation reaching 275 meters above sea level. From the perpetrators' perspective, the fort was an ideal location for executions. It was relatively well-camouflaged and not visible from a significant distance. The areas immediately surrounding the fortifications were undeveloped, with the nearest settlements (Krzesławice, Dłubnia, Kantorowice, Grębałów, Lubocza) located 800 to 1,200 meters away. Moreover, the fort was just 1 kilometer from the Kraków-Kocmyrzów road, facilitating prisoner transport to the execution site.

Shortly after occupying Kraków, the Germans appeared at the fort to remove the ammunition stored there. According to testimony from the fort's caretaker, Antoni Grzesiak, the first execution took place there on 11 October 1939. Another mass execution occurred on 15 November 1939, during which the Germans reportedly shot 15 people, including three women. It is generally accepted that the extermination operation at Fort Krzesławice lasted from autumn 1939 to November 1941, peaking in intensity during the summer of 1940. Documented execution dates include: 11 October 1939, 15 November 1939, 14 December 1939, 14 January 1940, around 20 January 1940, 29 March 1940, 6 June 1940, 29 June 1940, 2 July 1940, 4 July 1940, 12 March 1941, and 7 November 1941.

Mass murders at Fort Krzesławice generally followed the same procedure. Extensive information has been preserved, particularly about the extermination of prisoners from Montelupich Prison. Condemned prisoners were kept in separate rooms beforehand, typically in one of the ground-floor cells on the left wing or in cells 87 and 94 on the first floor. The day before executions, usually in the afternoon, the prisoners were transported to the fort to dig their own mass graves. Execution transports were organized at night or in the early morning hours. Prisoners from Montelupich were called out into the hallway without their belongings, sometimes dressed only in undergarments. Their hands were tied behind their backs with rope or wire, or they were shackled in pairs. In some cases, the condemned were gagged or marked with a cross drawn in white chalk on the back of their jackets. A typical transport consisted of 2 or 3 canvas-covered trucks carrying prisoners, accompanied by 1 or 2 vehicles for the escort and the execution squad.

During executions carried out within the fort, typically between 30 and 50 prisoners were killed at a time, though there were instances of individual murders as well. Prisoners were shot on-site at the edge of pre-dug graves. Post-war exhumation results indicate that most victims (395 out of 440) were killed by a gunshot to the back of the head. There were likely cases where individuals showing signs of life were buried alive. At times, Polish residents from nearby Krzesławice were forced to fill the graves. The execution squads usually consisted of officers from the German Schutzpolizei. The executions were typically overseen by SS-Unterscharführer Skrzypek.

Occasionally, to maintain an illusion of legality, prisoners were brought before a so-called summary police court (Standgericht). The court typically consisted of Kraków's commander of the Sicherheitsdienst and security police or an authorized officer (as chairman) and two other officers authorized by the commander (as members). The first session of the Kraków Standgericht took place at Montelupich Prison between 20 and 24 December 1939 and involved several prisoners brought from Wadowice. The court's peak activity occurred in spring and summer 1940. Proceedings were a travesty of justice, conducted in an extremely simplified manner. However, in most cases, the Germans dispensed with any semblance of legality and issued death sentences without a trial.

The Germans made efforts to conceal the crimes committed at Fort Krzesławice. Families of the murdered were falsely informed that their relatives had been deported for labor in the Reich or were told of their death, citing fabricated causes such as a heart attack. However, Kraków's residents quickly uncovered the truth about the executions. Messages thrown from transports by prisoners on their way to execution revealed their fate to their families. In the fort's vicinity, locals discovered various items belonging to the victims and, in some cases, traces of blood and body fragments.

== Victims ==
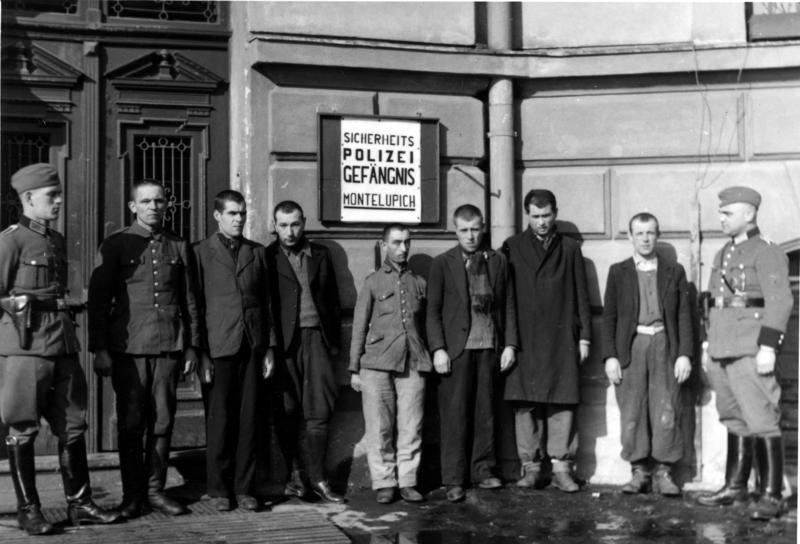
Prisoners of Montelupich (1939)

An exhumation conducted at the execution site in 1945 uncovered the remains of 440 victims of German terror, including 18 women. The ages of the murdered ranged from 15 to 70 years. Some publications claim that as many as 2,000 people were killed at Fort Krzesławice, but this figure is significantly exaggerated.

Condemned individuals were brought to the execution site from two Kraków prisons: Montelupich and the "St. Michael" prison on Senacka Street. For 125 victims, the reason for their arrest and death has been determined. Among those executed at Fort Krzesławice were Polish underground soldiers, representatives of the so-called "Polish leadership class", escapees caught at the Slovak border, and random victims of the collective responsibility policy imposed by the occupiers.

In addition to residents of Kraków and surrounding areas, individuals from other regions of Poland, including Częstochowa, Kalisz, Krynica, Lublin, Myślenice, Poznań, Przemyśl, Toruń, Warsaw, and Zakopane, were also executed there. Notable victims executed at Fort Krzesławice include:

- Officers: Major Walery Krokay and his son Jerzy; Lieutenant Colonel Piotr Sosialuk, former commander of the 73rd Infantry Regiment in Katowice.
- Teachers: Kazimierz Dutkiewicz (teacher from Myślenice), Irena Dzius (Latin teacher at the private Women's Gymnasium of the Benedictine Sisters in Przemyśl) and her sister Halina, Jan Gębicki (school inspector from Myślenice), Marian Gębicki (school principal in Myślenice), Wincenty Frączek (high school teacher from Myślenice), Marian Lubaczowski (physical education teacher at the 5th Gymnasium in Kraków), Karol Święch (teacher from Upper Silesia), and Józef Wawrzeczko (mathematics teacher at the 5th Gymnasium in Kraków).
- Officials and social activists: Józef Janta (secretary of the Central District of the Miners' Union in Katowice), Henryk Schabenbeck (mayor of Zakopane), and Franciszek Ujczak (official from Myślenice).
- Lawyers: Dr. Emil Bicz (lawyer from Myślenice), Antoni Burtan (lawyer from Myślenice), and Bolesław Karwaciński (court trainee from Kraków).
- Artists: Jan Migdalski.

At Fort Krzesławice, the Germans also executed Jewish individuals. Some of the victims' names have been identified: Englender, Fiszman, Rottgerber, M. Zucker, and M. Gros (a merchant from Chrzanów). Additionally, Polish criminal prisoners were murdered at the fort, with the first execution occurring on 29 March 1940 and the last on 12 March 1941.

== After the war ==
Between 15 October and 6 December 1945, employees of the Chief Commission for the Prosecution of Crimes against the Polish Nation conducted a detailed examination of the execution site and exhumed the discovered graves. The investigation and exhumation were led by district investigative judge Jan Sehn, assisted by Dr. Stanisław Żmuda (judge of the Grodzki Court in Kraków), Edward Pęchalski, Dr. Wincenty Jarosiński (vice-prosecutors of the District Court), and Professor Jan Olbrycht (Head of the Forensic Medicine Department at Jagiellonian University). At Fort Krzesławice, 29 mass graves of various sizes were discovered – 23 in the fort's moats and six more in its courtyard. A total of 440 bodies were exhumed. 91 bodies were identified by the victims' relatives. (Note: Among them were 52 representatives of the intelligentsia and 32 farmers, workers, or craftsmen (Wroński (1981, p. 26)).) Documents and personal items found with 13 bodies facilitated their identification. Additionally, the names of 78 individuals believed to have been executed at Fort Krzesławice were determined. However, 258 victims remained unidentified. After the exhumation work was completed, all the bodies were interred in a single mass grave located behind the fort.

Shortly after the exhumation, a Citizens' Committee was formed to collect funds for the construction of a tomb and a monument to honor the victims. However, after the death of the committee's chairman (then the Kraków starosta), the committee's work stalled. It was not until mid-May 1956, thanks to the initiative of the Nowa Huta branch of the Society of Fighters for Freedom and Democracy and the district committee of the Front of National Unity, that a new Citizens' Committee for the Construction of the Monument was formed under the leadership of Tadeusz Rafałowicz, president of the Nowa Huta branch of the Society of Fighters for Freedom and Democracy. The surroundings of the grave were cleaned up, and on 27 May 1956, General Franciszek Księżarczyk, representing Society of Fighters for Freedom and Democracy's Main Council, unveiled a commemorative plaque at the execution site. Subsequently, on 6 July 1956, a monument-mausoleum designed by sculptor Maria Rajnochowa was unveiled at Fort Krzesławice. Approximately 20,000 people attended the ceremony, including Prime Minister Józef Cyrankiewicz and delegations from East Germany and Czechoslovakia. Additionally, the Citizens' Committee for the Construction of the Monument funded 10 scholarships (totaling 150,000 PLN) for orphans of the victims murdered at Fort Krzesławice.

In the following years, however, the memorial site gradually fell into disrepair. In the 1970s, the authorities of the Nowa Huta district decided to fill in the moats and caponiers, which still bore bullet marks and plaques inscribed with "A place sanctified by the martyr's blood of Poles". The western caponier was also demolished. The fort's grounds began to be used for warehouses, garages, chicken coops, and even illegal garbage dumps. The fort's degradation was halted when it was repurposed as the headquarters of the Youth Cultural Center in 1994. In 1995, a plaque was placed near the entrance gate, close to the mass grave, with the inscription: "Cemetery – resting place of 440 Poles murdered by the Nazis in 1939–41".

== Responsibility of the perpetrators ==
In 1947, the British Military Tribunal in Hamburg sentenced Bruno Müller to 20 years of imprisonment for crimes committed during the final stages of the war. Müller was released early in 1953 and died in March 1960. Walter Huppenkothen settled in West Germany after the war, where he was sentenced to seven years of imprisonment for his involvement in the persecution of members of the German anti-Nazi resistance movement. After being released in 1959, he became a respected specialist in economic law. He died in 1979 in Lübeck. Ludwig Hahn lived for many years in Hamburg under his real name. He was not brought to trial until 1972, and after a year-long trial, he was sentenced to 12 years of imprisonment. In a revision trial, the Hamburg jury increased the sentence to life imprisonment (1975), but this verdict concerned only the crimes Hahn committed during the liquidation of the Warsaw Ghetto. Hahn was released in 1983 and died three years later.

SS-Gruppenführer Karl Zech, SS and Police Leader in the Kraków District, committed suicide in 1944. Max Grosskopf also committed suicide in 1945. Otto Wächter, Governor of the Kraków District, died in 1949 in Rome, where he had been hiding in a Catholic college.

== In culture ==
Scenes depicting the mass executions at Fort Krzesławice appear in the 2024 Polish war drama Biała odwaga (directed by Marcin Koszałka).

== Bibliography ==
- Böhler, Jochen; Mallmann, Klaus-Michael; Matthäus, Jürgen (2009). Einsatzgruppen w Polsce [Einsatzgruppen in Poland] (in Polish). Warsaw: Bellona. ISBN 978-83-11-11588-0.
- Chwalba, Andrzej (2011). Okupacyjny Kraków w latach 1939–1945 [Occupied Kraków in the Years 1939–1945] (in Polish). Kraków: Wydawnictwo Literackie. ISBN 978-83-08-04626-5.
- Hein, Wincenty; Jakubiec, Czesława (1985). Montelupich (in Polish). Kraków: Wydawnictwo Literackie. ISBN 83-08-00393-1.
- Mańkowski, Zygmunt, ed. (1992). Ausserordentliche Befriedungsaktion 1940 – akcja AB na ziemiach polskich: materiały z sesji naukowej (6-7 listopada 1986 r.) [Extraordinary Pacification Action 1940 – AB Aktion in Polish Territories: Materials from the Scientific Session (6–7 November 1986)] (in Polish). Warsaw: Zakład Historii Najnowszej Uniwersytetu Marii Skłodowskiej-Curie.
- Wardzyńska, Maria (2009). Był rok 1939. Operacja niemieckiej policji bezpieczeństwa w Polsce. Intelligenzaktion [It Was the Year 1939. The German Security Police Operation in Poland. Intelligenzaktion] (in Polish). Warsaw: Instytut Pamięci Narodowej. ISBN 978-83-7629-063-8.
- Wroński, Tadeusz (1981). Fort Krzesławicki – miejsce masowych egzekucji Polaków w Krakowie w latach 1939–1941 [Fort Krzesławice – A Site of Mass Executions of Poles in Kraków in the Years 1939–1941] (in Polish). Warsaw: Sport i Turystyka. ISBN 83-217-2312-8.
- Zbrodnie hitlerowskie w Krzesławicach w latach 1939–1941 [Nazi Crimes in Krzesławice in the Years 1939–1941] (in Polish). Kraków: Komitet Obywatelski Budowy Pomnika na Miejscu Straceń w Krzesławicach. 1956.
