= Wanda Green Ravine Park =

Urban park in Krakow, Poland

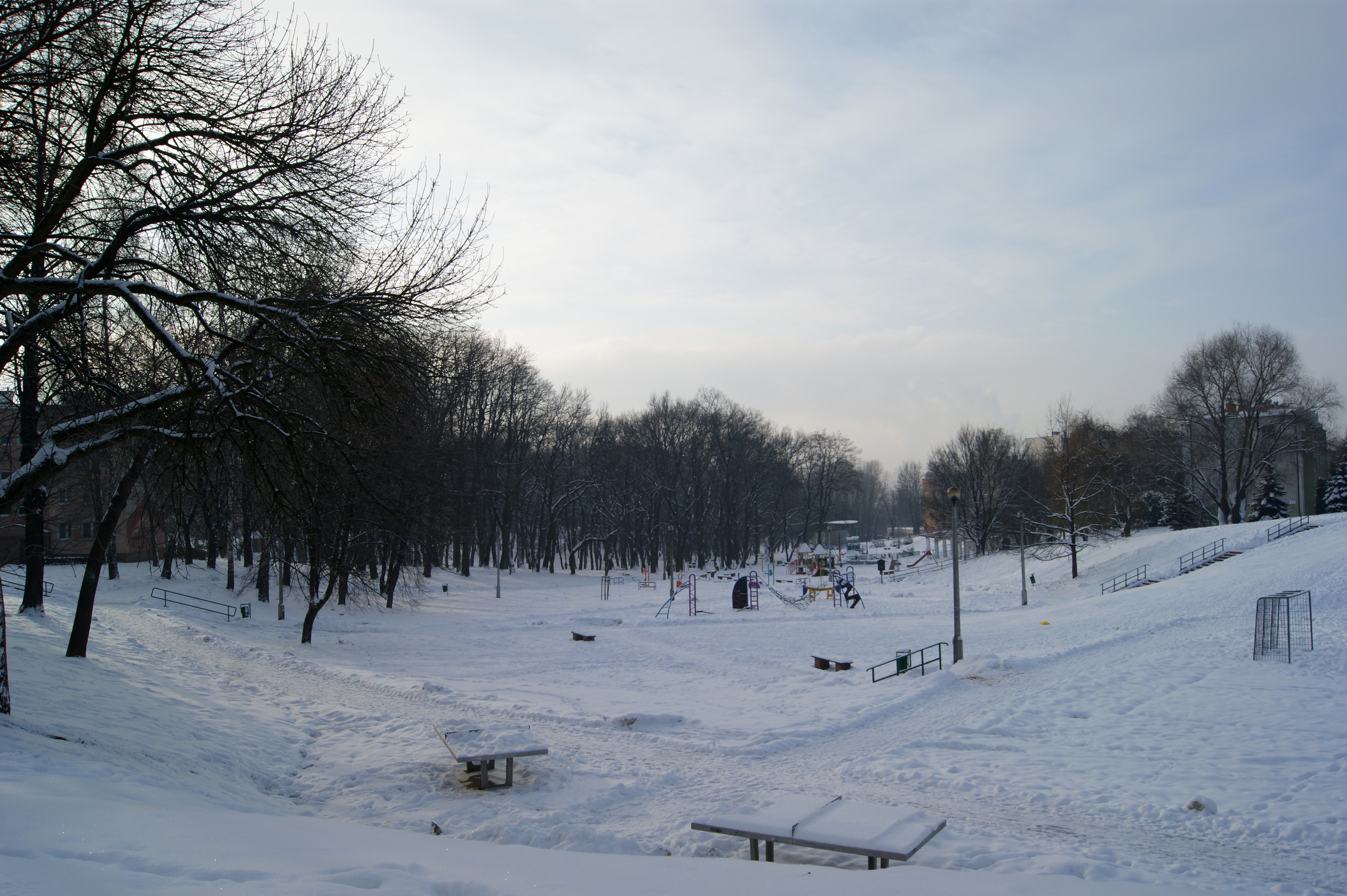
- The park in 2010.
- Interactive map of Wanda Green Ravine Park
- Type: Urban park
- Location: Kraków, Poland
- Coordinates: 50°05′42″N 20°03′34″E
- Area: 5.5 hectares (14 acres)

The Wanda Green Ravine Park (Polish: Park Zielony Jar Wandy) is an urban park in Kraków, Poland, located in the district of Wzgórza Krzesławickie.

== Characteristics ==
The park is located in the district of Wzgórza Krzesławickie, in a ravine between neighbourhoods of Na Stoku to the west, and Na Wzgórzach to the east. It has the total area of 5.5 ha. It was developed in place of an undeveloped ravine. The park includes the Krzesławice Woods, a small forested area.

The park amenities include a multifunctional sports court, children's play area, and a theatre shell.
