= Fort 52a Łapianka =

Fort pancerny pomocniczy 52a "Łapianka"
- Part of Kraków Fortress
- Kraków, Poland
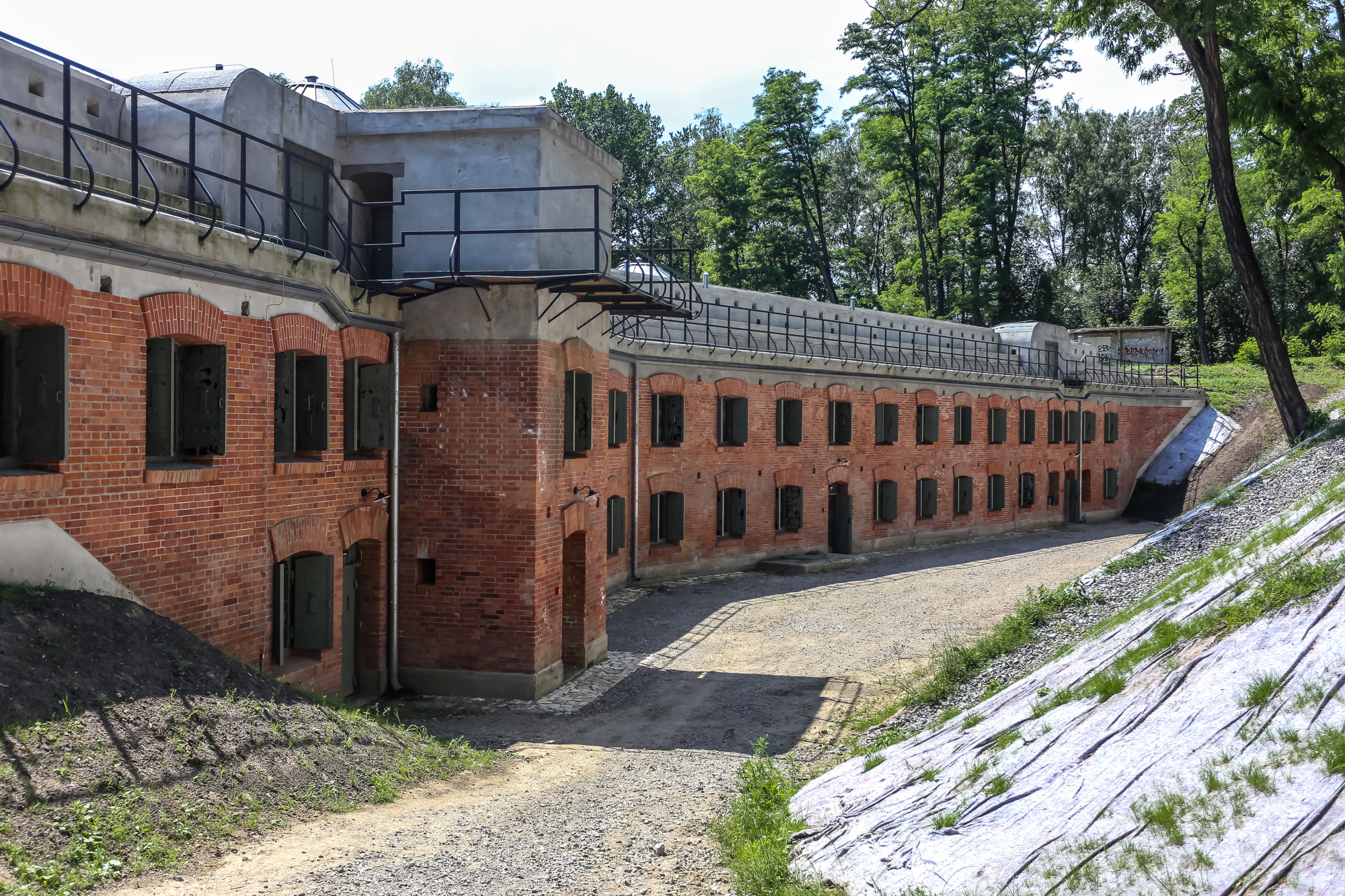

Site information
- Open to the public: Yes

Location
- Coordinates: 49.9979054°N 19.9170113°E

Site history
- Built: 1896–1902

Kraków Fortress 52a, also called "Łapianka" (Jugowice), was a part of the Kraków Fortress between 1896 and 1902 (according to other sources 1897–1898). The fortress was built to enforce defense of the south flank of the fortress, ruling over the part of the road connecting Vienna and Lviv.

The fortress has four towers equipped with 8 cm M94 artillery guns.

It's one of the 14 similar forts, built during the same time in Kraków, which used to enforce outer defense ring of the city. Near the fort there was an artillery battery used for the long range defense, no longer in use.

== See also ==
- Kraków Fortress
