= Adolf Szyszko-Bohusz =

Polish architect and conservationist (1883–1948)

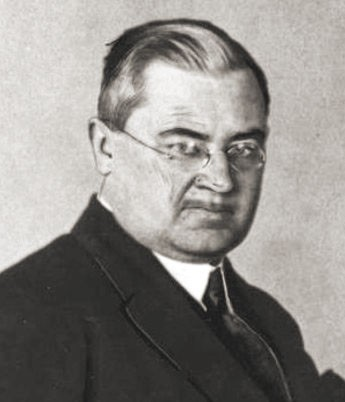
- Szyszko-Bohusz in c. 1927
- Born: 1 September 1883; Narva, Russian Empire
- Died: 1 October 1948 (aged 65); Kraków, Poland
- Education: Saint Petersburg Academy of Arts
- Occupations: architect, preservationist
- Spouse: Stefania (née Rzepko-Łaska)
- Children: 1 daughter (Sława)
- Parent(s): Polikarp Szyszko-Bohusz (father); Marcelina (née Rząśnicka) (mother)
- Buildings: Presidential Castle in Wisła; Feniks House in Kraków; PKO BP Building in Kraków

Adolf Szyszko-Bohusz (1 September 1883 – 1 October 1948) was a Polish architect and conservator of monuments. He was a leading representative of historicism and modernism in Poland.

== Life and career ==
He was born on 1 September 1883 in Narva, Russian Empire (present-day Estonia) to parents Polikarp Szyszko-Bohusz and mother Marcelina (née Rząśnicka).

Between 1902 and 1909, he studied in Saint Petersburg, later also in Austria in Germany. In 1910 Szyszko-Bohusz began lecturing at the Jagiellonian University and at the Jan Matejko Academy of Fine Arts in Kraków. In 1912 he moved to Lwów, to lecture at the Lviv Polytechnic, where he remained until 1916.

Upon returning to Kraków, in 1916, Szyszko-Bohusz was given the post of the director of renovation crew of the Wawel Castle. Due to his efforts, several buildings as well as rooms of the castle were remodelled and renewed. He discovered remnants of the Romanesque prince's palladium in front of the northern elevation of the castle (1921). In the years 1935–1938, he conducted restoration works in the western part of the cathedral. It was at that time that in St. Leonard's Crypt bishop Maurus's tomb was found (d. 1118), as well as several fragments of the walls of the Romanesque cathedral and traces of its sequence of transformations. He created the sarcophagus of Juliusz Słowacki and helped with creation of the crypt of Jozef Pilsudski.

In 1920, Szyszko-Bohusz became director of Department of Antique Architecture at the Academy of Fine Arts, and two years later he became rector of the college. Between 1932 and 1939, he was a director of the Architecture Department at the Warsaw University of Technology.

Szyszko-Bohusz was also a renowned architect. He designed his own family villa in Przegorzały, the monumental office of the Kraków's branch of PKO Bank Polski (1924) and several other buildings in Kraków. He designed the Castle of the President of Poland in the town of Wisla and the House of Health in Zakopane. Also, Szyszko-Bohusz was editor of the Architekt monthly.

From May 1937 to August 1939, he served as President of the Executive Board of the Association of Polish Architects (SARP). During this period, an Aryan paragraph was introduced into SARP, under which architects of Jewish origin were expelled from the organisation.

During World War II, Szyszko-Bohusz, with permission of the Home Army, worked in a private German architectural office, and in 1945 he returned to his post at the Wawel Castle. In the same year, he co-created Architecture Department at the AGH University of Science and Technology.

He died on 1 October 1948 and was buried at the Rakowicki Cemetery in Kraków.

== Honours ==
- Commander's Cross with Star of the Order of Polonia Restituta (1938)
- Commander's Cross of the Order of Polonia Restituta (1928)
- Officer's Cross of the Order of Polonia Restituta (1921)

== Projects (selected) ==
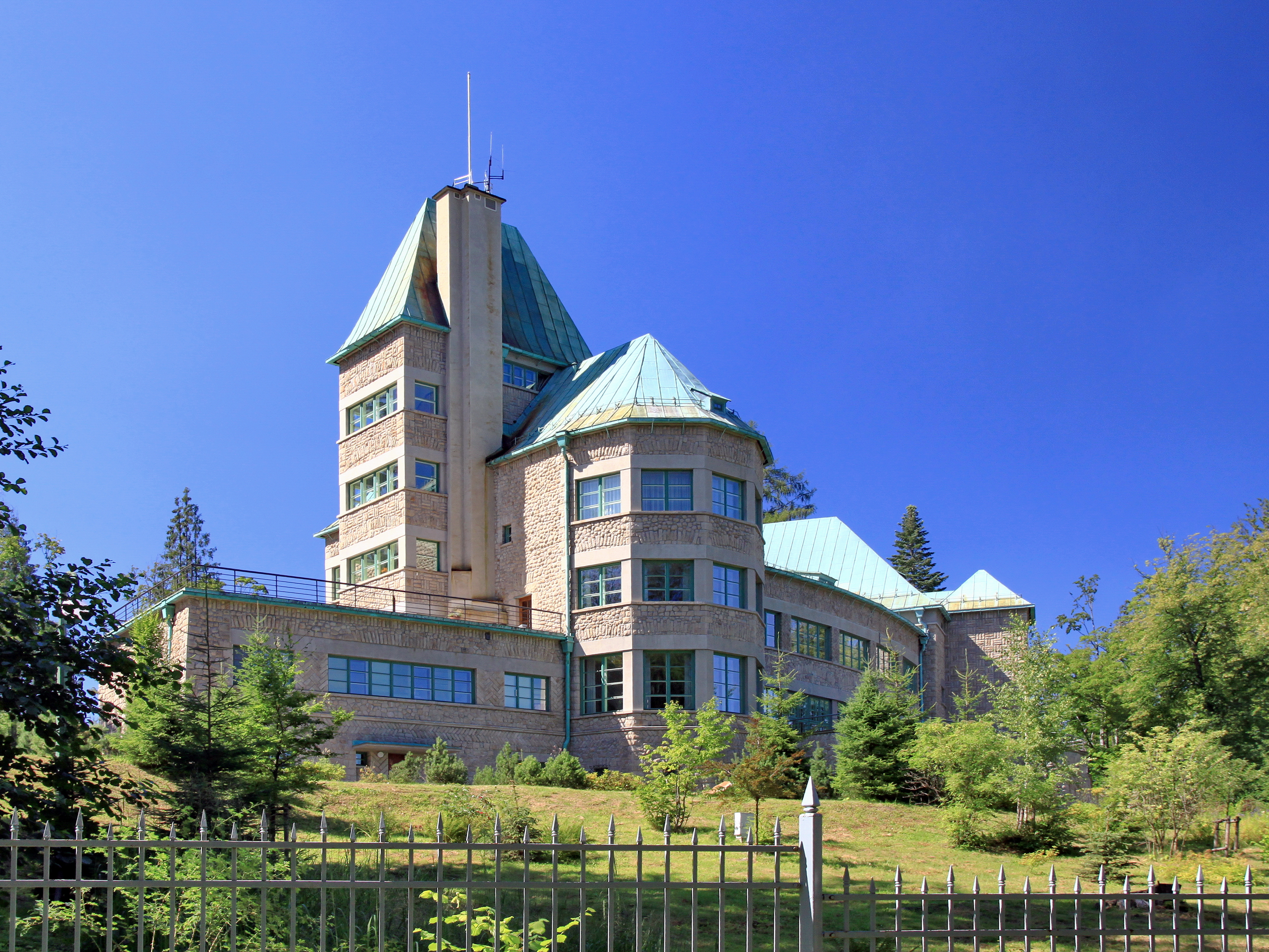
Presidential Castle
Wisła, Poland

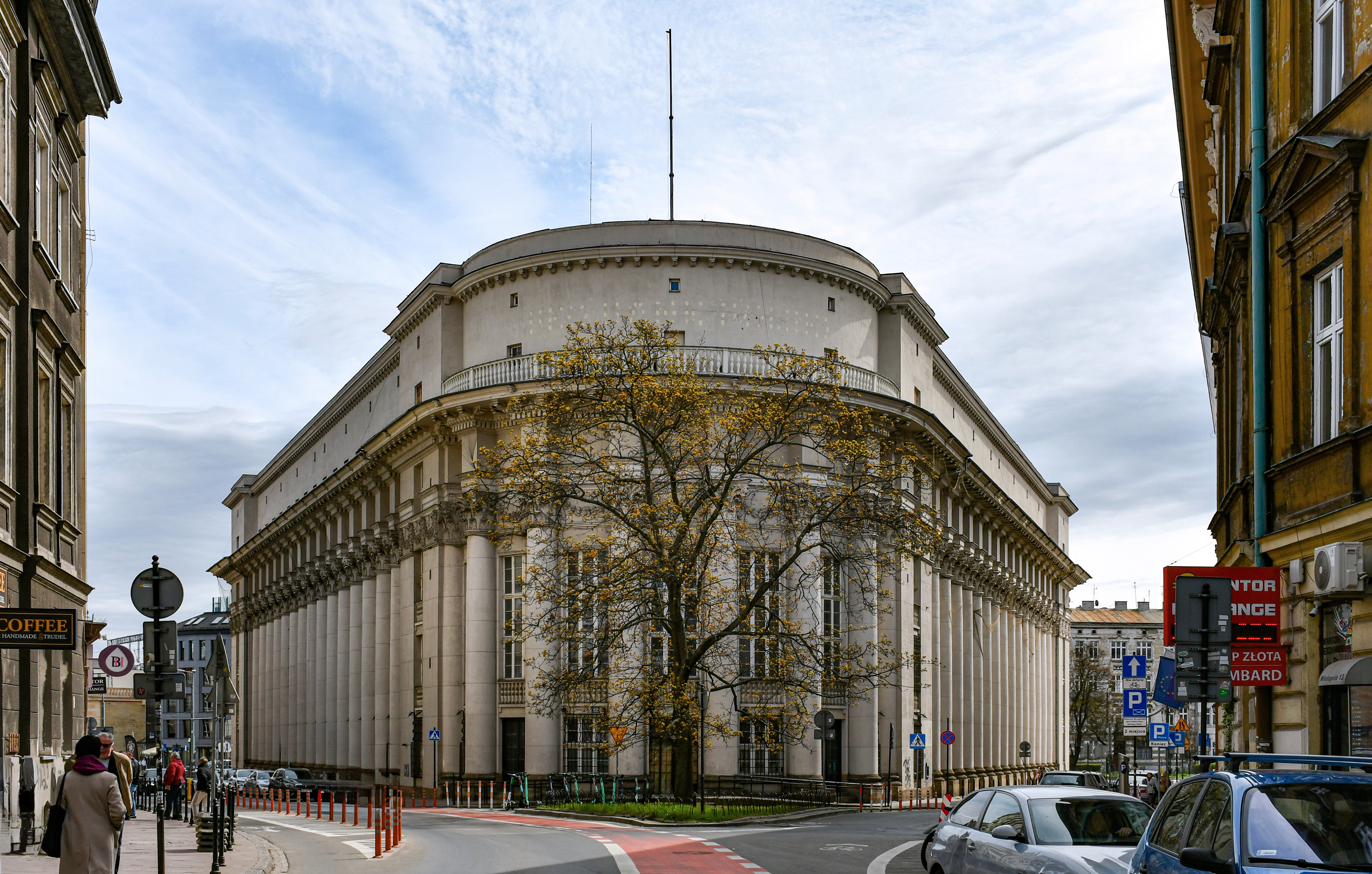
Former PKO Bank Building
19 Wielopole Street, Kraków, Poland

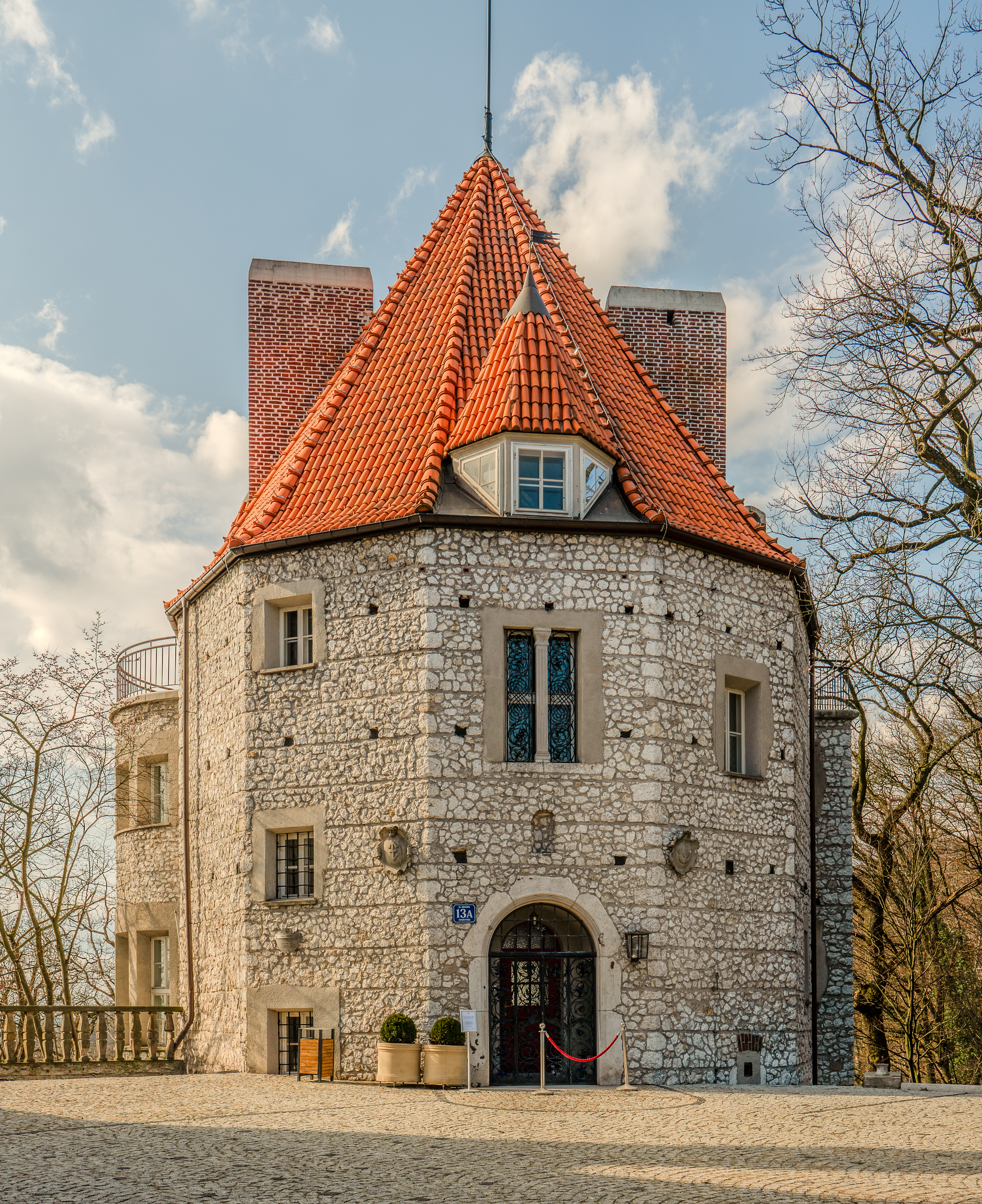
Baszta Villa (own house)
13a Jodłowa Street, Kraków

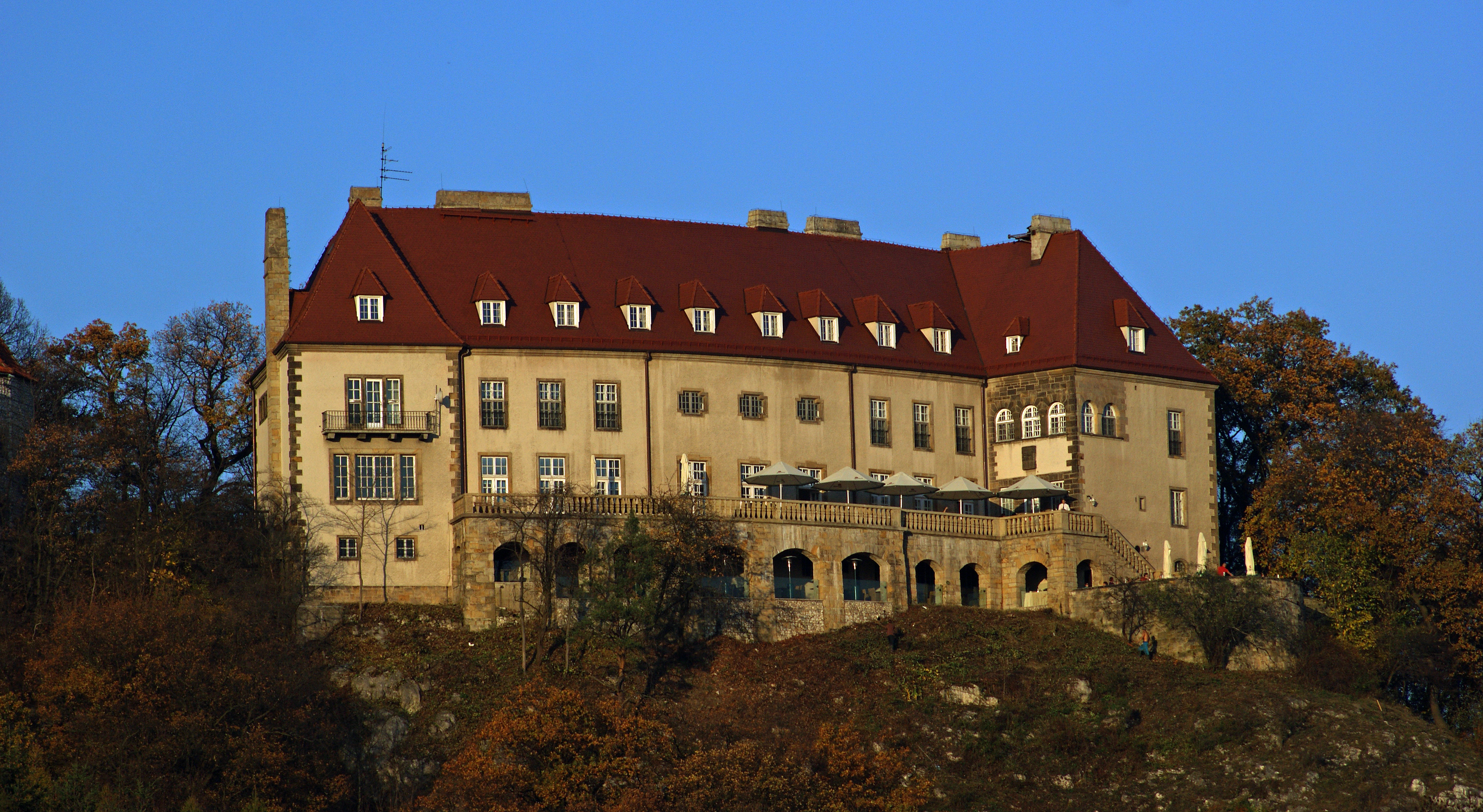
Przegorzały Castle (Schloss Wartenberg)
13 Jodłowa Street, Kraków

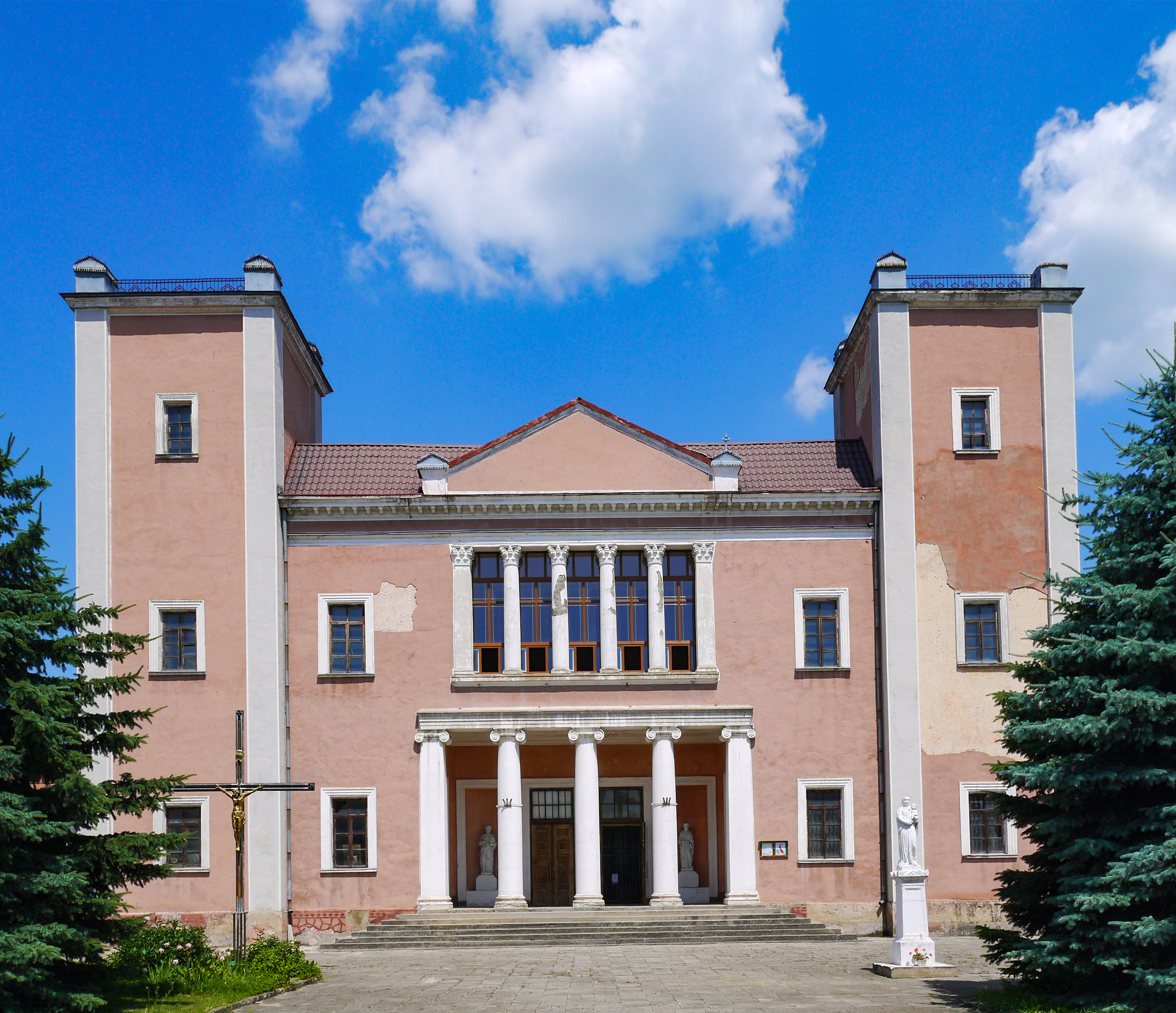
Church of Saints Peter and Paul
Terebovlia, Ukraine

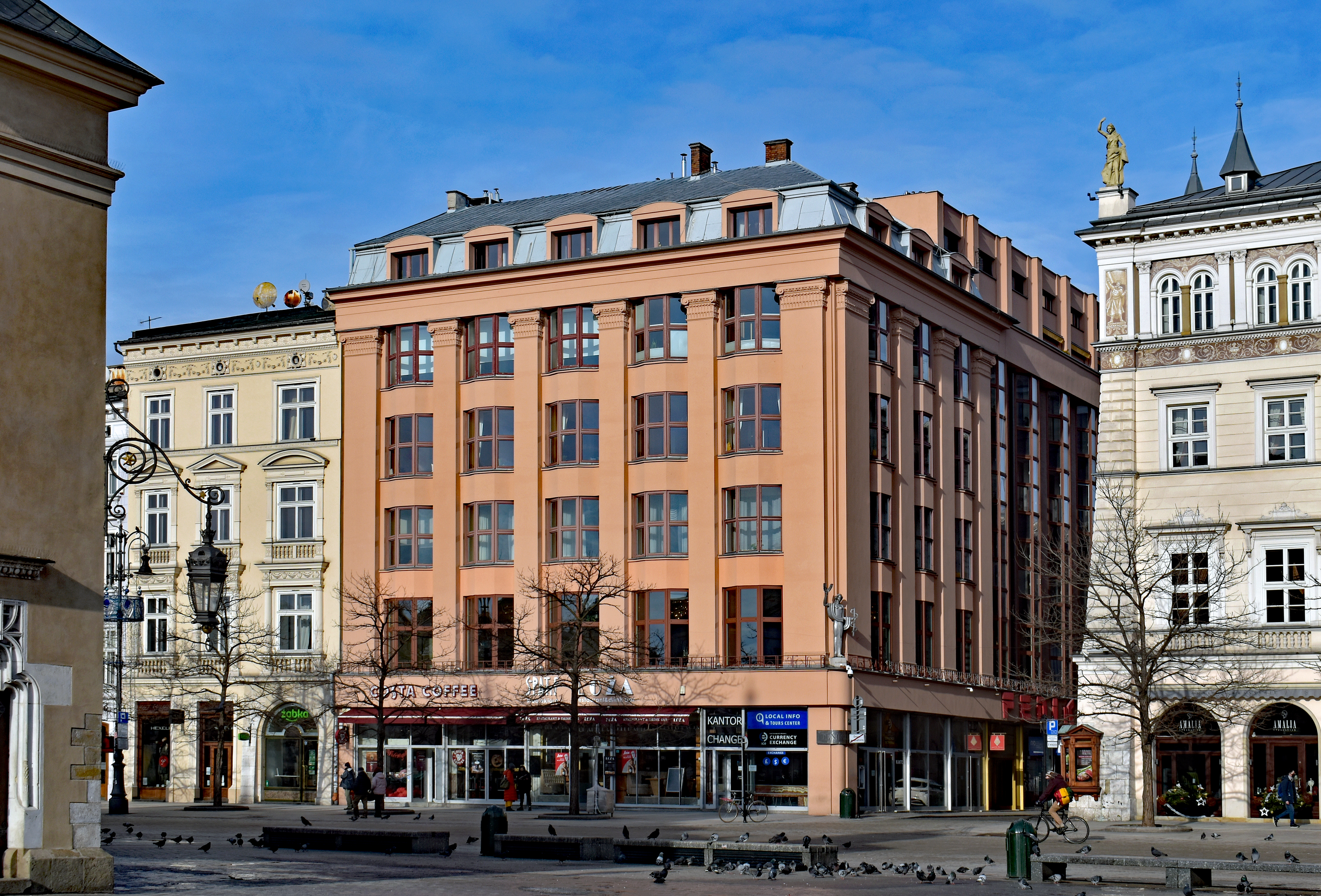
Feniks House
41 Main Market Square, Kraków

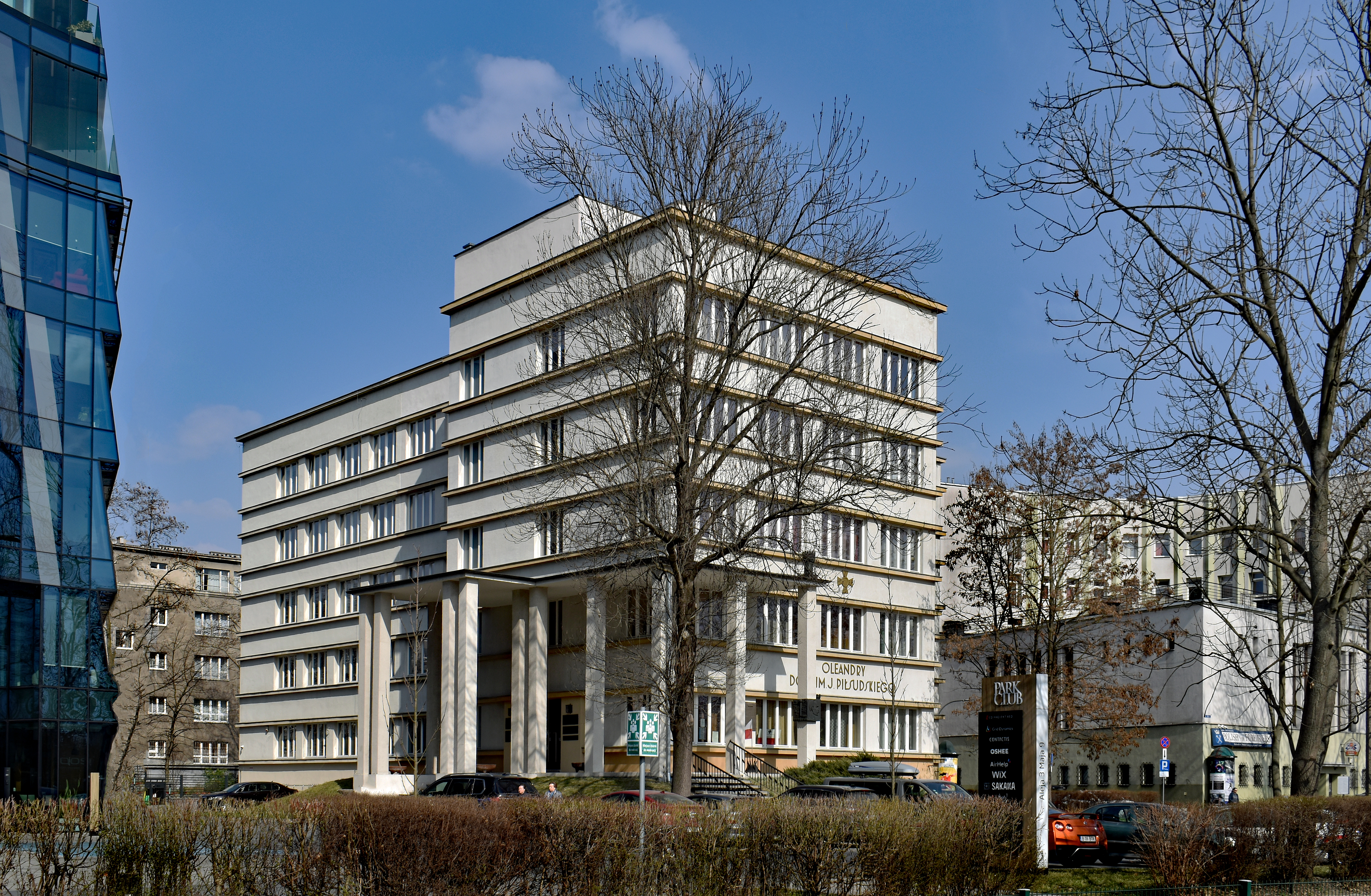
Oleandry J. Piłsudski House
7, 3 May Avenue, Kraków

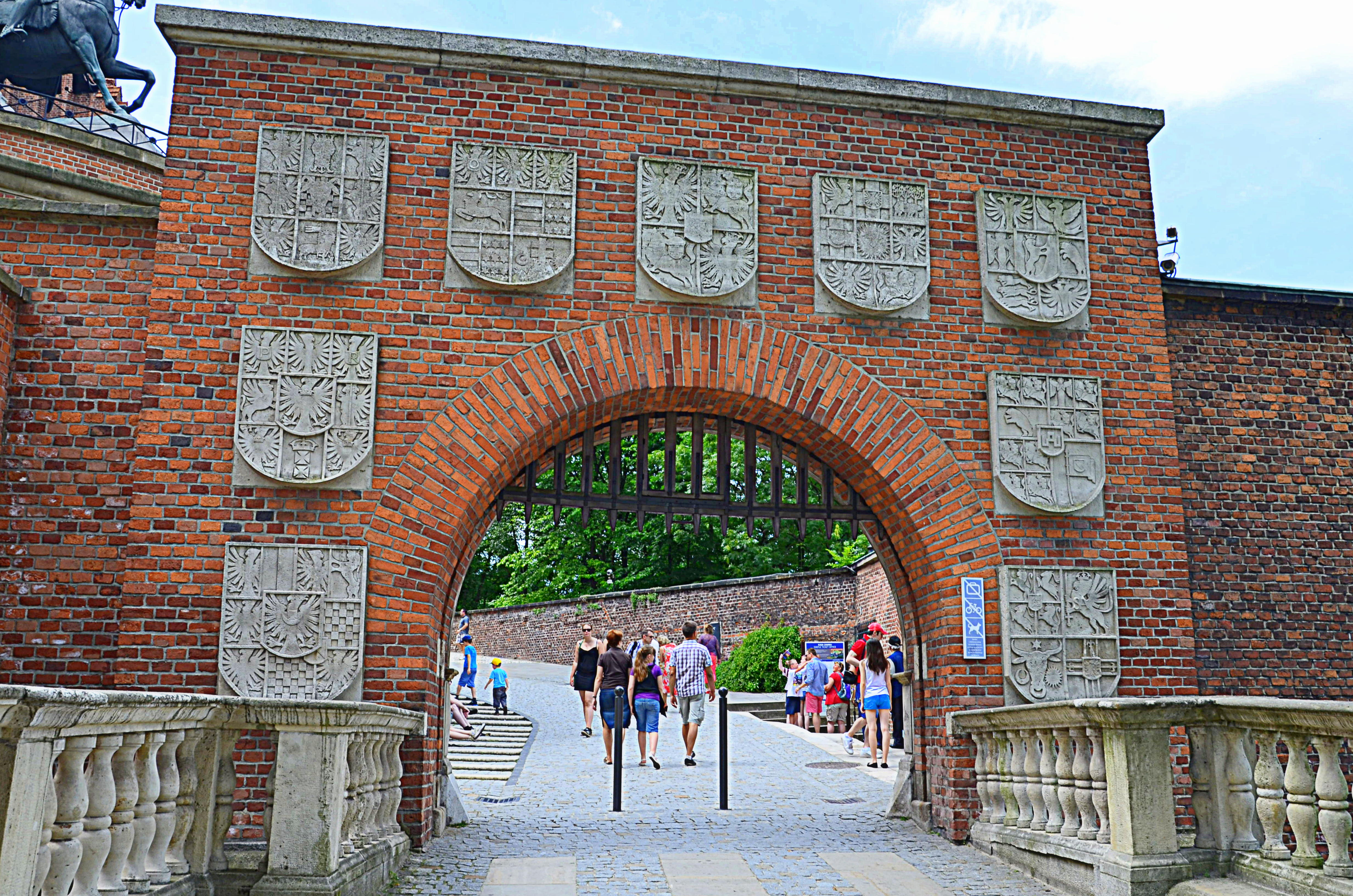
Wawel Coat of Arms Gate
Kraków, Poland

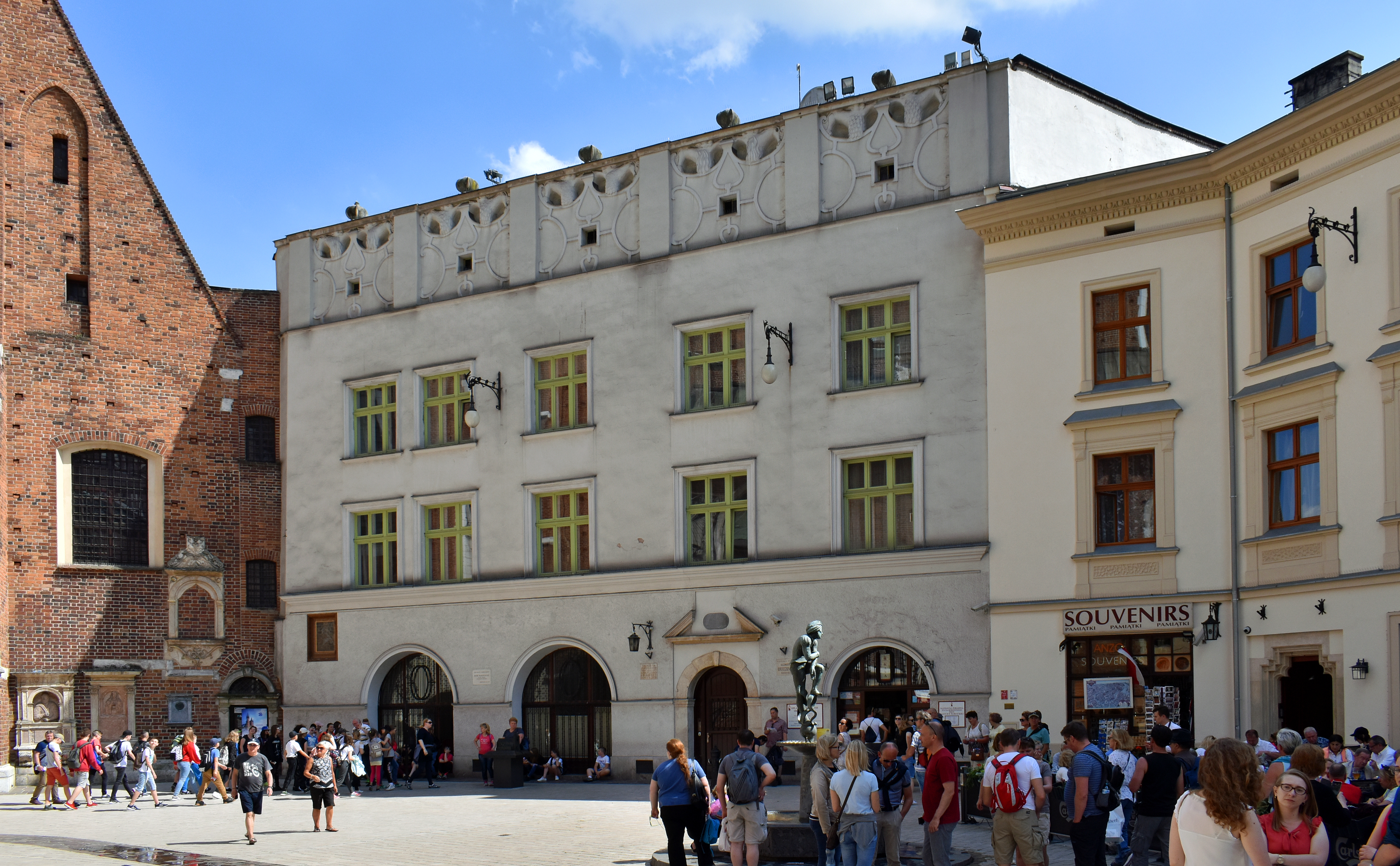
Tenement house
7 Mariacki Square, Old Town, Kraków
