= Kraków Fortress =

- Twierdza Kraków (Polish)
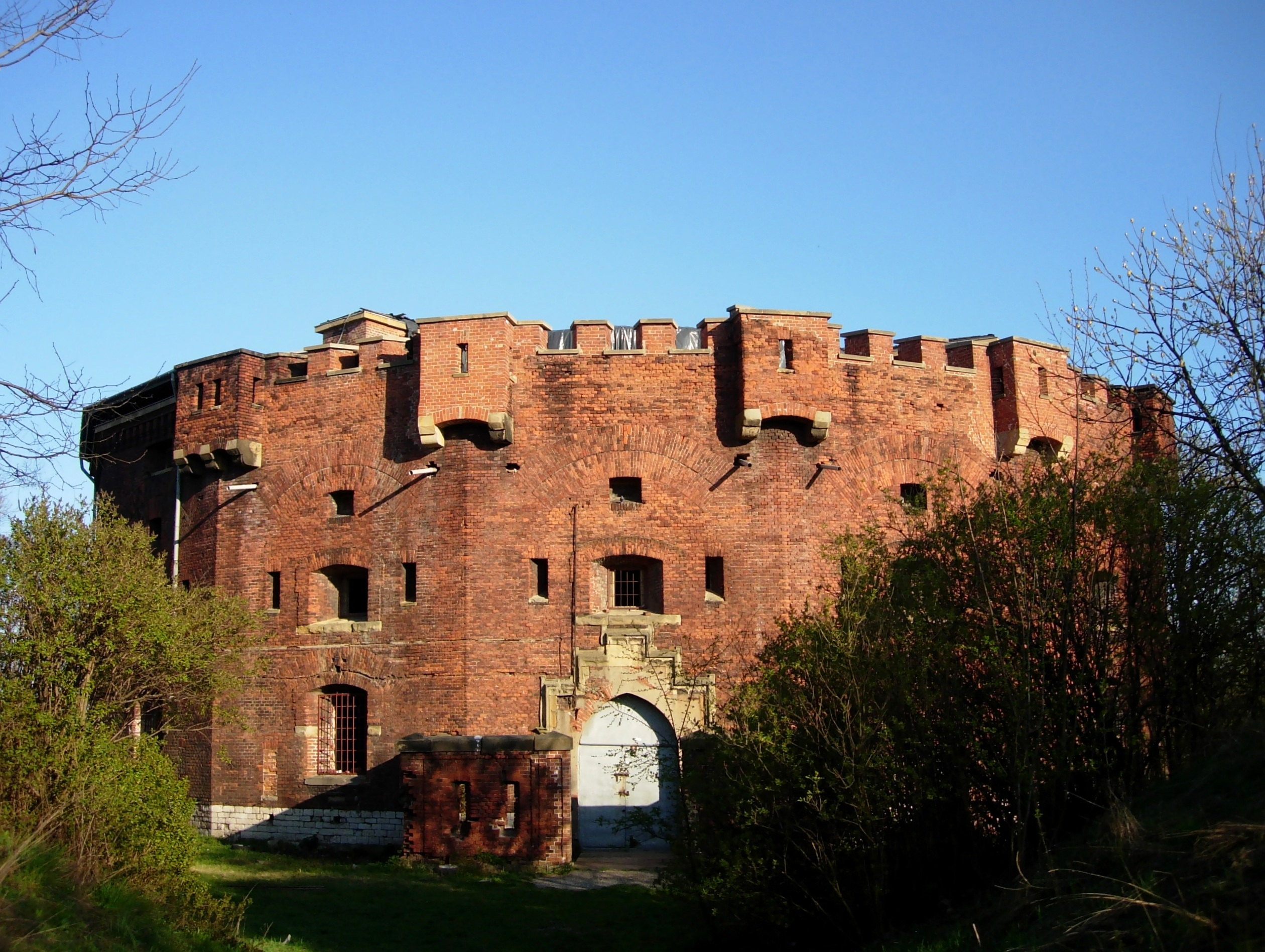
- Fort 31 "Benedykt" of the Kraków Fortress
- Interactive map of the Kraków Fortress area

General information
- Type: fortification
- Location: Kraków, Poland
- Coordinates: 50°03′41″N 19°56′14″E

Kraków fortress (Polish: Twierdza Kraków, German: Festung Krakau) refers in the narrow sense to the 19th century Austro-Hungarian fortifications, and in the larger sense - to the interconnected fortifications in Kraków, Poland, including 18th century Kościuszko Insurrection fortifications, and the medieval Wawel Castle and city walls.

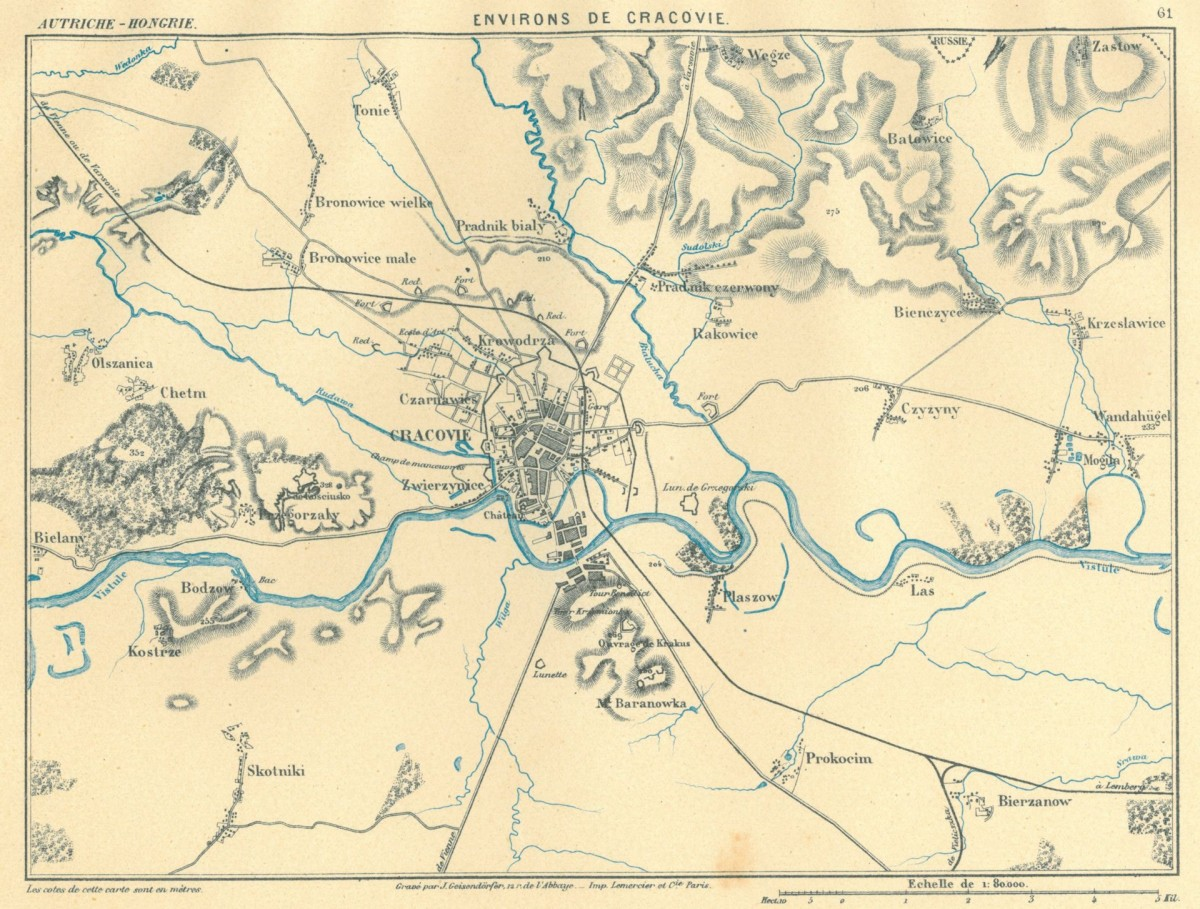
Kraków Fortress on a French map from 1881

== List of Fortifications ==
=== Citadel ===
- Wawel Citadel Fortress

=== The Inner Ring ===
==== Bastions ====
- Bastion III "Kleparz" – a standard reduit fortification from the 1856-1866 period. The live music venue Forty Kleparz is located here. It features a 200-person concert hall as well as two bars.

==== Citadel forts ====
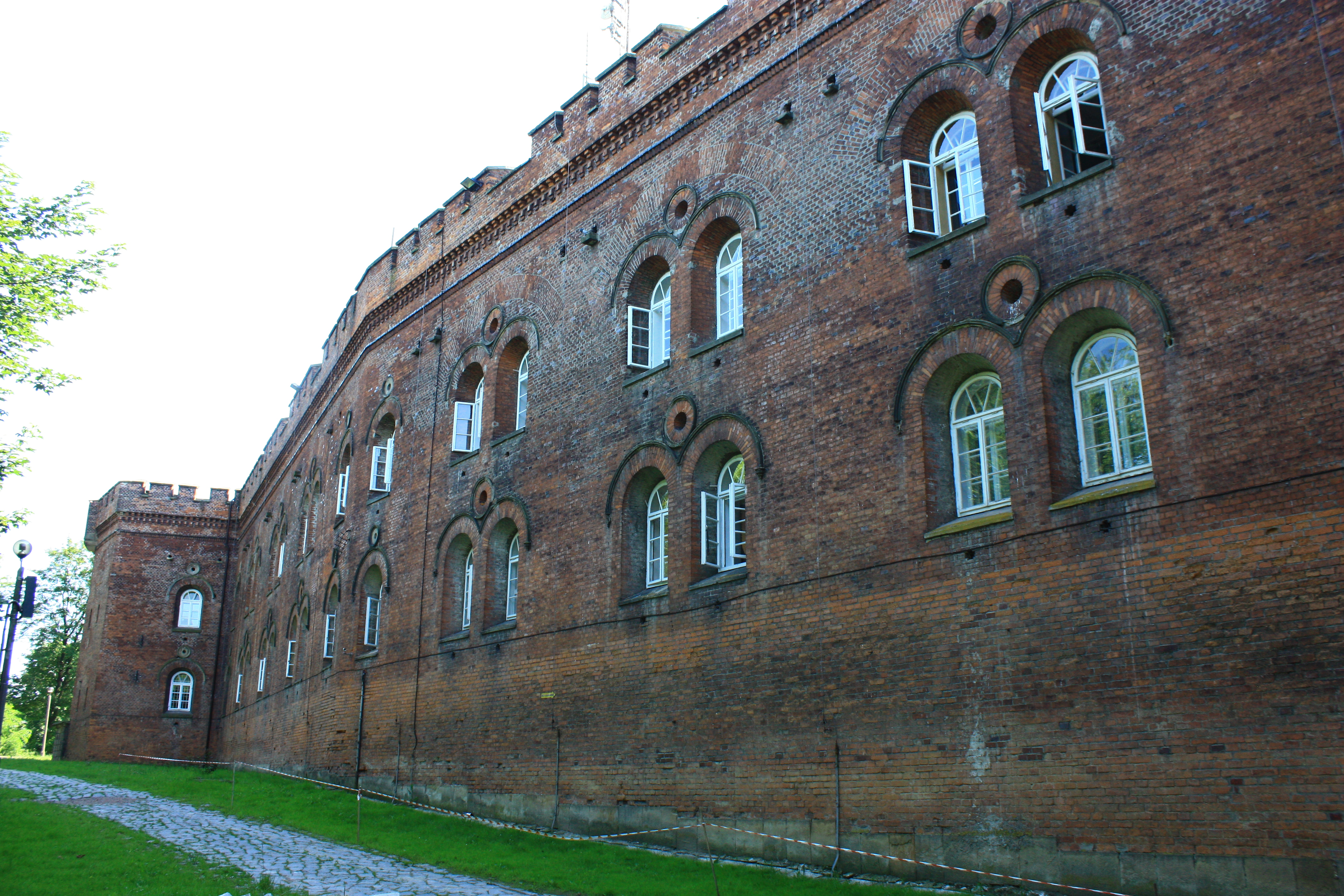
Fort citadel 2 "Kościuszko"

- Fort citadel 2 "Kosciuszko" - Built surrounding the Kościuszko Mound in 1850–56, and designed by Franz von Pidoll Quintenbock, Felix Księżarski and Bernard von Caboga. Today, the fort houses a museum devoted to Tadeusz Kościuszko, the radio station RMF FM, a hotel and cafes.

==== Tower forts ====
- Fort 31 "St. Benedict Fort" (Polish: Fort św. Benedykta) - the only one of three surviving fortresses built in Podgórze in the mid-19th century to protect the Vistula River and the road to Lviv. It is located atop the Krzemionki cliffs on Lasota Hill, and takes its name from the adjacent St. Benedict's church. The fortress quickly lost its usefulness in the 1890s. Since, it was used as an Austrian military barracks and converted into apartments in the 1950s. Today, it lies in general dereliction, filled with abandoned furniture and building materials. The fort has recently been transferred back to the property of the city of Kraków, with plans for its renovation awaiting approval.
- Fort 32 "Krzemionki" - The only other tower fort constructed in addition to the Fort 31 "St. Benedict" within the Krakow Fortress. In the 18th and 19th century, the fort was adapted to serve as barracks. Around 1954, the fort was demolished to make way for the construction of the Television Krakow building.

==== Reduit forts ====
- Fort 7 "Bronowice"
- Fort 12 "Luneta Warszawska"

=== The Outer Ring ===
==== Artillery forts ====
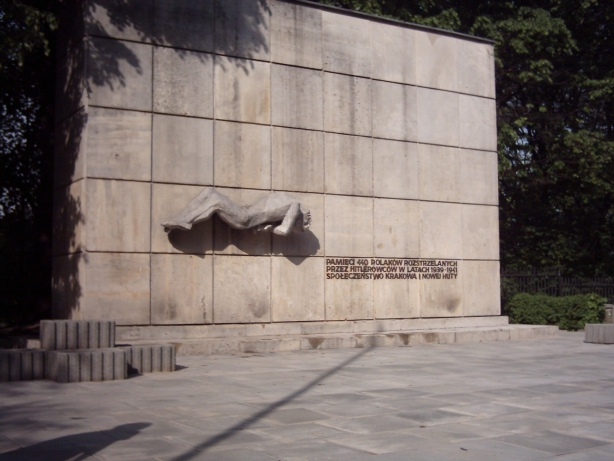
Memorial to 440 Poles murdered by the Germans in Fort 49 during World War II

- Fort 45 "Zielonki", today a hotel
- Fort 47 "Łysa Góra"
- Fort 48 "Batowice"
- Fort 49 "Krzesławice" - During the German occupation of Poland in the Second World War, it was the site of German massacres of Poles committed as part of the Intelligenzaktion and AB-Aktion. In 1945, 29 mass graves were discovered, with 440 victims, which were murdered from November 1939 to November 1940. In the forest of Fort 49, the German security police murdered around 1,300 Poles. Among the victims of the massacres in the fort and forest were Poles arrested in various towns and villages of the region, including Kraków, Nowy Sącz and Wadowice.
- Fort 50 "Prokocim"
- Fort 51 "Rajsko"
- Fort 52 "Borek"
- Fort 53 "Bodzów"

==== Armoured forts ====
- Fort 44 "Tonie"
- Fort 44a "Pękowice"
- Fort 45a "Bibice"
- Fort 48a "Mistrzejowice"
- Fort 49a "Dłubnia"
- Fort 52a "Łapianka"
- Fort 53a "Winnica"

== Gallery ==
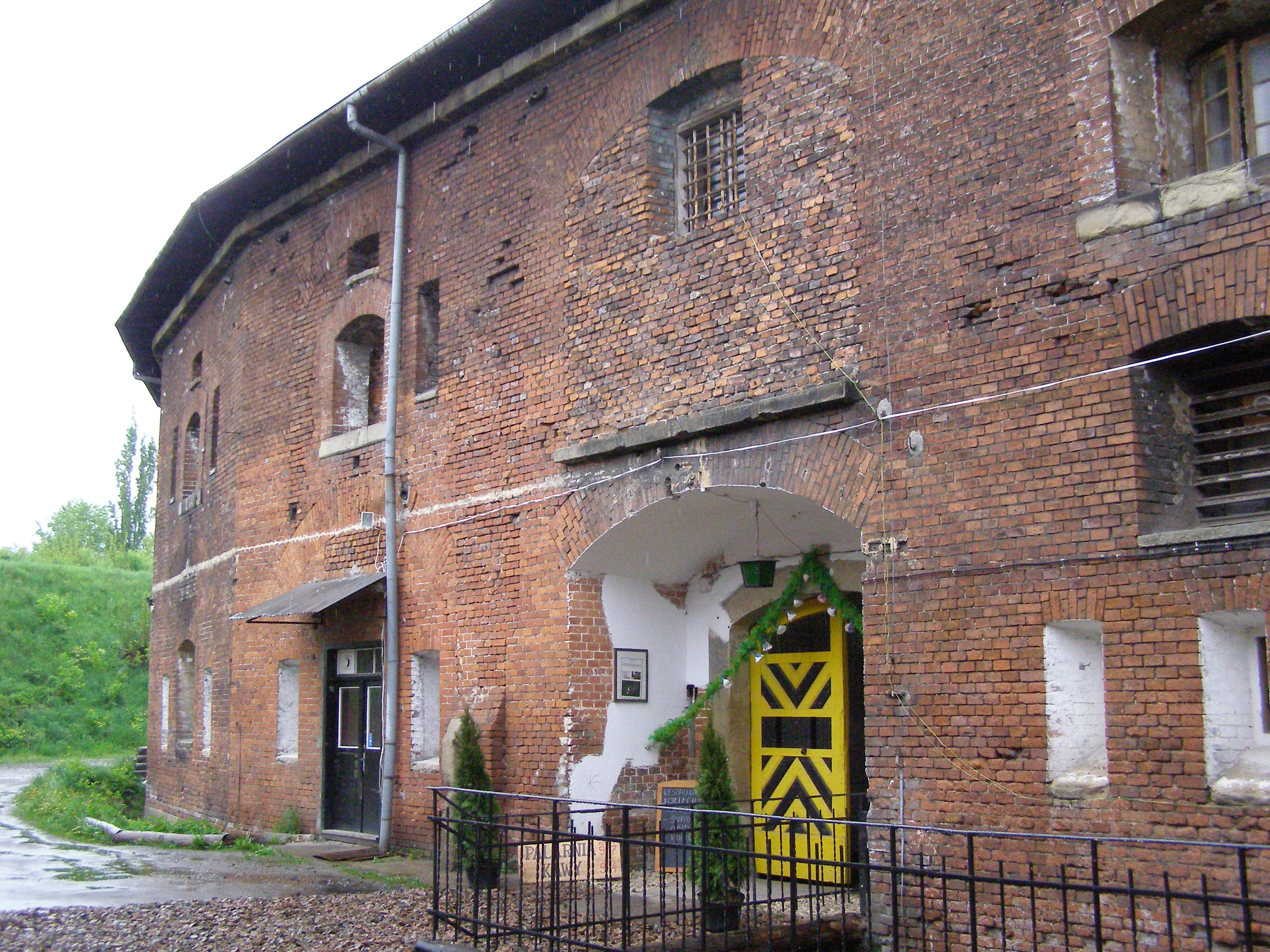
Fort 12 "Luneta Warszawska"

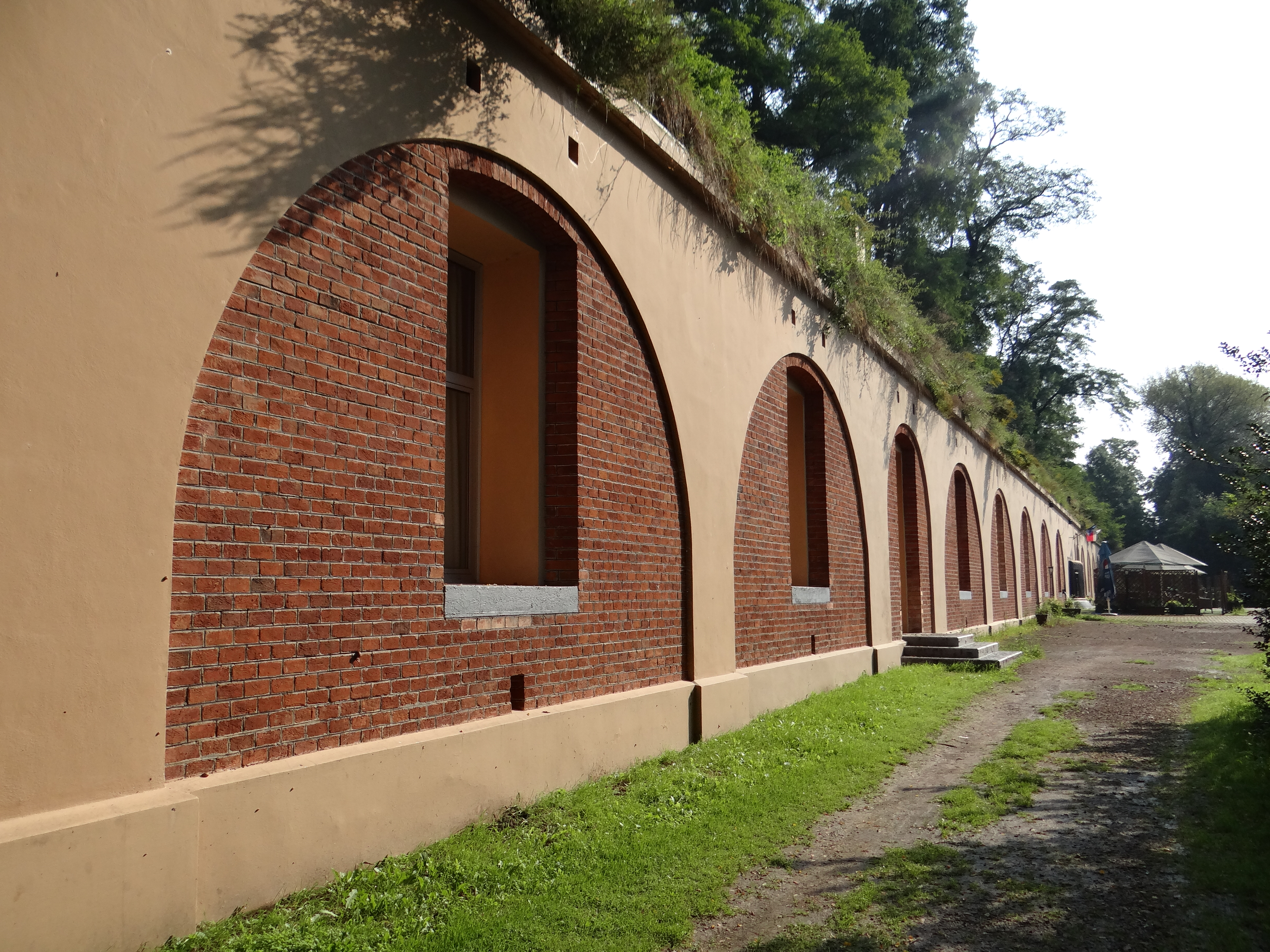
Fort 45 "Zielonki"

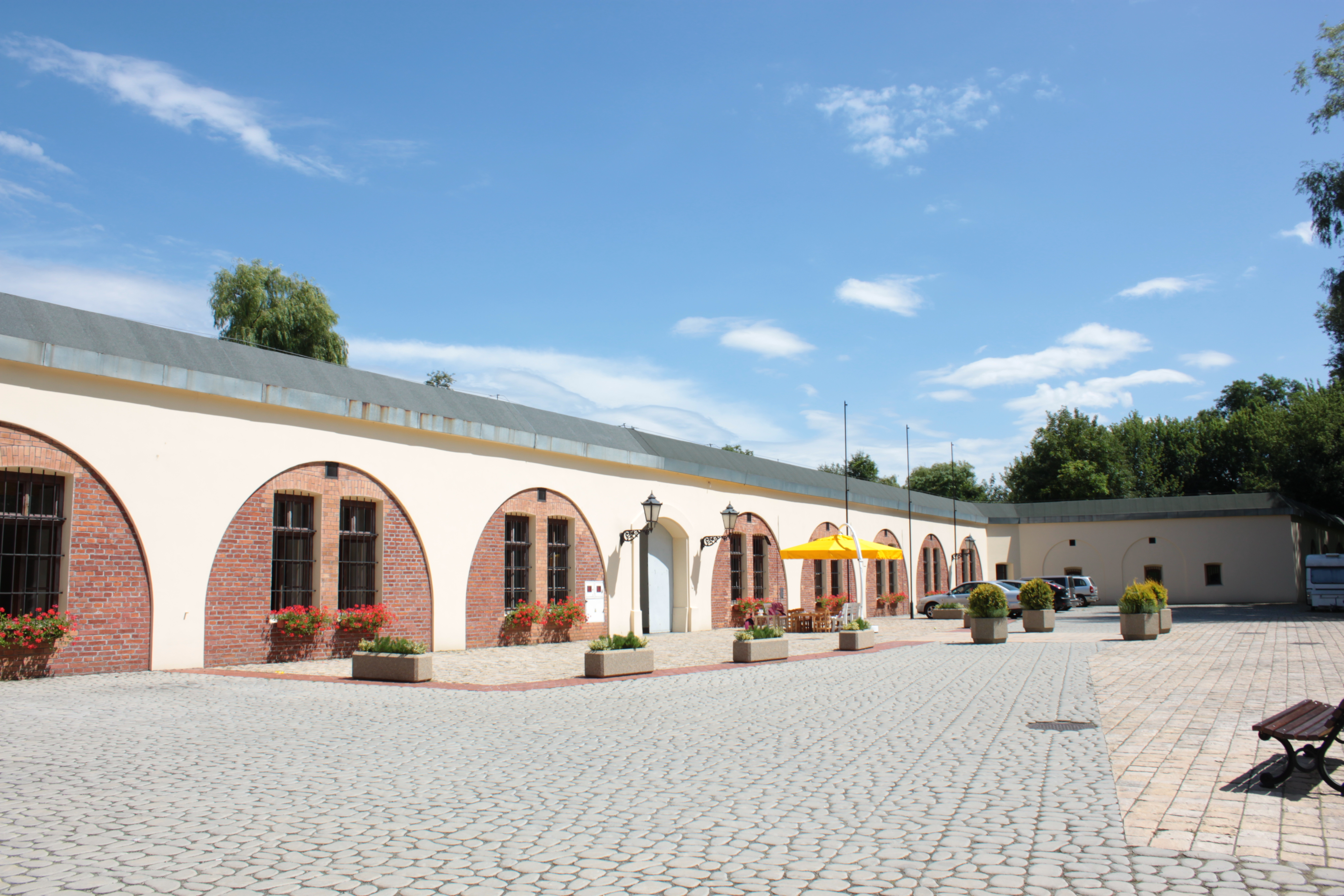
Fort 49 "Krzesławice"

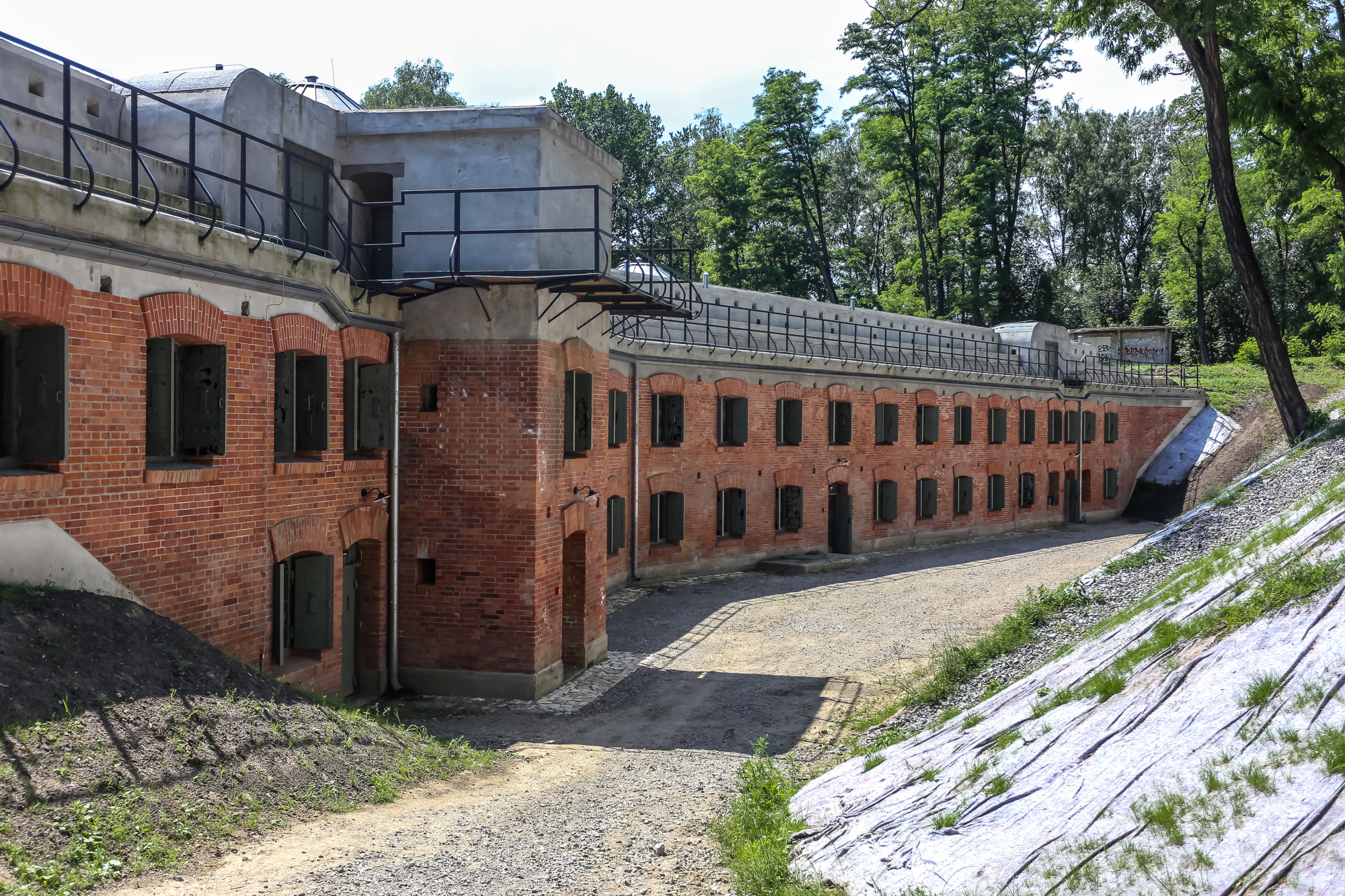
Fort 52a "Łapianka"

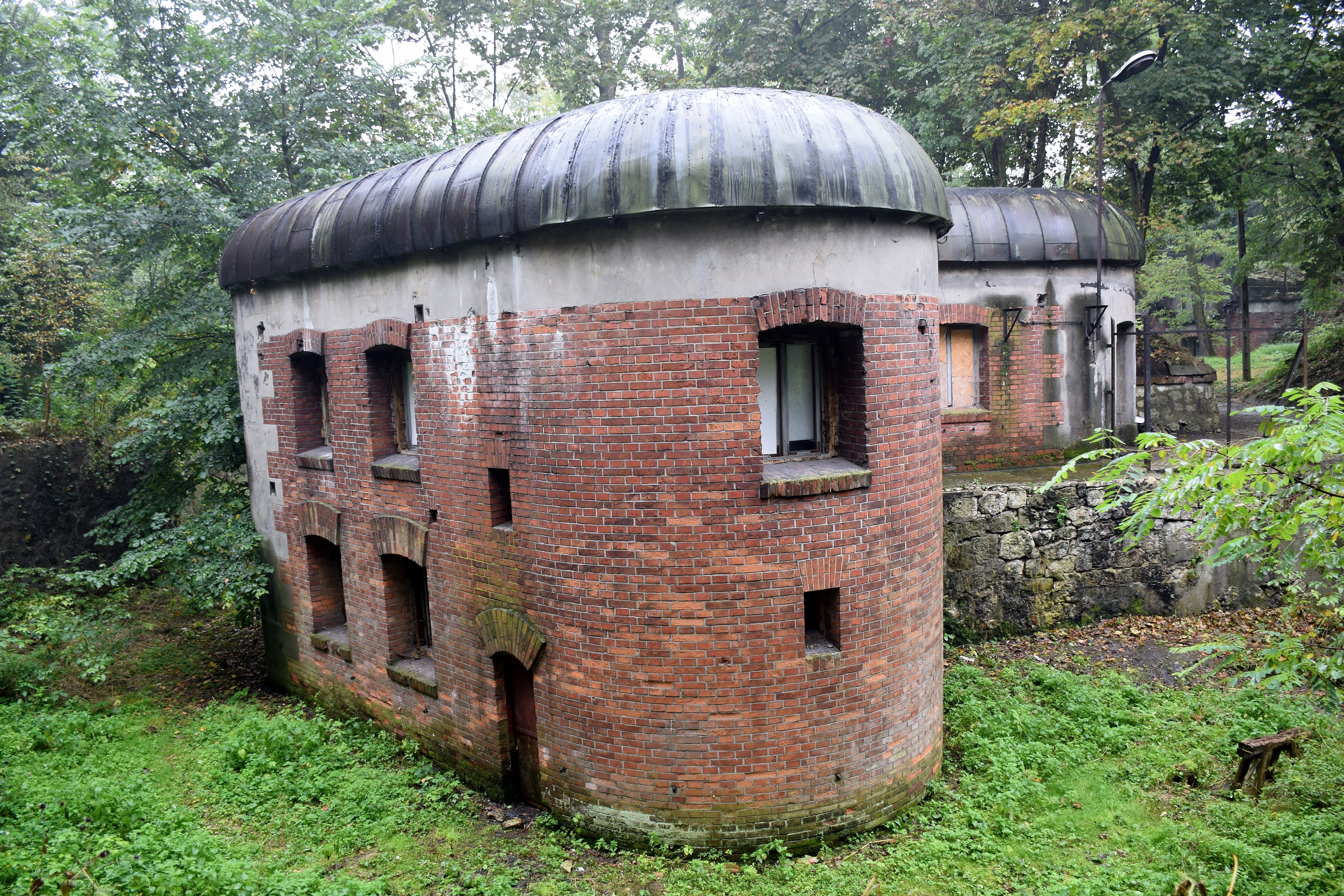
Fort 53a "Winnica"

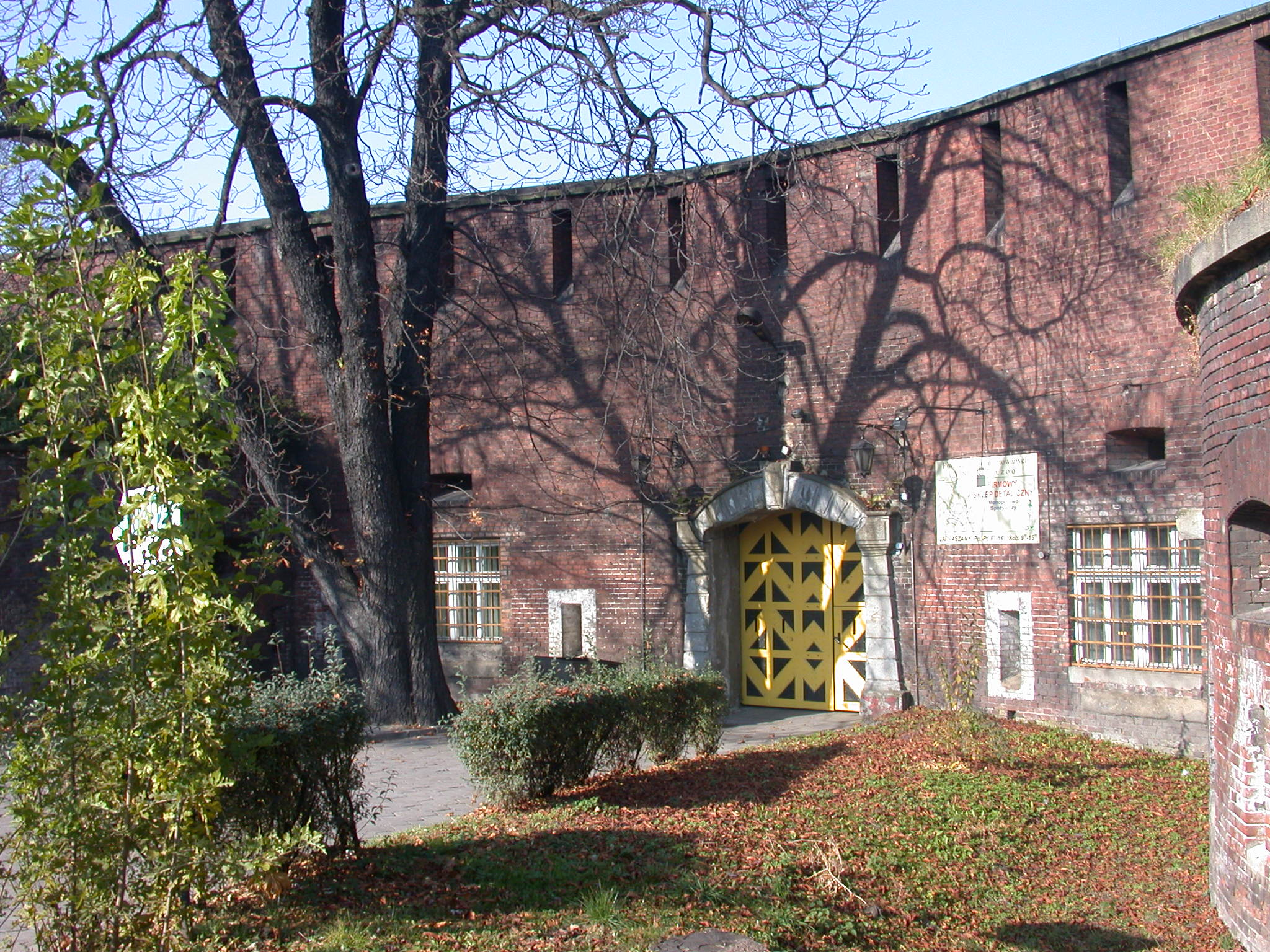
Bastion III "Kleparz"
