= Przegorzały =

Coordinates: 50°02′55″N 19°52′32″E

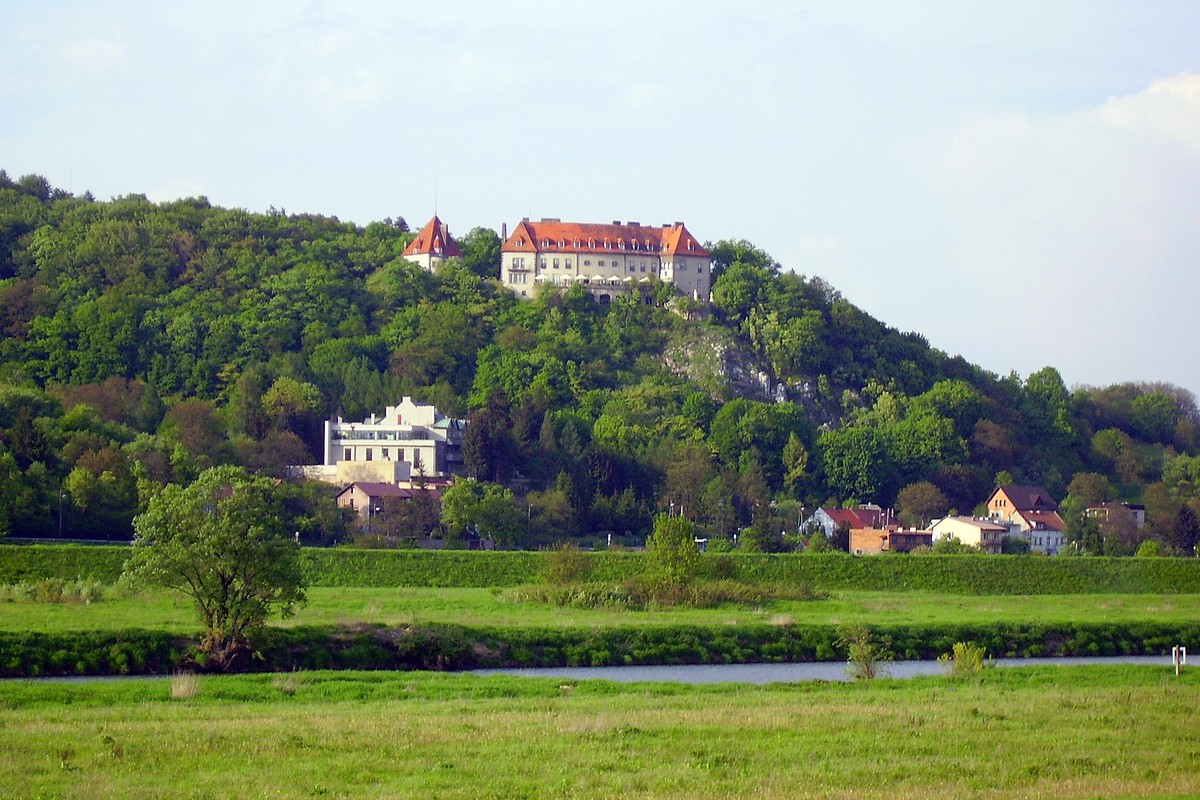
View of the Castle and Bastion from the south (right bank of the Vistula)

Przegorzały is a town in the Zwierzyniec district of Kraków (Poland), located 6.5 kilometres (4.0 mi) west of the city centre. Przegorzały is at the edge of the Wolski Woods, east of Bielany and west of the Kościuszko Mound, overlooking the Vistula river. It has several nature reserves and has retained a semi-rural character.

Originally a separate village, it was first mentioned in 1162 as the property of the Norbertine Sisters. Przegorzały was incorporated into the city of Kraków by the Nazi occupiers in 1941. During the Nazi occupation of Poland, over a thousand people (largely ethnic Poles accused of involvement in resistance against the Nazis) are believed to have been executed in Przegorzały at the spot known as Glinik.

The most famous building in Przegorzały is Przegorzały Castle. What is now known as the "Bastion" was built by the Polish art historian Adolf Szyszko-Bohusz as his own residence in the 1920s, naming it "Belvedere" after the beautiful view. Later, the occupying Nazis confiscated the building and added the larger "Schloss Wartenberg" as a residence for Otto Wächter and Luftwaffe officers. Currently, the buildings house the Institute of European Studies of the Jagiellonian University and a restaurant.
