= Wzgórza Krzesławickie =

- Dzielnica of Kraków
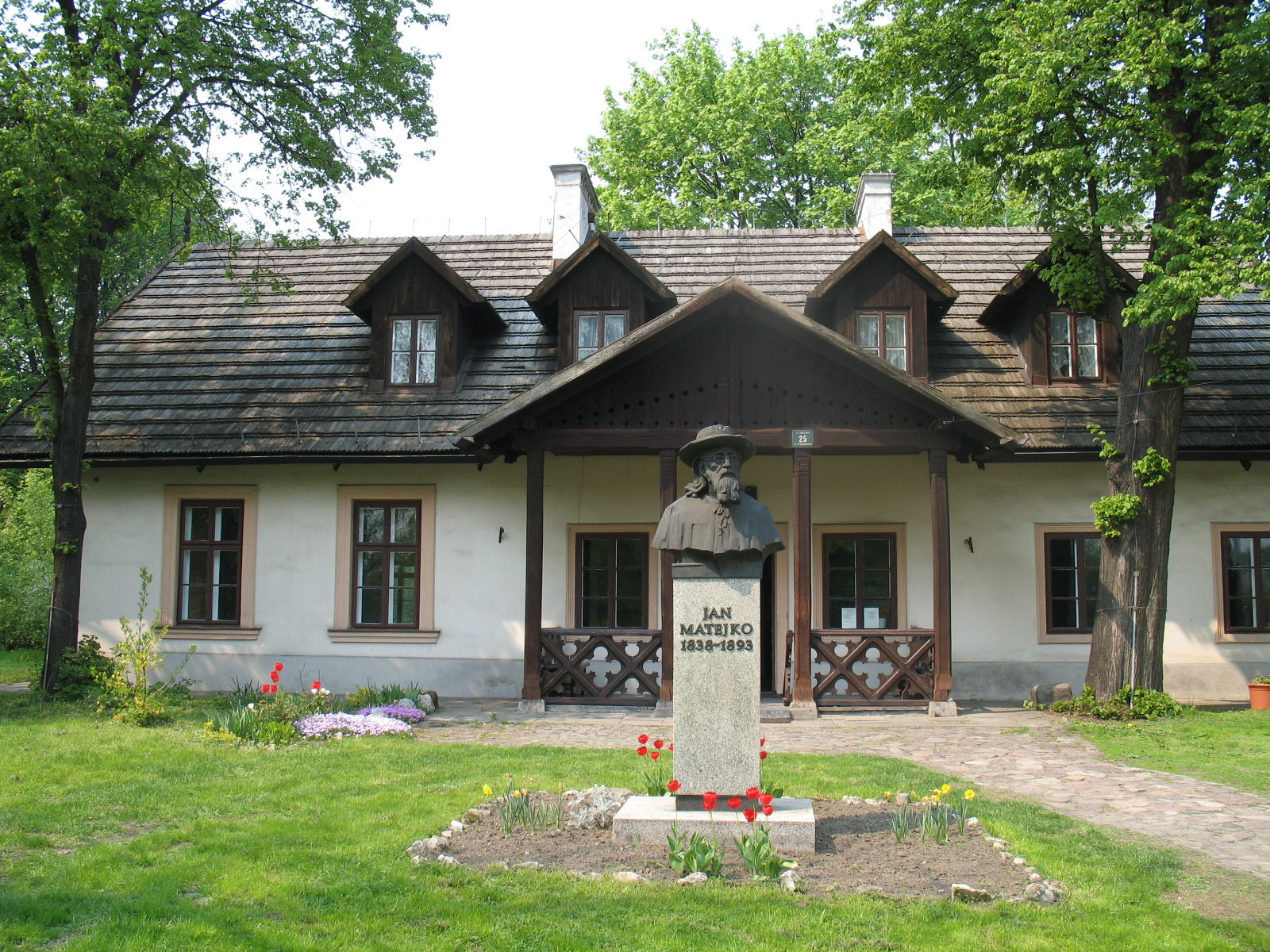
- Jan Matejko Manor

- Location of Wzgórza Krzesławickie within Kraków
- Coordinates: 50°6′7″N 20°4′49.79″E
- Country: Poland
- Voivodeship: Lesser Poland
- County/City: Kraków

Government
  - President: Stanisław Madej

Area
  - Total: 23.82 km^{2} (9.20 sq mi)

Population (2014)
  - Total: 20,303
  - Density: 852.4/km^{2} (2,208/sq mi)
- Time zone: UTC+1 (CET)
  - Summer (DST): UTC+2 (CEST)
- Area code: +48 12
- Website: http://www.dzielnica17.krakow.pl

Wzgórza Krzesławickie is one of 18 districts of Kraków, located in the northeast part of the city. The name Wzgórza Krzesławickie comes from a village named Krzesławice (first mentioned in 1228) that is now a part of the district.

According to the Central Statistical Office data, the district's area is 23.82 square kilometres (9.20 square miles) and 20 303 people inhabit Wzgórza Krzesławickie.

== Subdivisions of Wzgórza Krzesławickie ==
Wzgórza Krzesławickie is divided into smaller subdivisions (osiedles). Here's a list of them.

- Dłubnia
- Grębałów
- Kantorowice
- Krzesławice
- Lubocza
- Łuczanowice
- Osiedle Na Stoku
- Osiedle Na Wzgórzach
- Wadów
- Węgrzynowice
- Zesławice
