= Justus Ludwik Decjusz =

Polish diplomat (1485–1545)

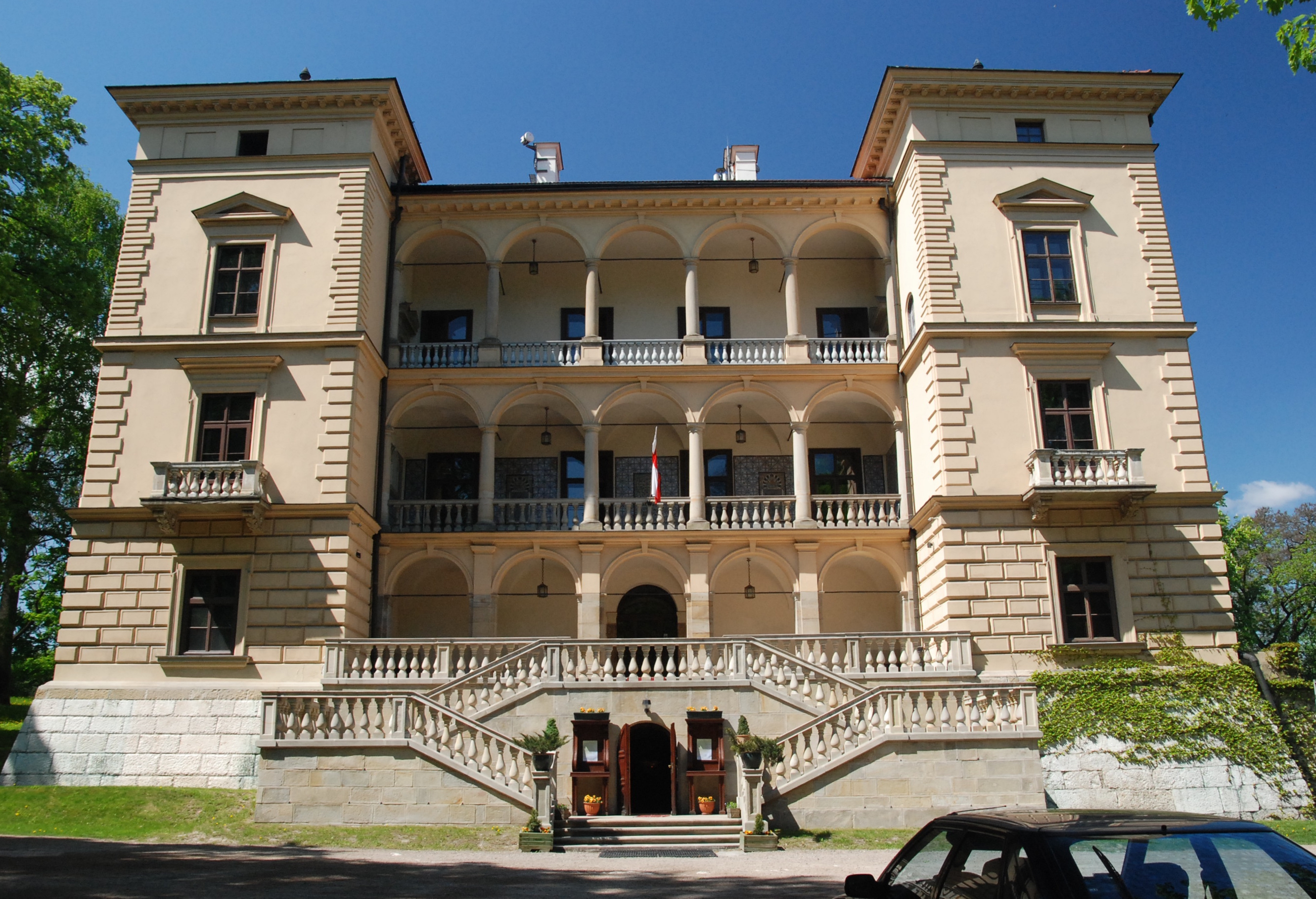
Decjusz's Villa in Wola Justowska, Kraków

Justus Ludwik Decjusz (German: Jost Ludwig Dietz, Latin: Iodocus Ludovicus Decius; 1485–1545) was a Polish burgher and diplomat of German descent in 16th-century Kraków. He served as a finance minister and secretary to the Polish king Sigismund I the Old.

Originally from Alsace, Decjusz's career peaked with his appointment as the king's personal adviser and overseer of the royal mint. He was also the author of a widely circulated text "De vetustatibus Polonorum" (Polish: O starożytności Polaków, On the Ancient Origins of the Poles), an early version of the Sarmatian myth about the origin of the Polish kings. He also wrote "Księga o czasach króla Zygmunta" (A chronicle of the times of Zygmunt), based on personal observation and experience, which has served as a widely used primary source on 16th-century Poland.

In 1528 Decjusz bought the villages Przegorzały and Wola Chełmska near Kraków (currently both are part of a suburb of the city Wola Justowska, named after him) and built a villa, designed by Italian architects. The work, finished in 1535, took seven years to complete. It became a meeting place for local residents of diverse ethnic and cultural backgrounds to discuss issues of the day, politics and religious matters. The practice is continued today by the Stowarzyszenie Willa Decjusza (Organization Decjusz's Villa), which is located in the building.
