= Kraków-Rakowice-Czyżyny Airport =

Coordinates: 50.08226°N 19.99889°E

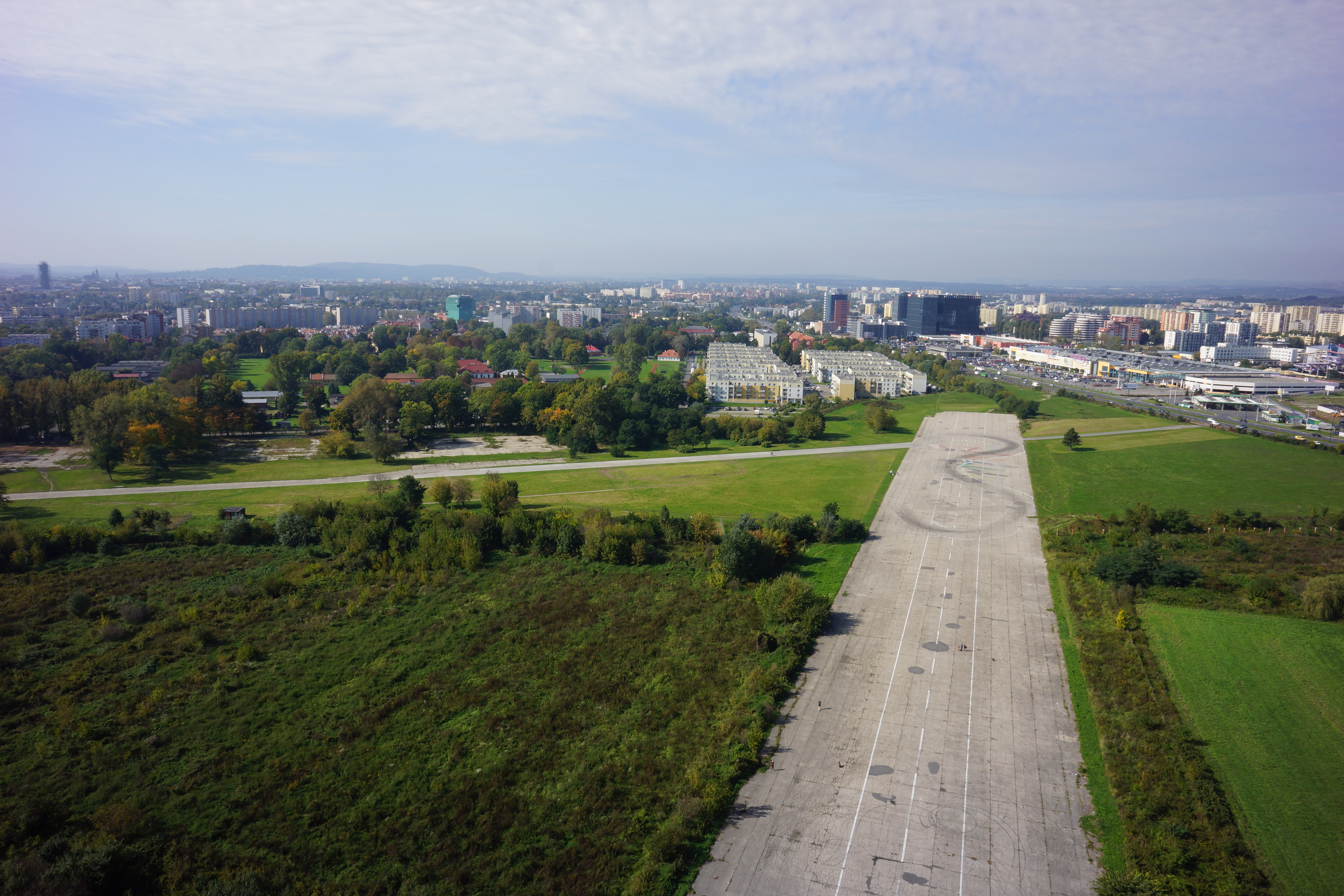
Runway

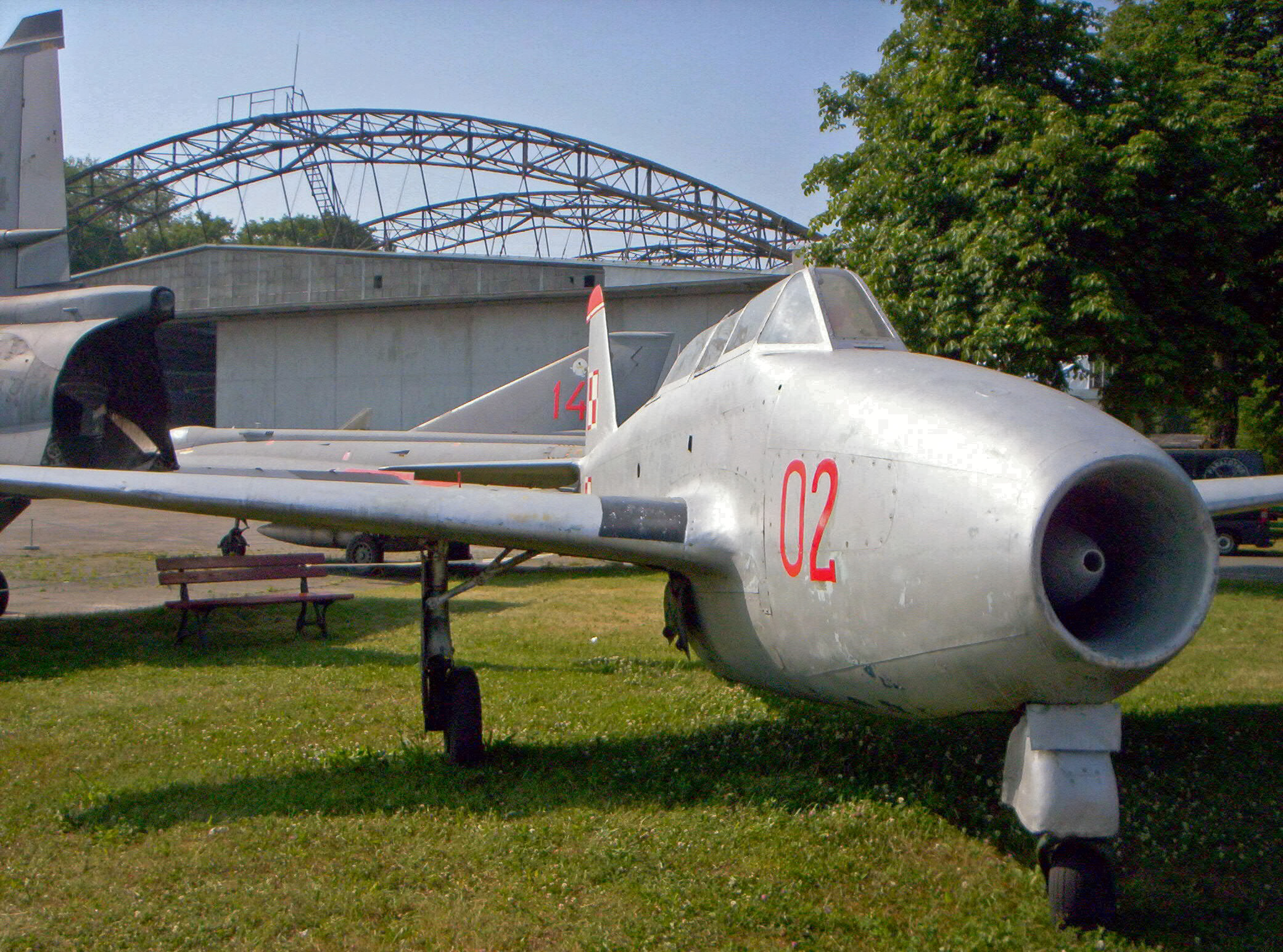
Outdoor display at the airport museum

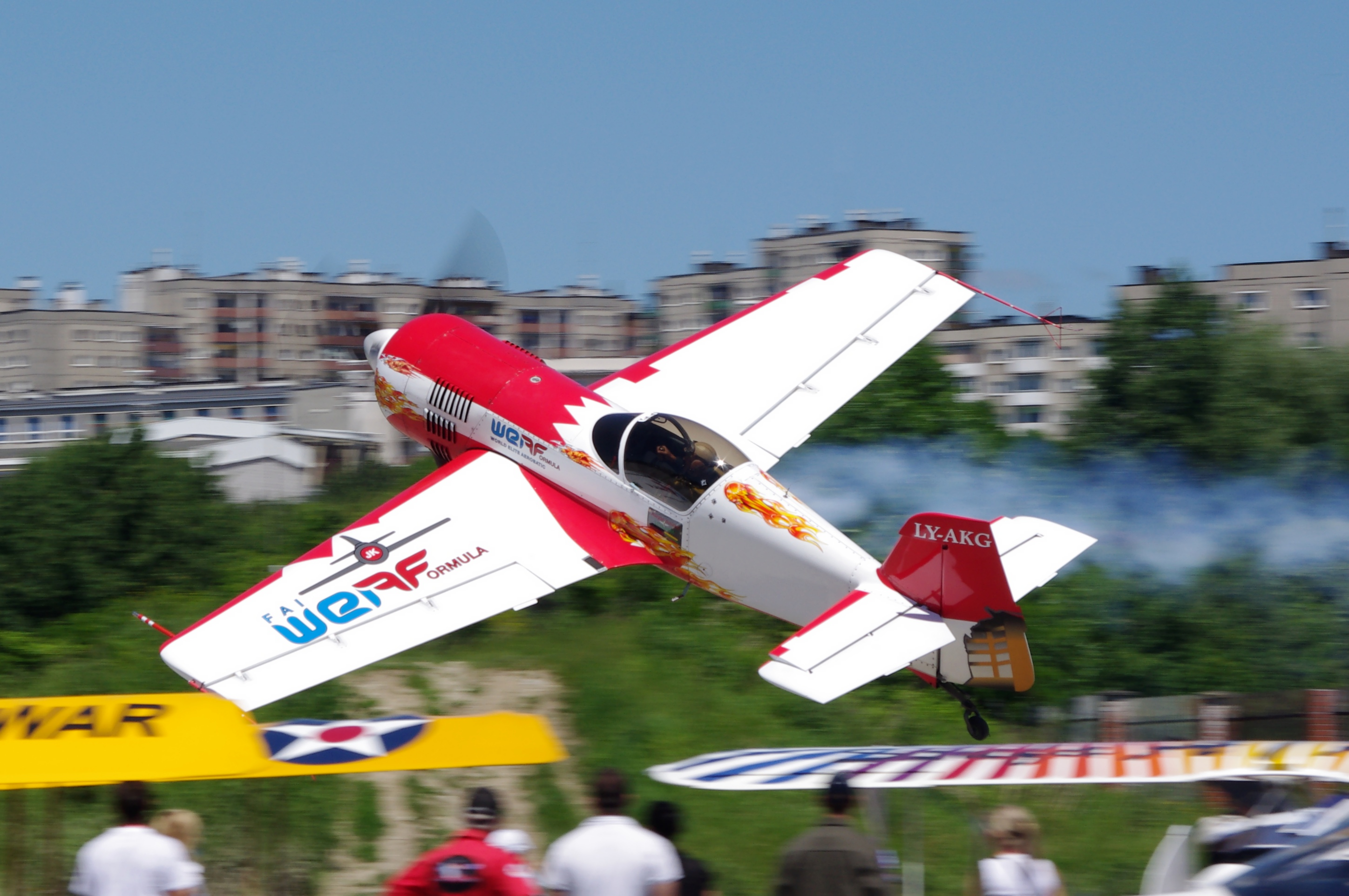
Su-26 lift-off during air show at the historic Rakowice-Czyżyny Airport

Kraków-Rakowice-Czyżyny Airport is a disused airport in Kraków, Poland, one of the oldest permanent airfields in Europe, open for occasional traffic by certain types of aircraft. A portion of it is now the site of the Polish Aviation Museum with a 720-metre long and 60-metre wide segment of the original concrete runway restored for use by the museum for light planes (to 7,500 kg) and helicopters.

== History ==
The airfield has its beginnings as a military airport established in the borough of Rakowice in 1912, one of the most modern and largest in Poland at the time. It was built for the needs of the Austro-Hungarian Empire along with an army garrison. In 1917, the airfield became one of the stopovers in the first European air mail service linking Vienna with Kyiv and Odessa. The airport was in continuous use to 1963, until the relocation of the Kraków passenger airport 16 km westwards, to the village of Balice. The expansion of nearby Nowa Huta district of Kraków forced its closure.

In June 2004, a portion of the airport contiguous with the Polish Aviation Museum was reopened as a police helicopter base and for an occasional fixed-wing aircraft traffic on runway 26 for an annual two-day air show held on the last weekend of June. The museum is also likely to use this airfield for flying some of its collection or acquiring new exhibits.

Since 2009, the airport has been a location of Live Music Festival.
