= Rakowice, Kraków =

Area of Katowice

Rakowice
- Neighbourhood
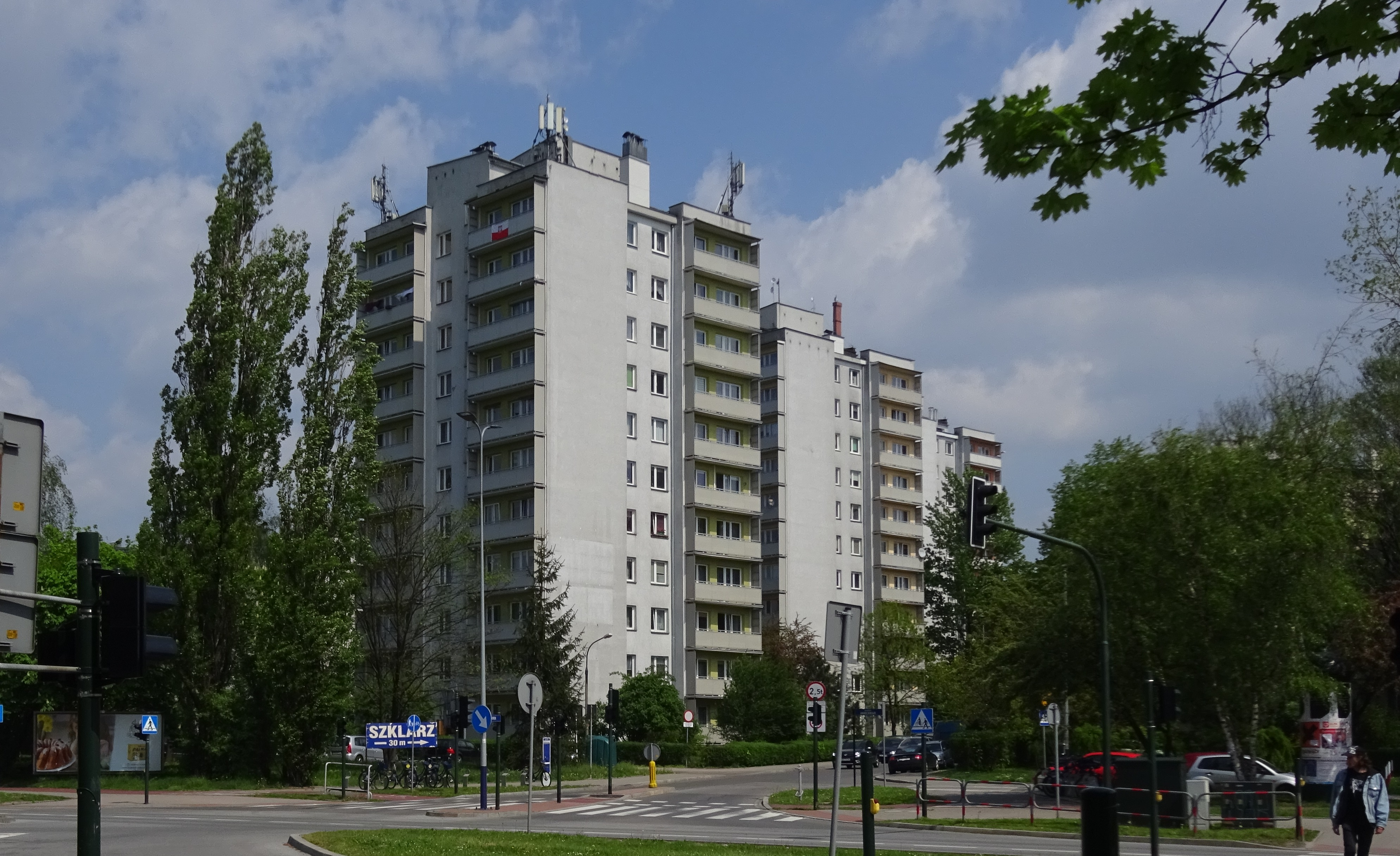
- Interactive map of Rakowice
- Country: Poland
- Voivodeship: Lesser Poland
- Powiat: Kraków
- Dzielnica: Prądnik Czerwony; Czyżyny

Rakowice, formerly a village, is an urban area of Kraków, Poland, part of both: District III Prądnik Czerwony and District XIV Czyżyny. Currently, the neighborhood is heavily urbanized, with a small amount of parks. The predominant structures are apartment buildings and detached houses. Rakowice is often confused with the Rakowicki Cemetery and Rakowicka street – the old 2-kilometre-long (1.2 mi) road leading to former village.

== History of Rakowice ==
The first information about the area formerly known as village Rakowice originates from 1244. In the 15th century it consisted of a cluster of farms and a mill. Until the end of the First Republic the village belonged to the Royal Crown. At the beginning of the 20th century a new monastery was built there by the Piarist Order – the oldest Catholic educational order also known as the Poor Clerics of the Mother of God. At present, the monastery building serves as the local High School.

In the years 1912–1918 the crumbling Austria-Hungary built an airport in Rakowice, one of the most modern and largest in Poland at the time. In the interwar period the area first developed into a residential neighborhood, and after World War II there has been further urbanization there. Rakowice were incorporated into Kraków in 1941. It is the site of osiedle Wieczysta, and osiedle Ugorek (1960–1967).

== Points of interest ==
- Church of the Holy Name of Mary
- Historic Airport Kraków-Rakowice-Czyżyny
- The Stanisław Konarski High School at the former Piarist monastery
