= Lubocza, Kraków =

Coordinates: 50°05′41″N 20°05′20″E

Wzgórza Krzesławickie, District XVII of Kraków, Poland

Lubocza, formerly a village on the outskirts of Kraków, Poland, is now a borough of District XVII (known as Wzgórza Krzesławickie). Lubocza village was first joined to the Nowa Huta District on January 1, 1951. It became a borough of Wzgórza Krzesławickie when a new district, District XVII, was split off from Nowa Huta in 1990.

== History ==
Lubocza was first mentioned in the privileges of Bolesław Wstydliwy on May 30, 1254, in Korczyn. This document confirms the ownership of the village by the Norbertine Sisters from Zwierzyniec. The sisters owned 37 villages, including Lubocza. From December 13, 1527, comes a copy of this document - is the diploma of Zygmunt Stary. In 1276 the village was given Magdeburg rights by the burghers of Kraków.

The Folwark and the Dwór were built in 1780. Probably 1794 years passed this way Tadeusz Kościuszko aiming with his troops into Połaniec. In 1914 approximately half of the village (47 houses, and a number of fruit trees) were torn down by the Austrian army. The wood from the walls of houses was used to build bunkers and trenches, and the population of the village was evacuated to the suburbs of Kraków. In March 1915, the population returned to their homes when the Russians withdrew in the face of the advancing Prussian army. At that time in the village there were two carpenters, two shoemakers, two forges and two private grocery stores.

In 1928 came (for the metropolitan councils of Prince Adam Stefan Sapieha) Norbertine sisters, to give children a free, Catholic education. For this purpose, the former house of the steward. Monastery Zwierzyniecki took upon himself the repair, maintenance equipment and sisters. It was an act of gratitude for the recovery of misappropriated by village multi-tenant Grzymków. Nurseries of that dedication was October 17, 1928. From May 3, 1930, Lubocza had its own volunteer fire department (which was merged into the fire department of Nowa Huta when the village joined that district in 1950). In 1936 the People's House was built (thanks to the strenuous efforts of the Council Gromadzki); it focused on cultural and social life, and contained, among other things, a stage and a shop.

On September 5, 1939, the German army invaded the village and requisitioned Primary School No. 78 in Kraków as quarters for its soldiers. On January 18, 1945, the bulk of the German forces withdrew from the village. On the next day a skirmish between the Germans and the Red Army resulted in the deaths of a number of Germans and the destruction of two tanks: one German and one Soviet.

Lubocza was electrified on September 20, 1946. On January 1, 1951, Lubocza was incorporated into Kraków.

== Transportation ==
The district is served by the following MPK bus routes: 110 (Aleja Przyjażni - Węgrzynowice), 160 (Aleja Przyjaźni - Ruszcza/Pleszów), 242 (Kombinat - Krzysztoforzyce) and 272 (Kombinat - Kocmyrzów-Luborzyca Urząd Gminy).
