= Districts of Kraków =

Polish districts

Map of districts of the City of Kraków

Interactive map. For more information, click on district number.

The city of Kraków is divided into 18 administrative districts, each with a degree of autonomy within the municipal government. The Polish name for such a district is dzielnica.

The oldest neighborhoods of Kraków were incorporated into the city before the late 18th century. They include the Old Town (Stare Miasto), once contained within the city defensive walls and now encircled by the Planty park; the Wawel, which is the site of the Royal Castle and the Cathedral; Stradom and Kazimierz, the latter originally divided into Christian and Jewish quarters; as well as the ancient town of Kleparz.

Major districts added in the 19th and 20th centuries include Podgórze, which until 1915 was a separate town on the southern bank of the Vistula, and Nowa Huta, east of the city centre, built after World War II and incorporated into the city in 1951. Between 1951 and 1973 the city was divided into six districts: Stare Miasto, Zwierzyniec, Kleparz, Grzegórzki, Podgórze and Nowa Huta. From 1973 until the introduction of the present division in 1991 there were four districts: Śródmieście ("City Centre"), Podgórze, Krowodrza and Nowa Huta.

The current division was introduced on 27 March 1991 and revised by Kraków City Council on 19 April 1995. The districts were assigned Roman numerals as well as names. The names and numbers of the 18 districts are now as follows: Stare Miasto (I), Grzegórzki (II), Prądnik Czerwony (III), Prądnik Biały (IV), Krowodrza (V), Bronowice (VI), Zwierzyniec (VII), Dębniki (VIII), Łagiewniki-Borek Fałęcki (IX), Swoszowice (X), Podgórze Duchackie (XI), Bieżanów-Prokocim (XII), Podgórze (XIII), Czyżyny (XIV), Mistrzejowice (XV), Bieńczyce (XVI), Wzgórza Krzesławickie (XVII), and Nowa Huta (XVIII).

== District I Old Town ==
District I

District I Old Town (Polish: Dzielnica I Stare Miasto), it consists of the historic, former quarters: Old Town, Wawel, the former Jewish quarter of Kazimierz, Nowy Świat, Kleparz, Okół, Piasek, Stradom, Wesoła (part), Krowodrza (part) and Warszawskie (part). The Historic Centre of Kraków, covering the Old Town, Wawel and Kazimierz, was entered on the UNESCO list of World Heritage Sites in 1978.

== Grzegórzki ==
Grzegórzki

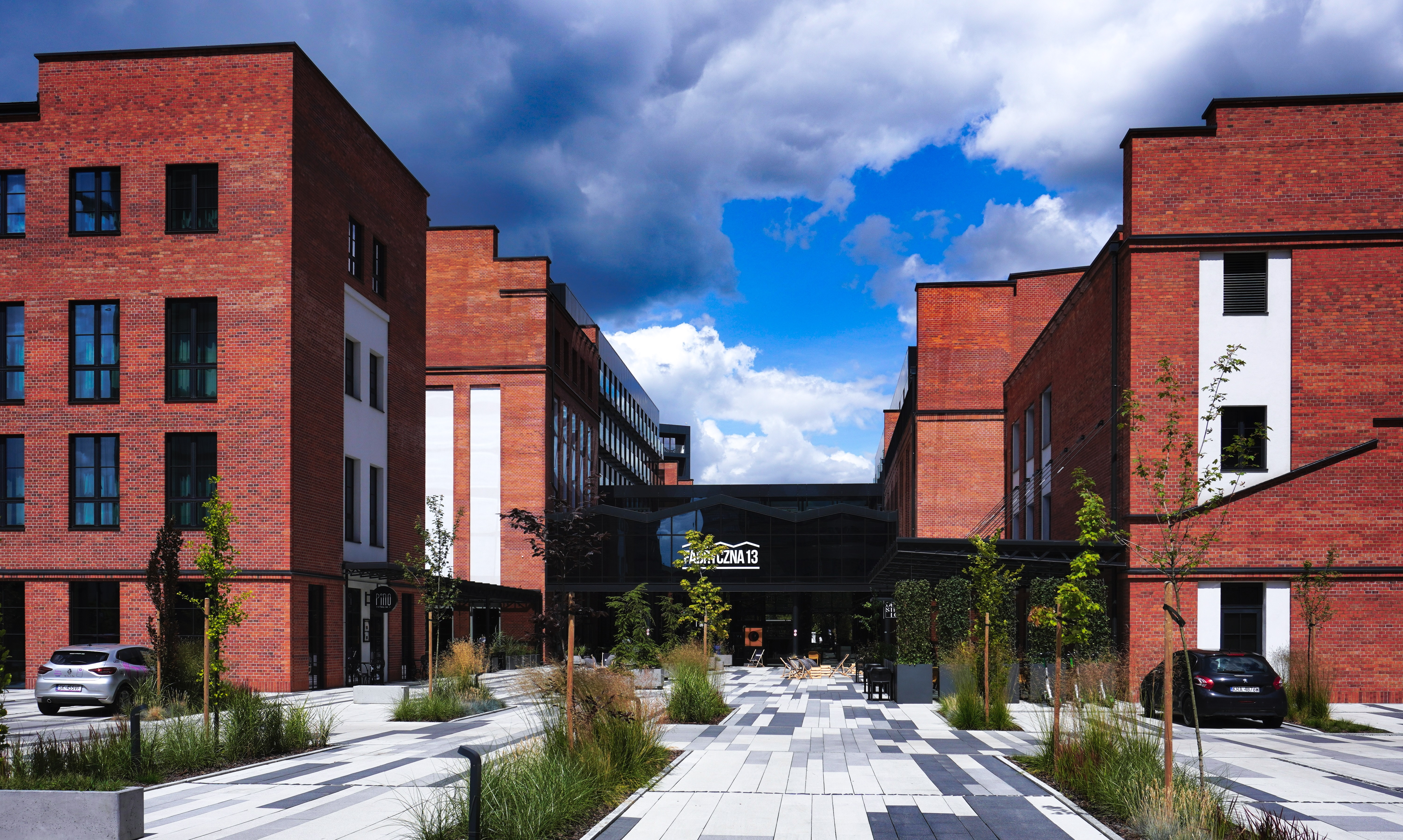
Fabryczna City complex in a former destillery

Grzegórzki is Kraków's Administrative District No. II. Until 1990 it was a part of District No. I (Stare Miasto). It borders the districts of Stare Miasto to the west, Prądnik Czerwony to the north, Czyżyny to the east, and Podgórze across the river to the south. It consists of neighbourhoods called Dąbie, Grzegórzki, Olsza (partly in Prądnik Czerwony), Osiedle Oficerskie and Wesoła.

== Prądnik Czerwony ==
Prądnik Czerwony

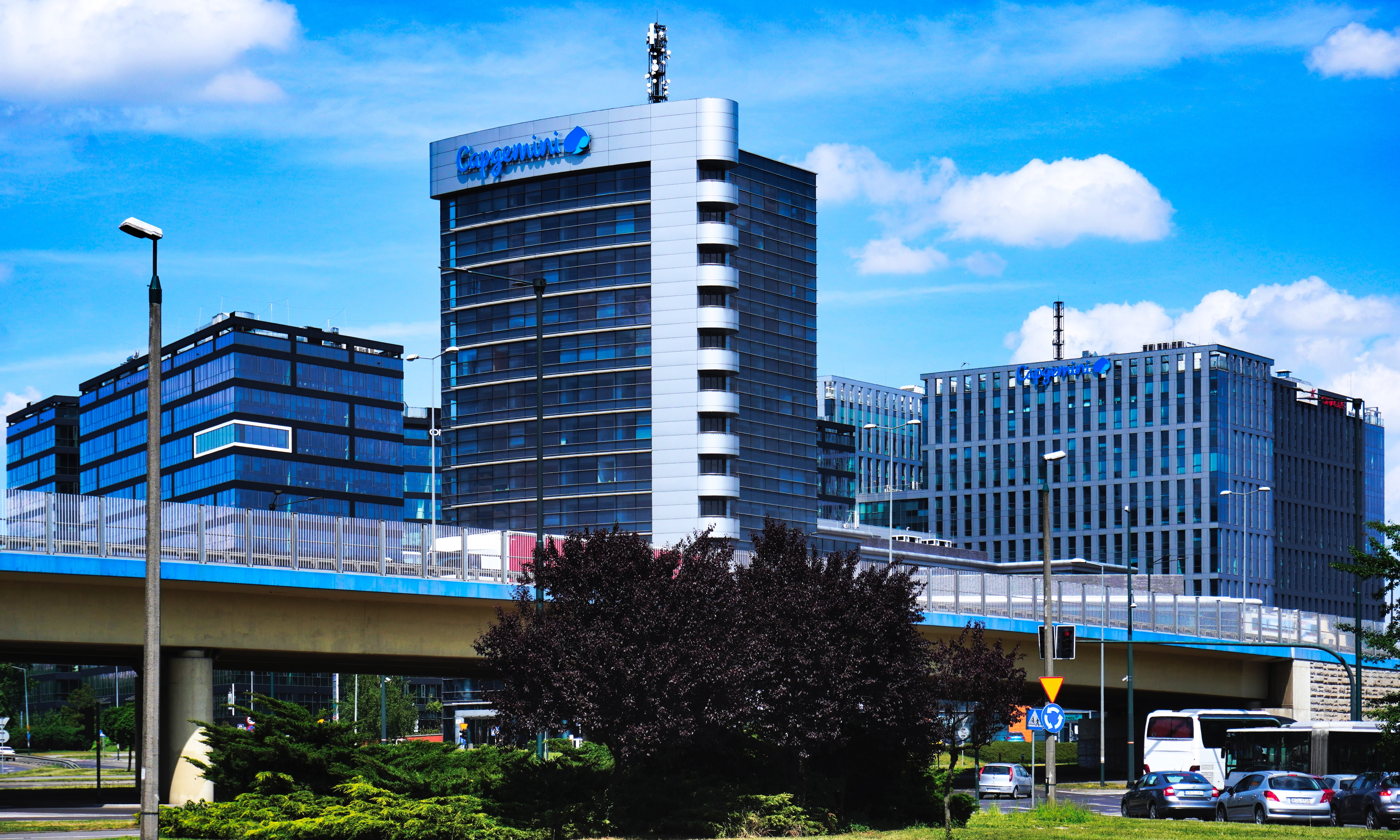
Tertium Business Park, Rondo Business Park and Quarrto Business Park

Prądnik Czerwony ("Red Prądnik") is Kraków's Administrative District No. III. Until 1990 it was a part of District No. I (Stare Miasto). It borders Prądnik Biały to the north-west, Mistrzejowice and Czyżyny to the east, and Stare Miasto and Grzegórzki to the south. It consists of neighbourhoods called Prądnik Czerwony, Olsza (partly in Grzegórzki), Rakowice, Śliczna, Ugorek, Warszawskie (partly in Stare Miasto) and Wieczysta.

== Prądnik Biały ==
Prądnik Biały

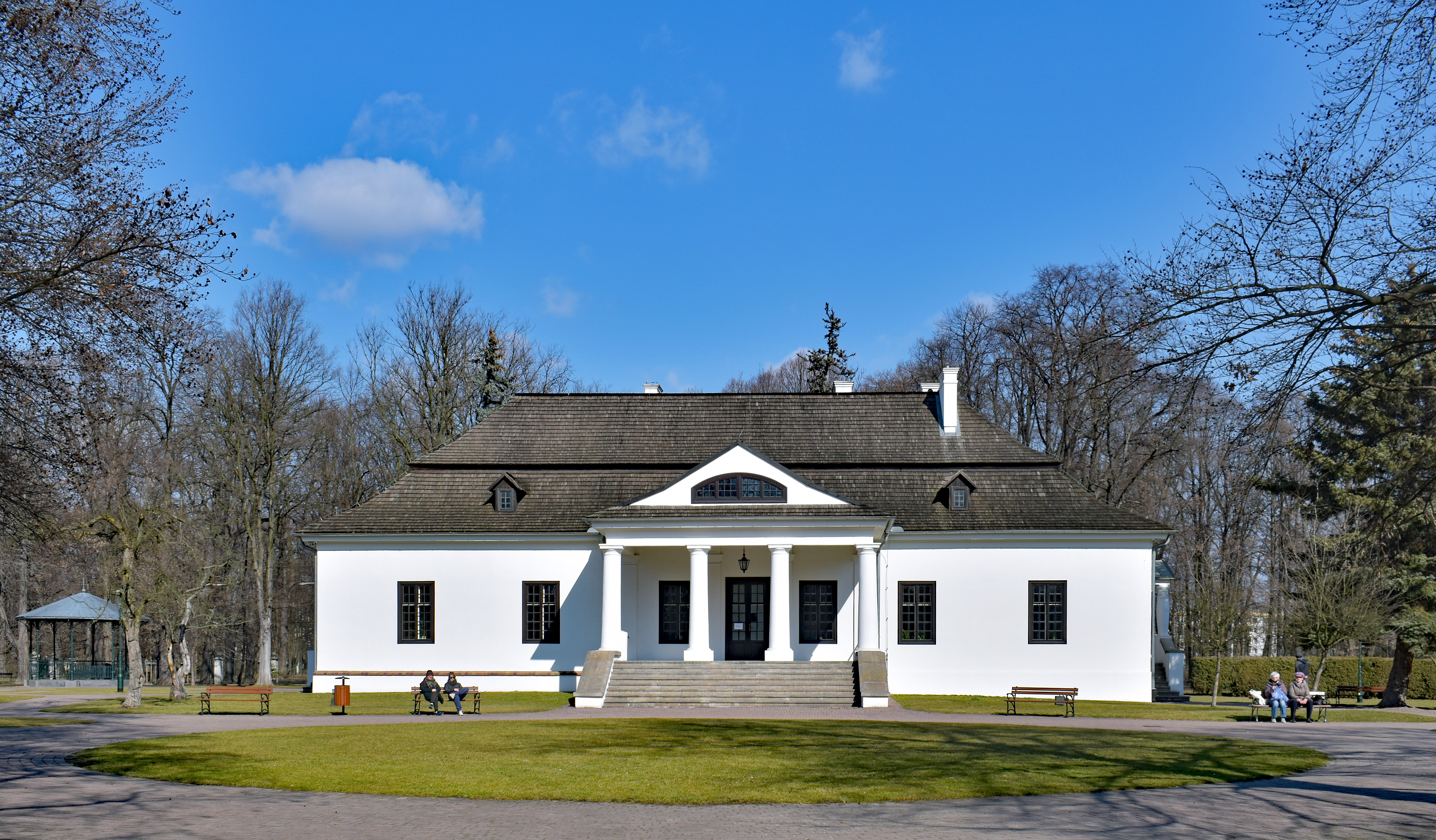
Białoprądnicki manor house

Prądnik Biały ("White Prądnik") is Kraków's Administrative District No. IV, the most northerly district in the city. Until 1990 it was a part of District No. V (Krowodrza). It borders Bronowice, Krowodrza, Stare Miasto and Grzegórzki. It consists of neighbourhoods called Prądnik Biały, Azory, Bronowice Wielkie, Górka Narodowa, Tonie, Witkowice, Żabiniec, Osiedle Krowodrza Górka and Osiedle Witkowice Nowe.

== Krowodrza ==
Krowodrza

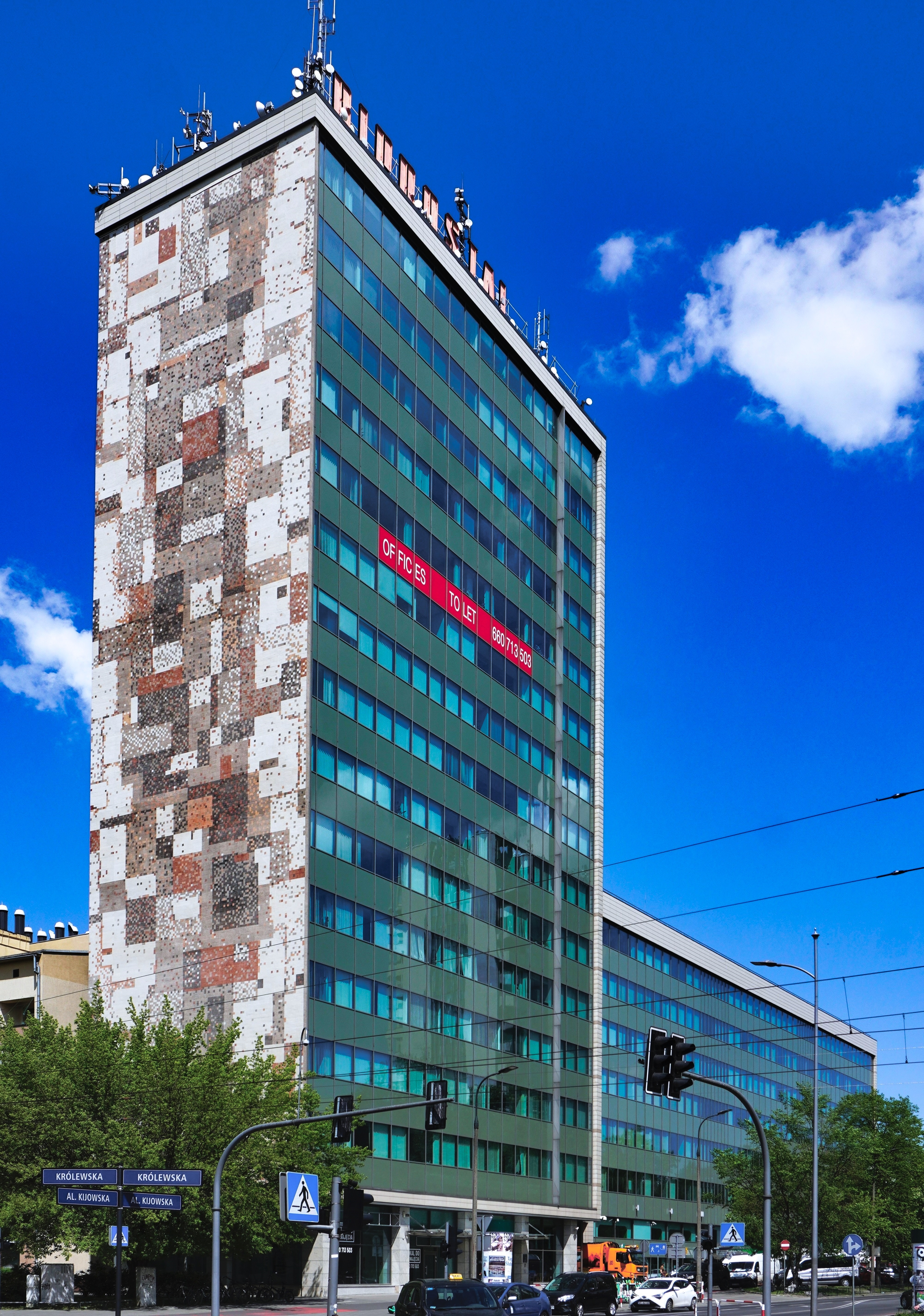
Biprostal tower

Krowodrza is Kraków's Administrative District No. V, until 24 May 2006 known as Łobzów. It borders Stare Miasto to the east, Zwierzyniec to the south, Bronowice to the west and Prądnik Biały to the north. It consists of the former villages of Czarna Wieś, Krowodrza, Łobzów and Nowa Wieś, the Cichy Kącik estate, and a quarter with housing for students of the AGH University of Science and Technology.

== Bronowice ==
Bronowice

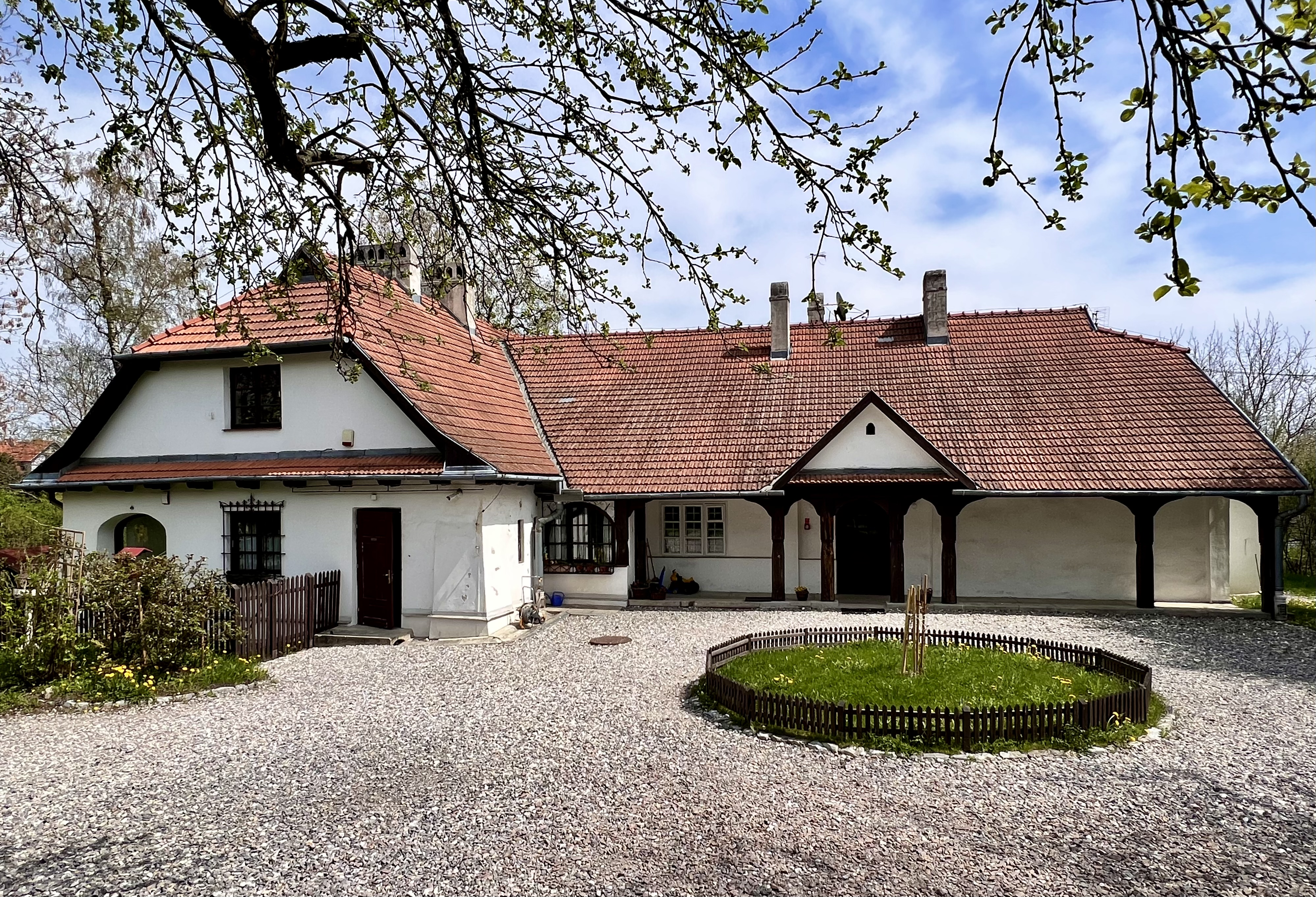
Rydlówka manor house

Bronowice is Kraków's Administrative District No. VI, split in 1990 from District No. V. It is bordered by Prądnik Biały to the north, Krowodrza to the east and Zwierzyniec to the south. It consists of the former villages of Bronowice, Bronowice Małe and Mydlniki, and estates called Osiedle Bronowice Nowe and Osiedle Widok Zarzecze.

== Zwierzyniec ==
Zwierzyniec

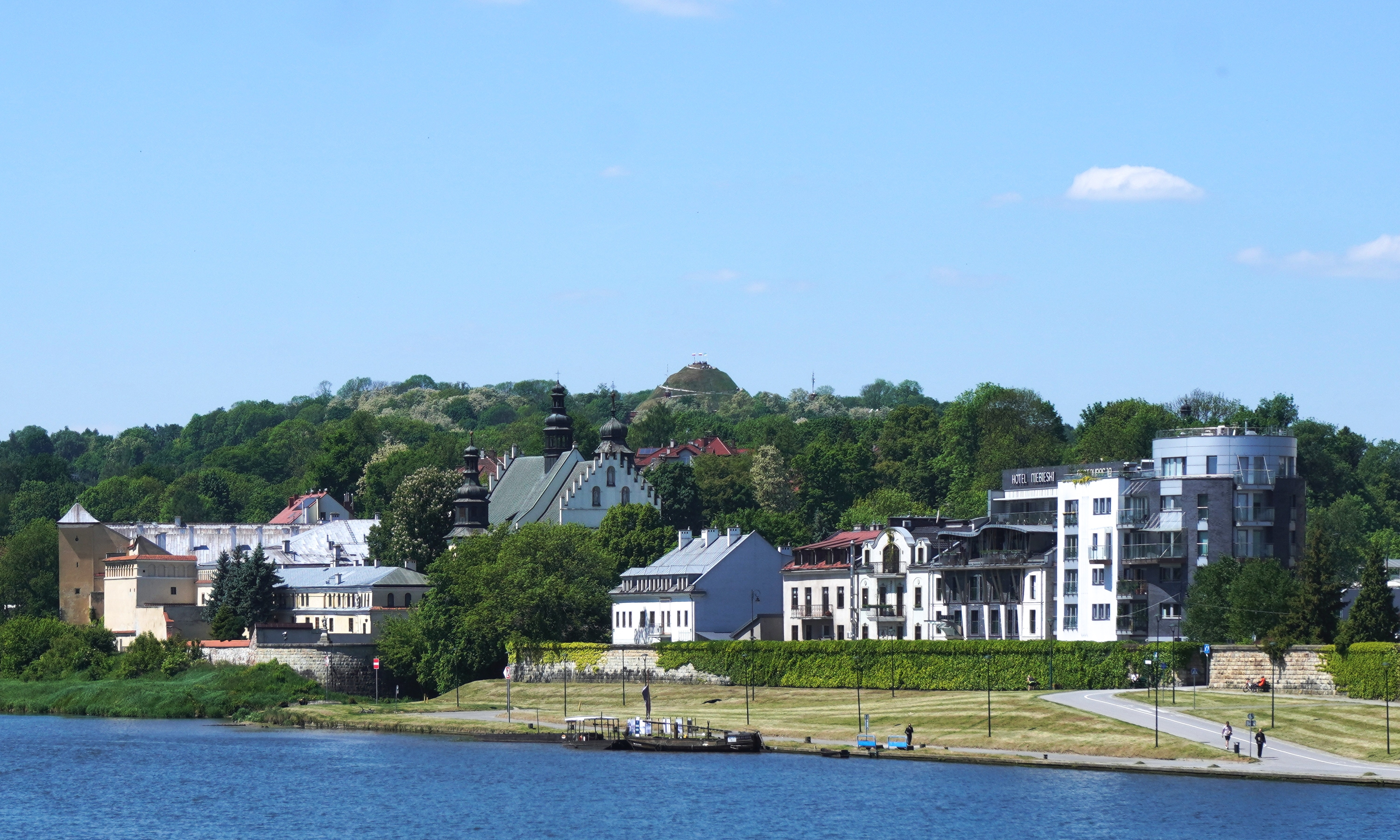
Premonstratensian nuns monastery and the Kosciuszki Mound

Zwierzyniec is Kraków's Administrative District No. VII. It borders Bronowice and Krowodrza to the north, Stare Miasto to the east, and Dębniki to the south (across the Vistula). It includes the neighbourhoods (former villages) of Bielany, Chełm, Olszanica, Półwsie Zwierzynieckie, Przegorzały, Wola Justowska, Zakamycze and Zwierzyniec, and the Salwator estate. The district contains the Kościuszko Mound and the Blessed Bronisława Chapel. In Bielany there is a Camaldolese monastery, with a nature reserve on the slopes of the hill on which it stands. Bielany is also the site of Kraków's first municipal water supply plant, in use since 1901.

== Dębniki ==
Dębniki

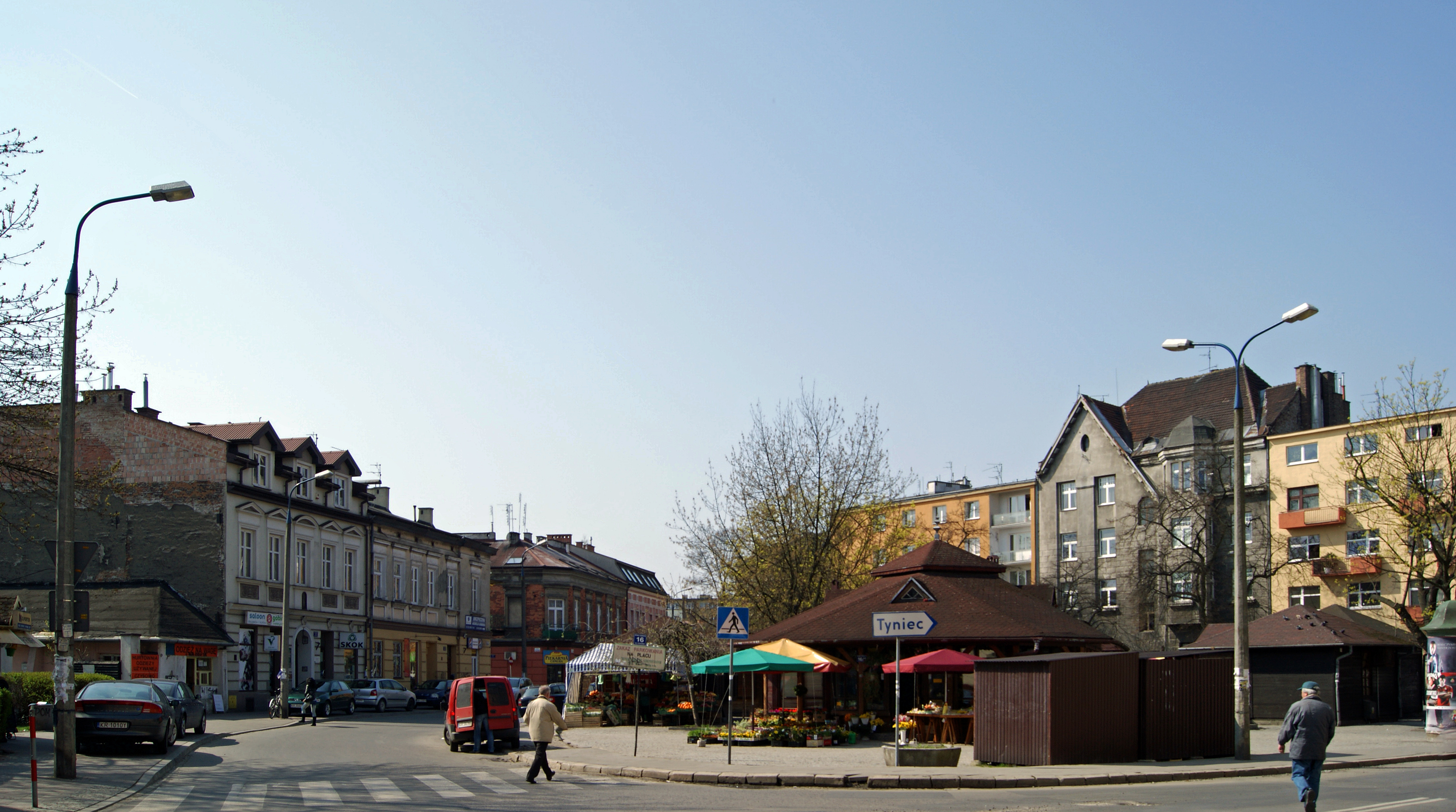
Dębnicki Market Square (Rynek Dębnicki)

Dębniki is Kraków's Administrative District No. VIII, split in 1990 from Podgórze. It contains the former villages of Bodzów, Dębniki, Kapelanka, Kobierzyn, Koło Tynieckie, Kostrze, Ludwinów, Podgórki Tynieckie, Pychowice, Sidzina, Skotniki, Tyniec and Zakrzówek, the neighbourhoods of Kliny Zacisze and Mochnaniec, as well as a number of newly built estates.

Dębniki is a primarily residential area, with diverse architecture, ranging from 19th-century tenements in the area of Rynek Dębnicki (Dębniki Market) to plattenbau blocks of flats in the Podwawelskie and Ruczaj estates and suburban areas of detached houses in the outskirts. In Tyniec is a famous Benedictine abbey, founded in the 11th century.

The district contains many open spaces, Zakrzówek Nature Park being the most popular of them. A new complex of university buildings, called the Third Campus of the Jagiellonian University, is being developed within the district.

== Łagiewniki-Borek Fałęcki ==
Łagiewniki–Borek Fałęcki

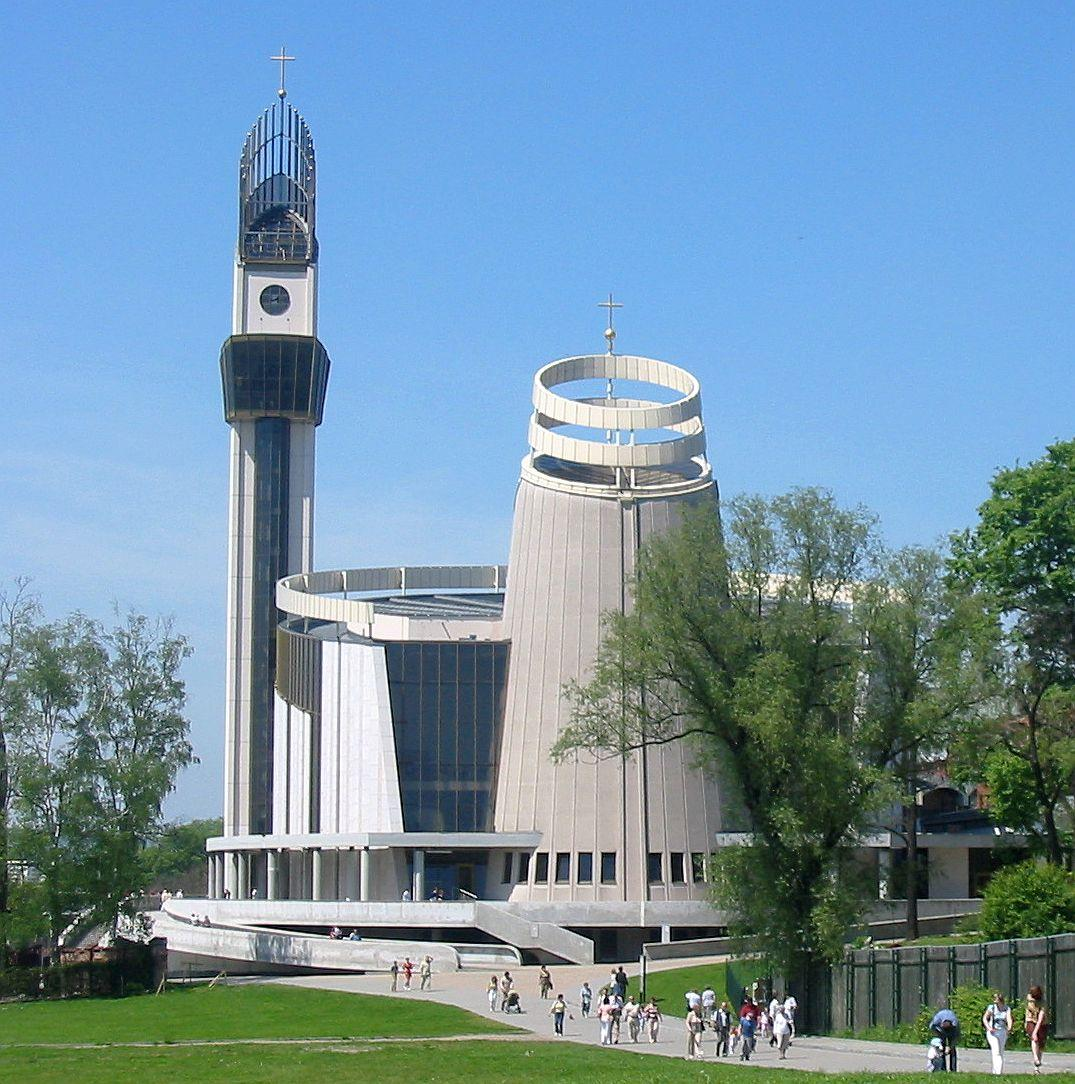
Divine Mercy Sanctuary

Łagiewniki–Borek Fałęcki is Kraków's Administrative District No. IX, also known as District IX Łagiewniki. Until 1990 it was a part of Podgórze district. It consists of the neighbourhood of Łagiewniki to the north, and Borek Fałęcki to the south. In the north-west is the estate called Osiedle Cegielniana. The district borders Podgórze to the north, Podgórze Duchackie to the east, Swoszowice to the south and Dębniki to the west.

== Swoszowice ==
Swoszowice

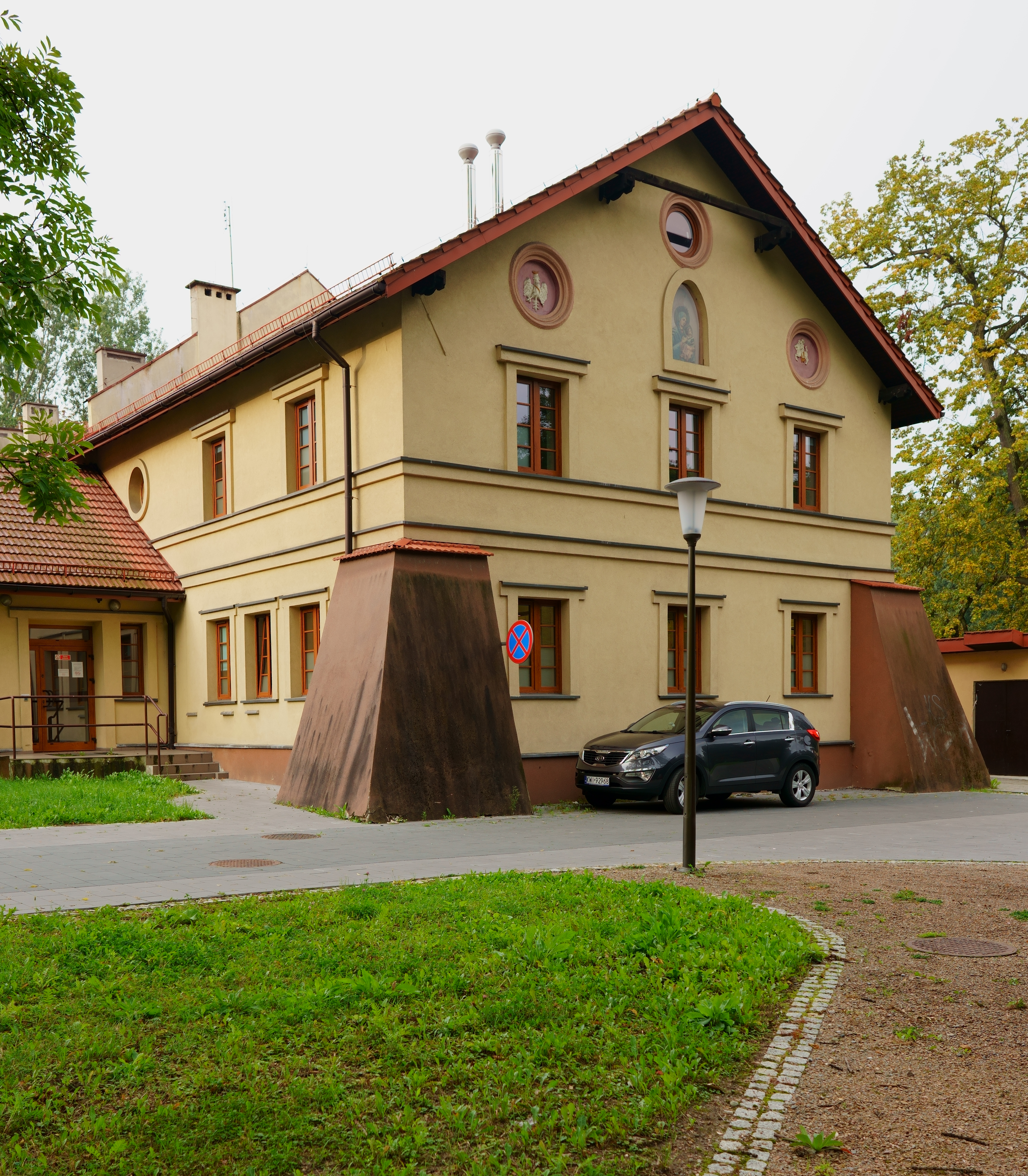
Swoszowice spa

Swoszowice is Kraków's Administrative District No. X. Until 1990 it was a part of Podgórze district. It borders Dębniki to the west and Łagiewniki-Borek Fałęcki and Podgórze Duchackie to the north. It includes the Swoszowice spa neighbourhood, as well as the neighbourhoods of Bania, Barycz, Jugowice, Kliny Borkowskie, Kosocice, Lusina, Łysa Góra ("Bald Mount"), Opatkowice, Rajsko, Siarczana Góra ("Sulphur Mount"), Soboniowice, Wróblowice and Zbydniowice.

== Podgórze Duchackie ==
Podgórze Duchackie

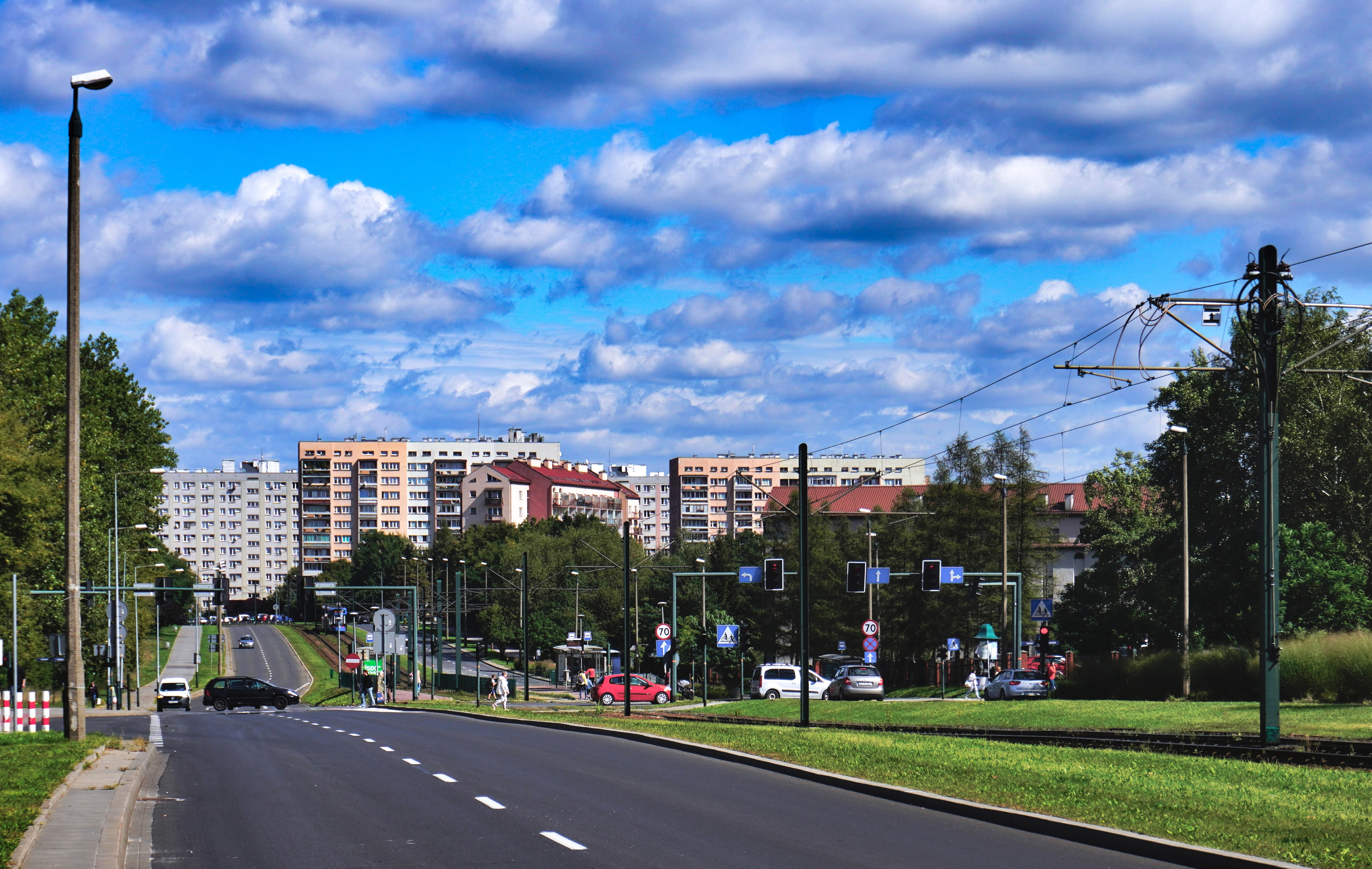
Nowosądecka Street

Podgórze Duchackie is Kraków's Administrative District No. XI. Until 24 May 2006 it was known as District XI Wola Duchacka. It was a part of Podgórze district until 1990. It borders Podgórze to the north, Bieżanów-Prokocim to the east, Swoszowice to the south and Łagiewniki-Borek Fałęcki to the west. The district contains the neighbourhoods of Bonarka, Kurdwanów, Kurdwanów Nowy ("New Kurdwanów"), Osiedle Piaski Nowe, Osiedle Podlesie, Piaski Wielkie and Wola Duchacka.

== Bieżanów-Prokocim ==
Bieżanów-Prokocim

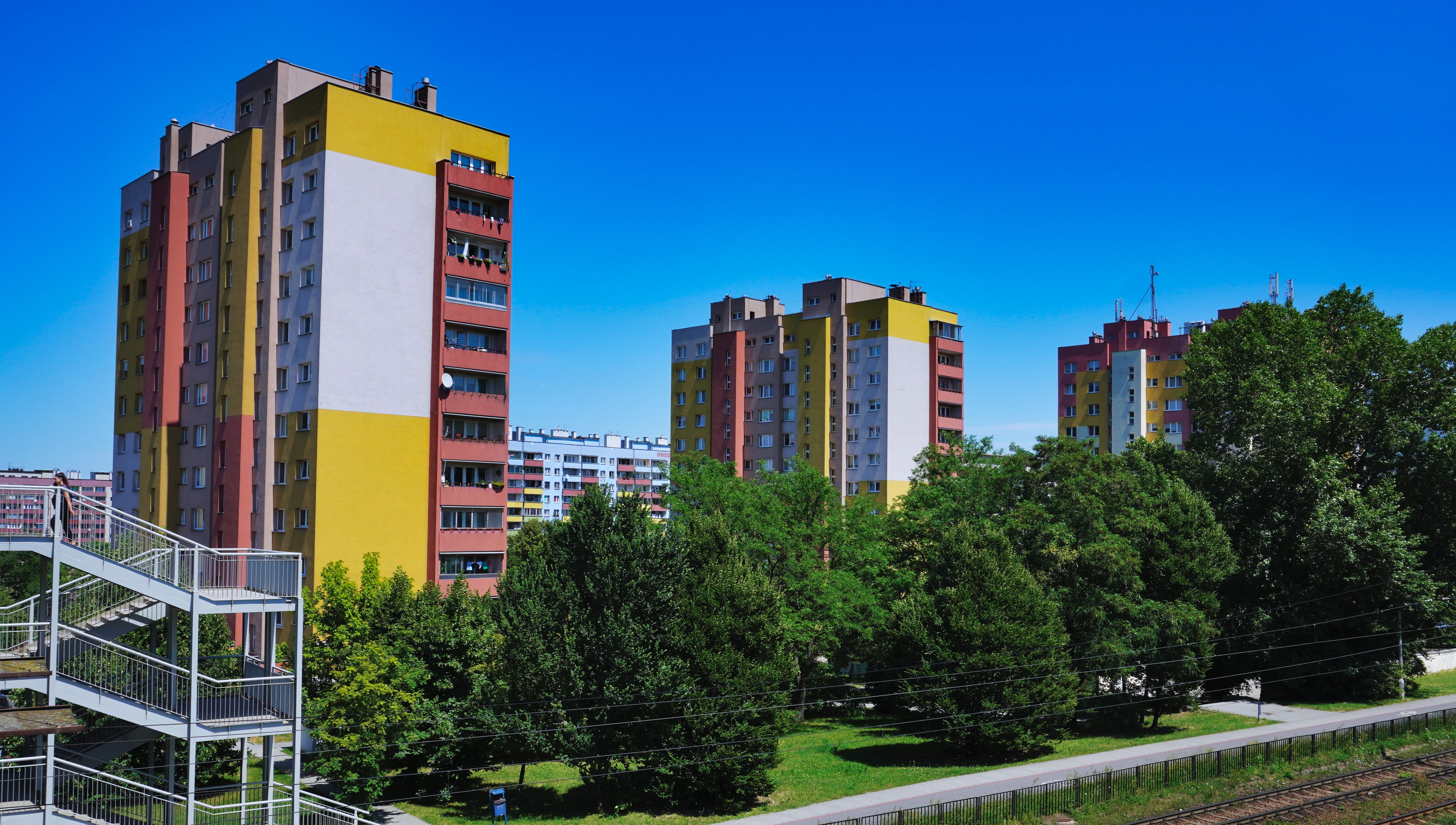
Nowy Prokocim housing estate

Bieżanów-Prokocim is Kraków's Administrative District No. XII. Until 24 May 2006 it was known as District XII Prokocim-Bieżanów; it was a part of Podgórze district until 1990. It borders Podgórze to the north and Podgórze Duchackie to the west. The district takes its name from its constituent neighbourhoods of Bieżanów and Prokocim; it also contains the neighbourhoods of Bieżanów Kolonia, Kaim, Łazy and Rżąka, and a number of residential estates (osiedla): Bieżanów Nowy, Kolejowe, Medyków, Na Kozłówce, Nad Potokiem, Parkowe, Prokocim Nowy and Złocień.

== Podgórze ==
Podgórze

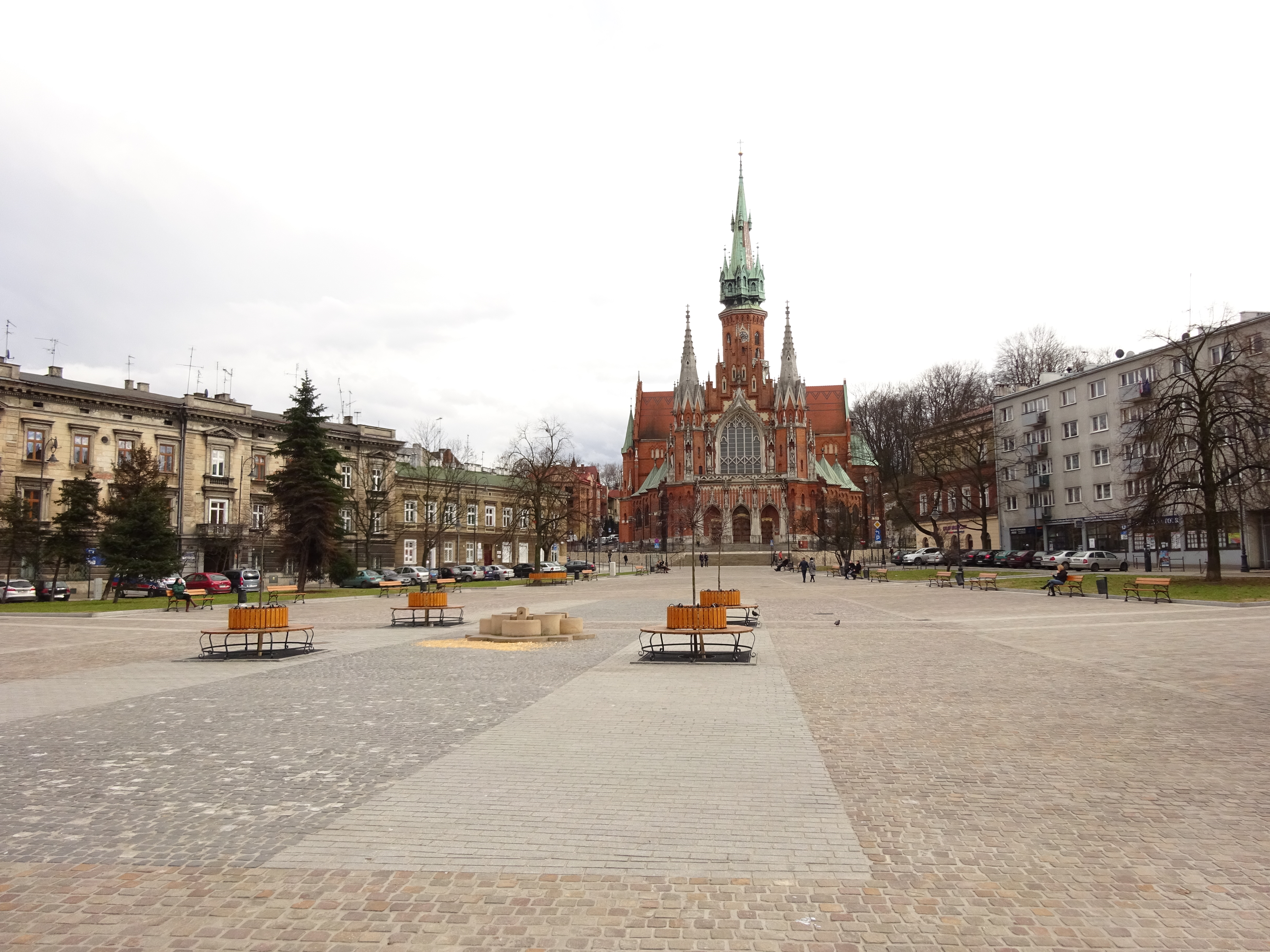
Podgórze Market Square

Podgórze is situated on the right (southern) bank of the Vistula River. Initially a fishing village at the foot of Lasota Hill, it was granted city status by the Austrian Emperor Joseph II in 1784. From 1784 to 1915 it was an independent township; in 1910 Podgórze was the 13th largest town in Galicia. Formerly a residential and light-industry suburb of Kraków, it is now a fully integrated part of the city, not a suburb. Historic Podgórze is also officially part of Kraków's old town or 'stare miasto'. Other neighborhoods include the old villages of Płaszów, Rybitwy and Przewóz. Podgórze's total population is listed at 31,599, within an area of 24.6 km^{2} (as of 31 December 2006).

The oldest man-made structure in Podgórze is the Krakus Mound on Lasota Hill, believed to be the grave of the legendary prince Krakus. Carl's Bridge, linking Podgórze with Kraków proper across the Vistula and located between today's Mostowa and Brodzińskiego streets, was built in 1802 and destroyed by a flood just 11 years later in 1813.

A new pedestrian-and-cyclists-only bridge was completed in the summer of 2010 on the site of the 19th century original.

== Czyżyny ==
Czyżyny

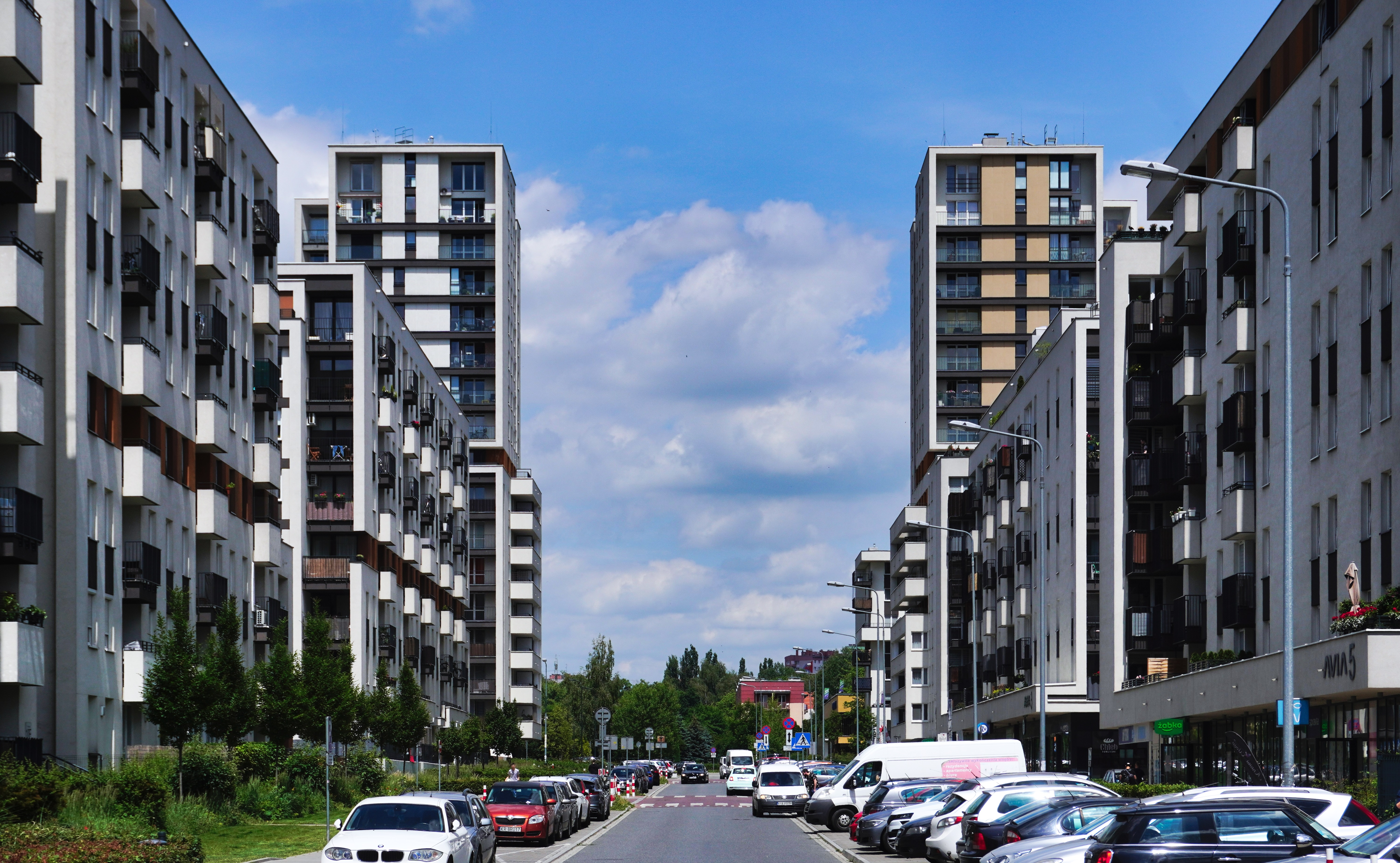
Nowe Czyżyny housing estate

Czyżyny is Kraków's Administrative District No. XIV. It borders Grzegórzki, Prądnik Czerwony, Mistrzejowice, Bieńczyce, Nowa Huta, and (to the south, across the river) Podgórze. Until 1990 it was part of Nowa Huta district. It includes the former village of Czyżyny, as well as the neighbourhood of Łęg and a number of residential estates.

== Mistrzejowice ==
Mistrzejowice

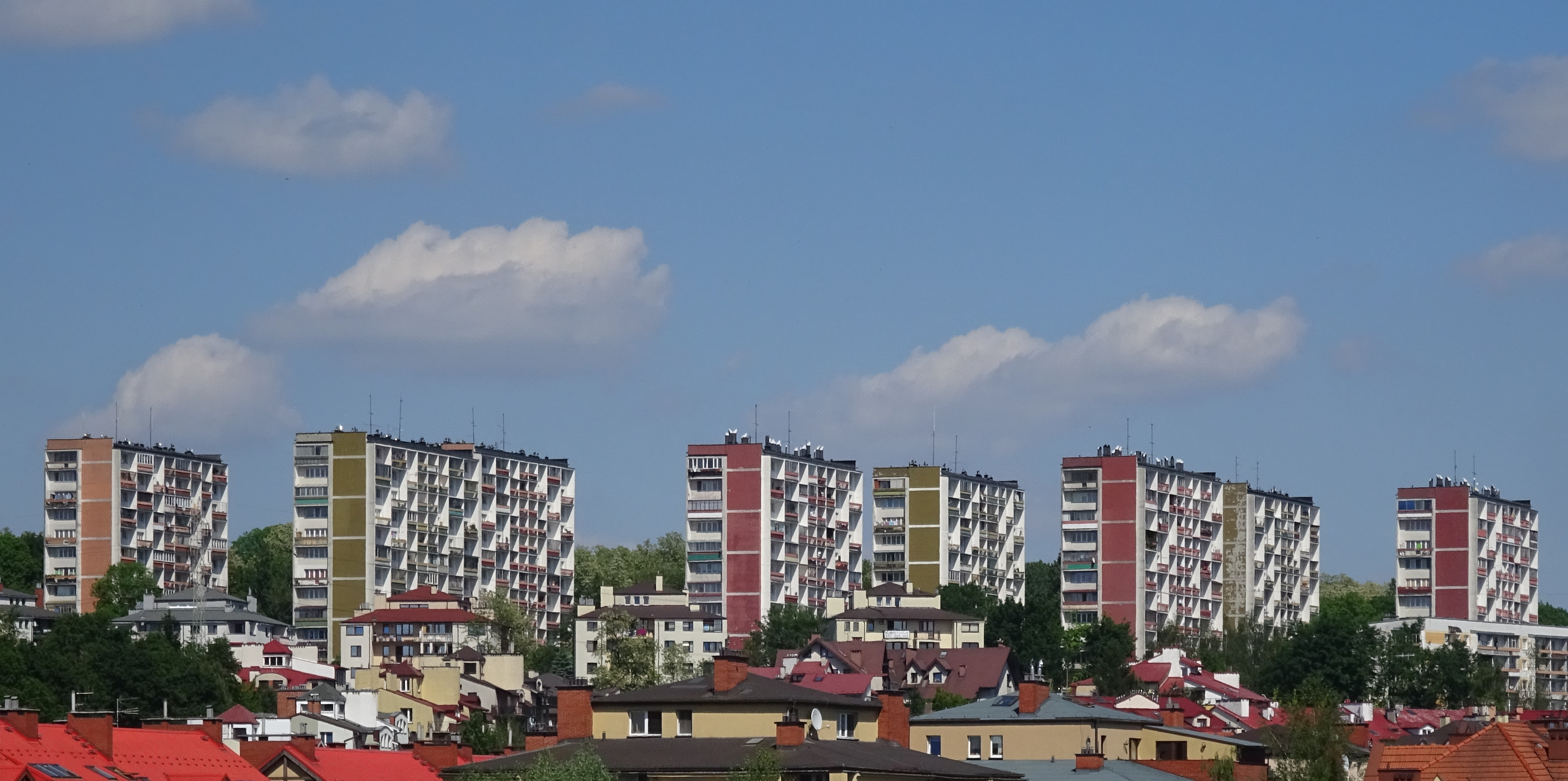
Złotego Wieku housing estate

Mistrzejowice is Kraków's Administrative District No. XV. It borders Prądnik Czerwony, Czyżyny, Bieńczyce and Wzgórza Krzesławickie. It includes the neighbourhoods of Batowice, Dziekanowice and Mistrzejowice, and a number of residential estates.

== Bieńczyce ==
Bieńczyce

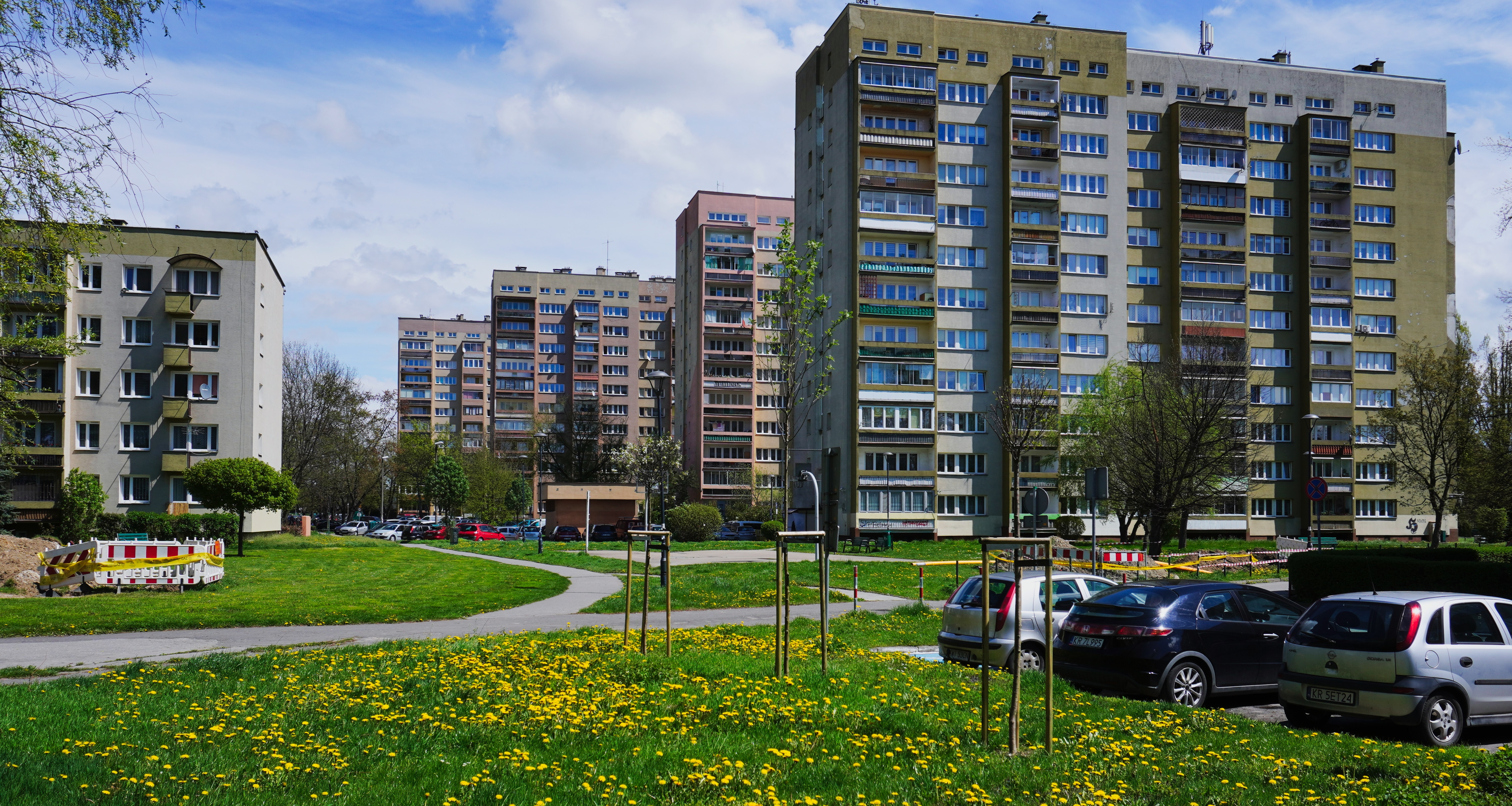
Przy Arce housing estate

Bieńczyce is Kraków's Administrative District No. XVI. It borders Czyżyny to the south-west, Mistrzejowice to the north-west, Wzgórza Krzesławickie, to the north-east, and Nowa Huta to the south-east.

== Wzgórza Krzesławickie ==
Wzgórza Krzesławickie

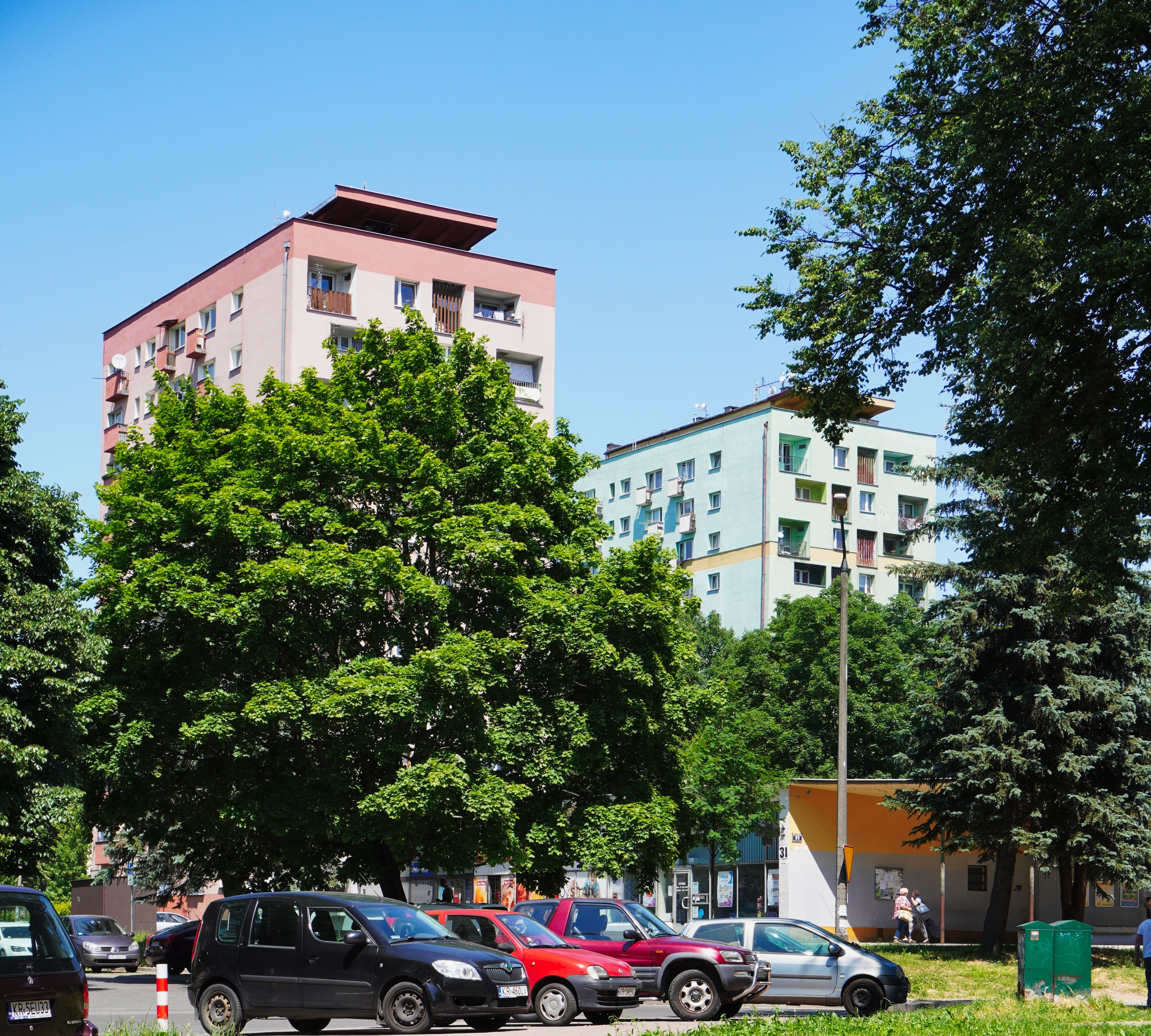
Na Wzgórzach housing estate

Wzgórza Krzesławickie ("Krzesławice Heights") is Kraków's Administrative District No. XVII. Until 24 May 2006 it was known as District XVII Grębałów. It borders Mistrzejowice and Bieńczyce to the west, and Nowa Huta to the south. The district of Wzgórza Krzesławickie comprises the former villages of Dłubnia, Grębałów, Kantorowice, Krzesławice, Lubocza, Łuczanowice, Wadów, Węgrzynowice, and Zesławice.

== Nowa Huta ==
Nowa Huta

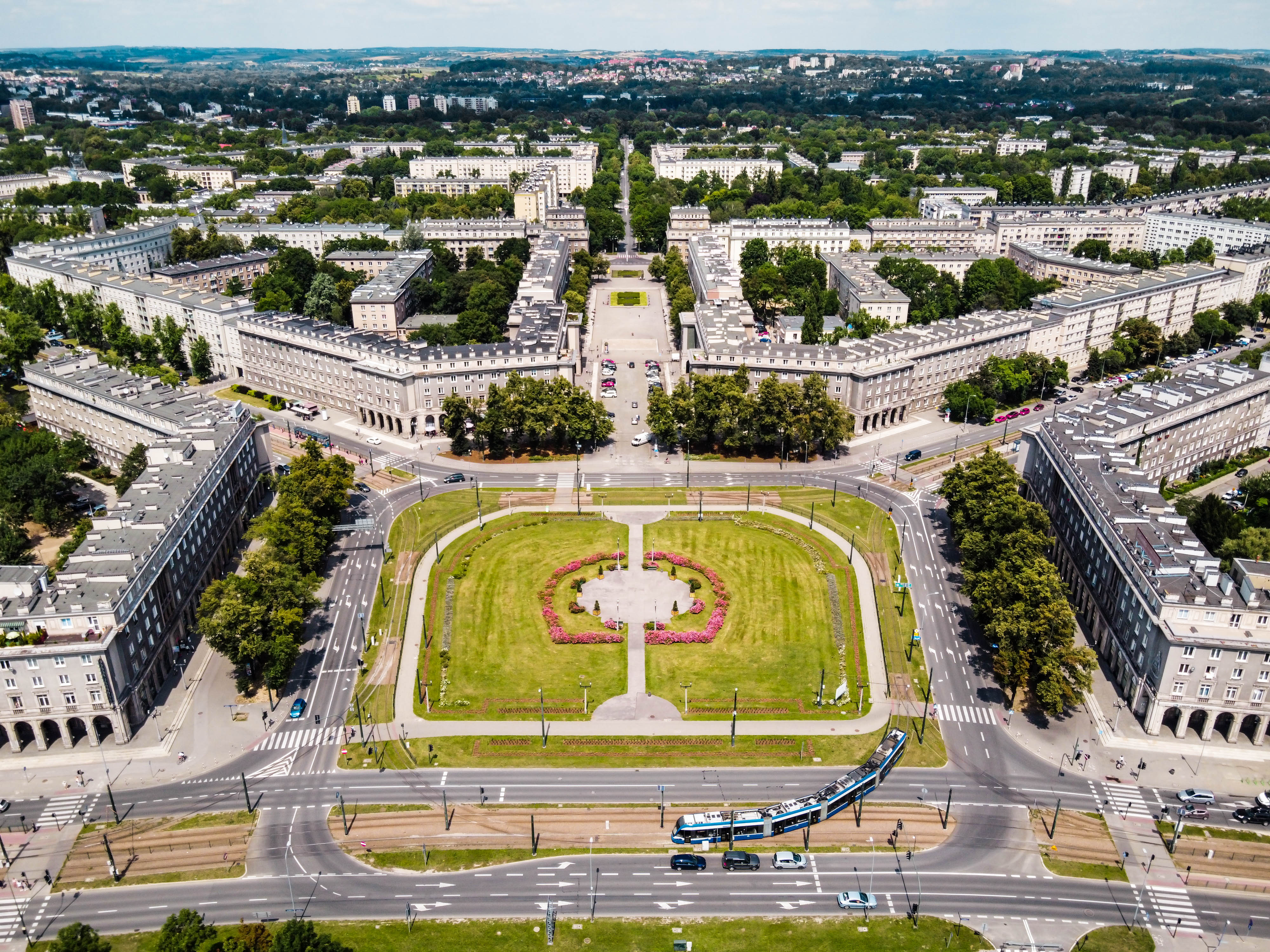
Central Square (Plac Centralny)

Nowa Huta (literally "New Steel Mill") is the easternmost district of Kraków, numbered XVIII. With more than 200,000 inhabitants it is one of the most populous areas of the city.

The historic area of present-day Nowa Huta is one of the few places in Poland settled continuously since the Neolithic period. Archeological research has discovered a big Celtic settlement and Poland's oldest Slavic settlements there. A mound was erected by Vistulans in the 8th century. According to legend, the Wanda Mound is a tomb of Wanda, daughter of Krak, a mythical founder of Kraków. In the 13th century a Cistercian monastery was built in the easternmost village of Mogiła, called the Mogiła Abbey.

Nowa Huta was built from the ground up in 1949 as a separate town near Kraków on terrain resumed by the Communist Government from former villages of Mogiła, Pleszów and Krzesławice. It was planned as a huge centre of heavy industry around the new Lenin Steelworks. The town was to become an ideal town for the communist propaganda and populated mostly by industrial workers (see: Socialist realism in Poland). In 1951 it was joined with Kraków as its new district and the following year tramway communication was started.

Since the fall of Communism the city district that was once a showpiece for Stalinism now boasts many tributes to ardent anti-Communism. Streets formerly named after Lenin and the Cuban Revolution have been renamed to honor Pope John Paul II and the Polish exile leader Władysław Anders. In 2004 Plac Centralny, Nowa Huta's central square which once was home to a giant statue of Lenin - on display at High Chaparral Museum in Hillerstorp Sweden, was renamed Ronald Reagan Central Square (Plac Centralny im. Ronalda Reagana) in honor of the former U.S. President. However, this decision led to many protests, and the traditional name is still widely used.

== See also ==
- John Paul II Cathedral Museum
- Kraków Society of Friends of Fine Arts
- Wawel Cathedral
- Wawel Royal Castle National Art Collection
