= Wola Justowska =

Area in Kraków, Poland

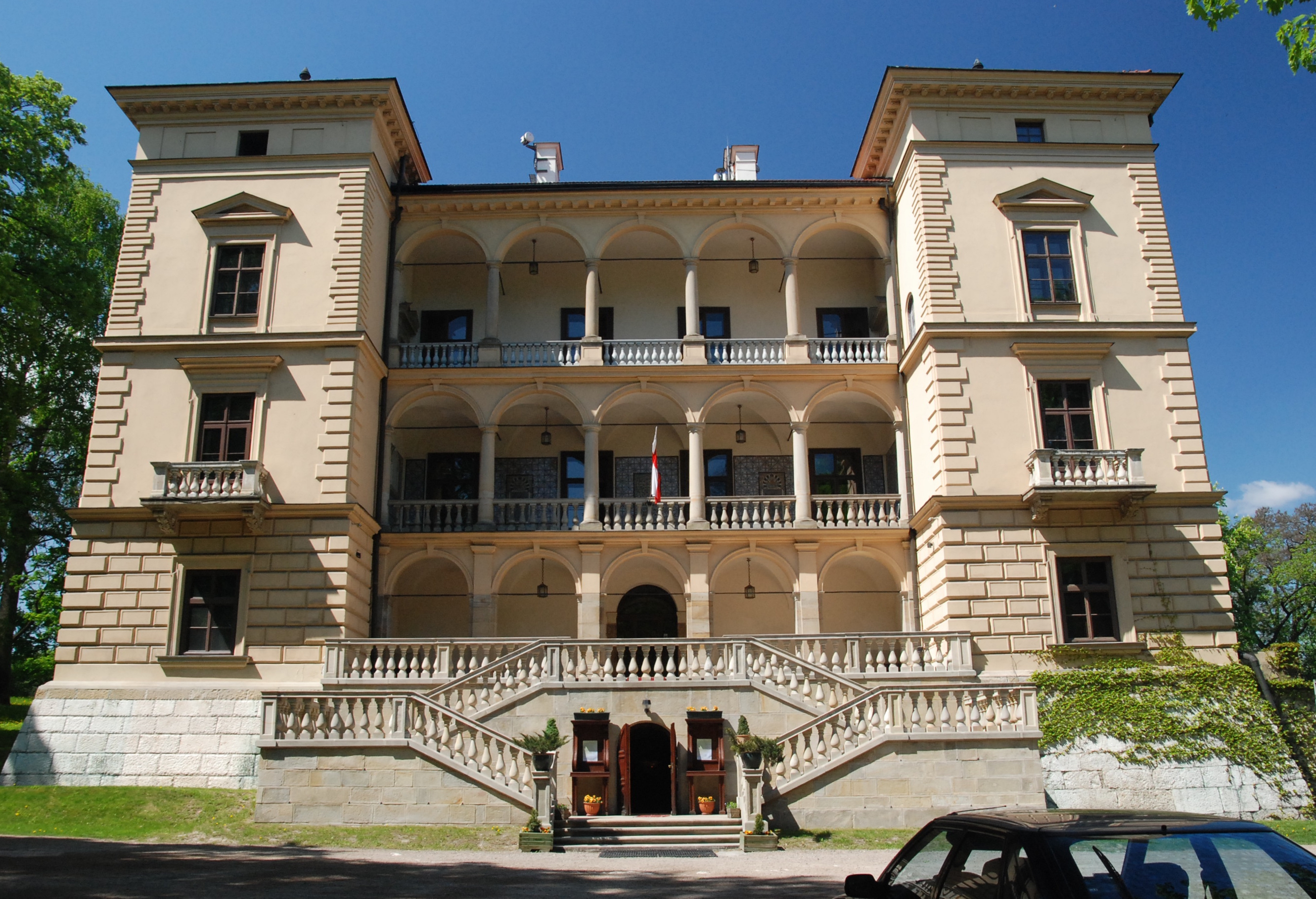
Decjusz Manor at Wola Justowska

Wola Justowska is an area belonging to Zwierzyniec District Nº. VII of Kraków, Poland. It was previously a village known as Wola Chełmska until the 16th century. It became part of metropolitan Kraków in 1941.

== See also ==
- Districts of Kraków
