= Royal Garden in Kraków =

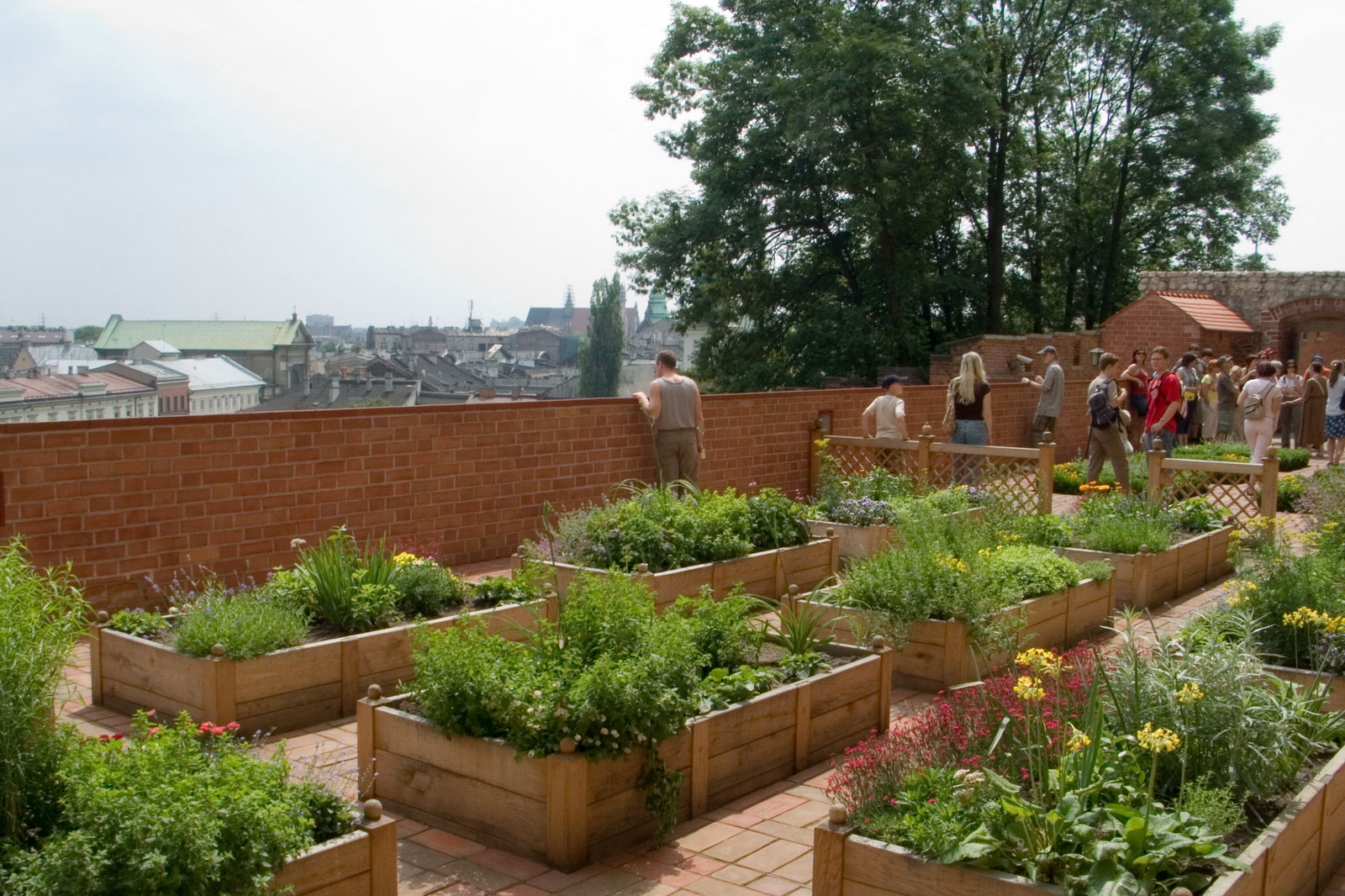
- Interactive map of Royal Garden in Kraków
- Location: Kraków, Poland
- Coordinates: 50.0545°N 19.9376°E

Ogrody Królewskie na Wawelu is a botanical garden and museum in Kraków, Poland.
