= Wawel Dragon =

Creature in Polish folklore

Smok Wawelski
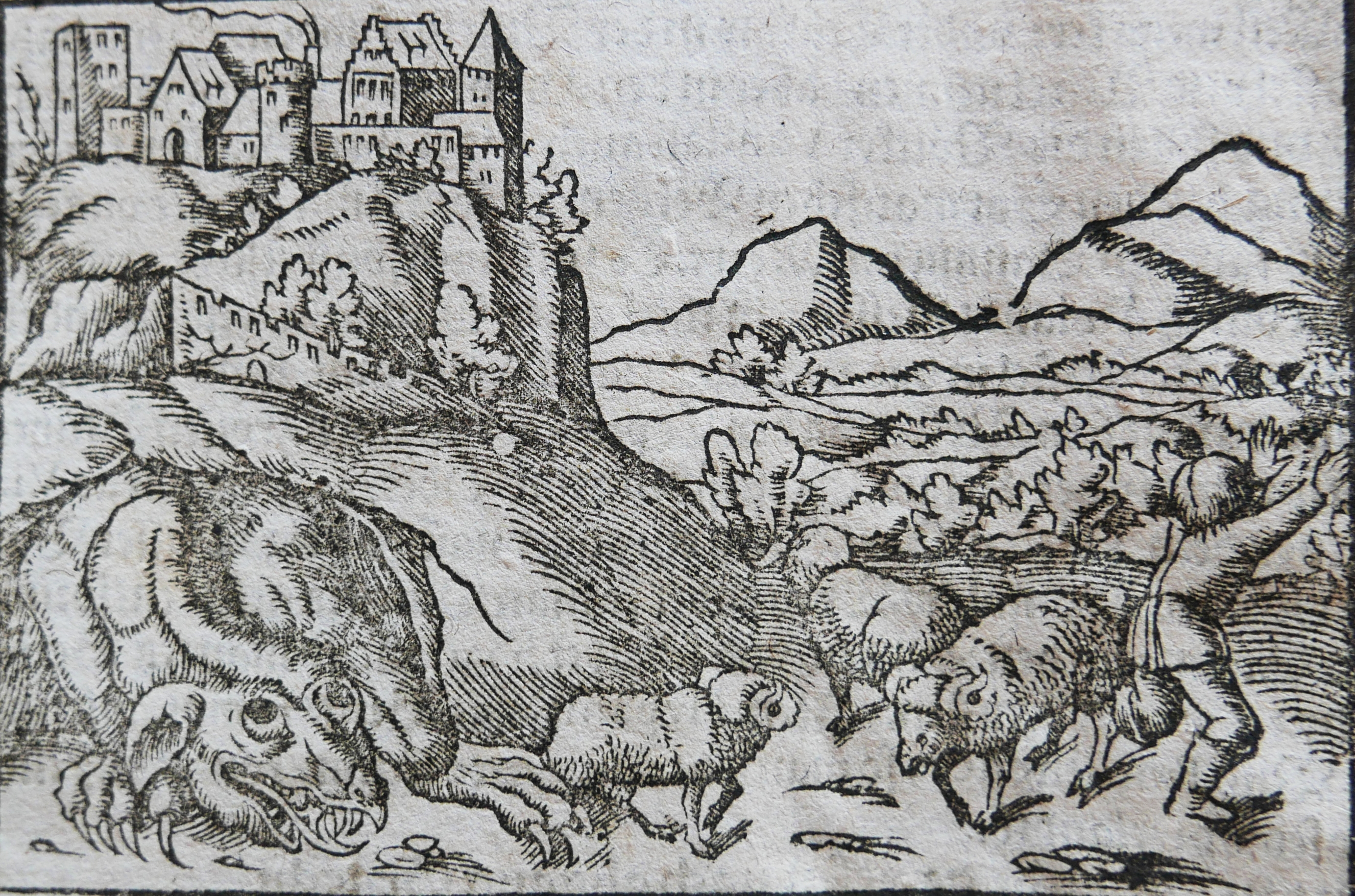
- The Wawel Dragon, in Sebastian Münster's Cosmographia Universalis (1544)

The Wawel Dragon (Polish: Smok Wawelski), also known as the Dragon of Wawel Hill, is a famous dragon in Polish legend.

According to the earliest account (13th century), a dragon (holophagos, "one who swallows whole") plagued the capital city of Kraków established by legendary King Krak (or Krakus, Gracchus, etc.). The man-eating monster was being appeased with a weekly ration of cattle, until finally being defeated by the king's sons using decoy cows stuffed with sulfur. But the younger prince ("Krak the younger" or "Krak junior") murdered his elder brother to take sole credit, and was banished afterwards. Consequently Princess Wanda had to succeed the kingdom. Later in a 15th-century chronicle, the prince-names were swapped, with the elder as "Krak junior" and the younger as Lech. It also credited the king himself with masterminding the carcasses full of sulfur and other reagents. A yet later chronicler (Marcin Bielski, 1597) credited the stratagem to a cobbler named Skub (Skuba), adding that the "Dragon's Cave" (Polish: Smocza Jama) lay beneath Wawel Castle (on Wawel Hill on the bank of the Vistula River).

== Literary history ==
The oldest known telling of the story comes from the 13th-century work attributed to Bishop of Kraków and historian of Poland, Wincenty Kadłubek.

=== Polish Chronicle (13th c.) ===
According to Wincenty Kadłubek's Polish Chronicle, a dragon appeared during the reign of King Krak (Latin: Grakchus, recté Gracchus).

St. Wincenty's original Latin text actually refers to the dragon as holophagus' (Polish gloss: całożerca, wszystkożerca; "one who swallows whole"), which was a neologism he had coined. In Polish translation of the work, the monster is rendered as the "greedily swallowing dragon" (Polish: chciwie połykał smok).

It was a "terrible and cruel beast" dwelling "in the depths [windings/curves] of a certain rock (scopulus)" or emended to "a certain cave (spelunca)" according to Wincenty. (Note: Ćwikliński ed. (1878), p. 607, Chronicon Polono-Silesiacum (c. 1895) appends spelunca (cave) in parentheses, calling the beast olofagus [sic.]: "Erat enim in cuiusdam spelunce scopuli anfractibus monstrum atrocitatis immanissime, quod quidam olofagum dicunt".)

The dragon required a weekly offering of cattle, or else humans would have been devoured instead. In the hope of killing the dragon, Krak called upon his two sons (Note: Wincenty only names the younger son as "the younger Krakus".). They could not, however, defeat the creature by hand, so they came up with a trick. They fed him a cattle skin stuffed with smoldering sulfur, causing his fiery death. After the success, the younger prince (referred to as the "junior Gracchus"; Latin: iunior Gracchus var. minor Gracchus, i.e. Krak II; Polish: młodsy Grakus) kills his elder brother blaming the dragon for the death. But his crime was soon revealed, and he got expelled from the country. Afterwards Princess Wanda had to accede to the kingship.

=== Derivative chronicles ===
Among later chronicles derived from Wincenty Kadłubek's work, Chronicle of Greater Poland (<1296) (Note: Possibly attributable to Janko z Czarnkowa (ca. 1320–1387)) fails to make mention of the dragon at all, while the Dzierzwa Chronicle (or Mierzwa Chronicle; Kronika Dzierzwy/Kronika Mierzwy, 14th century) followed closely after Wincenty. Both these chronicles maintain that Krak, Jr. is the younger prince, and keep the elder brother nameless.

Jan Długosz's 15th-century chronicle, however, swapped the roles of the princes, claiming that the younger son named Lech was the killer, while the elder son named Krak, Jr. became the victim. The idea for the scheme to slay the dragon (olophagus) is credited to King Krak himself, not his sons, because the king fears a mass exodus from the city may take place, and he orders to have the carcass stuffed with flammable substances, namely sulfur, tinder (Polish: próchno; Latin: cauma (Note: A scholium on a 16th cent. manuscript glosses cauma as "fomes", "zagyew".)), wax, pitch, and tar and set them on fire. The dragon ate the burning meal and died breathing fire just before death. Długosz also adds the detail that the dragon lived in a cave of Mount Wawel upon which King Krak had built his castle. (Note: And exactly 3 beasts per day (tria singulis diebus belluae iactantur) needed to be delivered to the dragon according to Długosz.) In any case, the fratricide is banished, so their sister Princess Wanda must accede to the throne.

== Shoemaker version ==
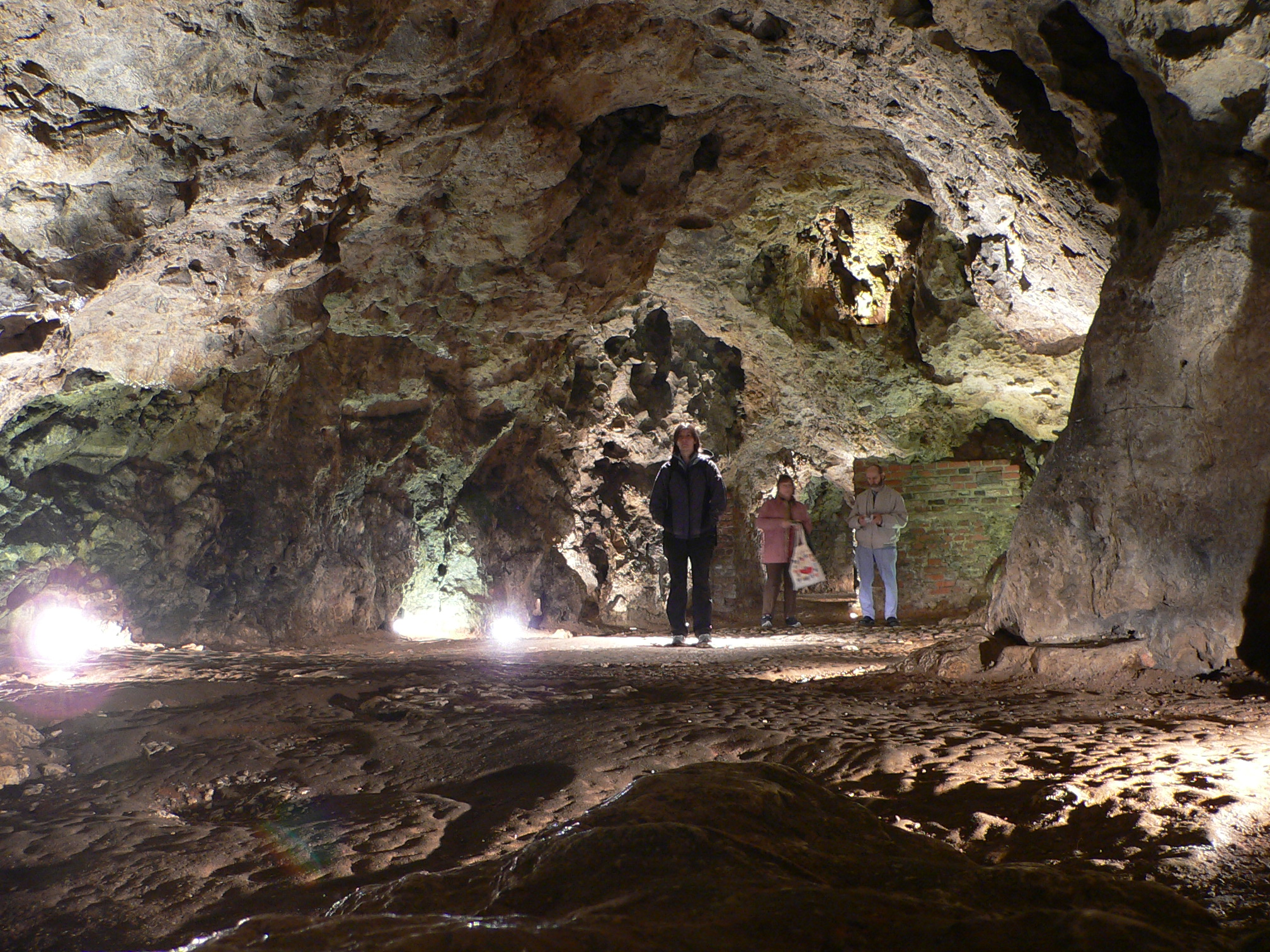
The Dragon's Cave

Later, Marcin Bielski's Kronika Polska (1597) (Note: This is posthumous publication; the revisions to the Wawel dragon story are actually attributed to his son Joachim Bielski.) gave credit to Skub or Skuba the Cobbler (Skuba Szewca) (Note: The actual name is Skub (genitive Skuba) in the original writing, but later writers altered it to Skuba (genitive Skuby).) for designing the plan to defeat the dragon. (Note: The inspiration for the name of Skuba was probably a church of St. Jacob (pol. Kuba), which was situated near the Wawel Castle. In one of the hagiographic stories about St. Jacob, he defeats a fire-breathing dragon.) The story still takes place in Kraków during the reign of King Krak, the city's legendary founder, who is here called "Krok". The dragon required a diet of three calves (cielęta) or rams (barany), something in threes, and would snatch people to sate his hunger. On Skub's advice, King Krok had a calf's skin filled with sulfur, used as bait to the dragon. The dragon was unable to swallow this, and drank water until it died. Afterwards, the shoemaker was rewarded handsomely. (Note: Polish: "Kazał tedy Krok nadziać skorę cielecą, siarką a przeciw iamie położyć rano: co uczynił za radą Skuba Szewca nieiakiego, ktorego potym dobrze udárowal y opatrzył"". King executed the plan, and Skub the Cobbler was rewarded (underlined portion).) Bielski adds, "One can still see his cave under the castle. It is called the Dragon's Cave (Smocza Jama)". (Note: Polish: "Jest ieszcze jego iama pod zamkiem, zowią Smoczą iamą", end of quote, Plezia (1972), p. 24. Photo of the cave appears on Fig. 6.)

=== Popular retellings ===
The most popular, fairytale version of the Wawel Dragon tale takes place in Kraków during the reign of King Krakus, the city's legendary founder. Each day the evil dragon would beat a path of destruction across the countryside, killing the civilians, pillaging their homes, and devouring their livestock. In many versions of the story, the dragon especially enjoyed eating young maidens. Great warriors from near and far fought for the prize and failed. A cobbler's apprentice (named Skuba) accepted the challenge. He stuffed a lamb with sulphur and set it outside the dragon's cave. The dragon ate it and became so thirsty, it turned to the Vistula River and drank until it burst. The cobbler married the King's daughter as promised, and founded the city of Kraków.

==== Dratewka ====
It has also been claimed that the name of the shoemaker is Dratewka in children's literature or storytelling about the Krak legend. However, "Shoemaker Dratewka" (Polish: Szewczyk Dratewka) or the "Twine the Shoemaker" (Note: Glossed as the diminutive of dratwa 'twine"; dratewka a 'small, thin shoestring [Schuh-Drath, Schuhdrat] '.) is the name of the smok-slaying protagonist in Maria Kownacka's play O straszliwym smoku i dzielnym szewczyku, prześlicznej królewnie i królu Gwoździku ("The terrible Dragon, the brave Shoemaker, the beautiful Princess and King Gwoździk", 1935). The hero of the same name (Szewczyk Dratewka) also appears in fairy tales by Janina Porazińska.

== Origin theories ==
Parallels

Legends of the Wawel dragon have similarities with the biblical story about Daniel and the Babylonian dragon, and in fact, it was stated in the tract from the Dzierzwa/Mierzwa Chronicle that "Krak[us]'s sons killed the local dragon, like Daniel killed the dragon of Babylon".

The tale of Alexander the Great's dragon-slaying using sulfur in the Romances on King Alexander (which episode only survived in the Syriac version, 7th century), bear an even closer resemblance. (Note: Comparison is also made to the account in Qazwini that Alexander's dragon-slaying was rewarded with gifts such as the horned hare, al-Mi'raj. Hasluck (op. cit.) draws additional parallel with the story of Isfandiyar's dragon-slaying in the Shahnāma, though this is only "somewhat similar stratagem" as it involves daggers rather than sulfur.)

Ancient myth

The legend of the Kraków dragon may well have ancient, pre-Christian origins. An allusion to the practice of Human sacrifice as part of an older, unknown myth has been suggested by historian Maciej Miezian. Or perhaps an Indo-European myth of good vs. evil may underlie the legend. The Kraków Dragon may well be interpreted as a symbol of evil has been commented by others

Historical bases

There might also be some echoes of historical events. According to some historians, the dragon is a symbol of the presence of the Avars on Wawel Hill in the second half of the sixth century, and the victims devoured by the beast symbolize the tribute levied by them. The dragon may have represented the historical Bolesław II who was responsible for the martyrdom of St. Stanislaus of Szczepanów, bishop of Kraków, according to historian Czesław Deptuła.

These ideas combined (the mythos may have been overlaid with a historical allegory) has also been described. The legend may be based on an Indo-European ur-myth about a thunder deity vanquishing a great serpent, and the serpent myth was possibly conflated with the cult of St. Stanislaus.

== Monuments ==
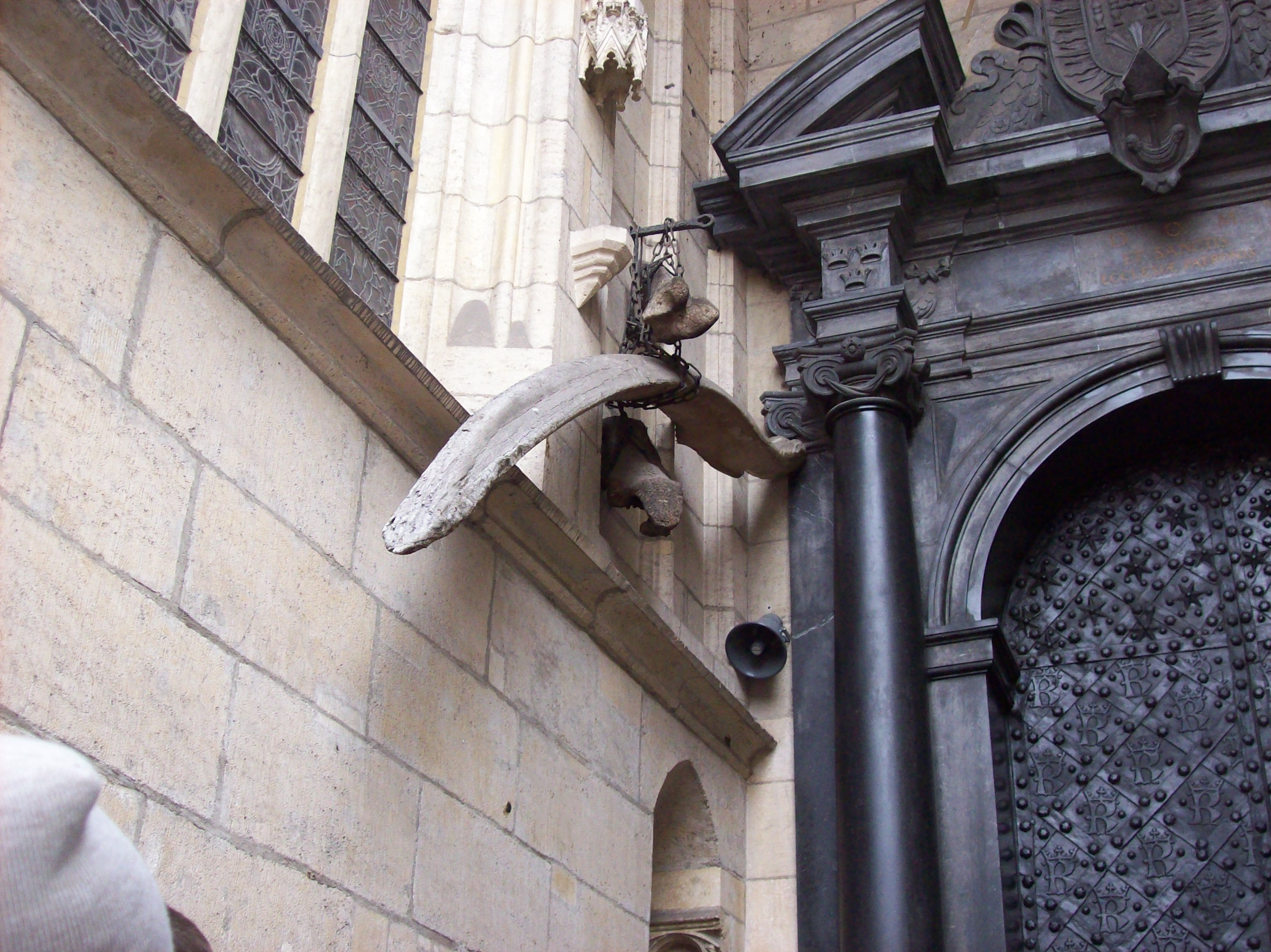
A purported dragon bone hanging outside of Wawel Cathedral

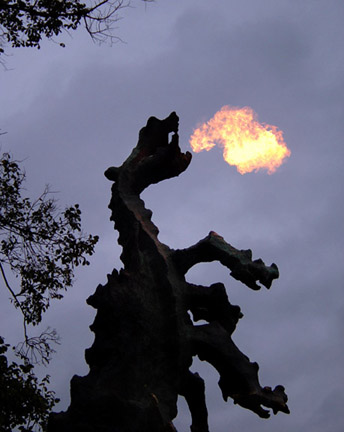
Wawel Dragon sculpture by Bronisław Chromy

The Wawel dragon's supposed Dragon's Cave (Smocza Jama) below Wawel Castle still exists, on the property on the edge of the Vistula River, and can be visited. This particular cave was purportedly first described c. 1190, i.e., in the first account of the legend by Wincenty, though the chronicler merely stated that the beast resided in a "winding of a rock (scopulus anfractibus)", i.e. " a cave (spelunca)".

A metal sculpture of the Wawel Dragon, designed in 1969 by Bronisław Chromy, was placed in front of the Dragon's Cave (Dragon's Den) in 1972. The dragon has seven heads, but frequently people think that it has one head and six forelegs. To the amusement of onlookers, it noisily breathes fire every few minutes, thanks to a natural gas nozzle installed in the sculpture's mouth.

The Wawel Cathedral features a plaque commemorating the dragon's defeat by Krakus, a Polish prince who, according to the plaque, founded the city and built his palace over the slain dragon's cave.

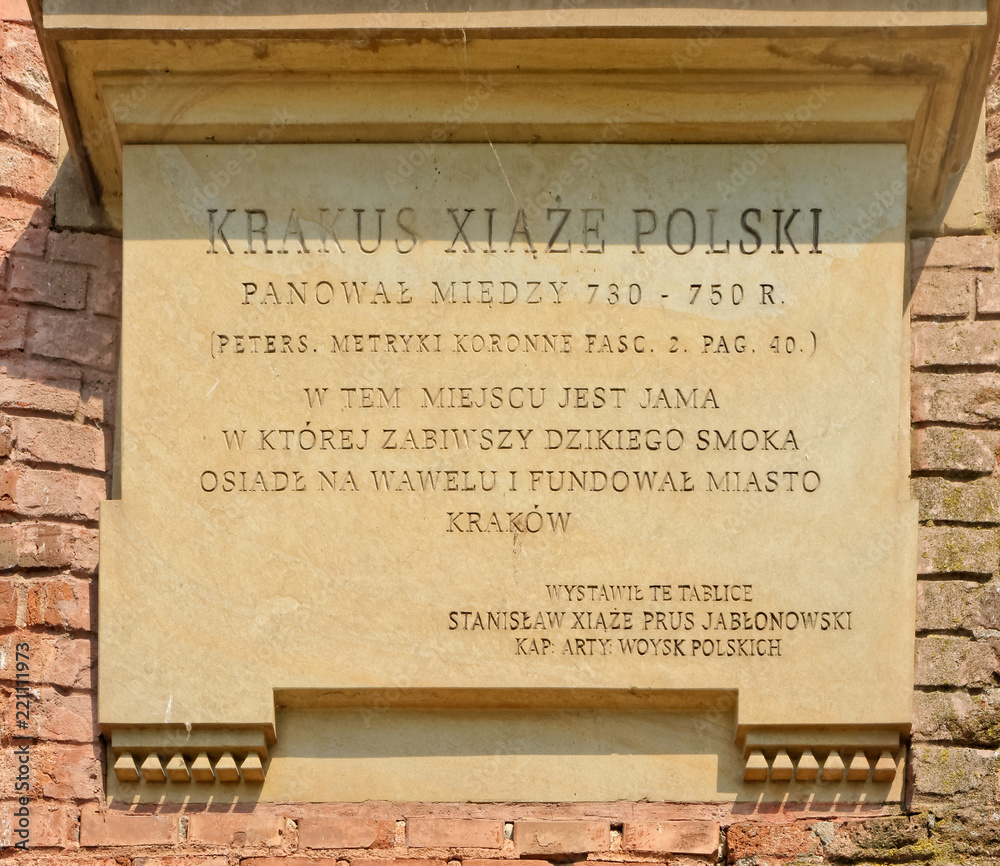
A commemorative plaque on the Wawel royal cathedral. Translation: "Krakus, Duke of Poland. He ruled between 730-750. This place is the burrow in which he killed the wild dragon. He has settled in Wawel Castle and founded the city of Krakow."

In front of the entrance to the cathedral, there are bones of whales or Pleistocene creatures hanging on a chain, which were found and carried to the cathedral in medieval times as the remains of a dragon. It is believed that the world will come to its end when the bones will fall on the ground. The street leading along the banks of the river leading towards the castle is ulica Smocza, which translates as "Dragon Street".

== See also ==
- List of dragons in mythology and folklore
- al-Mi'raj
- Esfandiyār (Isfandiyar)
