= Wawel Dragon (statue) =

Statue in Kraków, Poland

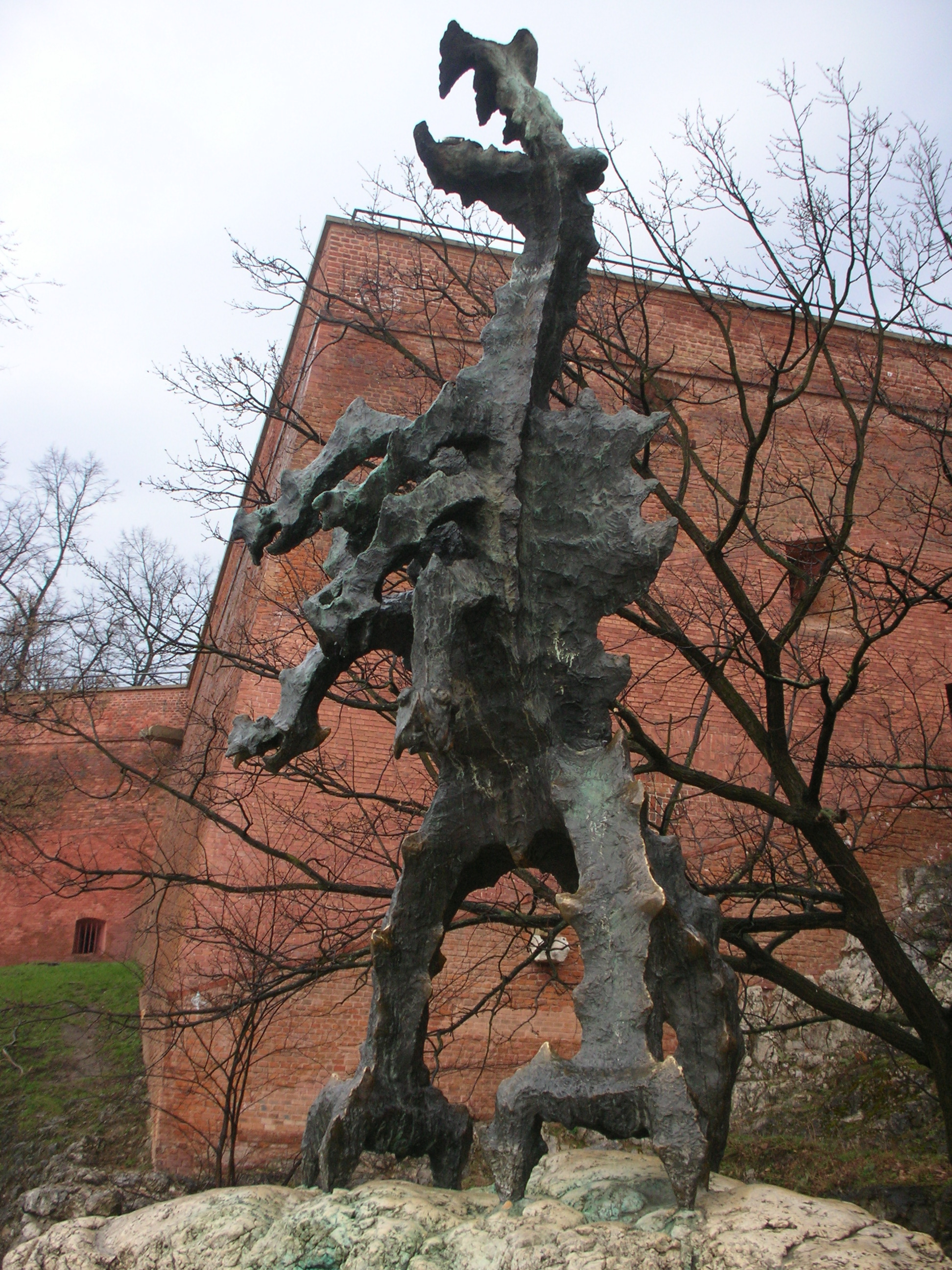
- Artist: Bronisław Chromy
- Year: 1969
- Type: Bronze statue
- Dimensions: 600 cm (240 in)
- Location: Kraków; 50°03′10″N 19°56′07″E

Wawel Dragon Statue (Polish: Pomnik Smoka Wawelskiego) is a monument at the foot of the Wawel Hill in Kraków, Poland, in front of the Wawel Dragon's den, dedicated to the mythical Wawel Dragon. Installed in 1972, the statue is capable of letting out fire from its mouth on demand. Usually it does so every 15 minutes.

== Legend ==
The Wawel Dragon (Polish: Smok Wawelski) is a famous dragon in Polish mythology who lived in a cave at the foot of Wawel Hill on the banks of the Vistula River. One of the many popular stories about the dragon takes place in Kraków during the reign of King Krakus, the city's mythical founder. In the legend, the dragon terrifies local villagers by destroying their houses and eating up their young daughters. Desperate to solve the problem, King Krakus promises his daughter Wanda's hand to any brave man who can defeat the dragon. A cobbler named Skuba takes up the challenge and stuffs a lamb with sulphur for the dragon to eat. Skuba leaves the lamb near the dragon cave and the unwary beast devours the bait. Soon after, the dragon's thirst grows unbearable and he drinks so much water from the River Vistula that he explodes from the uncontainable volume. King Krakus then weds his daughter Wanda to the victorious Skuba. In the oldest, 12th-century version of this tale, written by Wincenty Kadłubek, the dragon was defeated by two sons of a King Krak, Krakus II and Lech II.

== Statue ==
The statue was designed by Polish sculptor Bronisław Chromy and completed in 1969; it was installed in its present location in 1972. Bielowicz notes that the statue was made in 1969 but was not unveiled in its current location till 1972. The statue is made out of bronze and stands on a large limestone boulder. It is 6 metres (20 ft) tall.

Video of the statue breathing fire

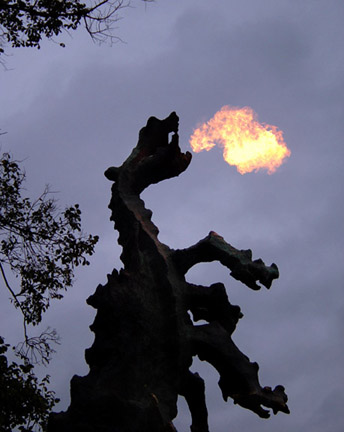
The statue breathing fire

Some early designs for the statue included a more traditional water fountain. A later variant proposed that it should be partially submerged in the nearby Vistula river, but this was rejected. In the end, the statue was designed to breathe fire; it was also modernized recently so that the fire breath can be triggered by a SMS text message (the statue can do so at minimum of 15 seconds intervals). The service is popular, and receives at least 2,500 requests a day. The fire uses natural gas as fuel. Without any text messages, the fire breaths occur at about five-minute intervals.

The statue has been described as a "traditional" element of the modern Kraków landscape, and as a major tourist attraction of the city, particularly for children.
