= Smocza Jama =

Limestone cave in Kraków, Poland

Coordinates: 50°03′11″N 19°56′0″E

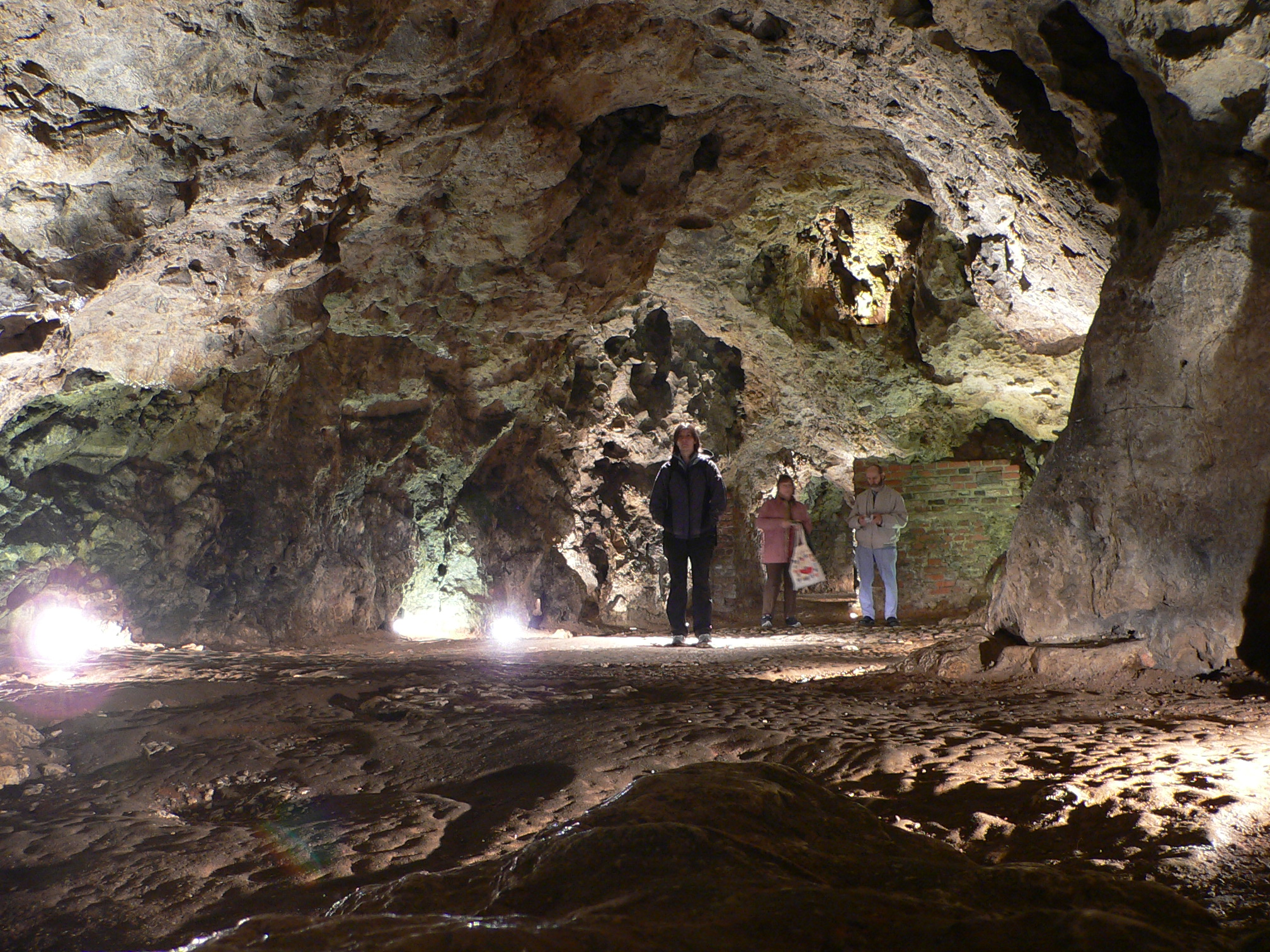
Interior of the Dragon's Den

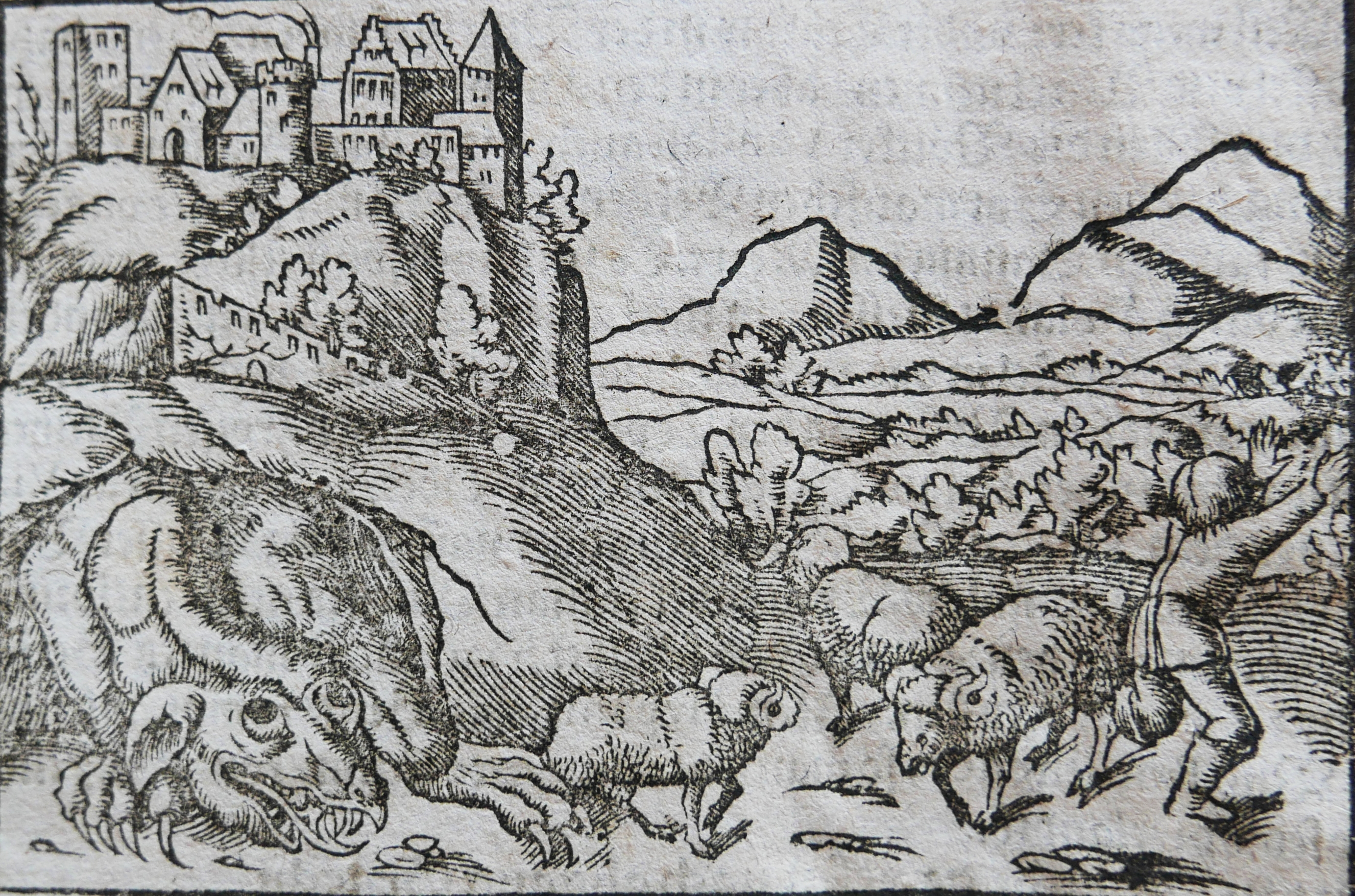
Dragon in its den at the foot of the Wawel Hill (Cosmographia universalis, 1544)

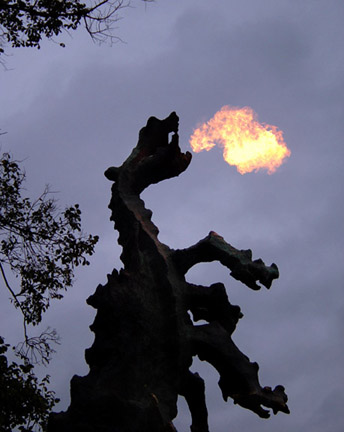
Statue of the dragon

Smocza Jama (Polish for "dragon's den") is a limestone cave in the Wawel Hill in Kraków. Owing to its location in the heart of the former Polish capital and its connection to the legendary Wawel Dragon, it is well known in Poland.

== Morphology ==
Smocza Jama has two entrances, one natural and one 19th-century waterworks well. They are connected by three large chambers. A side passage, discovered in 1974, leads under the St. Stanislaus and St. Wenceslaus's Cathedral. In the underground pools lives a rare crustacean troglobiont, Niphargus tatrensis, relict of the Tertiary sea fauna.

Smocza Jama has a length of 276 m and a vertical range of 15 m.

== History ==
13th century Bishop of Kraków Wincenty Kadłubek wrote in his Chronica seu originale regum et principum Poloniae that:

For there was in the windings of a certain rock a fiercery ferocious monster, called by some a holophage. To its voracity was due each week a particular count of heads of cattle, according to the count of days. Should the citizens neglect to cater for the monster, as if offering a sacrifice, they would be chastened by paying just as many heads of humans. Gracchus, unable to bear such calamity, for he had more love for the land he was son of than for his own children, summoned his sons secretly, brought forward his plans, laid his advice. "These are foes" — he said — "to courage — timidity, to grey hair — unreason, to youth — sloth. For it is no courage if it is timid, no grey haired sagacity if it is unreasonable, no youth if it is slothful. Furthermore, if no opportunity occurs to practice courage, one needs to conceive it. Who, therefore, would ever decline glory that comes of itself, unless he was outrightly inglorious himself! Yet the well-being of citizens, defended and preserved, triumphs for perpetuity. For one should not care of oneself, when there is a danger to the public. Therefore it befits you [...] to arm yourselves to slay the monster, it befits you to face it [...]."

Smocza Jama was first mentioned on the turn of the 12th century in Wincenty Kadłubek's Chronica Polonorum, which is also the source of the first known version of the Wawel Dragon legend, later further developed by Jan Długosz and Marcin Bielski. The name of the cave was first given in 1551 in Marcin Bielski's Kronika wszystkiego świata.

In the 16th and 17th centuries, an infamous public house operated at the entrance to the cave and inside. It served as an inspiration for poets such as Jan Andrzej Morsztyn.

In the 18th century, Wawel was fortified. Inside the cave, supporting pillars were raised under the walls, and its main entrance was bricked up. Two remaining smaller openings were bricked up in 1830. The cave was reopened in 1842 and made accessible to the general public. In 1972, a fire-breathing statue of the Wawel Dragon by Bronisław Chromy was erected at the entrance to the cave.

== See also ==
- Culture of Kraków
