= Princess Wanda =

Polish legendary princess and queen

Wanda
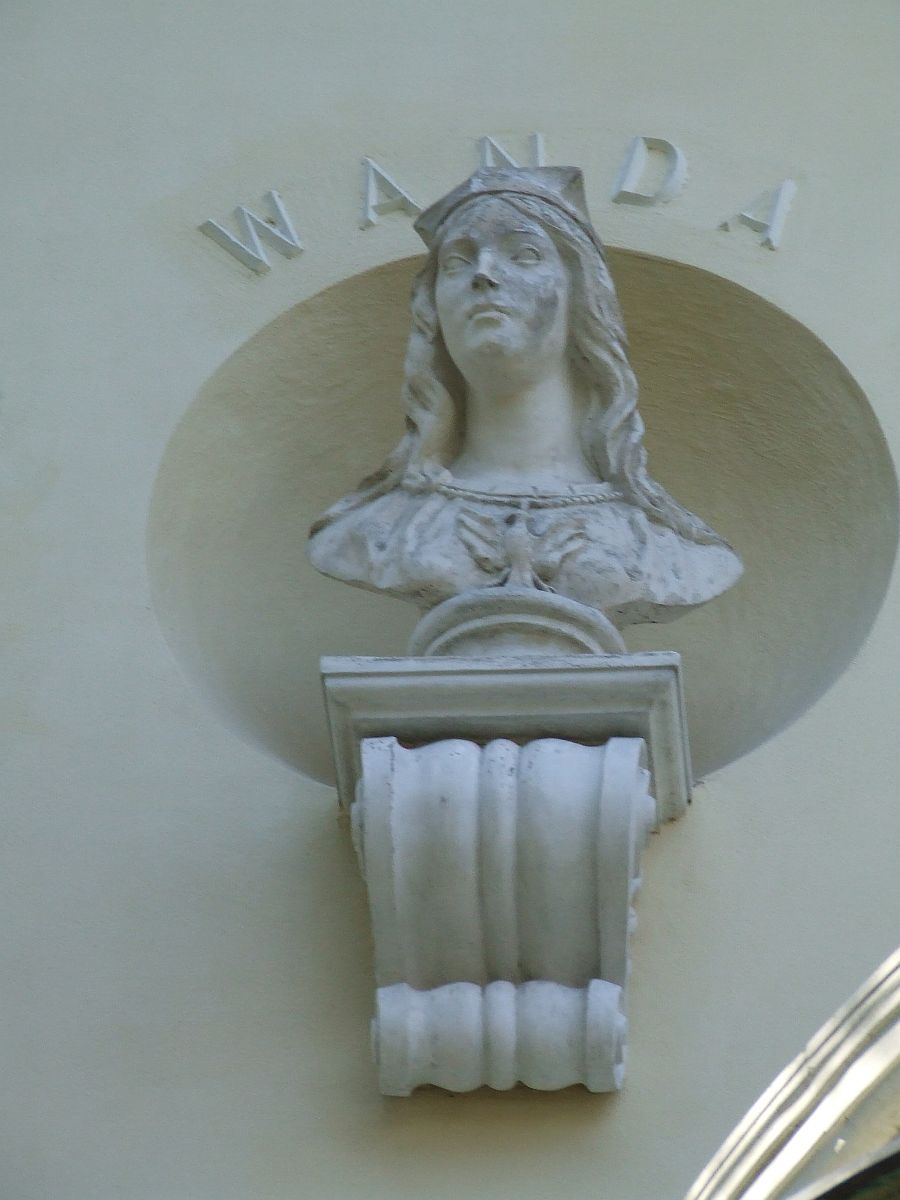
- Wanda's bust in the Ursynów Palace, Warsaw

Legendary ruler of Lechites
- Reign: Between 8th and 10th century?
- Predecessor: Krakus II or Lech II
- Successor: Vacant, eventually Leszko I (supposedly)
- Died: Kraków (supposedly)
- Burial: Wanda's Mound, Kraków (supposedly)
- Dynasty: Dynasty of Krakus
- Father: Krakus
- Religion: Slavic paganism

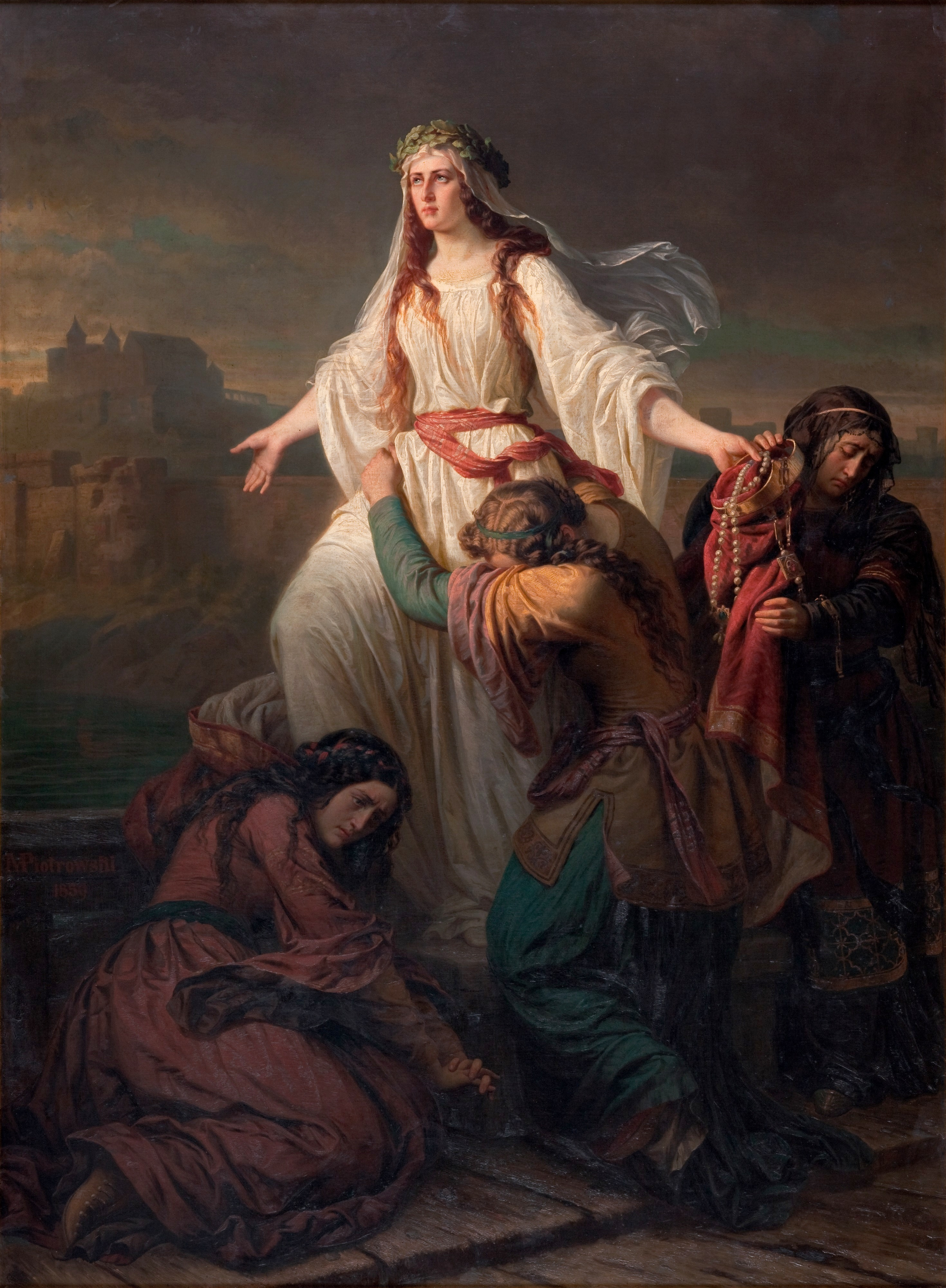
Death of Princess Wanda by Maximilian Piotrowski, 1859

Princess Wanda or Queen Wanda (pronounced [ˈvan.da]; reputedly lived in 8th century Poland) was the daughter of the Lechitic King Krakus, legendary founder of Kraków, and sister to his sons. Upon the death of one of her brothers and the exile of the other, she became the ruler of the Poles.

== Legendary biography ==
The first written record of the legend of Wanda was made by the Polish chronicler Wincenty Kadłubek. In this version of the story, Wanda ruled Poland after her father, when her lands were invaded by an "Alamann tyrant". Wanda led her troops out to meet him. Seeing her beauty, the German troops refused to fight and their leader committed suicide. Towards the end of the story Kadłubek states that "the river Vandalus [a name he used for the Vistula] is named after" her and hence the people she ruled over were known as "Vandals". In this version Wanda remained unmarried and had a long life.

Subsequent versions of the story differ significantly. In the version from the Wielkopolska Chronicle, the Alemannic leader, Rytygier (Rüdiger), first wanted to marry Wanda and invaded her lands when she refused. Here, he died during the ensuing battle, while it was Wanda who committed suicide afterwards, as thanks and a sacrifice to the pagan gods who gave her victory. In yet other versions of the story, Wanda commits suicide by throwing herself into the Vistula river, because she knows there will be future suitors who will use her refusal to marry as a pretext for an invasion. This variation was popularised by the 15th-century historian Jan Długosz.

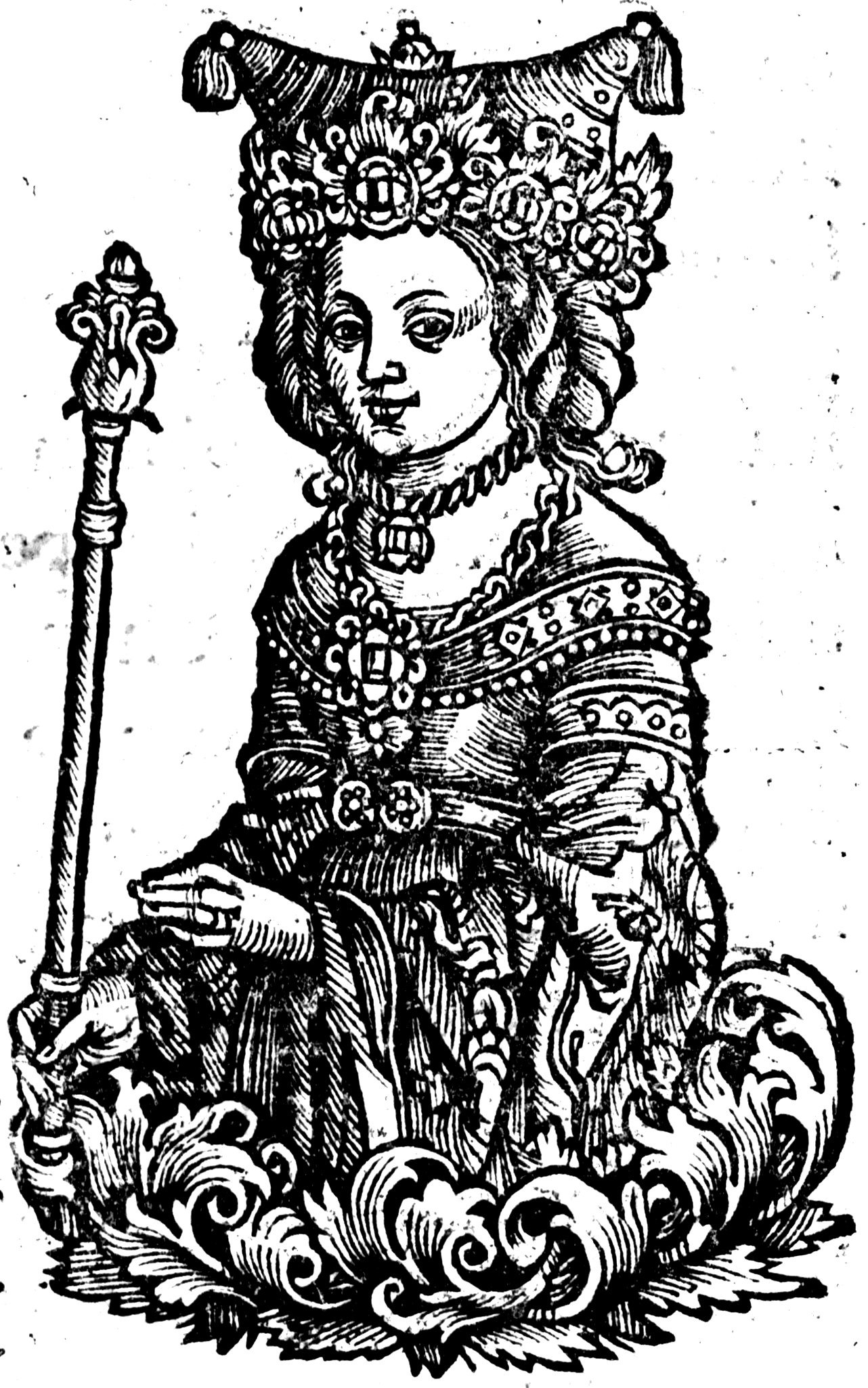
16th-century imaginary portrait of Wanda in the Chronica Polonorum.

== Historicity ==
Some historians believe Kadłubek invented legend about Wanda on his own. However, Michael Morys-Twarowski points that the chronicler appears to be baffled by the female succession after Krak and tries to validate his revelation to the reader by bringing example of another female ruler, Semiramis. Morys-Twarowski also notes that the name "Wanda" is very unusual, suggesting the old oral tradition. He speculates if the Queen indeed existed, she could have been a regent for a young male relative (whose name was forgotten in the tradition), similarly like other Slavic female rulers, Drahomira of Bohemia and Olga of Kiev, or that she could have taken the throne as the last living member of her dynasty.

While Morys-Twarowski acknowledges that indeed "even in the tale of Master Wincenty, she [Wanda] appears to be a god-like entity whose majesty stops invaders", he also states he does "not see the elements in the story about Wanda that would unequivocally sentence her to be non-historical being". He speculates that the tale about Aleman warriors attacking the kingdom of Wanda might have been a cultural memory of Charlemagne's armies invading area of modern-day southern Poland.

== Cultural influences ==
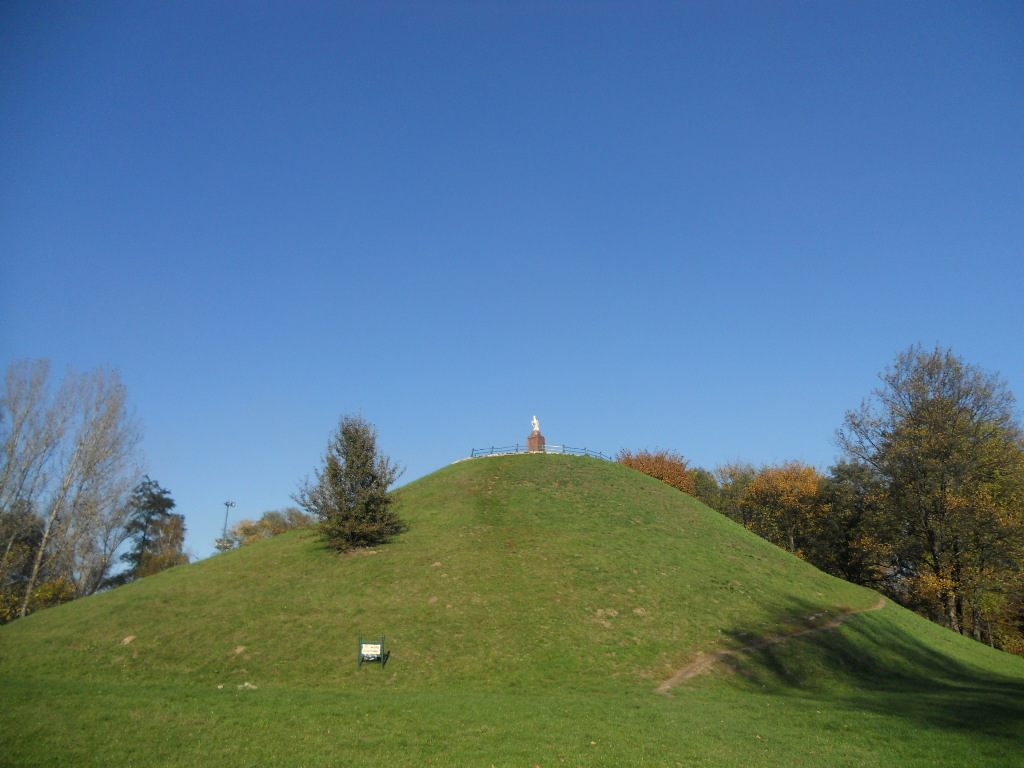
Wanda's Mound on Kraków's Ujastek Mogilski Street

Wanda's Mound (Polish: Kopiec Wandy) is assumed to be the princess' burial place. Until the 19th century, bonfires were lit at the mound on Pentecost.

The nearby industrial district of Nowa Huta, established on 1949, began construction on Wanda's name day (23 June). Princess Wanda is thus a semi-official patron of the district, which contains a trade center, street, bridge, and stadium named after her.

The German poet Zacharias Werner wrote a drama named Wanda, which under Werner's friend Goethe was performed on stage in 1809.

Wanda's story is very popular in Polish art, culture, and literature. The Polish poet C.K. Norwid visited the Mound in 1840 and composed an epic narrative poem, "Wanda", in honor of the ancient Polish princess and queen.

Wanda (also spelled as Vanda) outside of Poland - Vanda the title and protagonist of the 1876 Antonín Dvořák grand opera, Wanda; the protagonist of the 1809 stage play Wanda written by German poet Zacharias Werner and directed by Johann Wolfgang von Goethe; Wanda, heroine of the 1840 narrative poem "Wanda" by the Polish poet C. K. Norwid; Wanda, subject of the 1868 play Wanda, the Polish Queen by the Croatian dramatist Matija Ban; Wanda von Dunajew, protagonist of Leopold von Sacher-Masoch's 1870 novel Venus in Furs; Wanda von Chabert, the protagonist of the 1881 Guy de Maupassant story "In Various Roles"; "Kinda Fonda Wanda" a song by Neil Young on his 1983 album Everybody's Rockin'.

Antonín Dvořák composed the fifth of his 11 operas, the tragedy Vanda around this episode in Polish legends. Writing in 1875, he cast the story as a struggle between the pagan West Slavs and the Christian Teutons.

In 1890, a statue designed by the Polish artist Jan Matejko depicting an eagle turning to the west was mounted on top of the mound. On the base of the statue, the inscription WANDA was carved, together with two swords and a distaff.
