= Krakus' Mound =

Prehistoric tumulus in Kraków, Poland

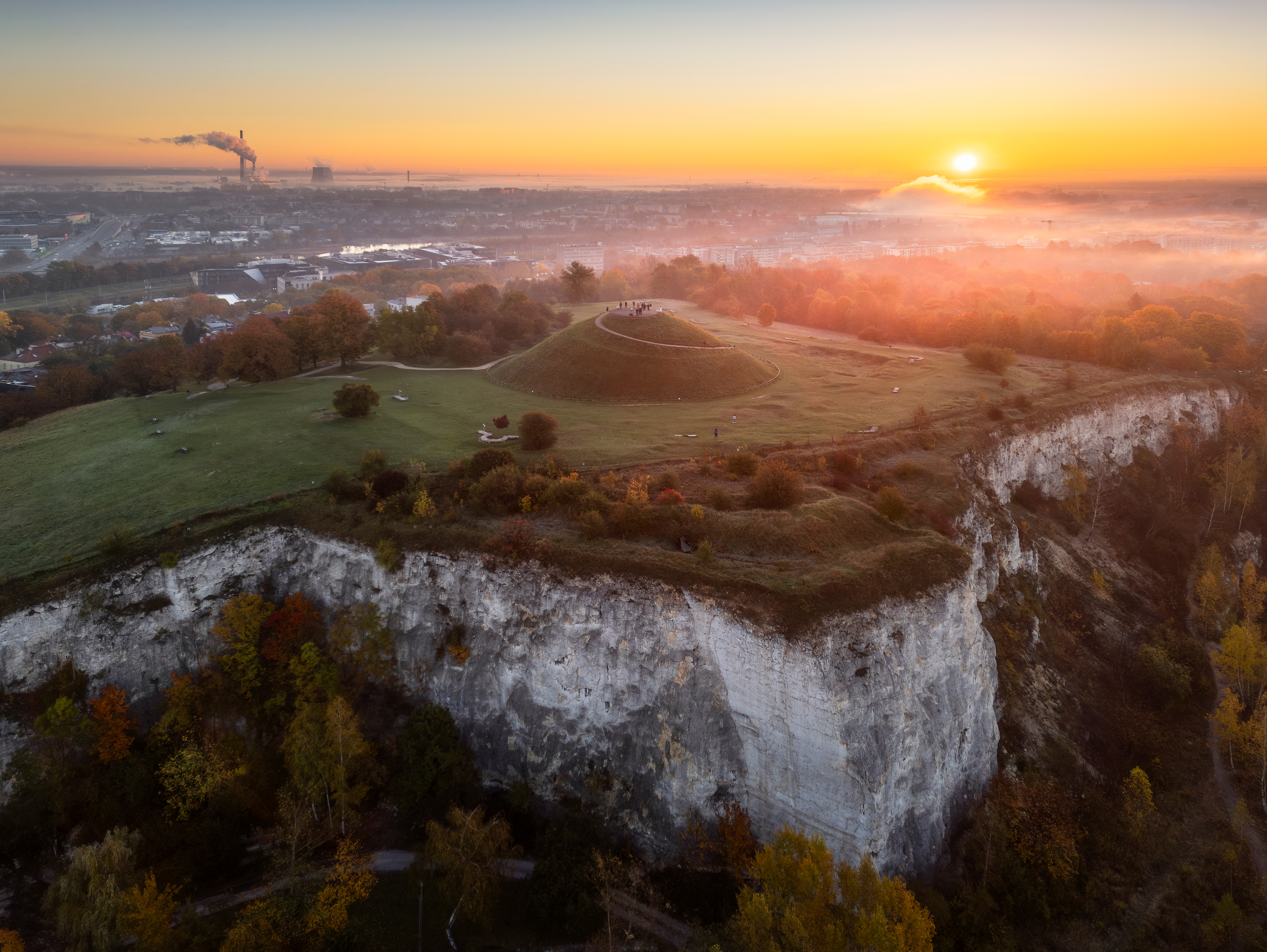
- Krakus' Mound viewed from the west

- Map of lesser Poland showing location of Krakus Mound
- 50°02′17.1″N 19°57′30.3″E
- Cultures: Celtic (hypothesised)
- Location: Kraków; Poland

History
- Built: ~150 BCE (hypothesised)
- Built by: Unknown

Site notes
- Material: Soil, wood, and stone
- Height: 16 metres (52 ft)
- Diameter: 60 metres (197 ft)
- Excavation dates: 1934–1937

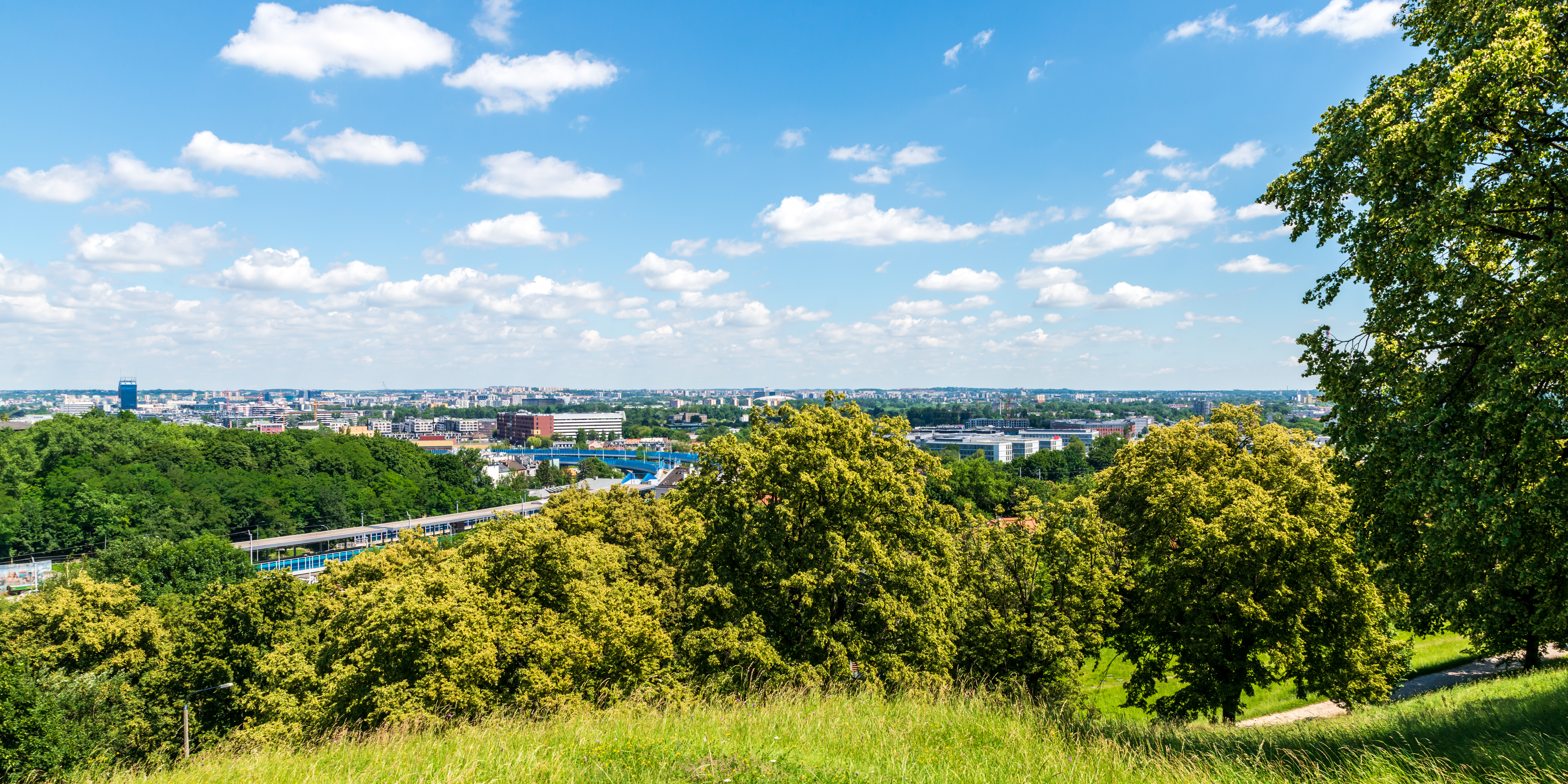
View of Kraków, Poland, seen from Krakus Mound

Krakus' Mound (in Polish. Kopiec Krakusa), also called Krak's Mound, is a tumulus located in the Podgórze district of Kraków, Poland, and is thought the resting place of Kraków's mythical founder, King Krakus.

It is located on Lasota Hill, approximately 3 kilometres (2 mi) south of Kraków's city centre. It is at an altitude of 271 metres (889 ft), with a base diameter of 60 m (197 ft) and a height of 16 m (52 ft).

Together with nearby Wanda's Mound, it is one of Kraków's two prehistoric mounds and the oldest man-made structure in Kraków.

Nearby are two modern man-made mounds, Kościuszko's Mound, constructed in 1823, and Piłsudski's Mound, completed in 1937.

These four make up Kraków's four memorial mounds.

== History ==
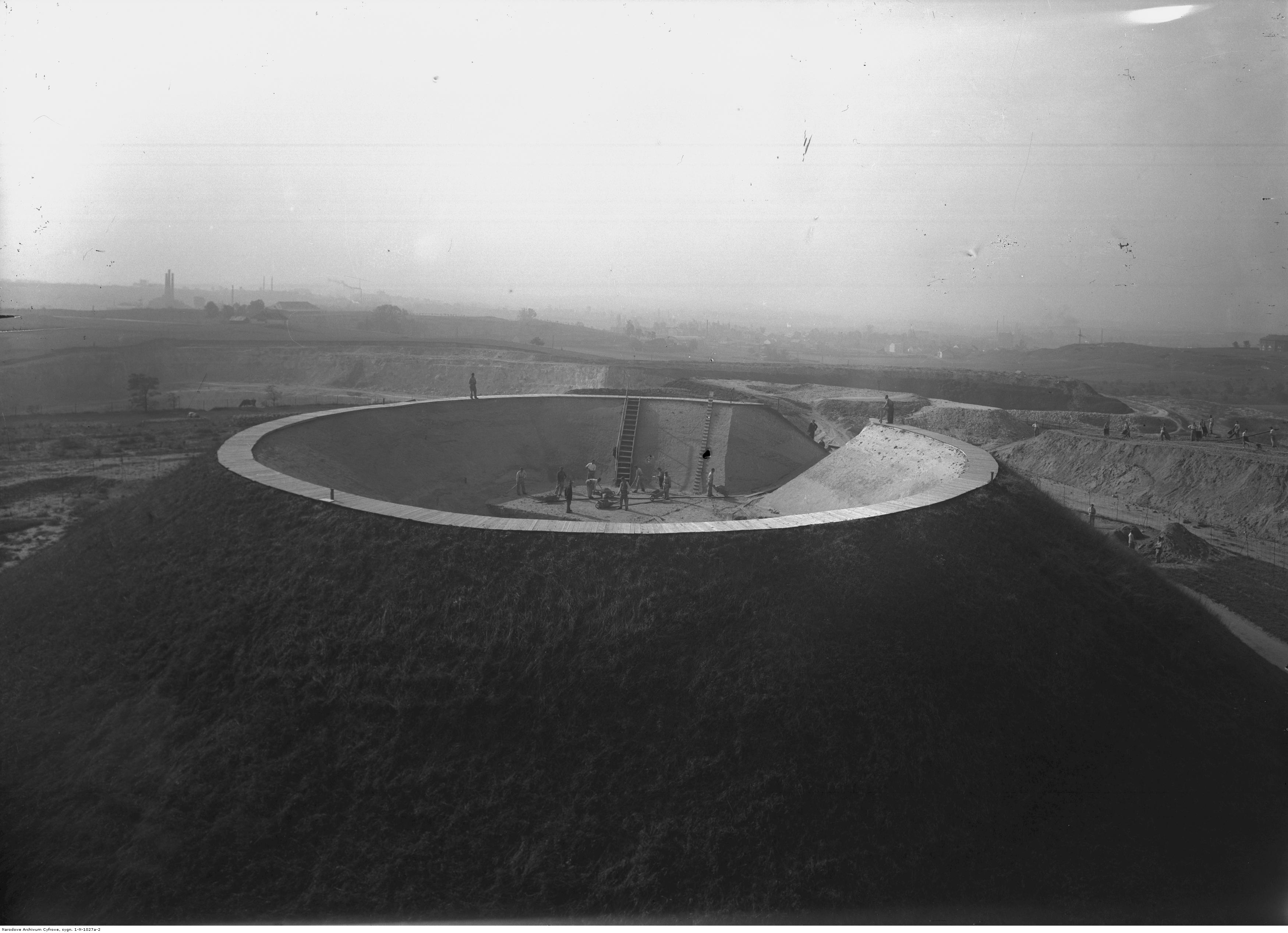
Excavations of Krakus' Mound in the 1930s

The age and the original purpose of the mound remain a mystery, though religious and memorial purposes have been ascribed to the mounds. Excavations conducted in the mid-1930s revealed that the mound consists of a solid wooden core covered with soil and turf. Some artifacts dating from between the 8th and 10th centuries were found inside, but no human remains or bones were discovered. According to another hypothesis, the mound is of Celtic origin and dates from the 2nd-1st centuries BCE.

Mythical origins are connected to the mound. Krakus' Mound is said to have been constructed to commemorate the death of King Krakus when mourning townspeople filled their sleeves with sand and dirt and brought it to the site of Krakus' Mound to create a mountain that would rule over the rest of the landscape, as King Krakus had. Originally, four smaller mounds ringed Krakus' Mound, but they were demolished in the 19th century to create Kraków's city wall.

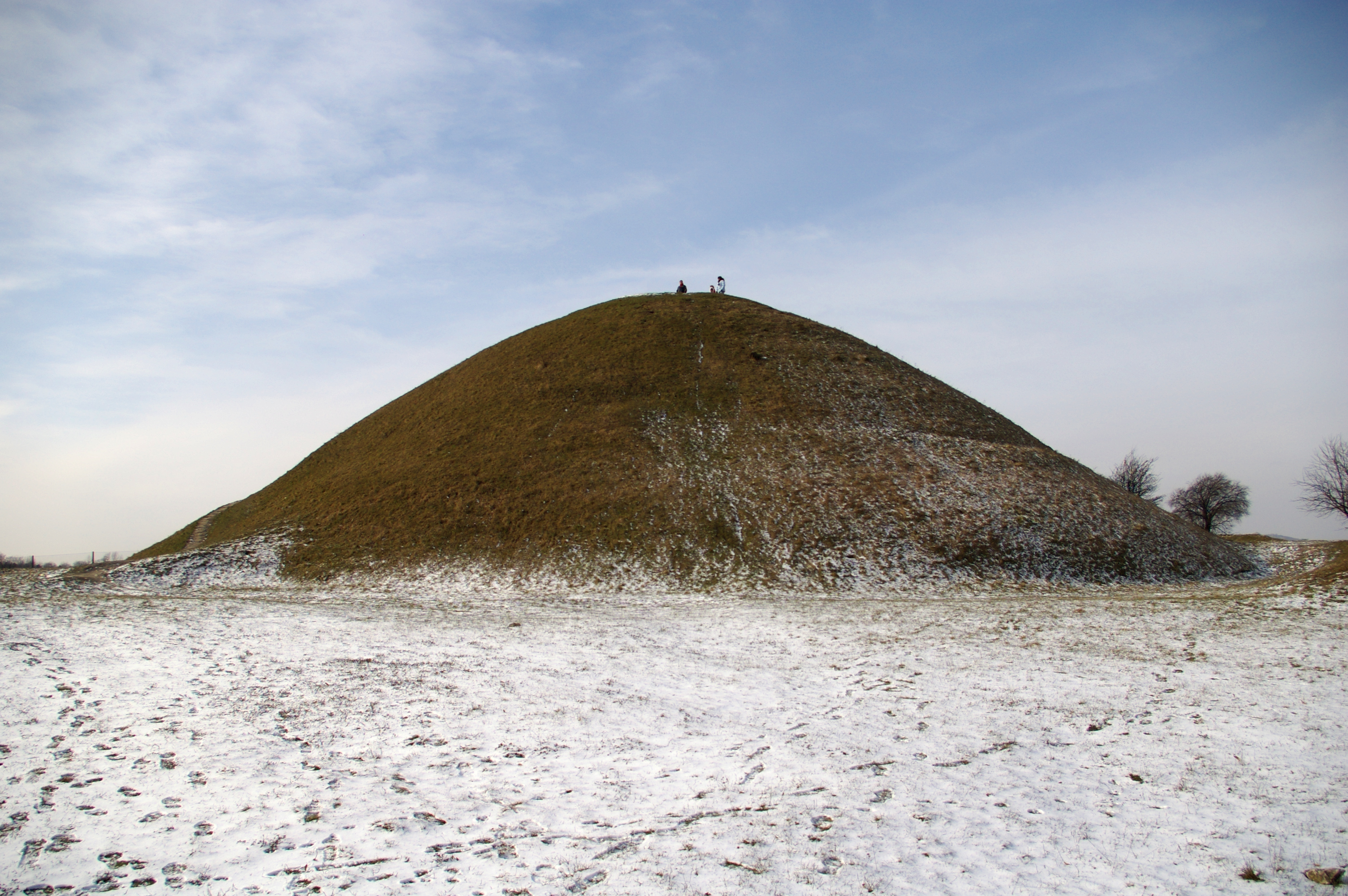
Krakus' Mound in winter

Similarly to other ancient structures such as Stonehenge, Krakus' Mound may have been constructed with astronomy in mind. If one stands on Krakus' Mound and looks toward Wanda's Mound at sunrise on the morning of Beltane, the second-greatest Celtic feast day, one sees the sun rise directly over Wanda's Mound.

Until the mid-1830s, a folk festival was held annually on the first Tuesday after Easter on the slopes of Krakus' Mound. It was revived in the 2000s and is again held annually.

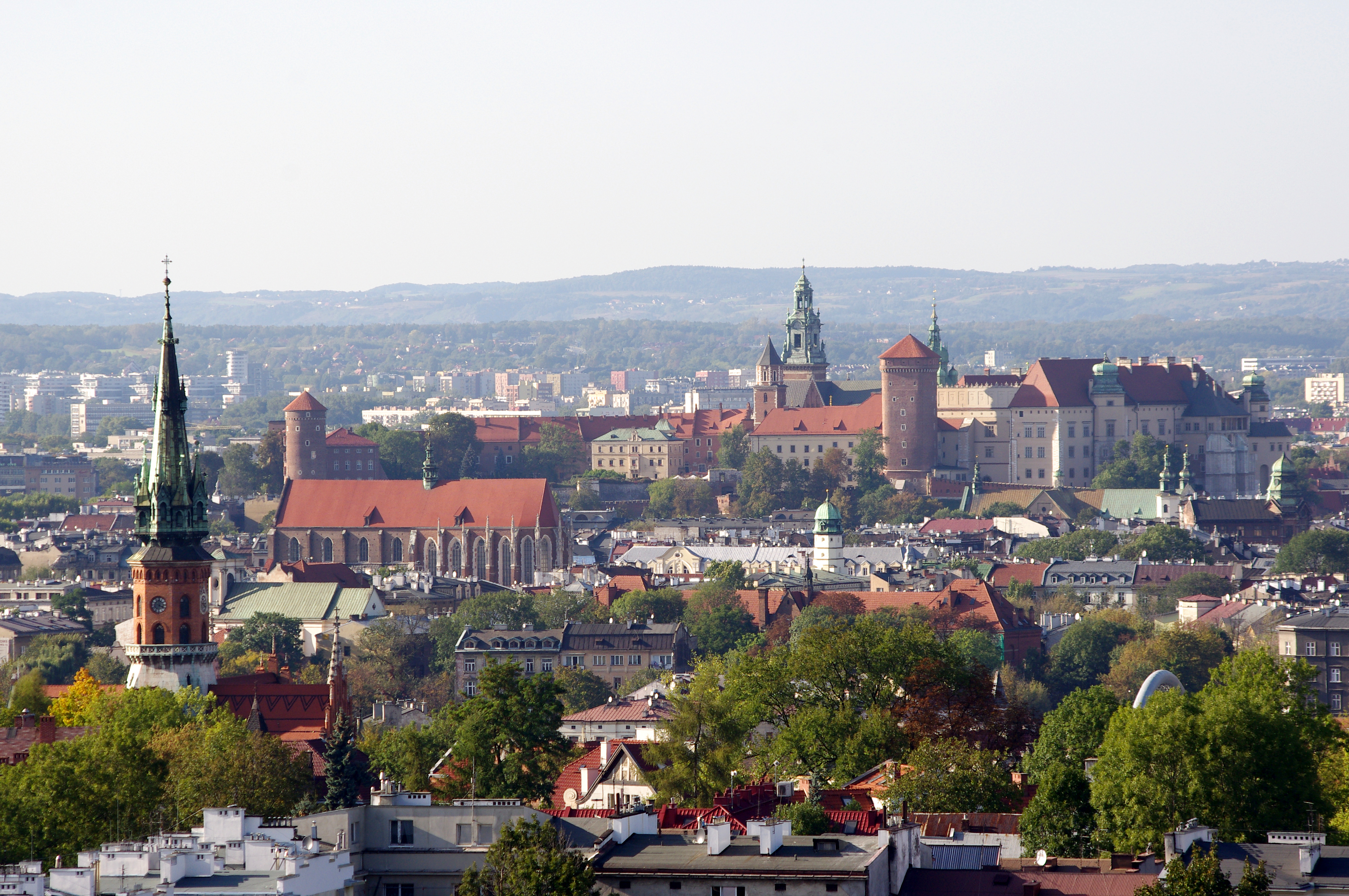
View from the top of Krakus' Mound

== See also ==
- Wanda's Mound, legendary grave of Krakus' daughter
- Kościuszko's Mound, in Kraków
- Piłsudski's Mound, in Kraków

Media related to Krak Mound at Wikimedia Commons
