= Kościuszko's Mound =

Tumulus in Kraków, Poland, finished in 1823

Coordinates: 50°03.17′N 19°53.37′E

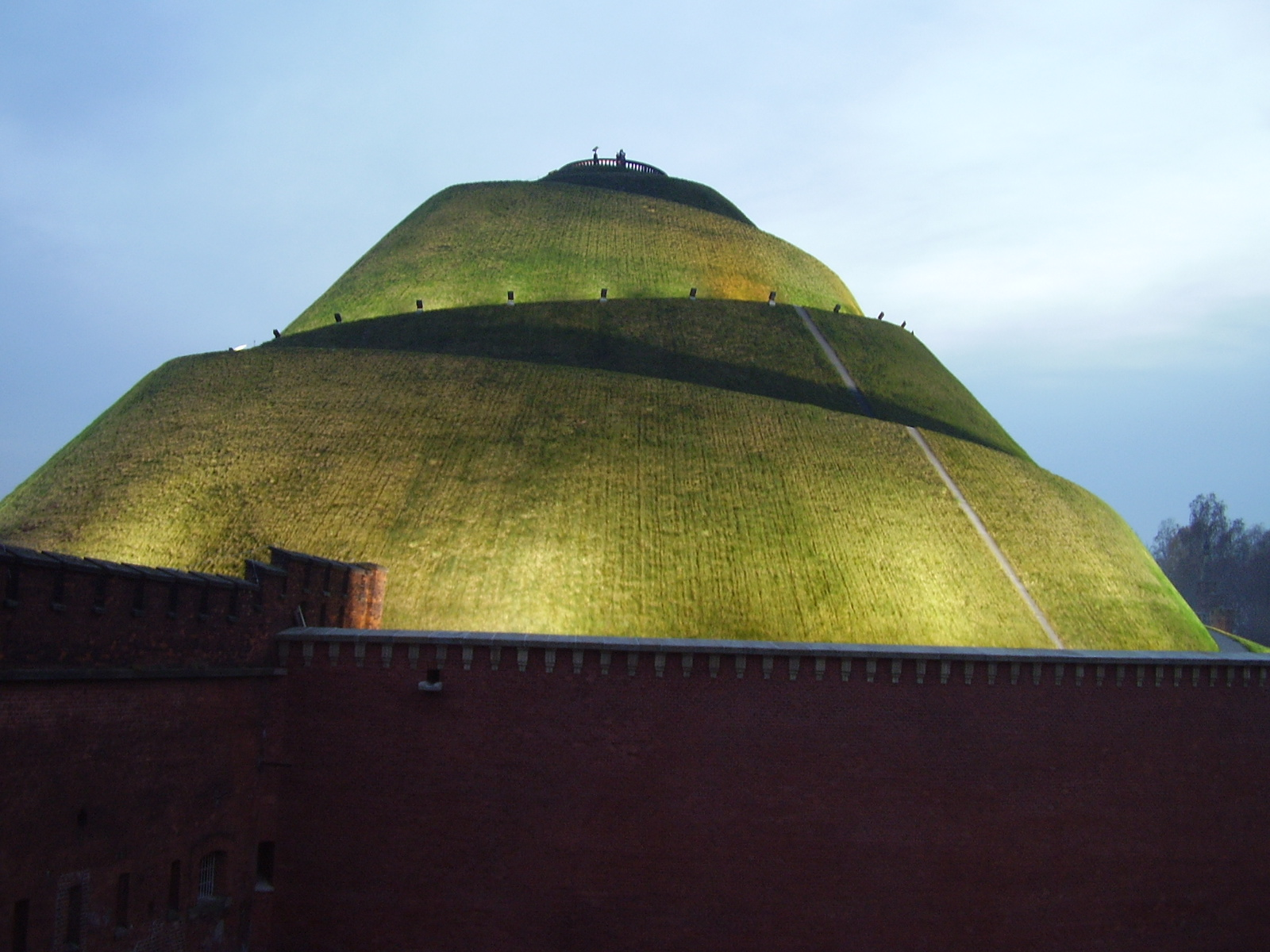
Kościuszko's Mound (2006)

Kościuszko's Mound (Polish: Kopiec Kościuszki) is an artificial mound in Kraków, Poland. It was erected by Cracovians in commemoration of the Polish national leader Tadeusz Kościuszko, and modelled after Kraków's prehistoric mounds of Krak and Wanda.

A serpentine path leads to the top, approximately 326 metres (1,070 ft) above sea level, with a panoramic view of the Vistula River and the city.

== History ==
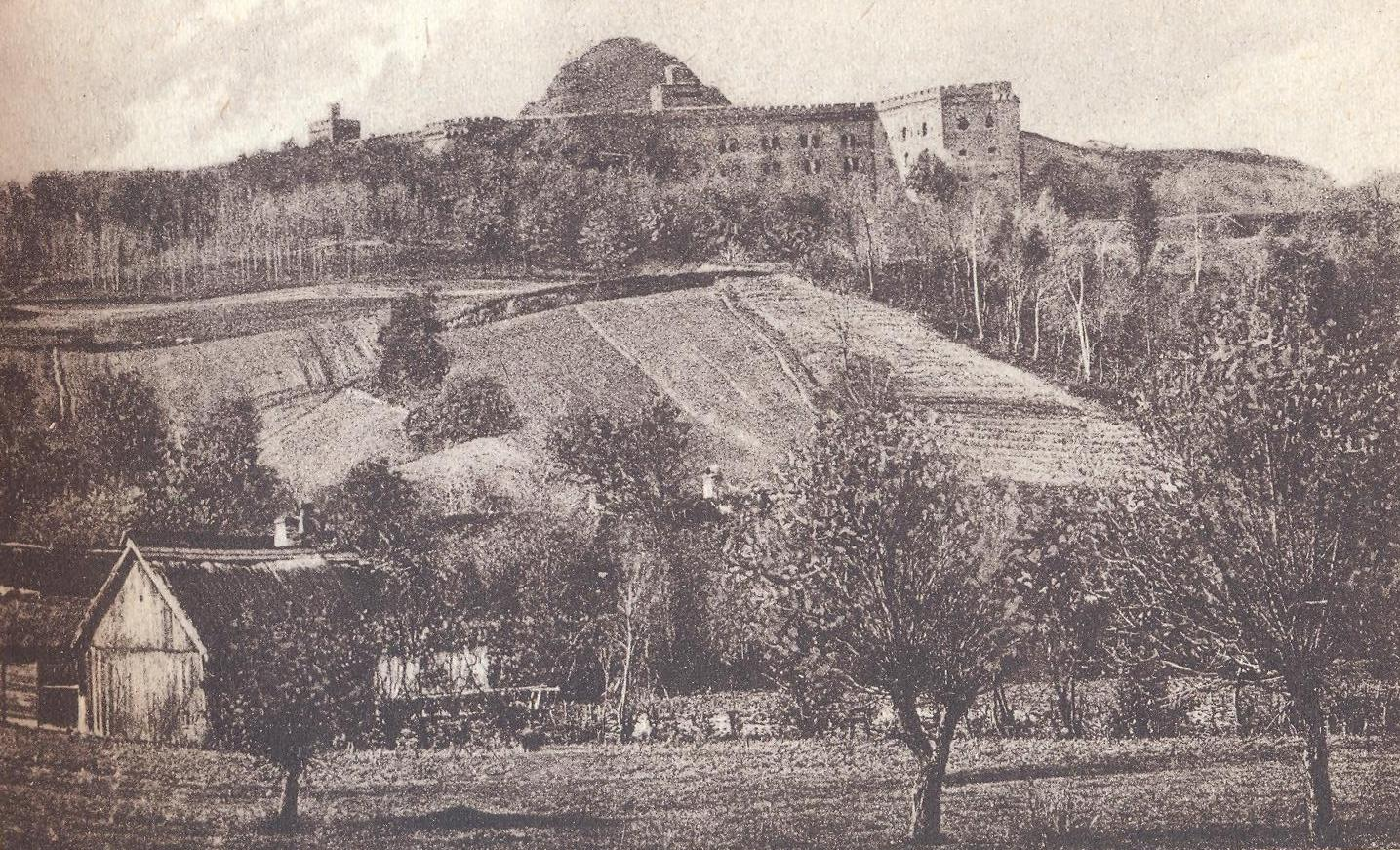
Kościuszko's Mound, 1930s

Kościuszko's Mound (video)

Kościuszko's Mound was completed in November 1823. The location selected for the monument was the natural Blessed Bronisława Hill (Polish: Wzgórze bł. Bronisławy), also known as Sikornik, situated in the western part of Kraków's Zwierzyniec District.

Kościuszko's Mound is one of Kraków's four memorial mounds, consisting of two prehistoric mounds, Krakus' Mound and Wanda's Mound, and two modern ones, Piłsudski's Mound and Kościuszko's Mound.

The founding ceremony of Kościuszko's Mound took place on 16 October 1820. The construction was financed by donations from Poles living in all territories of Poland under foreign occupation. For three years, people of all ages and class voluntarily constructed the mound to the height of 34 metres (112 ft). Work was supervised by a Committee for the Construction of the Tadeusz Kościuszko Monument. At the base of the mound, the Founding Act was deposited in a glass and marble case. At the top, a granite boulder, brought from the Tatra Mountains, was placed, bearing the inscription "Kościuszce" (To Kościuszko). Inside the mound, urns were buried with soil from the Polish and American battlefields where Kościuszko fought. In 1860, on the 30th anniversary of the Polish November Uprising, the top of the mound was crowned with a boulder (545 kg) of granite from the Tatra Mountains, inscribed "TO KOŚCIUSZKO".

Initially, the grounds around Kościuszko's Mound were planned to be turned into a colony settlement for the peasant families that fought alongside Tadeusz Kościuszko in the uprising of 1794. In the late 1830s, those families began to settle at the foothills of Kościuszko's Mound, but the process came to a halt when Austrian authorities decided to turn this area into a part of the city's fortifications.

Between 1850 and 1854, the Austrian authorities built a brick citadel around the mound and began using it as a strategic lookout. As compensation for an earlier historical church that had been demolished, a neo-Gothic chapel of Blessed Bronisława was also built. However, the Austrian fortifications, including the gateway and the southwestern rampart and entrenchment were eventually dismantled following World War II, between 1945 and 1956.

Next to the mound a museum, devoted to Kościuszko, displays mementos of his life and achievements. In 1997 heavy rains eroded the mound, threatening its existence. It went through a restoration process from 1999 to 2003, using state-of-the-art technology and modern materials. The mound was equipped with a drainage system and a new waterproofing membrane.

Kościuszko's Mound inspired Count Paul Strzelecki, Polish patriot and Australian explorer, to name the highest mountain in Australia Mount Kosciuszko, because of its perceived resemblance to Kościuszko's Mound in Kraków.

== The mound in numbers ==
- Mound height: 35.54m
- Mound height above sea level: 330.14m
- Mound height above Vistula level: 131.14m
- Mound diameter: 73.25m
- Mound diameter with retaining wall (tamboure): 90.7m
- Viewing platform diameter: 8.5m
- Mound volume: approx. 167,000m³
- Slope angle: 46°-51°

== Gallery ==
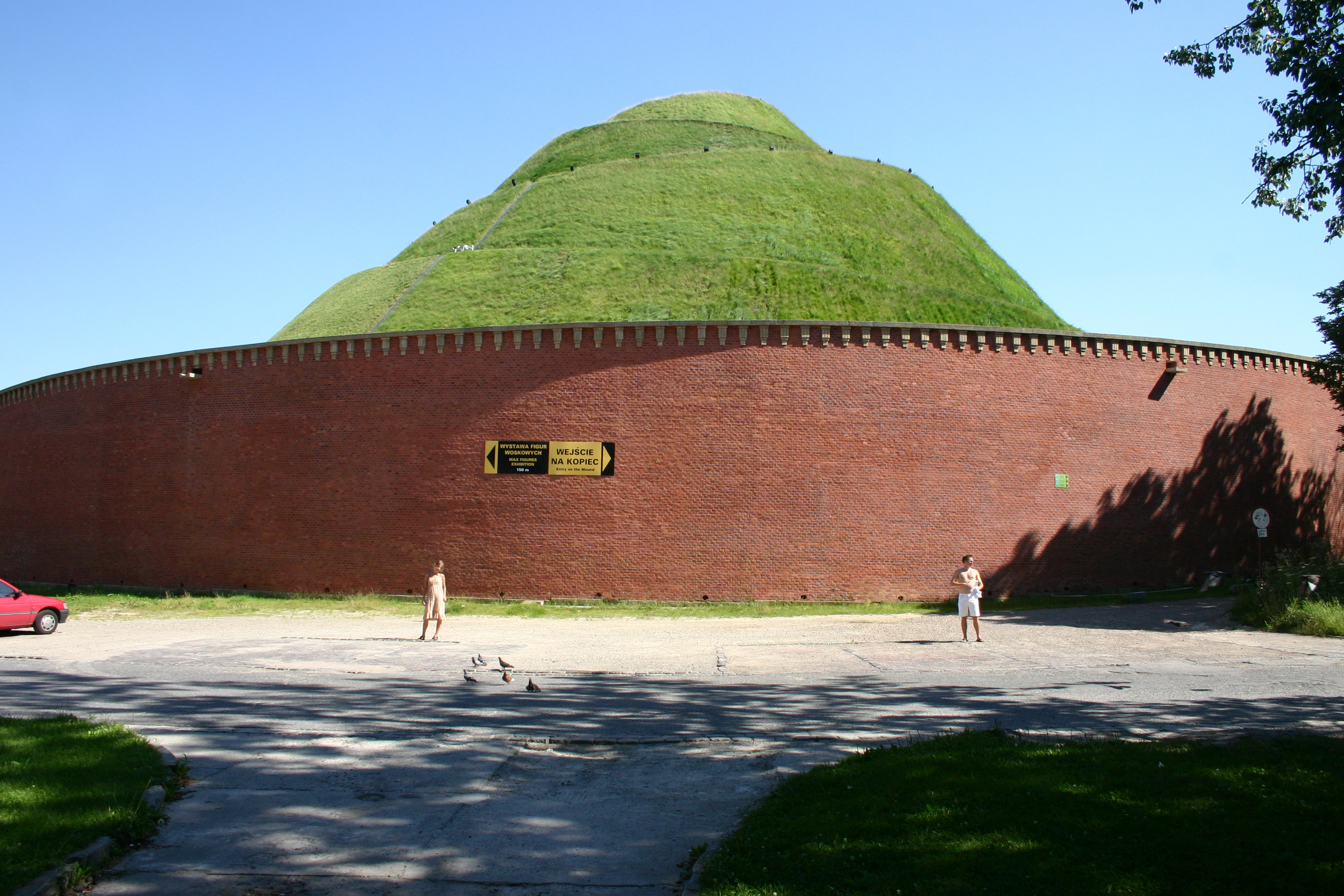
Kościuszko's Mound, Kraków. Note the visitors in the foreground for scale.

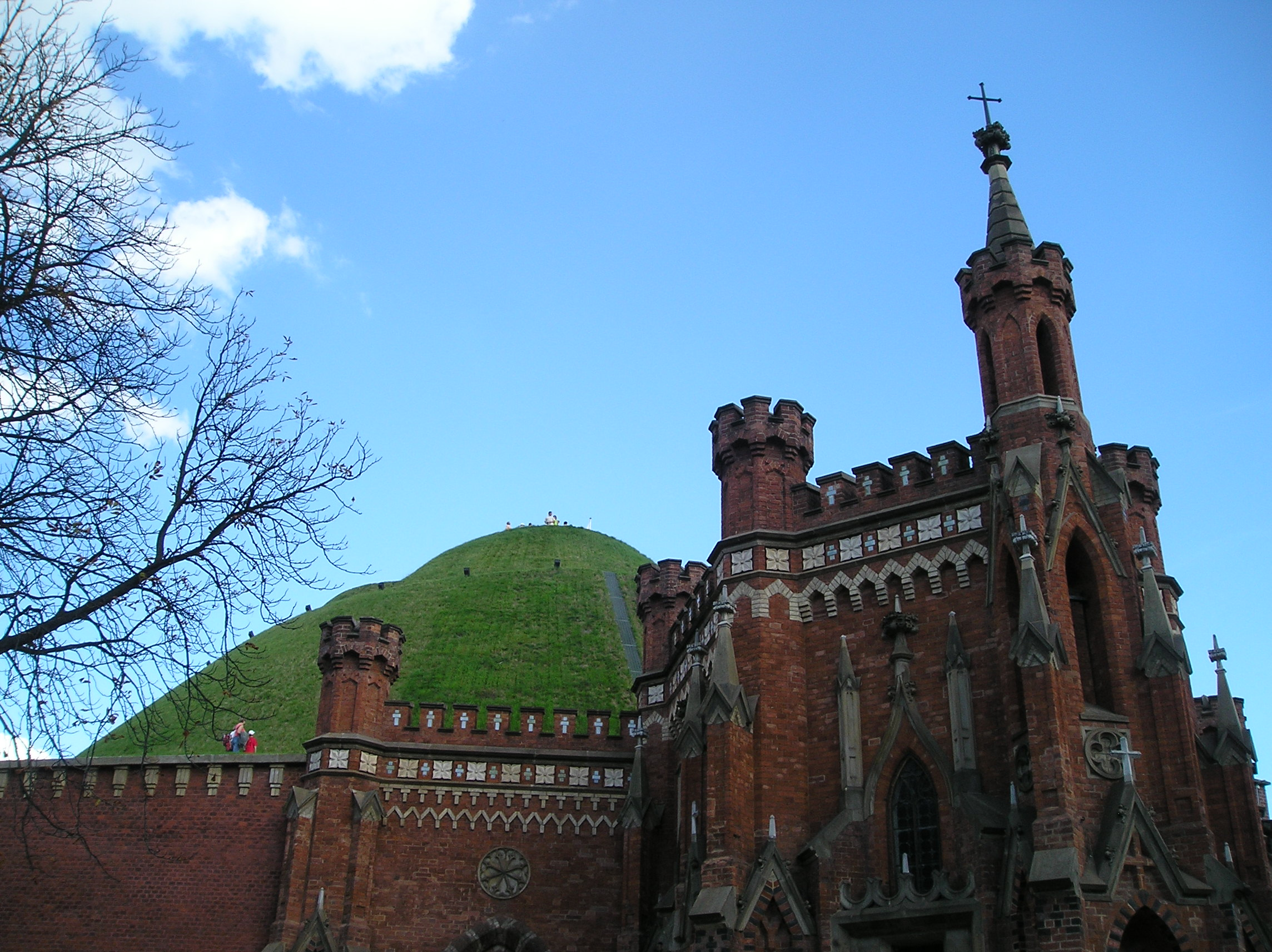
View of Kościuszko's Mound, with Bronisława Chapel at its foot.

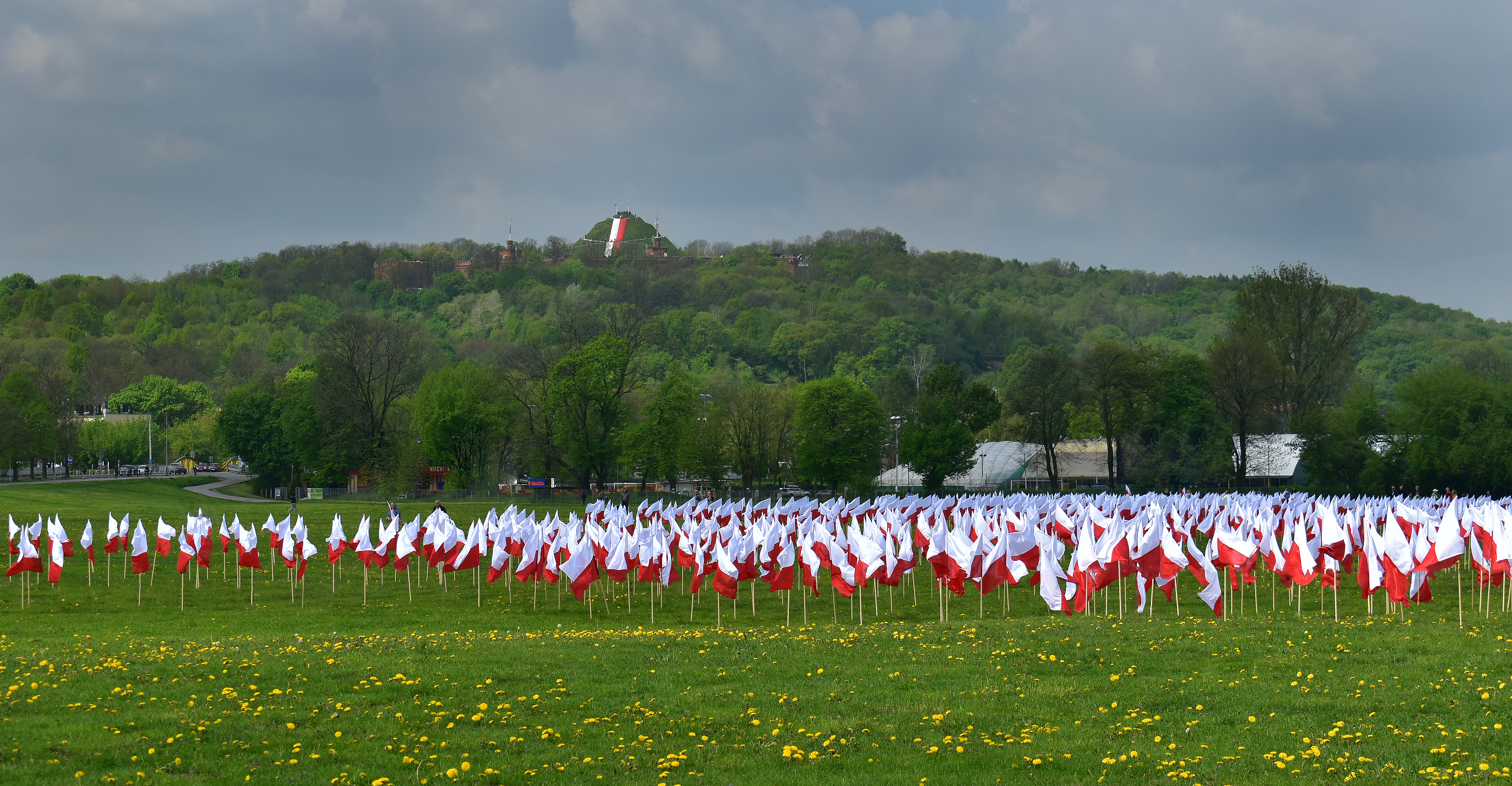
Kosciuszko's Mound, seen from Kraków's Błonia Park,
Polish National Flag Day (2 May 2019)

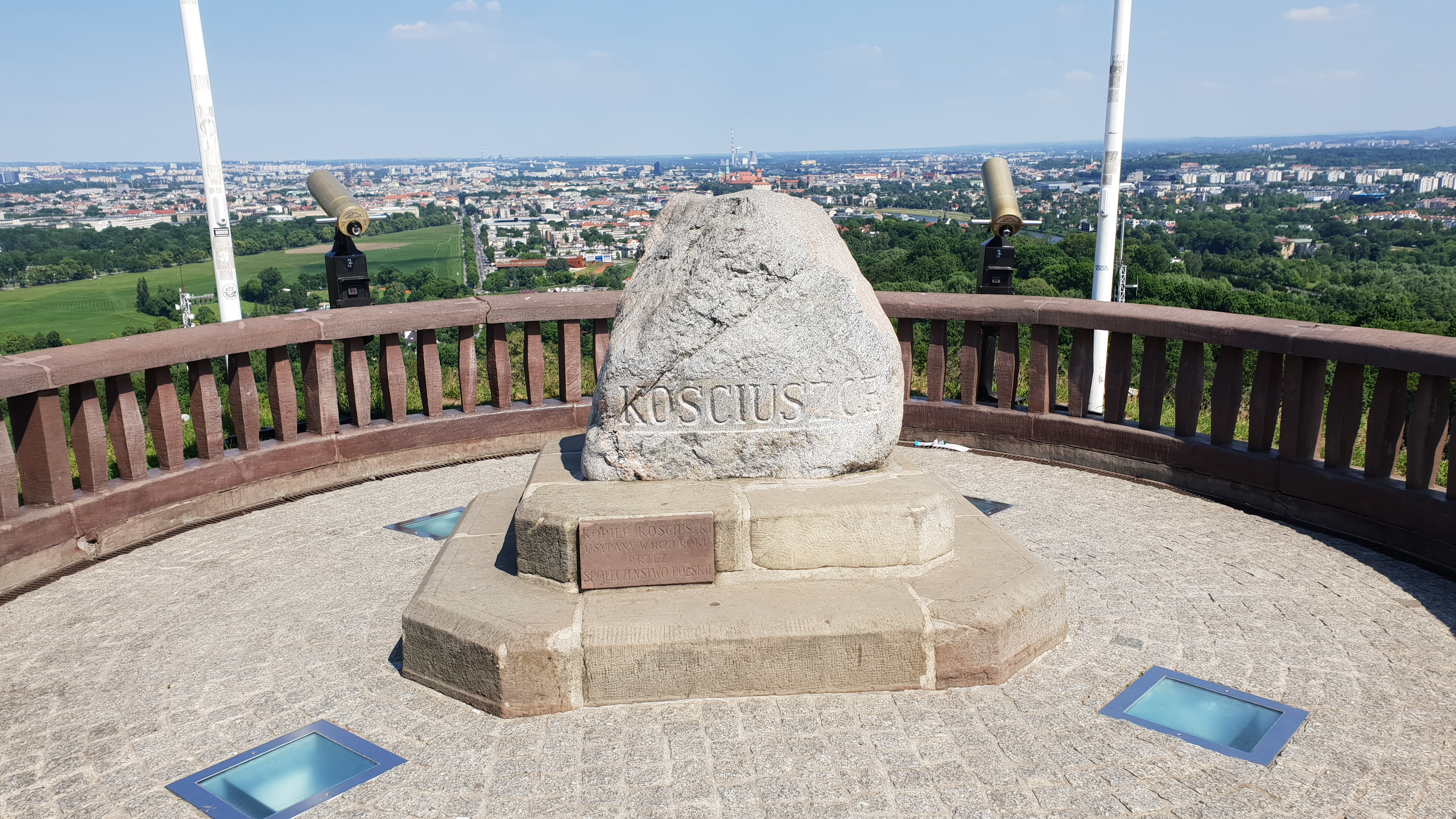
View from the top of Kościuszko's Mound

== See also ==
- Tadeusz Kościuszko Monument, Kraków
- History of Kraków
- Culture of Kraków
