= Wanda's Mound =

Prehistoric tumulus in Kraków, Poland

Coordinates: 50°04′13″N 20°04′05″E

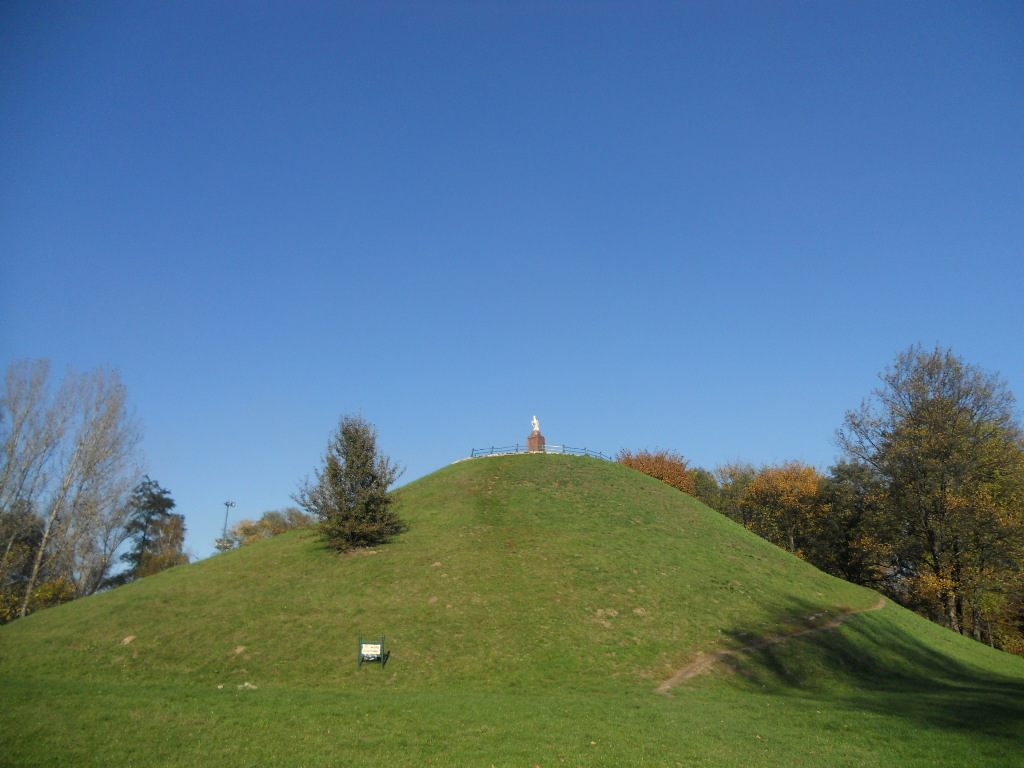
Wanda's Mound

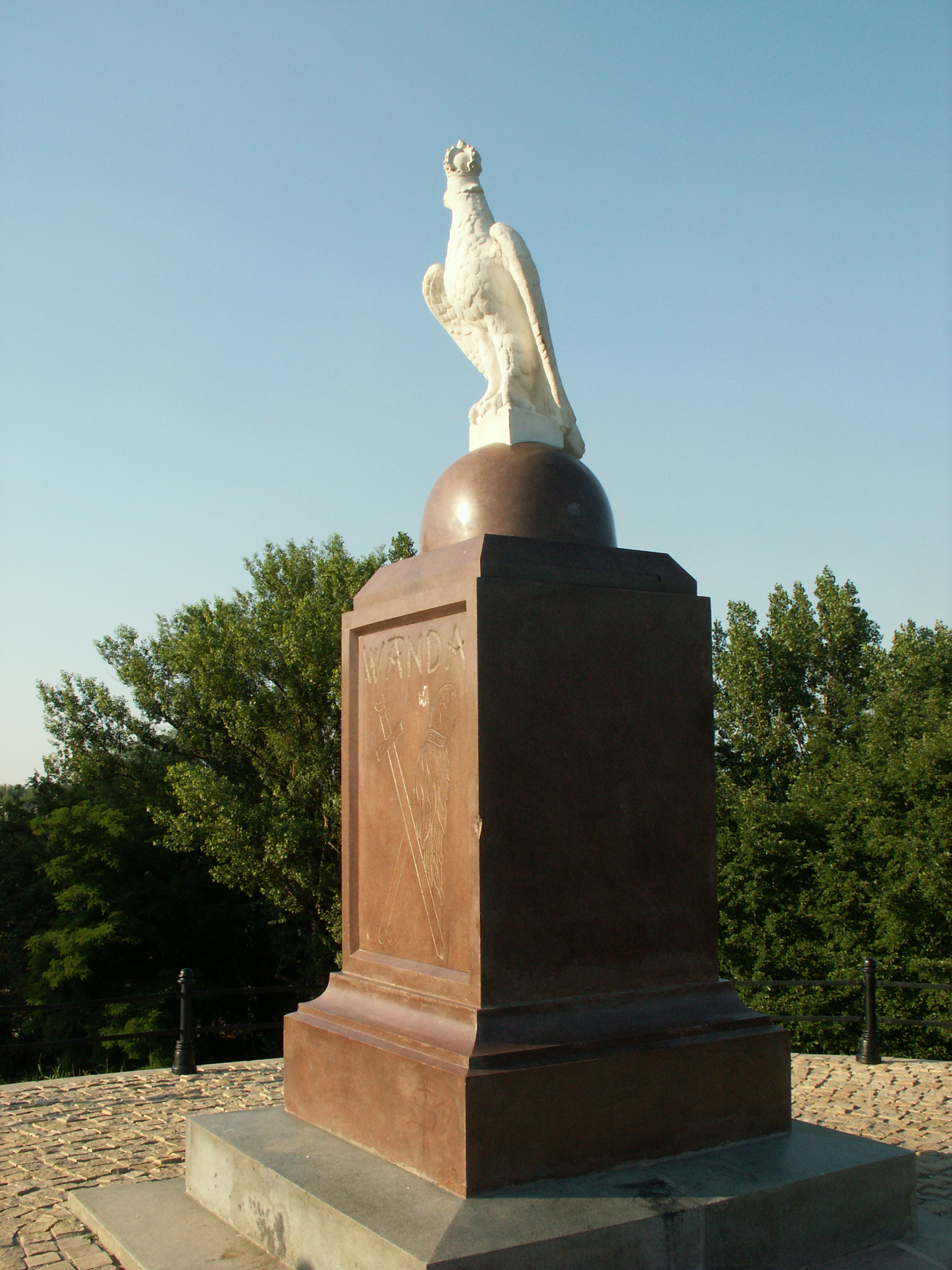
Monument atop the mound

Wanda's Mound (Polish: kopiec Wandy) is a tumulus located in Mogiła (since 1949, a neighbourhood of the Nowa Huta district of Kraków, Poland). The mound is the presumptive resting place of Princess Wanda, daughter of the mythical Krakus, or Krak, the founder of Kraków.

According to one version of her story, Wanda committed suicide by drowning in the Vistula River to avoid unwanted marriage to a German.

The mound is located close to the spot on the riverbank where legend says her body was found. Archaeological studies, conducted in 1913 and mid-1960, provided no conclusive evidence of the mound's age or purpose.

The mound base, some 50 metres (164 ft) in diameter, is at 238 metres (781 ft) AMSL, and its height is 14 metres (46 ft). Unlike the other three mounds in Kraków, this one is not located on a natural hill.

The first written record of the mound comes from the 13th century. In 1225, within two kilometres (one mile) of the mound's site, Kraków's Bishop Iwo Odrowąż built a monastery called the Mogiła Abbey, which remains active. In 1860 it became part of Austro-Hungarian fortifications that were pulled down only in 1968-70.

In 1890 a monument designed by Jan Matejko was erected atop the mound: an eagle on a plinth decorated with a relief of a sword and distaff, and below that, the inscription "Wanda".

== See also ==
- Krakus' Mound, the legendary grave of Princess Wanda's father.
- Kościuszko's Mound, in Kraków.
- Piłsudski's Mound, in Kraków.
