= Brygida Kürbis =

Polish historian, medievalist and source editor

- Brygida Kürbisówna
- Born: September 11, 1921 (age 105); Chełmno, Pomeranian Voivodeship, Second Polish Republic
- Died: November 5, 2001 (aged 80); Poznań, Greater Poland, Third Polish Republic
- Occupation: Historian

Academic background
- Education: University of Freiburg
- Alma mater: University of Poznań
- Thesis: Studia nad Kroniką Wielkopolską (1952)

Academic work
- Discipline: History
- Sub-discipline: Medievalist
- Website: kurbis.amu.edu.pl

Brygida Kürbis (11 September 1921, Chełmno - 5 November 2001, Poznań) was a Polish historian, medievalist and source editor. She focused on history of the Polish historiography and culture in the middle ages.

In 1951 she gained a PhD in history, and in 1957 she passed her habilitation. Kürbis was an editor-in-chief of the academic journal Studia Źródłoznawcze.

== Publications ==
- Studia nad Kroniką wielkopolską (1952).
- Dziejopisarstwo wielkopolskie XIII i XIV w. (1959).
- Myśli i nauki Mistrza Wincentego zwanego Kadłubkiem (1980).
- Na progach historii, Vol. 1–2 (1994–2001).

== Bibliography ==
- Splitt J. A., Kalisia Nowa, Miesięcznik Społeczno-Kulturalny, No. 12, Kalisz 1998.
- Strzelczyk J., Wspomnienie pośmiertne. Brygida Kürbis, "Roczniki Historyczne", Vol. 67 (2001).
