= Krakus II =

Slavic founding legend

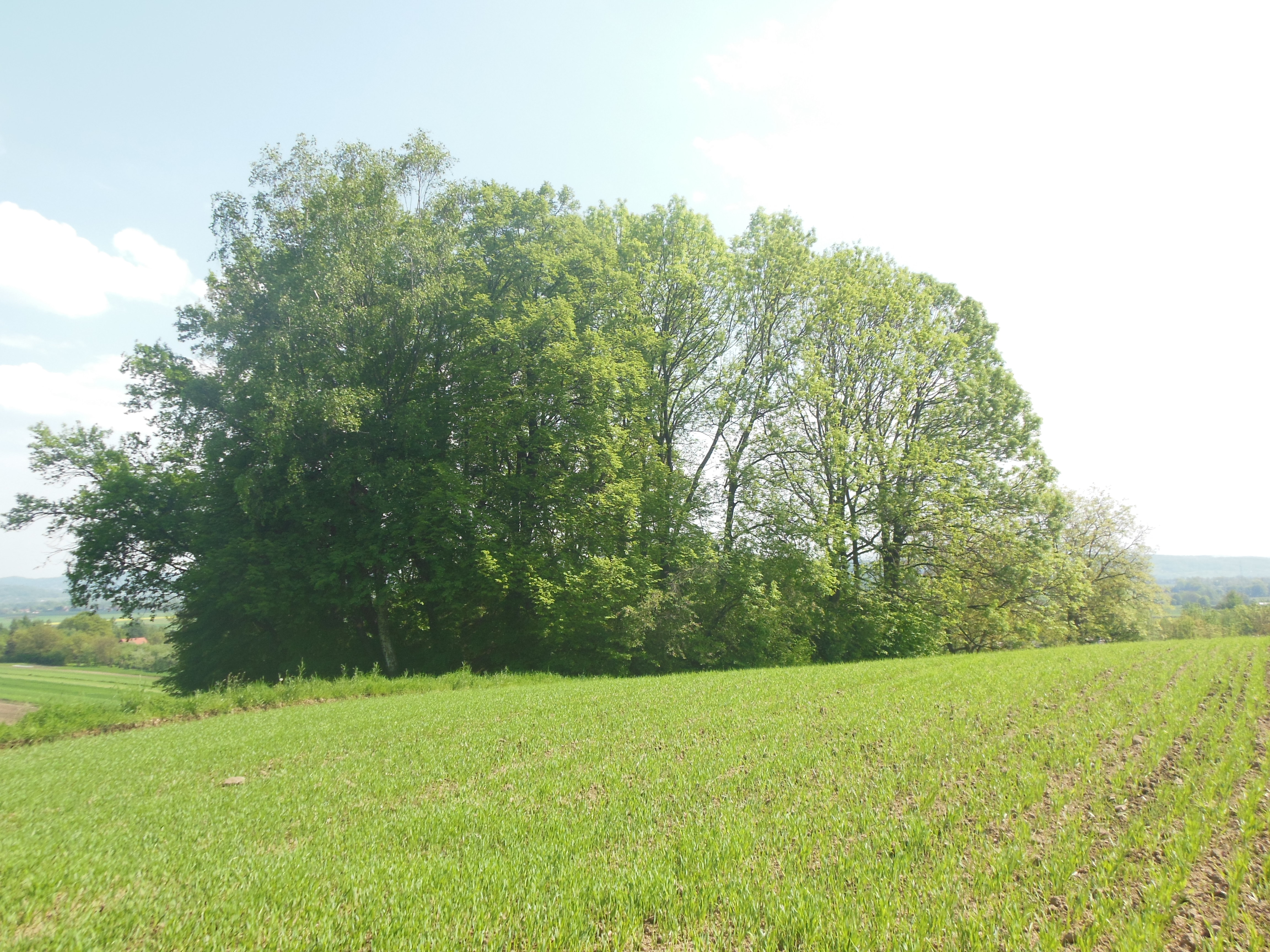
The Krakus II Mound (Polish: Kopiec Krakusa II) in Krakuszowice. According to legend, his grave.

Krakus II (Latin: Gracchus; Polish: Krak) was a mythological ruler of Poland. He was the successor of and son of the Lechitic King Krakus, legendary founder of Kraków, and he was the younger brother of Lech II, according to the 13th century Bishop Emeritus of Kraków, Wincenty Kadłubek. He ties the family to the national story of the dragon of Wawel. In this, their father Krakus sent them to defeat the dragon, which they managed, after an unsuccessful battle, by stuffing the tribute animals with straw, which suffocated the dragon. After this, Krakus II threw himself upon his brother Lech II and killed him, though their father pretended that the dragon was responsible. Eventually, the Polish royal court discovered that he had killed his own brother; Krakus II was overthrown and replaced by his daughter, Wanda. However, according to the 15th-century Polish canon and chronicler Jan Długosz, then Archbishop of Lviv, Krakus II was the elder son and was murdered by his brother Lech II after he had slain the dragon. This occurred after their father's death.

== Bibliography ==
- Mistrz Wincenty Kadłubek: Kronika Polska. Wrocław: Rebis, 2003, p. 13–15, ISBN 83-04-04613-X.
- Jerzy Strzelczyk: Mity, podania i wierzenia dawnych Słowian. Poznań: Rebis, 2007, ISBN 978-83-7301-973-7.
