= Krakus =

Legendary Polish prince, king, and founder of Kraków

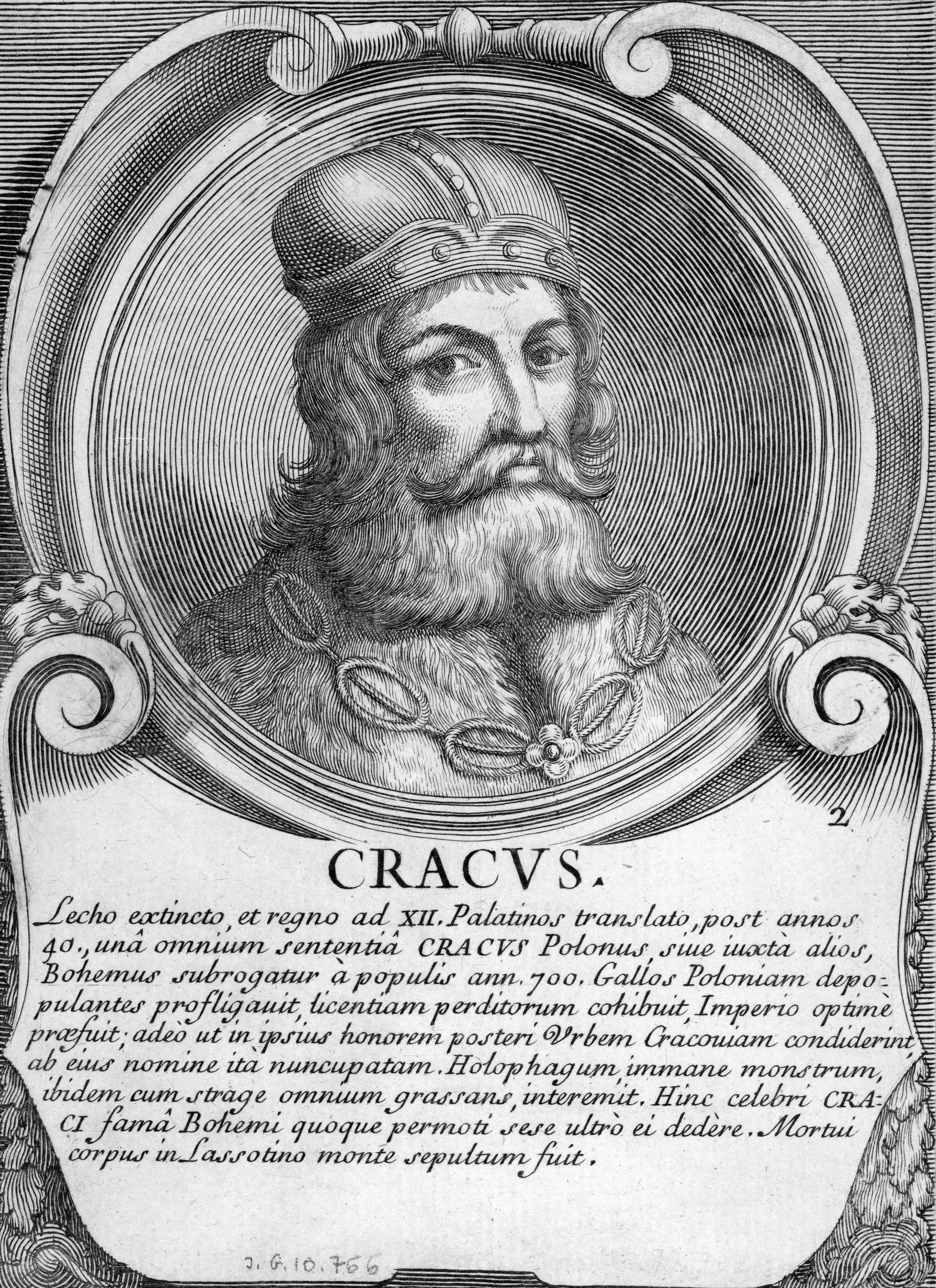

Legendary ruler of Lechites
- Reign: Between 8th and 10th century?
- Predecessor: None (Kingdom established)
- Successor: His younger son (Wincenty Kadłubek and The Chronicle of Greater Poland); Krakus II and Lech II (Jan Długosz)
- Died: Kraków (supposedly)
- Burial: Krakus' Mound, Kraków (supposedly)
- Issue: Wanda; Two sons (various names)
- Dynasty: Dynasty of Krakus
- Religion: Slavic paganism

Krakus, Krak or Grakch was a legendary Polish Duke/non-Christian king, ruler of the Vistulans (a Lechitic tribe), and the presumed founder of Kraków. Krakus is also credited with building Wawel Castle. The first recorded mention of Krakus, then spelled Grakch, and his daughter Wanda is in the Chronica seu originale regum et principum Poloniae from 1190 by Wincenty Kadłubek .

A similar legend, that of Krok and Libussa, appeared in the early Czech history by Cosmas of Prague.

== Name ==
Historian Jacek Banaszkiewicz attributes Krak's name to a pre-Slavic word "krakula", meaning "judge's staff" or "scepter", which also signified judicial authority among the pagan Balts. Historians Cetwiński and Derwich suggest a different etymology, which seems more probable to some, with Krak, meaning simply an oak, a sacred tree, most often associated with the concept of genealogy.

== Family ==
According to Wincenty Kadłubek, Krakus had two sons (whose names are not given by the author) and a daughter, Wanda. The Chronicle of Greater Poland claims his younger son was named after him, and Jan Długosz claims it was Krakus's older son who was his name-bearer, while the younger one was called Lech.

Kadłubek and The Chronicle of Greater Poland claims that Krakus's younger son secretly assassinated his older brother during their father's life and he subsequently succeeded to the throne after the old ruler had died. Jan Długosz on other hand depicts older son outliving Krakus and being murdered afterwards.

== Legendary biography ==
Krakus supposedly had spent some time in Carantania, before returning to area inhabited by Lechites, whom he ultimately united. They subsequently chose him to be their ruler ("king" [rex] according to Kadłubek). While ruling in his kingdom, Krakus was faced with the danger possessed by the monster called "holophagus", who was collecting from his subjects the cattle and was eating people if they refused to give up animals. The monster was eventually poisoned by Krakus's two sons, or (in later tradition) by shoemaker named Skuba.

== Historicity ==
Historian Michael Morys-Twarowski points that the name of the city "Kraków" is most likely a possessive form derived from the name of the founder or the ruler, and is literally translated to "Krak's gord", which would suggest he was the real person in whose honour the town was named. He also theorizes that "holophagus" might have been a cultural memory of raids done by Avars, whose members could potentially have been poisoned while trying to take Krakus's residency on Wawel Hill.

== Burial ==
Krakus Mound, which exists to this day, was previously believed to contain Krakus' remains. It has been the subject of thorough archeological research from 1934 to 1938; however, no grave has ever been found in it. The mound has a diameter of over 50 metres (160 ft). Nevertheless, the mound appears to have indeed served as the burial site; according to research, it was erected between the 8th and 10th centuries. It has been suggested that the mound (as well as Wanda's Mound) hosted the ruler's remain on its surface, presumably in the form of ashes from cremation being deposed into the urn. If so, the mausoleum was destroyed at some point.

== See also ==
- Princess Wanda, Krak's daughter
- Krakus II, Krak's son
- Lech II, Krak's son
Artifacts related to the legend of Krakus

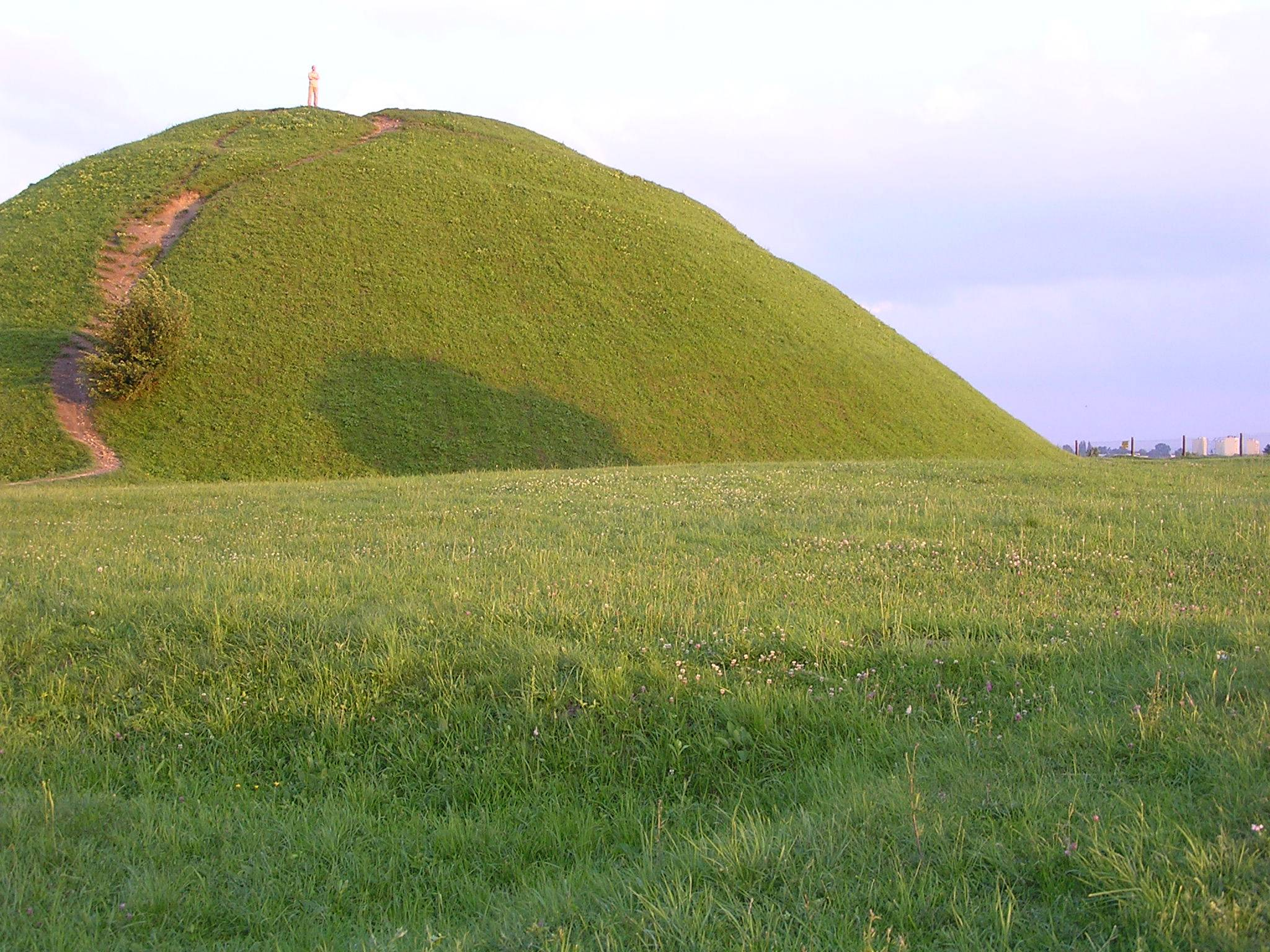
Krakus Mound in the Podgórze district of Kraków

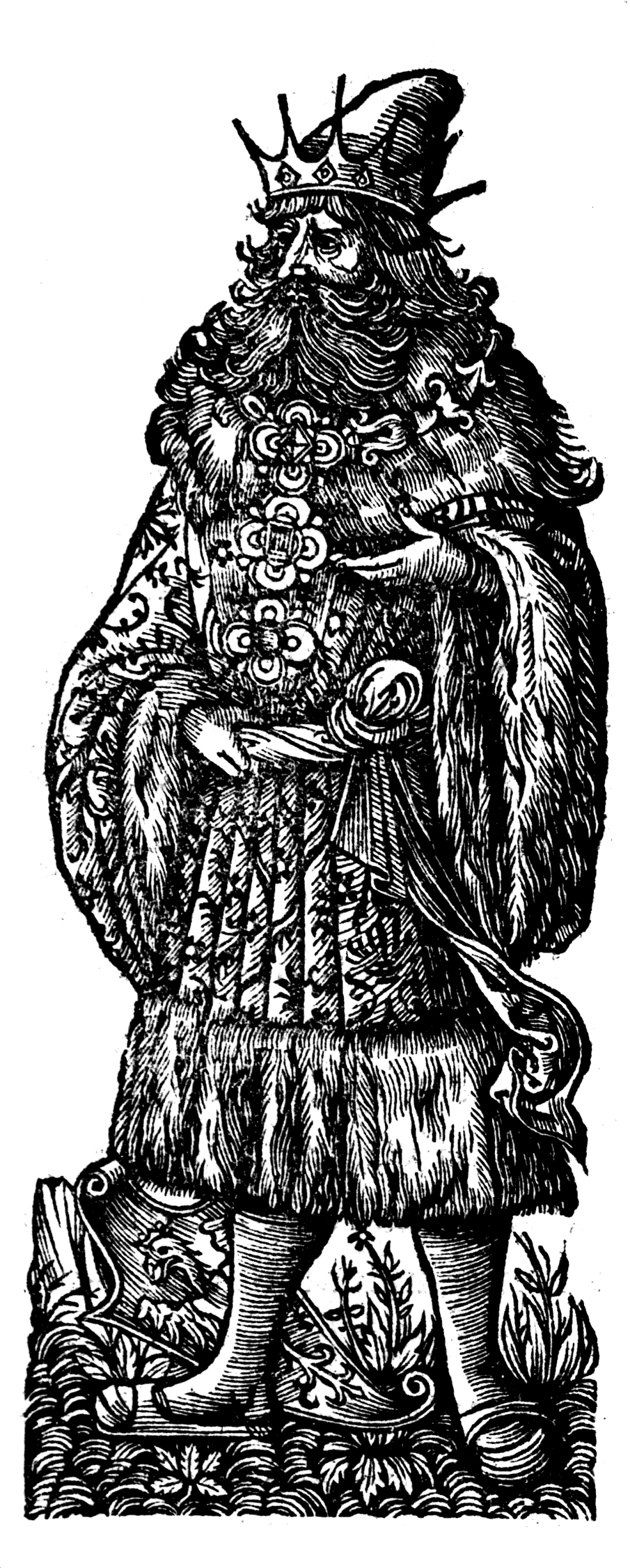
Krakus from Chronica Polonorum

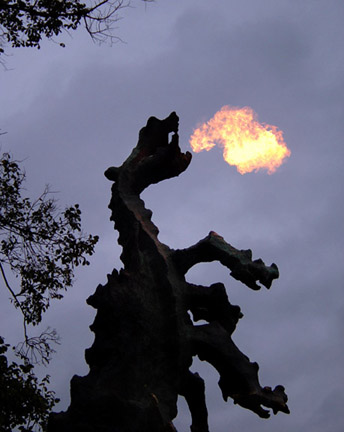
Fire-breathing Smok Wawelski below Wawel Castle, slain in Krakus' days

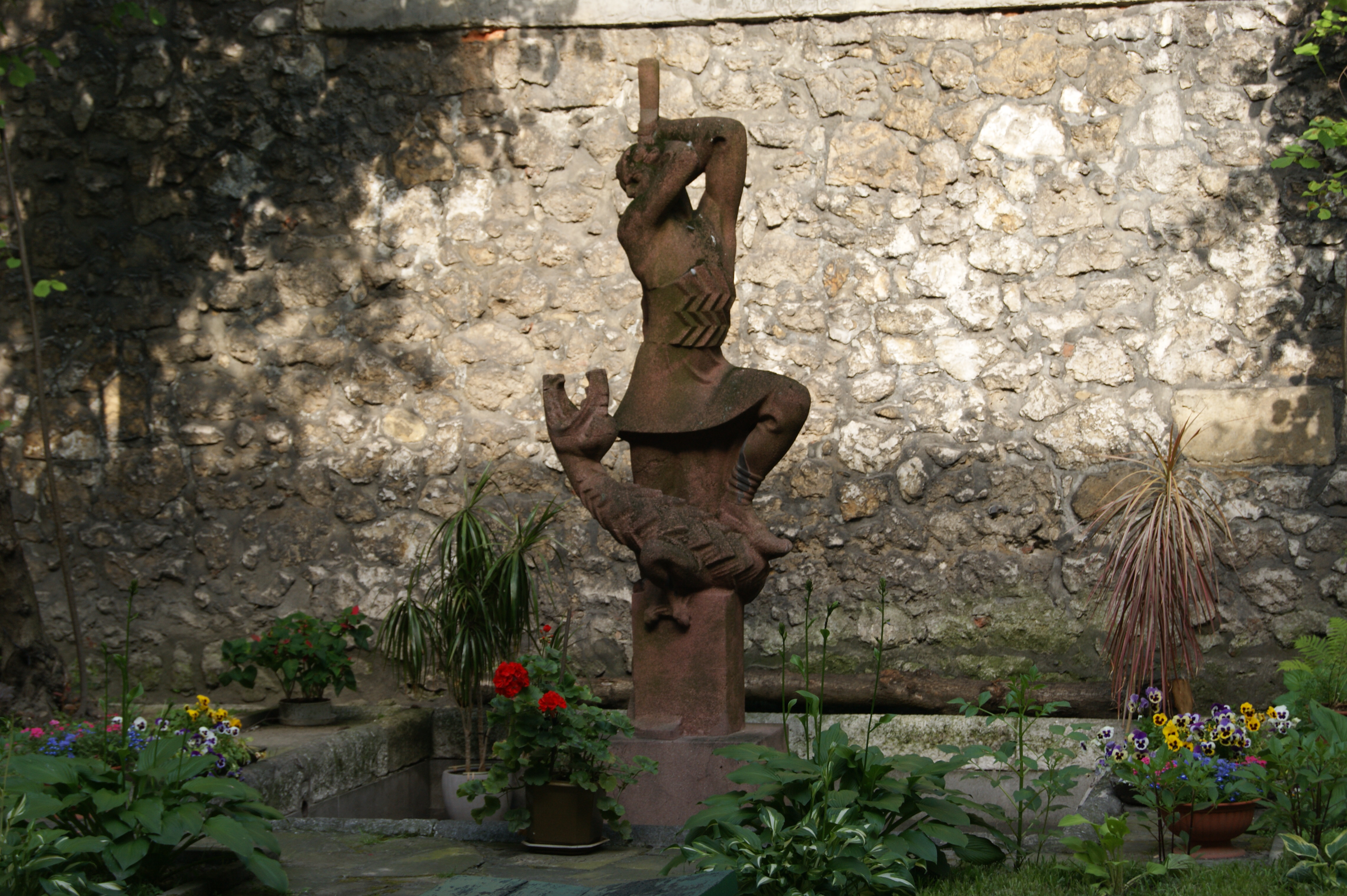
Krakus and Dragon statue, 1929, in Old Town Kraków

== Bibliography ==
- Morys-Twarowski, Michael (2023). Barbarica. Tysiąc lat zapomnianej historii ziem polskich (in Polish). Znak Horyzont. ISBN 978-83-240-8878-2.
