= Bronisław Chromy =

Polish sculptor (1925–2017)

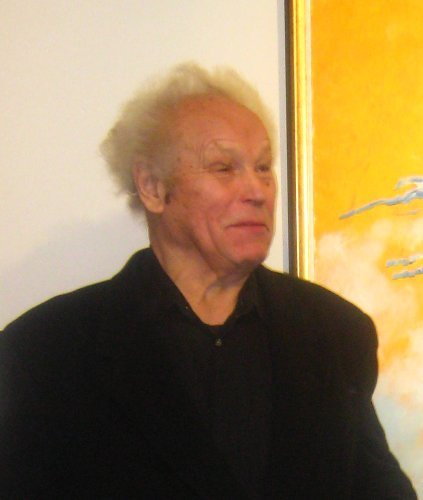
- Born: 3 June 1925; Leńcze, Poland
- Died: 4 October 2017 (aged 92); Kraków, Poland
- Education: Jan Matejko Academy of Fine Arts
- Known for: Sculpture
- Movement: Neo-expressionism

Bronisław Chromy (3 June 1925 – 4 October 2017) was a Polish sculptor, medalist, painter, and draughtsman, and a professor at the Jan Matejko Academy of Fine Arts in Kraków.

Chromy was a Member of the Polish Academy of Learning. He was born at Leńcze near Lanckorona in 1925, he was educated at the Secondary School of Fine Arts and the Academy of Fine Arts in Kraków, graduating in 1956. He was a student of Xawery Dunikowski.

== Selected works ==
- Wawel Dragon statue
- Commemorative plaque, placed on the Długosz House
