= Wielkopolska Chronicle =

Polish anonymous medieval chronicle

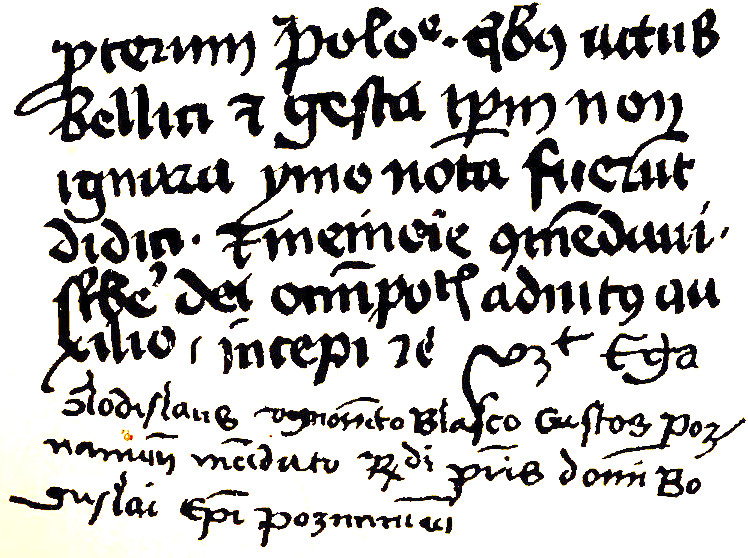
Wielkopolska Chronicle in the XV-century compilation Kodeks Sędziwoja, page 274.

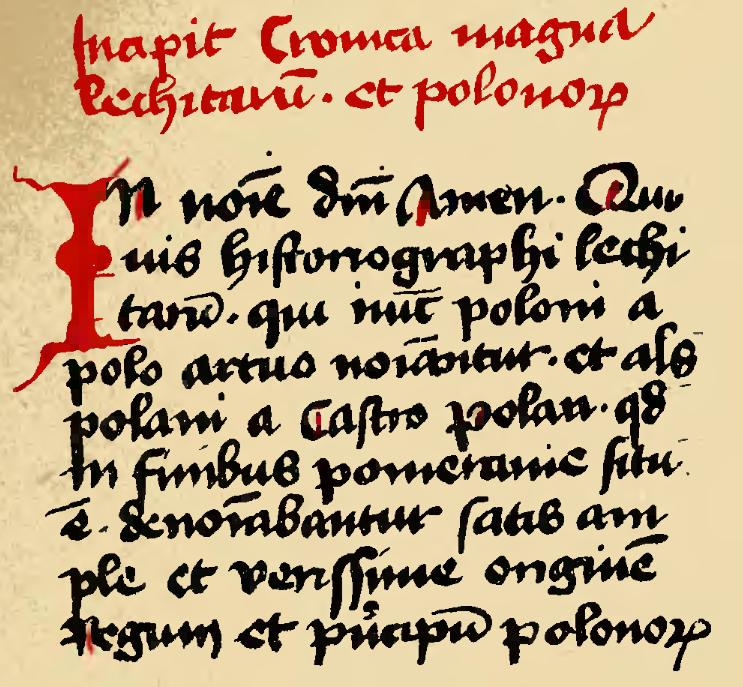
Start in Chronica magna, XV century copy.

The Wielkopolska Chronicle (or Chronicle of Greater Poland, Polish: Kronika wielkopolska) is an anonymous medieval chronicle describing the supposed history of Poland from legendary times up to the year 1273. It was written in Latin at the end of the 13th or the beginning of the 14th century.

== Origins and possible authorship ==
The chronicle was written from the point of view of the region of Wielkopolska (Greater Poland). Its actual title is unknown. In one of the remaining copies it's written down as Chronicum Poloniae and in another Annalia vestuste gentic Polonorum vel Kronice.

Some historians, such as Brygida Kürbis have argued that the first edition of the work was created between 1283 and 1296 and its author was the curator of the Poznań capitulary, Godzisław Baszko. A second edition was completed between 1377 and 1384, which is partly supported by inclusion of material supported by the Chronicle of Dzierzwa from the beginning of 14th century. Others, like Jan Dąbrowski, have posited that the entire chronicle was written by Jan of Czarnków in the second half of the 14th century.

There are nine existing manuscripts, including a Great Chronicle copy which contains a collection of historical sources collected in Wielkopolska at the end of the 14th century.

The purpose of the author was to record the history of the rulers of Poland. The chronicle covers mythical events from pre-history up to the year 1271/72, and in two additions the year 1273. As a source, stylistically the chronicle is composed of two parts. The first, going up to the year 1202 is based on the Chronica Polonorum of Wincenty Kadłubek. The second part, written more in the style of annals is based on yearly records of Capitularies of Gniezno and Poznań. Other sources used by the author most likely include the lost Annales Polonorum historiae, church archives, and Vita s. Stanislai, Vita maior (Life of Saint Stanisław) of Wincenty of Kielcza. The introduction to the work has survived in two editions of the manuscript. One of these was written in 1295/1296 (it mentions Przemysł II as the current ruler). The other, more extensive one, was most likely created in the 14th century.

The chronicle was translated into Polish in 1965 by Kazimierz Abgarowicz.

== Purpose ==
The chronicle can be seen as a gesta ducum, a composition whose purpose is to celebrate the deeds of princes and kings. The central figures of the work are the Piast rulers of Wielkoposka, Przemysł I and Przemysł II. Przemysł I is presented as an ideal of a ruler who combines knightly valor (engaging himself only in defensive wars) with religious values (Christian humility and devotion). Other ideal rulers presented in the chronicle include other Polish kings and dukes, including Bolesław II the Generous (before the murder of Saint Stanisław) and Bolesław III Wrymouth.

== Contents ==
Among other stories, legends, and historical narratives, the Wielkopolska Chronicle contains the first recorded version of the legend of Lech, Czech, and Rus, as well as a Polish version of the story of Waldere and Hildegyth (also Waltharius), a popular tale of medieval Europe, transplanted onto Polish soil.
