= Lech II =

Slavic founding legend

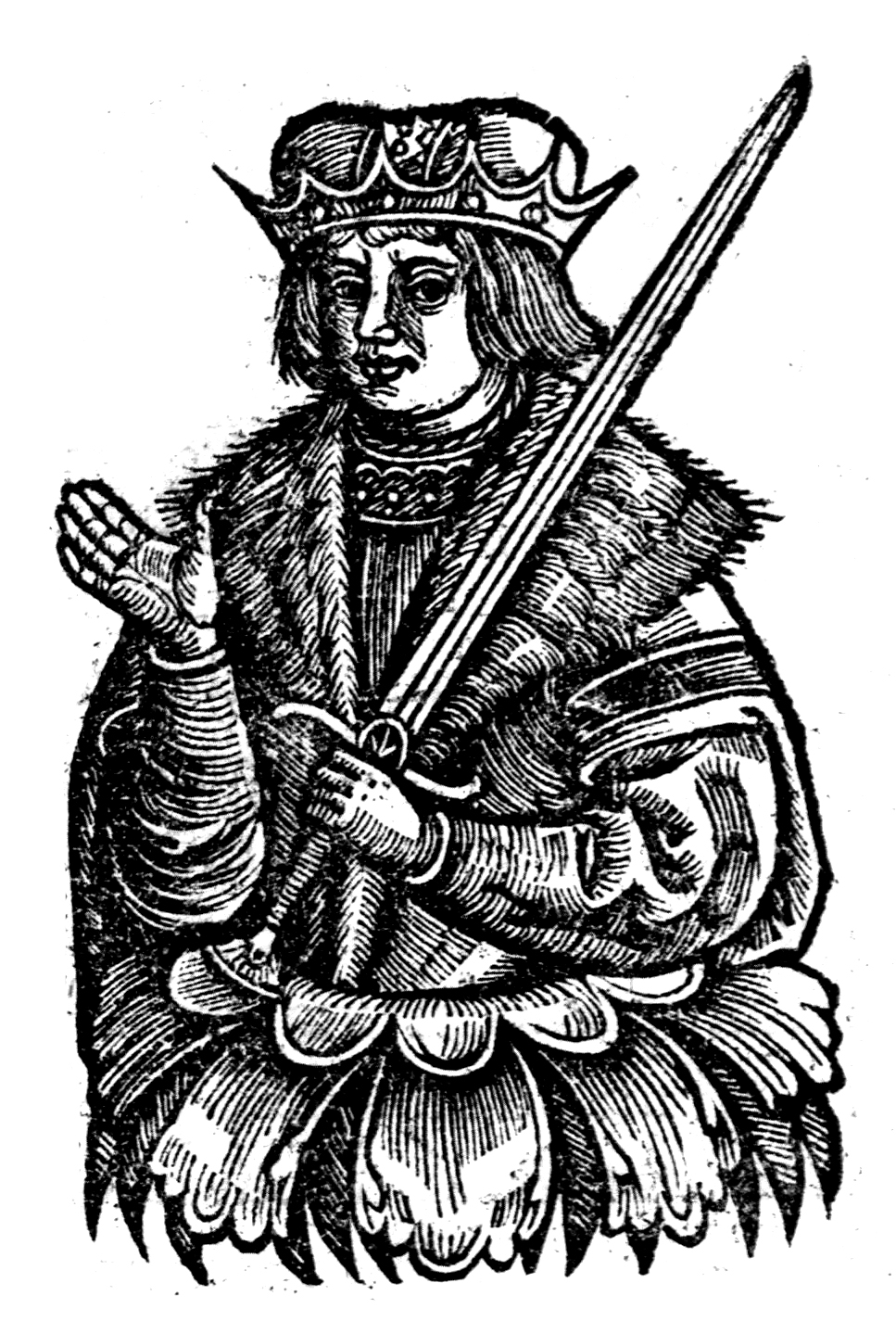
Lech II

Lech II was a legendary ruler of Poland mentioned by 15th century chronicler Jan Długosz. He was the son of the alleged founder of the City of Kraków, Krakus, and he was the brother of Krakus II.

== Bibliography ==
- Jan Długosz, Roczniki, czyli kroniki sławnego Królestwa Polskiego, ks 1 - 2, Warszawa 1961, s. 191 - 192.
- Aleksander Semkowicz, Krytyczny rozbiór Dziejów Polski Jana Długosza (do roku 1384), Kraków 1887.
