= Nowa Huta. Okruchy życia i meandry historii =

2003 photo anthology

- 1st edition cover
- Author: Jerzy Aleksander Karnasiewicz
- Language: Polish
- Genre: Photo anthology
- Publisher: Wydawnictwo Towarzystwo Slowaków w Polsce, Kraków
- Publication date: 2003
- Publication place: Poland
- Media type: Print Hardcover
- Pages: 195
- ISBN: 83-89186-67-5

The Nowa Huta. Okruchy życia i meandry historii (English: Nowa Huta. Crumbs of Life and the Meanders of History) is a 2003 photo anthology compiled by Jerzy Aleksander Karnasiewicz and illustrated with photographs of Nowa Huta district of Kraków, Poland; which were taken in its early days, and between 1979-2003. The book, published bilingually in Polish and English, contains essays, sociological dissertations, poetry and the homilies of future Pope John Paul II given during his visits to Nowa Huta. The anthology was unveiled by the president of Kraków, prof. Jacek Majchrowski on October 14, 2003, with the honorary patronage of Cardinal Franciszek Macharski.

== Significance ==
Nowa Huta was to become a model socialist city for Stalinist propaganda. Following the establishing of the People's Republic of Poland, the Communist authorities commenced building a satellite industrial town near Kraków. The adjoining Vladimir Lenin Steelworks began operations on July 22, 1954. The new city was constructed entirely according to a new doctrine of Socialist realism in Poland. Its central avenue featured a countrywide-known statue of Vladimir Lenin.

However, as early as in 1960, inhabitants of Nowa Huta began fighting for permit to build a church. In that year, violent street-fights erupted over a wooden cross, erected by the locals who were supported by Bishop Karol Wojtyła. In the 1980s Nowa Huta became a place of demonstrations and violent street protests of the Solidarity movement, fought by the police. It was one of the most important centers of antiCommunist resistance, with numerous strike actions.

The book follows this sociological phenomenon across several decades from its heyday until the fall of Communism, and its aftermath; presenting the town's former political role and its subsequent decline in new sovereign Poland. "There is an apparent paradox in Nowa Huta now being characterised as a place of insecurity, declining mobility and uncertainty, in contrast to its earlier characterisation as a place of opportunity and stability" ( – Alison Stenning, the Nowa Huta anthology).

== Major themes ==
The monument to the leader of the October Revolution was unveiled in Nowa Huta on April 28, 1973 in the avenue of Roses. It was a work of sculptor Marian Konieczny. The bronze monument depicted Lenin marching forward, to symbolize his eternally vivid ideas. The cast – made by the steelworks - was very expensive, resulting in the workers' annual bonuses and their three-month premiums being cut by the conglomerate. From the beginning the inhabitants didn't accept the presence of this gigantic statue. On the night of April 18, 1979 at around 3 a.m., a secret attempt was made to blow it up. The blast had such enormous striking power, that the window panes from all apartment blocks around the monument were blown out. However the explosion didn't cause the intended effect. Lenin lost only a part of the right foot. The perpetrators of the assault were never found.

As envisioned by the Communist Party, Nowa Huta was the first town in Polish history deliberately built without a church. Already in 1959, Bishop Karol Wojtyła of Kraków – future Pope John Paul II – began an annual custom of celebrating Christmas Midnight Mass (Pasterka) there in an open field. The persistent pressure by the Catholics eventually succeeded, and in 1977 a church was erected. The anthology Nowa Huta features two homilies by the future Pope: one from his 1979 visit to nearby Mogiła and the other, from 1983, given during his consecration of the church he fought for.

Professor Alison Stenning came to Nowa Huta in 2000 on a two-year research project from the University of Birmingham to document the impact of the collapse of Communism in Poland. As a socioeconomic geographer, she conducted interviews with the district inhabitants, and studies of the diminishing role of the local steelworks in their daily lives. The respondents were not chosen accidentally, among them the present and the former factory employees. Stenning wanted to learn, how the everyday life had changed in Nowa Huta under the conditions of post-Socialism. Karnasiewicz took part in her research project and in November 2002 attended a meeting with dr Stenning by members of the forum, at which she presented her report entitled "Living in the Spaces of Post-Socialism: the Case of Nowa Huta" ("Życie w przestrzeniach (post) socjalizmu: przypadek Nowej Huty"). Her material concerning the relation of the local community, the steel mill, and the work of municipal government was interesting enough to merit its publication in the anthology.

== Contributors ==
The book was conceived by an art photographer Jerzy Aleksander Karnasiewicz born in Tarnów, member of the Fotoklub of the Republic of Poland who has been taking photographs for over 28 years. He's also a member of the Kraków Photographic Club. Photo anthology Nowa Huta features some archival, as well as street photographs and psychological portraits taken by Karnasiewicz at the height of his artistic career.

Also featured is an essay by Prof. Ryszard Terlecki, historian and publicist, who presented an historical overview of the city, written from the European perspective, and entitled "Pół wieku z widokiem na Nową Hutę" (Half a Century with the Outlook on Nowa Huta). Meanwhile, Father Niward Karsznia from the 13th century Cistercian monastery in nearby Mogiła, writes about the order of Cistercian monks which he joined in 1948 in Nowa Huta. He arrived at Mogiła from Czarnolas. At that time, the monks led a contemplative lifestyle, focused on prayer and work. Everything changed, when the construction of steelworks encroached on their requisitioned monastic fields.

The book features poems by two authors connected with the city, Barbara Urbańska, and Ryszard Tylman. Tylman's long poem about the nighttime assault on the statue of Lenin, published in his book Koty marcowe, is illustrated with black and white photographs of the damaged monument, taken by Karnasiewicz secretly the following morning. The poems by Urbańska come from her book Podnoszę z ziemi przez uszanowanie describing Nowa Huta during the martial law in Poland.

Prof. Alison Stenning, who's a British socioeconomic geographer, spent ten months in Nowa Huta from November 2000 to September 2001. Her project sponsored by the University of Birmingham, resulted in a more grounded understanding of post-Socialism. It was conducted in close cooperation with the Institute of Geography of the Jagiellonian University in Kraków. Her paper featured in the Nowa Huta anthology was also published in academic journals in the UK and Poland.

== See also ==
- History of Poland (1945-1989)
- Districts of Kraków
- Andrzej Wajda film Man of Marble (Polish: Człowiek z marmuru), about a bricklayer who built the socialist Nowa Huta
- Głos - Tygodnik Nowohucki

== Notes and references ==
- Stenning, A. (2003) "Zycie w przestrzeniach (post)socjalizmu: przypadek Nowej Huty" (English: Life in the spaces of (post)socialism: the case of Nowa Huta). For background to this publication, see NaszeMiasto.pl #1856
- NaszeMiasto.pl Kraków: "Nowa Huta. Okruchy życia i meandry historii", Polskapresse
- Księgarnia fotograficzna F5: Nowa Huta. Okruchy życia i meandry historii, teksty
- Jerzy Aleksander Karnasiewicz, Nowa Huta Okruchy życia i meandry historii at Focus.pl (publishers info)
- Marta Sinior, "Nowa Huta w fotografii Jerzego Aleksandra Karnasiewicza" Fotopolis.pl 2005-12-22
- Marta Majewska, Wystawy festiwalowe, Magazine Fotopolis.pl 2003-10-23
