= Stenning =

Stenning may refer to:

- Alison Stenning, British geographer and academic
- Emma Stenning (born 1975), British arts professional
- Ernest Stenning (1885–1964), English Anglican priest
- Henry Stenning (1889–1971), English socialist and translator
- John Stenning (1868–1959), English Semiticist, academic, and British Army officer
- Keith Stenning, British cognitive scientist
- Paul Stenning (born 1976), English author, poet, interviewer, and ghostwriter
- Stephen Stenning, Scottish arts director

== See also ==
- Steyning, a town in West Sussex, England, pronounced "Stenning"
