= Church of Our Lady Queen of Poland, Kraków =

Roman Catholic church in Krakow, Poland

Church of Our Lady Queen of Poland
- Kościół Matki Bożej Królowej Polski
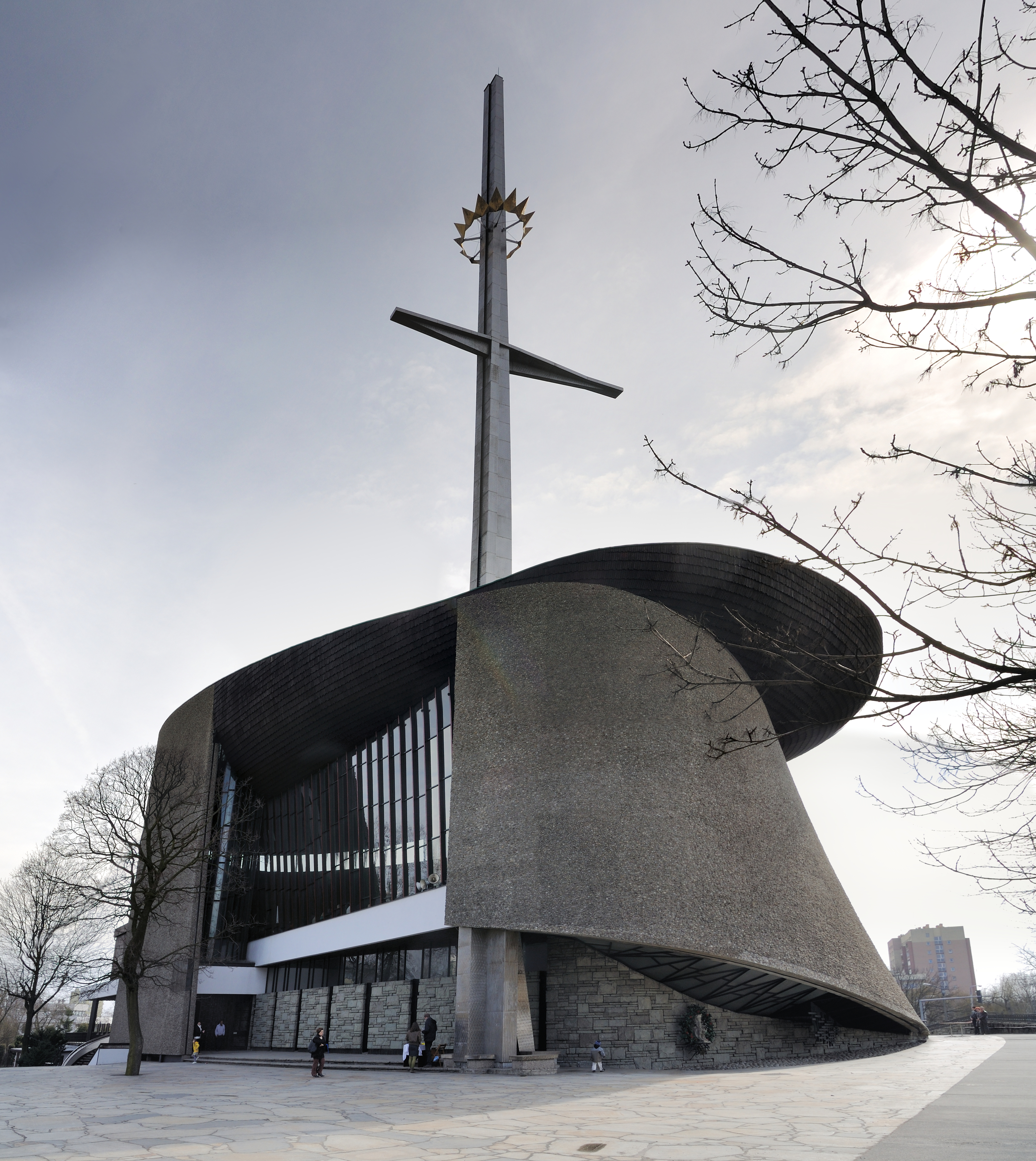
- View from the southwest
- Church of Our Lady Queen of Poland
- Location: Nowa Huta
- Address: 1 Obrońców Krzyża Street; Kraków
- Country: Poland
- Denomination: Roman Catholic
- Website: https://arkapana.pl/

History
- Consecrated: May 15, 1977

The Church of Our Lady Queen of Poland (Polish: Kościół Matki Bożej Królowej Polski), known colloquially as The Ark of the Lord Church (Polish: Kościół Arka Pana) is a historic Roman Catholic parish church located at 1 Obrońców Krzyża Street in Nowa Huta, the former district of Kraków, Poland.

Built between 1967 and 1977, it was the first new church to be built in Nowa Huta.

== History ==
As early as 1952 local residents formed a parish and started lobbying for permission to build a church but the Communist government would not grant building permits or allocate any land for the building. In 1956 residents delivered two petitions advocating for the building to local authorities and permission was granted. In 1957 they placed a wooden cross near Plac Teatralny (Theater Square) to mark the location of the future church. In October 1959 authorities withdrew the building permission and the land was taken back. This led to community protest by the residents of Nowa Huta and on April 27, 1960 when authorities came to remove the wooden cross the 1960 Nowa Huta protests broke out that were met with violence from the militia.

In 1965 a new location was finally secured which is credited to the intervention of then metropolitan bishop, Karol Wojtyła (who would later become Pope John Paul II). Designed by architect Wojciech Pietrzyk in 1965 and construction began on the new building in 1967. Due to political restrictions construction was primarily carried out by volunteers, with no assistance from the government over 9 years. On May 18, 1969, the Archbishop of Kraków, Cardinal Karol Wojtyła, laid the cornerstone from St. Peter's Basilica in the Vatican and consecrated by Pope Paul VI. On May 15, 1977, Cardinal Karol Wojtyła consecrated the church, giving it the name of Our Lady Queen of Poland.

During the 1980s martial law, period, the church became a focal point for anti-communist resistance. Monthly masses held there often turned into protests, and the site saw events like the death of Bogdan Włosik, a young protester shot by security forces in 1982. In 1992 a monument was erected on the site commemorating his death.

== Church ==
The exterior, with its large sloping roof and 70 metres (230 ft) mast in the shape of a crowned cross, was a reference to Noah's Ark. In architectural terms, the church is a good example of the late modernist style in Poland, and is considered a reference to the Notre-Dame du Haut chapel in Ronchamp, France designed by Le Corbusier a decade earlier.

The church is laid out over 3 levels. The main nave dominated by the 8 metres (26 ft) tall crucifix created by Bronisław Chromy.

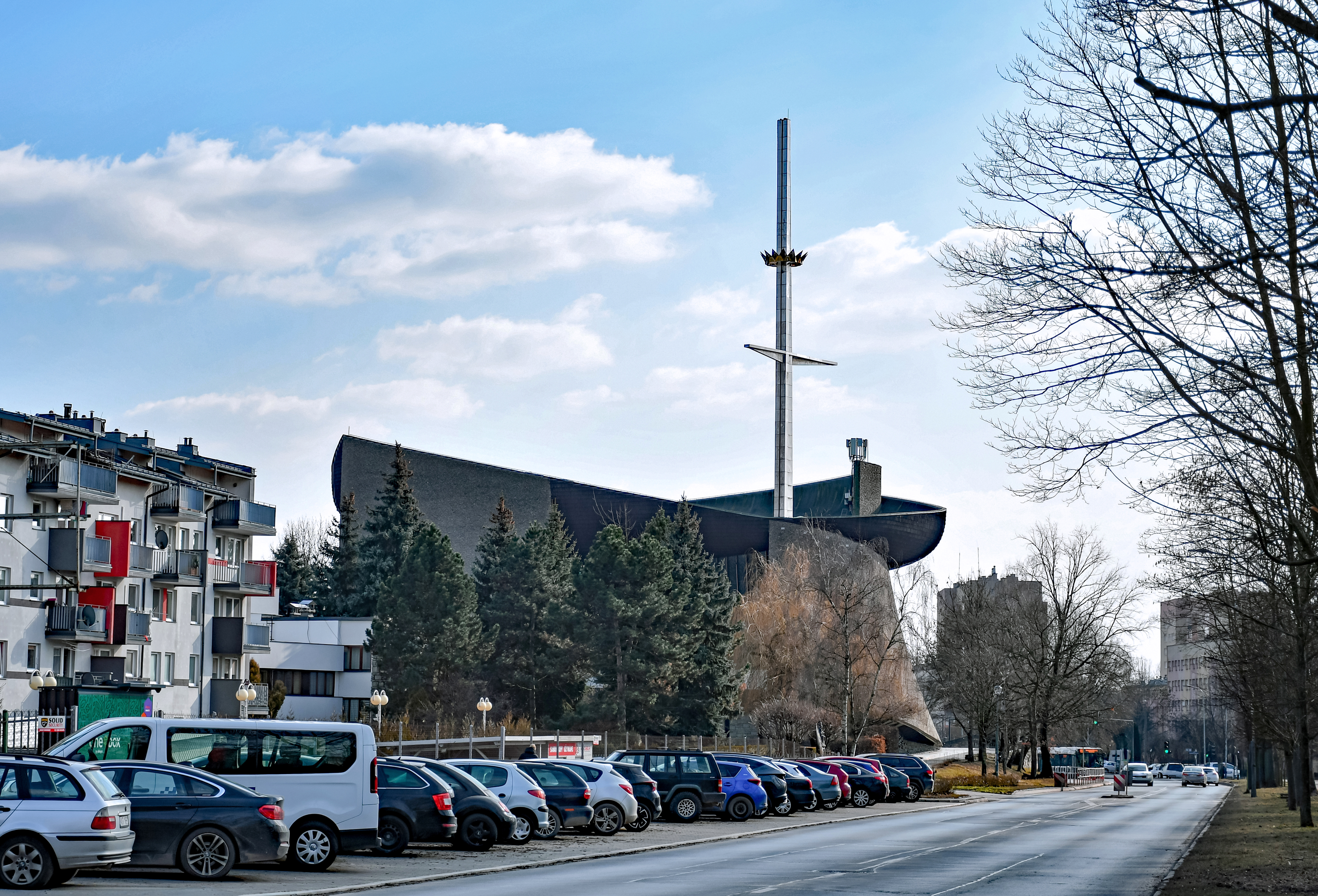
The Ark of the Lord.
Roof-ark, cross-mast of a boat.
View from the north.

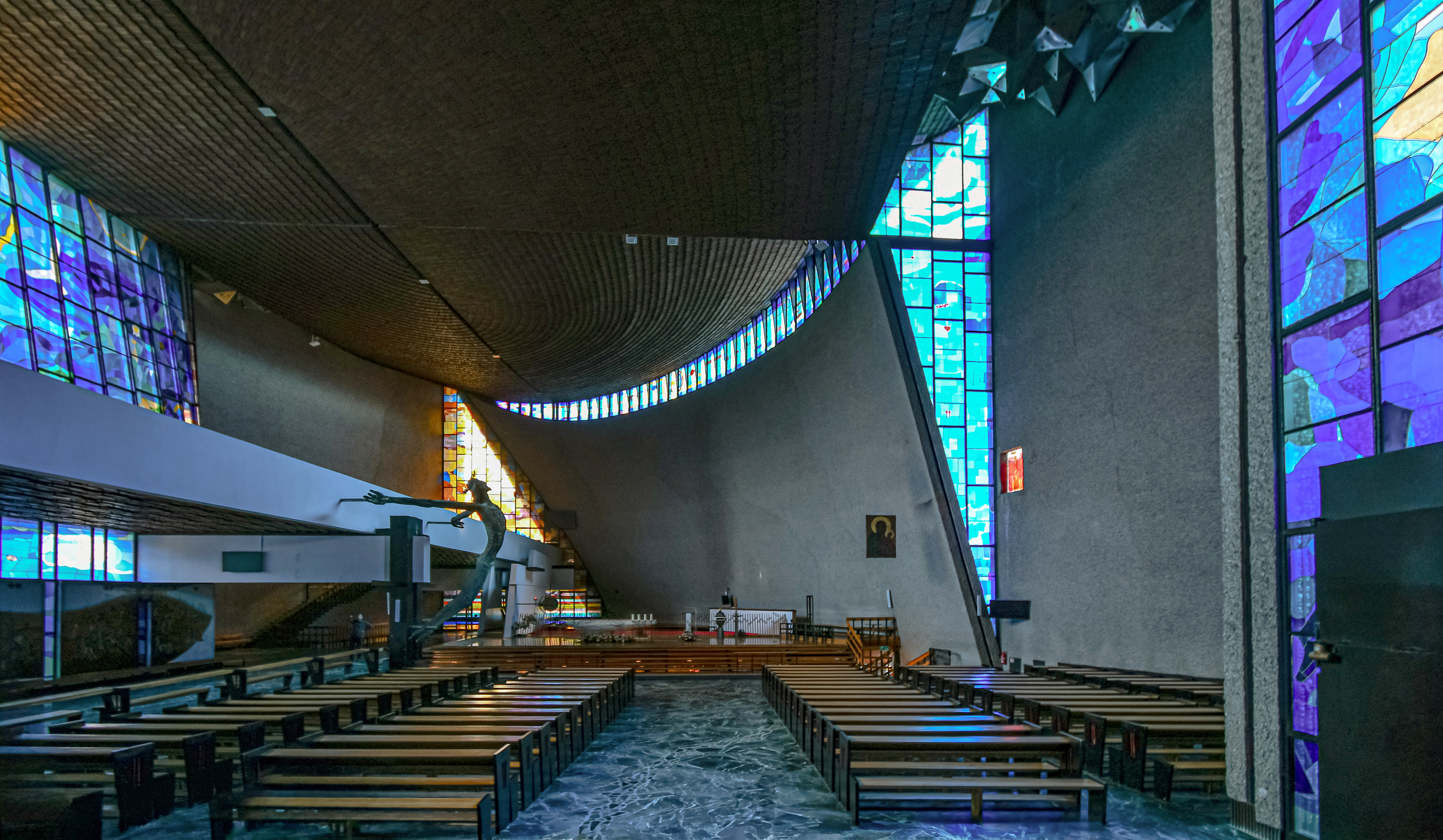
View of the interior with Bronisław Chromy's crucifix on the left.
