= Przylasek Rusiecki =

- Neighbourhood of Kraków
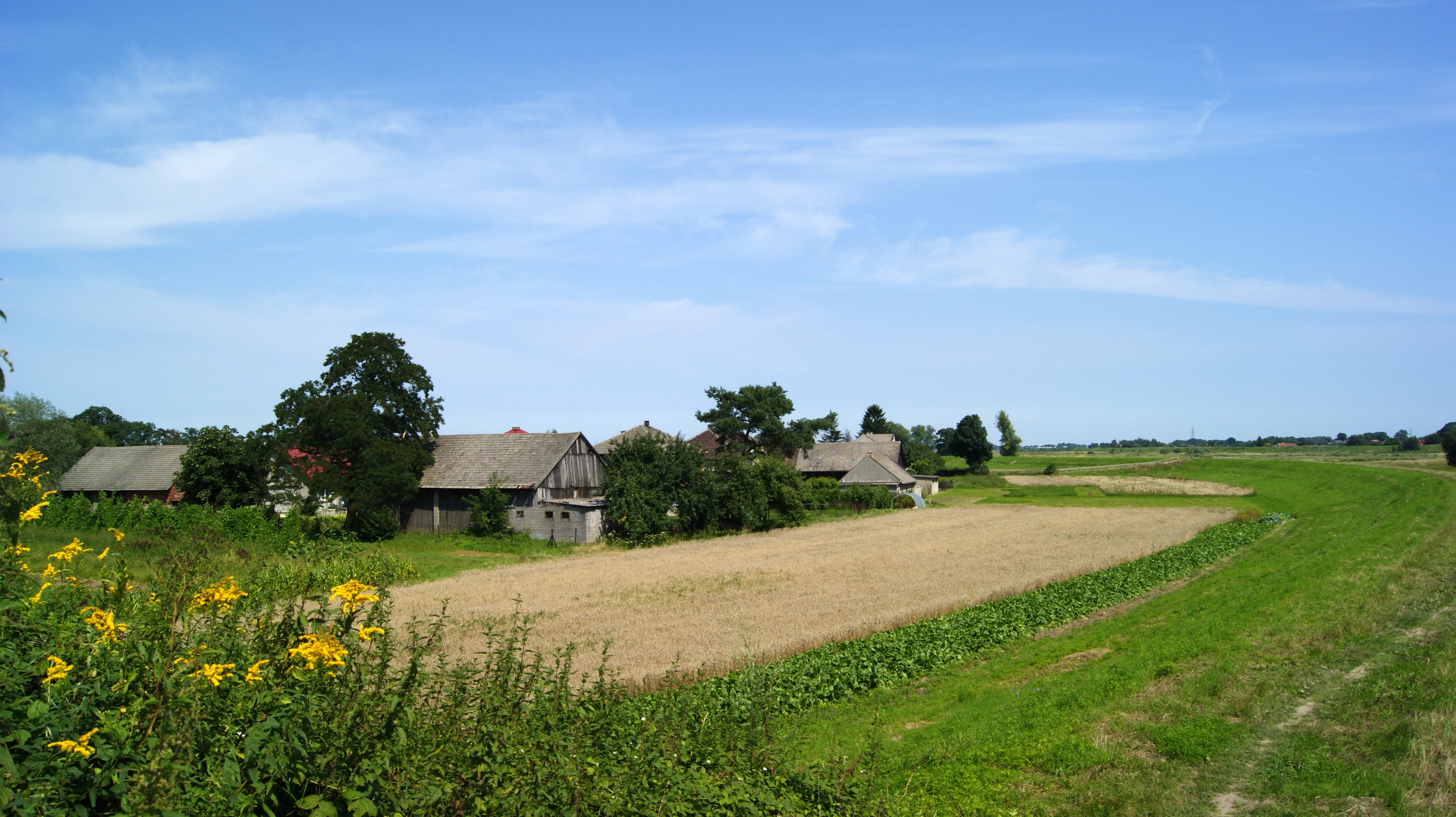
- View from the south
- Interactive map of Przylasek Rusiecki
- Coordinates: 50°03′13″N 20°09′06″E
- Country: Poland
- Voivodeship: Lesser Poland
- County: Kraków County
- City: Kraków

Przylasek Rusiecki, originally a village near Kraków (Poland), is a part of Kraków's Nowa Huta district since 1973.

The village was established on the site of a cleared forest belonging to the Ruszcza village. The first records of the existence of the settlement called Las Rusiecki date back to 1782. Over the centuries, it was successively owned by the Branicki, Badeni, and Popiel families. On 1 January 1973, the village was incorporated into Kraków.

Przylasek Rusiecki features several water reservoirs formed after flooding gravel pit excavations. One of them has a beach with a swimming area, modernized in 2021, while the others are designated for fishing.
