= Kraków Speedway Stadium =

Stadium in Kraków, Poland

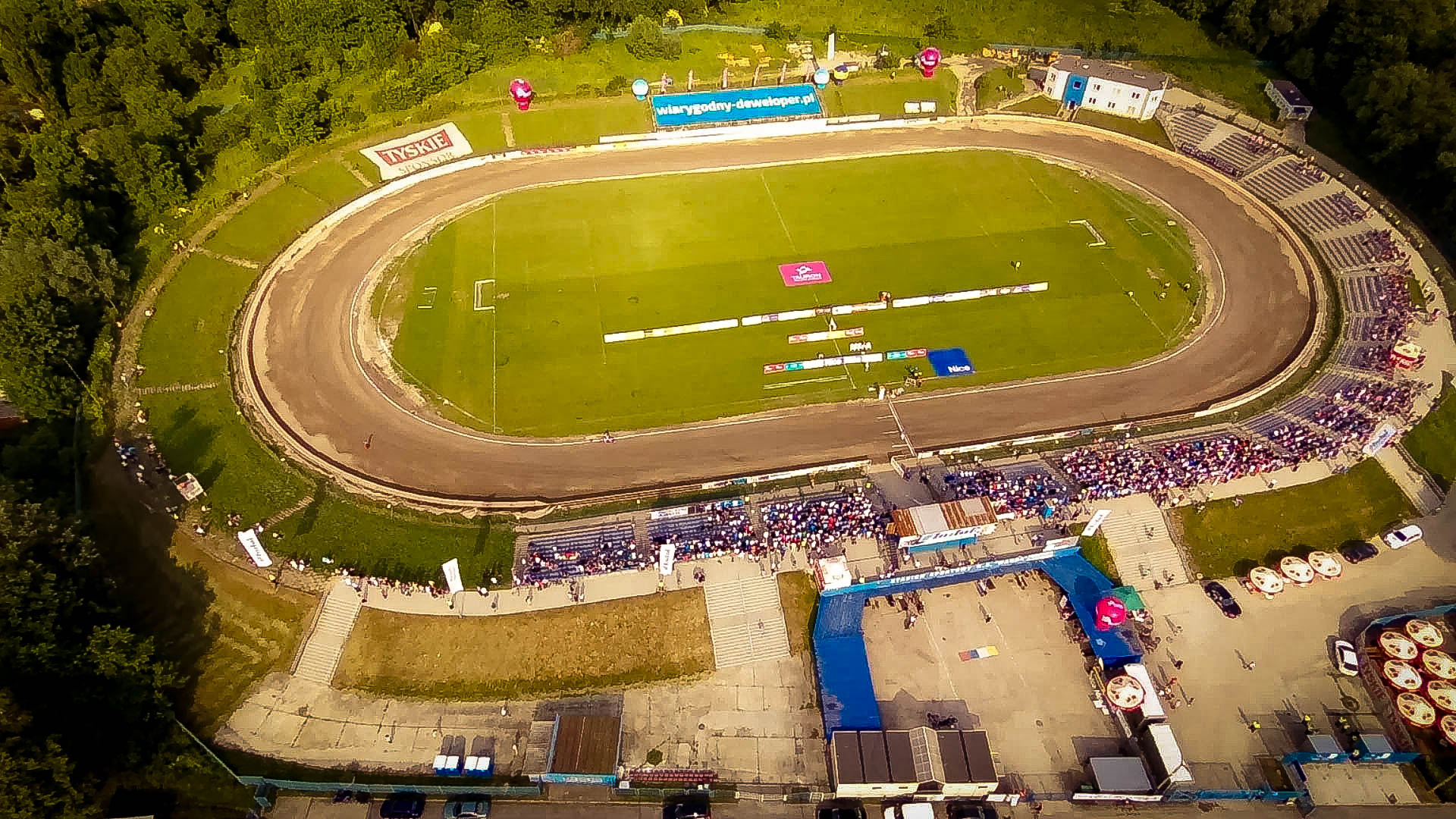
- The Stadium in 2014
- Location: Odmogile, 30-962 Kraków, Poland
- Coordinates: 50°05′04″N 20°02′45″E
- Capacity: 12,000
- Opened: 1957
- Length: 0.389 km (0.242 mi)

The Kraków Speedway Stadium or Stadion Sportowy KS Wanda is a 12,000-capacity motorcycle speedway stadium in Kraków, Poland. The location of the stadium is in the north east district of Nowa Huta on the Odmogile road. The venue was used by the Kraków Speedway team, who competed in the Team Speedway Polish Championship until 2019.

== History ==
The stadium was purpose-built for motorcycle speedway in 1957 and was one of the first to install floodlights. On 9 July 1959, the stadium hosted an international match between Poland and Austria.

On 11 October 1960, Poland hosted England in an international match that attracted a record crowd of 25,000. This was followed by being selected as a qualifying venue for the 1964 Speedway World Team Cup.

In 1965, the speedway team folded and the stadium remained empty for 28 years.

The stadium deteriorated during the 28 period with only the football pitch inside the track being used. However, in 1993, the stadium underwent renovation with six central sections of the west stand rebuilt. This was followed by further renovations on the east stand in 2009 and on the track itself in 2014 and 2016 respectively.

In 2017, the stadium became an all-seated stadium.

== Track Records ==
1957-1965 (403 m)

- 87.0 sec. Zygmuntowski, 20 October 1957
- 85.7 sec. Zdzisław Zachara, 27 October 1957
- 84.0 sec. Bogdan Jaroszewicz, 20 April 1958
- 83.5 sec. Bogdan Jaroszewicz, 30 March 1959
- 83.0 sec. Zygmunt Pytko, 6 April 1959
- 82.5 sec. Bogdan Jaroszewicz, 11 October 1959
- 81.9 sec. Florian Kapała, 25 October 1959
- 78.1 sec. Peter Craven 8 November 1960

1993-2005 (396 m)

- 72.0 sec. Antonín Kasper Sr., 12 April 1993
- 70.9 sec. Antonín Kasper Sr., 2 April 1995
- 70.8 sec. Zenon Kasprzak, 21 April 1996
- 70.2 sec. Zoltán Adorján, 29 September 1996
- 70.1 sec. Robert Dados, 6 May 1997
- 69.6 sec. Sergei Darkin, 23 May 1999

2009-2019 (389.5 m)

- 67.00 sec. Emil Sayfutdinov, 23 August 2009
- 66.00 sec. Janusz Kołodziej, 3O October 2010
- 65.94 sec. Andrzej Lebedev, 26 April 2015
- 64.98 sec. Andriy Karpov, 26 April 2015

== Gallery ==
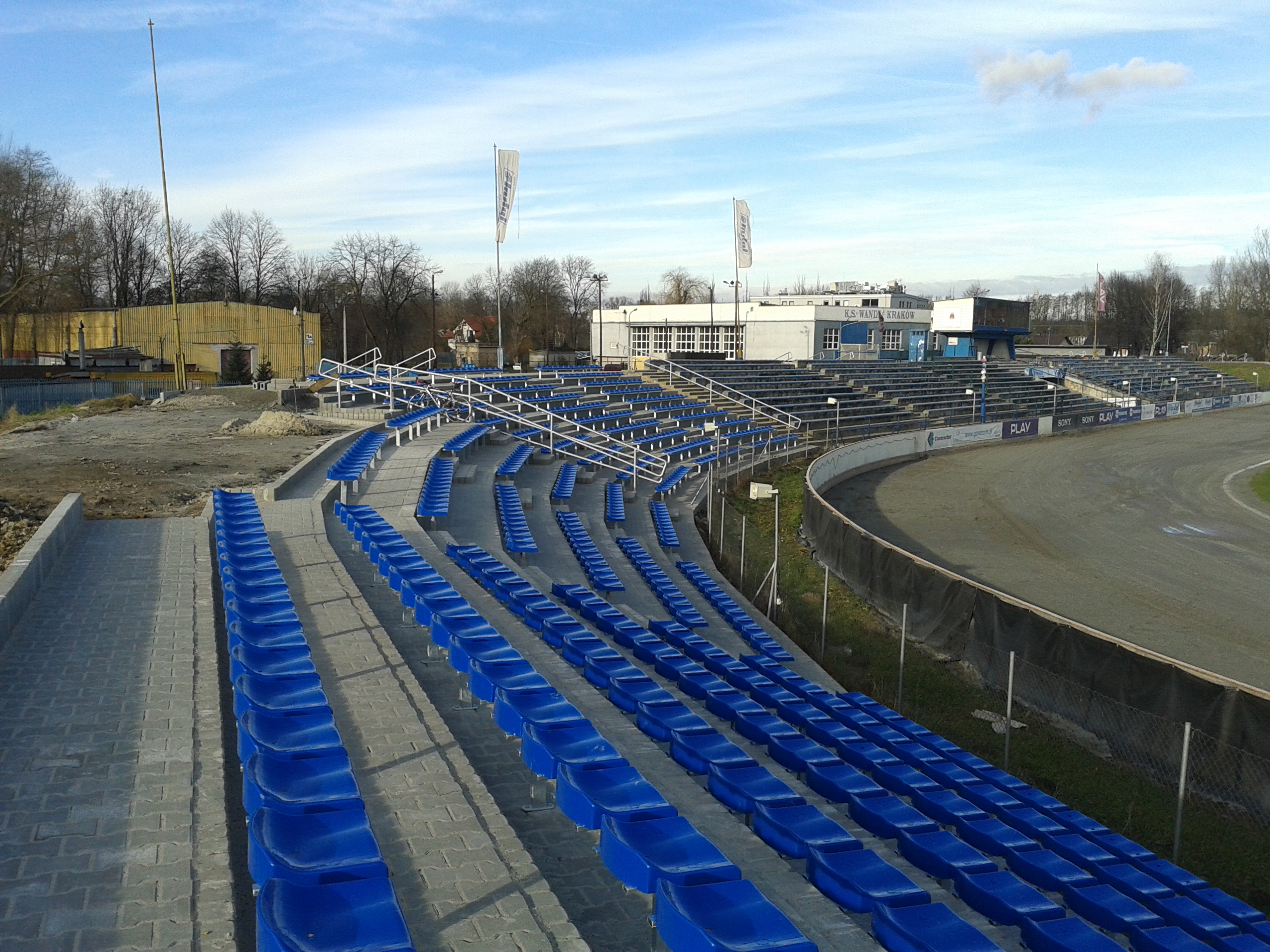
The stadium in 2014

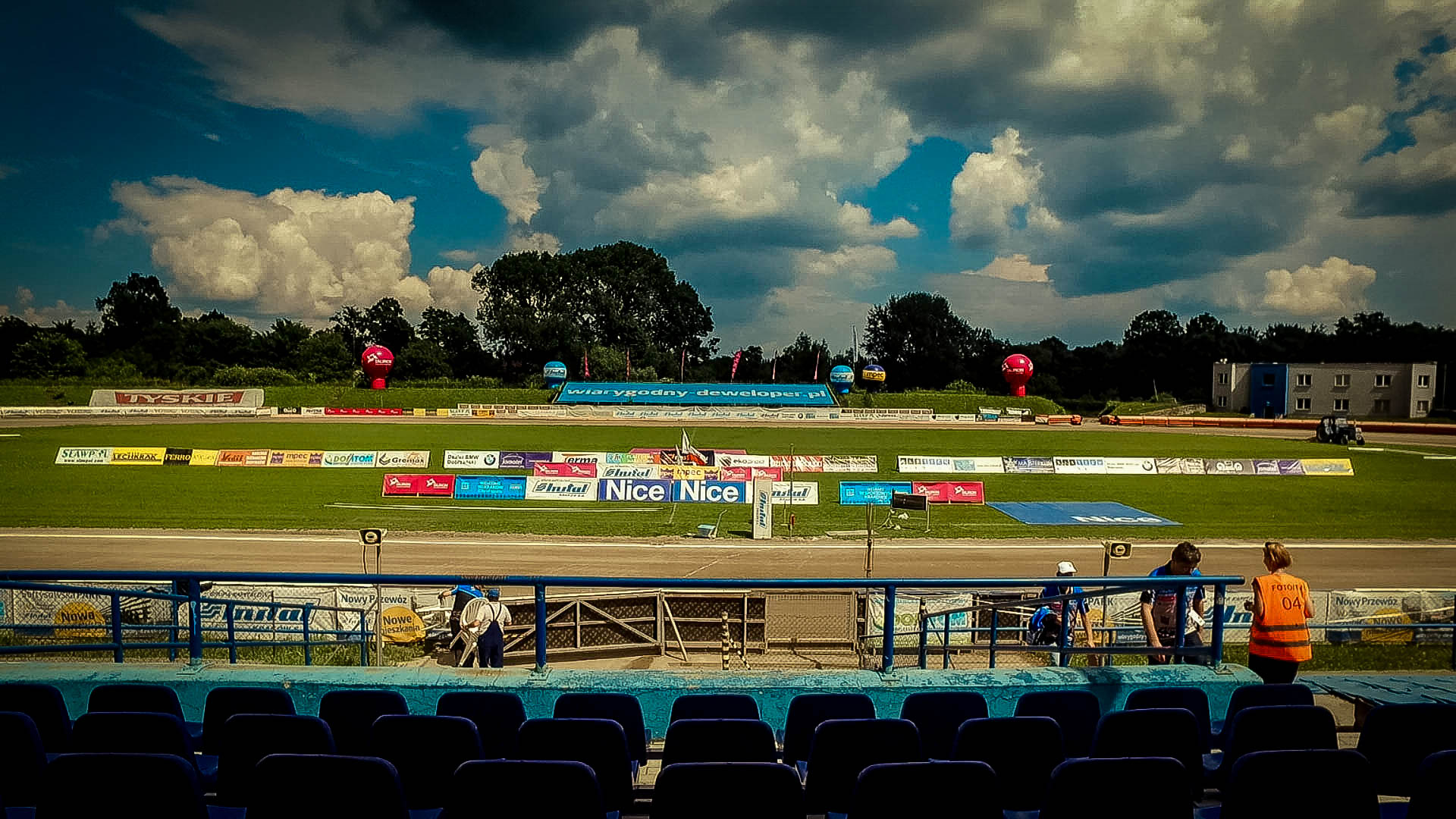
The arena in 2016

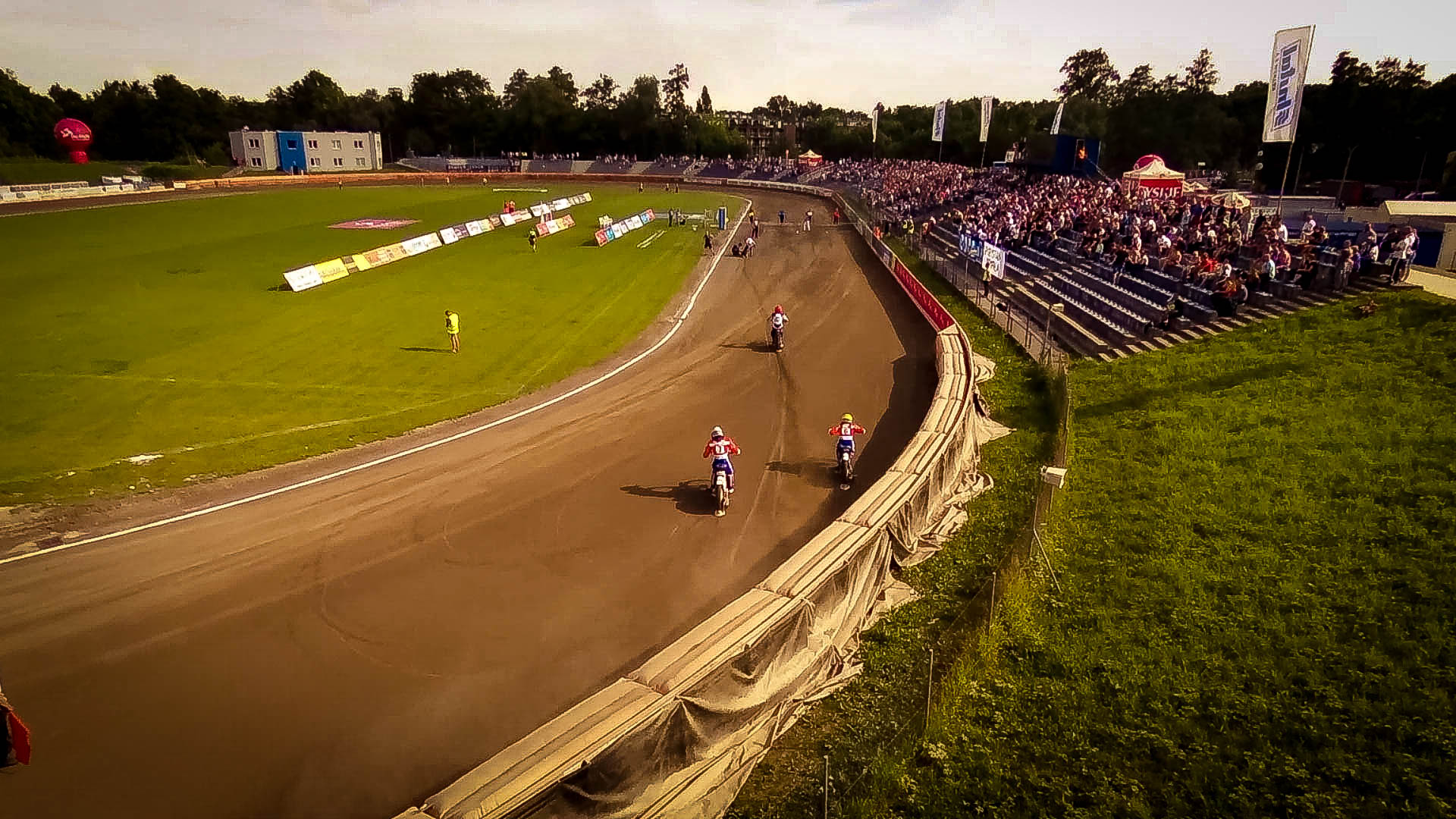
Riders warming up in 2016
