= Głos – Tygodnik Nowohucki =

- Głos – Tygodnik Nowohucki, logo
- Type: Weekly magazine
- Format: Tabloid
- Owner(s): Graf-Press, sp. z o.o. Kraków
- Publisher: Graf-Press Publishing
- Editor-in-chief: Jan Franczyk
- Founded: 1957
- Language: Polish
- Headquarters: Kraków, Poland
- Circulation: 18,000, four times per month
- Price: zl 1.5
- Website: www.glos-tn.krakow.pl

The Głos – Tygodnik Nowohucki is a weekly magazine published in Kraków, Poland, focused on regional news concerning the largest and most populous city district of Nowa Huta. It features weekly editorials about politics, economy, culture, history of the city and the arts. Głos (The Voice) is published in color by Graf-Press media group in a tabloid format and sold each Wednesday with the local distribution of 18,000 copies. It can be purchased in kiosks and other commercial outlets for 1.5 zloty. Its main source of revenue is advertising. The editor-in-chief of Głos is Jan Franczyk.

== History ==
Between 1957 and 1991, the Głos magazine – established in 1957 – was owned by the Lenin Steelworks (since renamed to Tadeusz Sendzimir Steelworks), now owned by ArcelorMittal. In 1991 the Głos weekly was privatized, and its name changed from Głos Nowej Huty to Głos – Tygodnik Nowohucki. Currently the magazine is no longer subsidized, although the steelworks and the district authorities often purchase up to several pages in order to present their own information and advertise new employment opportunities for thousands of prospective factory workers. Following the collapse of communism the weekly Głos begun publishing articles on religion for the first time. It produced a series of stories on the local Mogiła Abbey, a Gothic monastery of the Cistercians erected in the 13th century in Nowa Huta (formerly, village of Mogiła), which appeared in the years 1998, 1999 and 2000.

Since 2006 the Głos includes a supplement published for the youth, and co-edited by students from the local high-schools under the direction of Agnieszka Żuchowicz and Tomasz Korczynski. The initiative is part of a program called Equal, connecting 16 secondary schools within the city district, and run by Partnerstwo Inicjatyw Nowohuckich society.
