= Alison Stenning =

British writer

- Education: University of Birmingham
- Known for: Geography and economy of the Eastern Bloc countries

Alison Stenning is a Professor of Social & Economic Geography at the Newcastle University, formerly lecturer in the Centre for Urban and Regional Development Studies in the School of Geography, Politics and Sociology there; as well as, at the School of Geography, Earth and Environmental Sciences, in the University of Birmingham (1996–2003), where she also served as an Associate Member at the Centre for Russian and East European Studies. Stenning is a social geographer with particular interests in the regional community and the economy of the (now defunct) Eastern Bloc countries once controlled by the Soviet Union. Stenning wrote extensively about the post-communist political economy of Poland's industrial hubs such as Nowa Huta.

Stenning graduated with BSc in Geography at the University of Birmingham in 1993, and with the MA in International Political Economy from the University of Newcastle in 1994. She defended her PhD in Geography at the University of Birmingham in 1998. Her work has been published in the European Urban and Regional Studies, in Antipode, in Work, Employment and Society and in Transactions of the Institute of British Geographers.

== Awards and honours ==
- She is the 2006 RGS-IBG Gill Memorial Award winner for contributions to eastern European geography.

== Bibliography ==
- Alison Stenning (2010), Domesticating neo-liberalism (with A. Smith, A. Rochovská, D. Świątek)
- Alison Stenning (2009), Economic geography under postcolonial scrutiny (with J. Pollard, C. McEwan, N. Laurie), Institute of British Geographers 34 (2)
- Alison Stenning (2009), Poles To Newcastle: Grounding New Migrant Flows in Peripheral Regions (with S. Dawley), European Urban and Regional Studies 16 (3)
- Alison Stenning (2008), History, Geography and Difference in the Post-socialist World: Or, Do We Still Need Post-Socialism? (with K. Hörschelmann), Antipode 40 (2)
- Alison Stenning (2008), The Emergence of a Working Poor: Labour Markets, Neoliberalisation and Diverse Economies in Post-Socialist Cities (with A. Smith, A. Rochovská, D. Świątek)
- Alison Stenning (2008), Ethnographies of postsocialist change (with K. Hörschelmann)
- Alison Stenning (2008), For working class geographies
- Alison Stenning (2008), Social justice and neoliberalism: global perspectives (with A. Smith, K. Willis)
- Alison Stenning (2006), Beyond household economies: articulations and spaces of economic practice in postsocialism (with A. Smith), Progress in Human Geography 30 (2)
- Alison Stenning (2006), Assessing the local and regional impacts of international migration (with T. Champion, C. Conway, M. Coombes, S. Dawley, L. Dixon), New Horizons Report to DCLG
- Alison Stenning (2006), ‘Out of Place’ in Auschwitz? Contested Development in Post-War and Post-Socialist Oświęcim (with A. Charlesworth, R. Guzik, M. Paszkowski), Ethics, Place & Environment 9 (2)
- Alison Stenning (2005), Post-socialism and the changing geographies of the everyday in Poland
- Alison Stenning (2005), Where is the Post-socialist Working Class?
- Alison Stenning (2005), Out there and in here: studying Eastern Europe in the West
- Alison Stenning (2005), Re-placing work
- Alison Stenning (2004), Urban change and the localities
- Alison Stenning (2003), Shaping the economic landscapes of postsocialism? Labour, workplace and community in Nowa Huta, Poland
- Alison Stenning (2000), The progress of transition in East Central Europe (with M. Bradshaw)
- Alison Stenning (2000), Placing (Post-) Socialism: The Making and Remaking of Nowa Huta, Poland
- Alison Stenning (1997), Economic restructuring and regional change in Russia (with M. Bradshaw, D. Sutherland)
