= Tadeusz Sendzimir Steelworks =

Steel plant in Kraków, Poland

Coordinates: 50°04′44″N 20°05′54″E

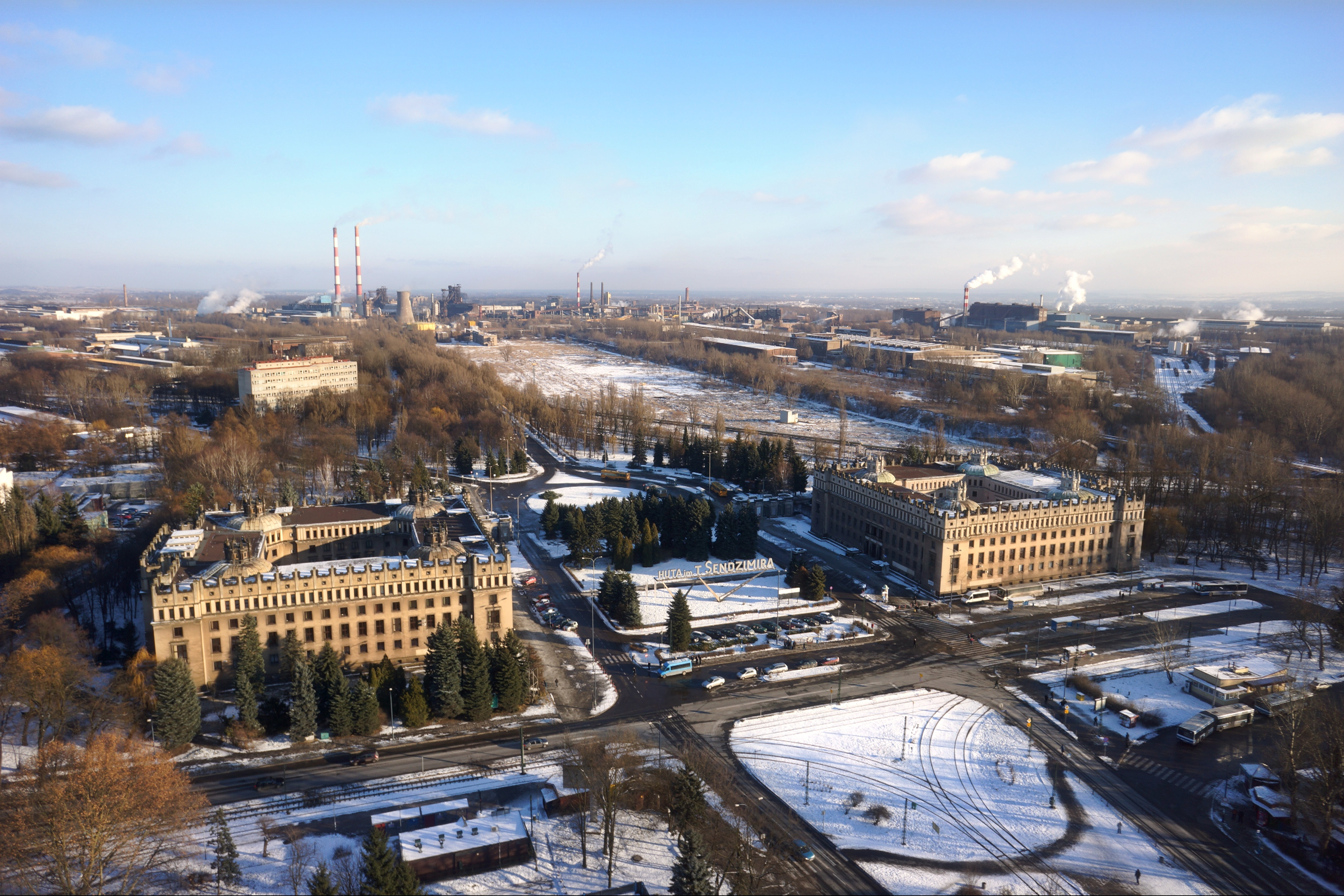
HTS Administration Center and the plantA sign, located near the main gate

Tadeusz Sendzimir Steelworks (Polish: Huta im. T. Sendzimira) is a steel plant the Nowa Huta district of Kraków, Poland. It is owned by ArcelorMittal Poland S.A. Oddział Kraków, a division of ArcelorMittal.

== History ==
The plant, then named Vladimir Lenin Steelworks, opened on July 22, 1954 in Nowa Huta, a communist utopian district built in 1949 near Kraków in the area formerly occupied by the village of Mogiła and surrounding farmland.

In the 1970s, the plant employed around 40,000 people and produced almost 7 million tons of steel annually.

In the 1980s, it was one of the most important centers of Solidarity and was the site of a strike action in 1988.

In 1990, after the end of Communism in Poland, the factory was renamed after Polish engineer Tadeusz Sendzimir, a pioneer of steelmaking technology.

In January 2005, the plant was acquired by Mittal Steel Company, which merged into ArcelorMittal.

In 2020, the blast furnace was permanently shut down.
