= Nowa Huta =

Former district of Krakow, Poland

- Former district
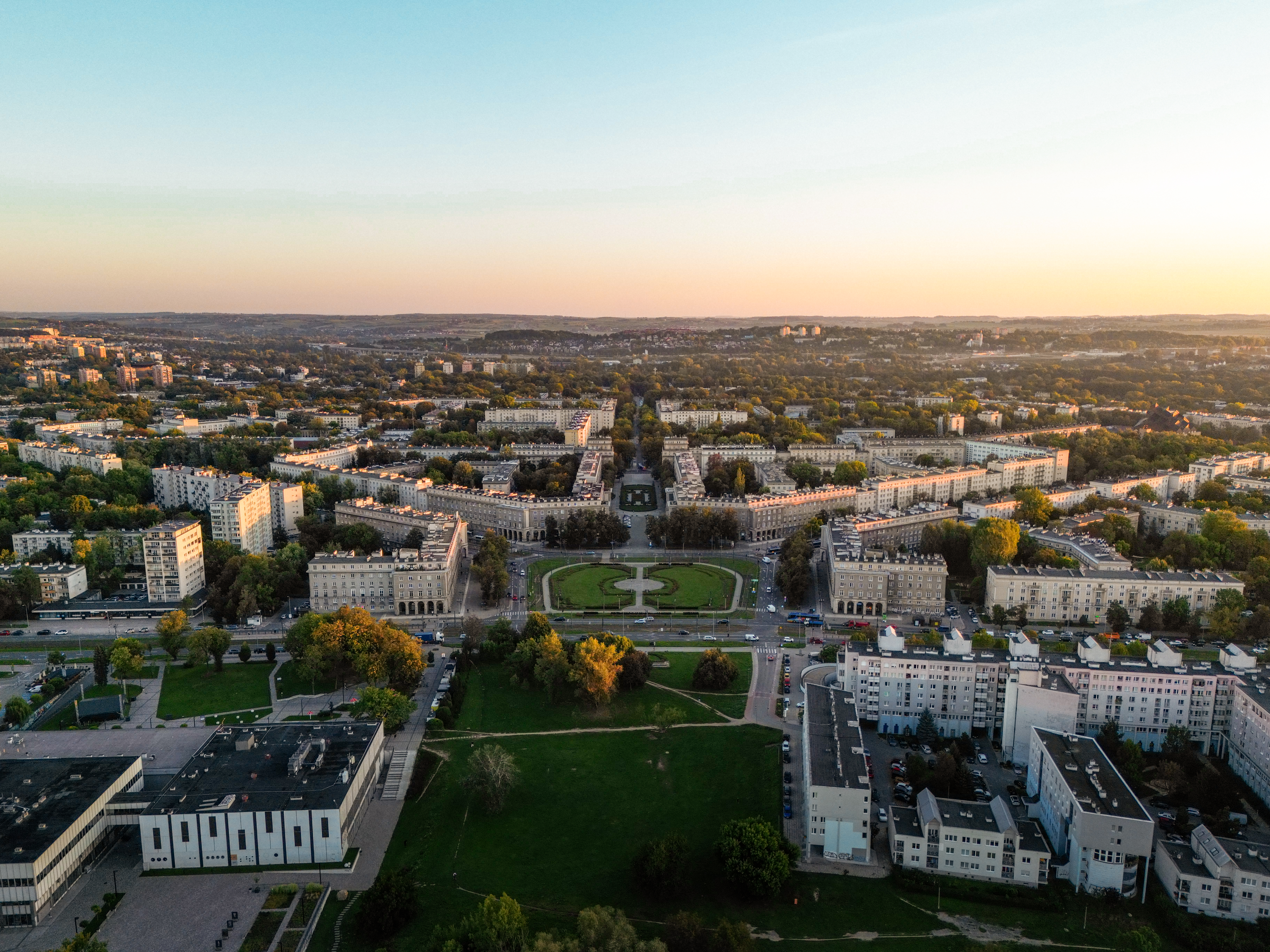
- The central, oldest part of Nowa Huta (view from the south)

- The former district of Nowa Huta (until 1990) and its division into small districts
- Coordinates: 50°04′20″N 20°02′15″E
- Country: Poland
- Voivodeship: Lesser Poland
- County/City: Kraków
- Time zone: UTC+1 (CET)
  - Summer (DST): UTC+2 (CEST)
- Area code: +48 12

Historic Monument of Poland
- Official name: The architectural and urban complex of the Nowa Huta district
- Designated: 2023-01-30
- Reference no.: Dz. U. z 2023 r. poz. 222

Nowa Huta (IPA pronounced [ˈnɔva ˈxuta], literally "The New Ironworks") is the easternmost district of Kraków, Poland. With more than 200,000 inhabitants, it is one of the most populous areas of the city. Until 1990, the neighbouring districts were considered expansions of the original Nowa Huta district, and were linked by the same tramway system. Today, the district formally known as Nowa Huta has been divided into several smaller districts.

Nowa Huta is one of the largest planned socialist realist settlements or districts ever built (another being Magnitogorsk in Russia) in the entire world.

Built as a planned ideal city, its street hierarchy, layout and certain scale of architecture bear similarities of Paris or London. The abundance of parks and green areas in Nowa Huta make it one of the greenest corners in Kraków.

== History ==
The historic area of present-day Nowa Huta is one of the few places in Poland settled continuously since the Neolithic age. Archaeological research has discovered a large Celtic and West Slavic settlement. In the 8th century, a mound was erected nearby by the Vistulans tribe. According to legend, the Wanda Mound is a tomb of Wanda, daughter of Krakus, a mythical founder of Kraków. In the 13th century, a Cistercian monastery in the village of Mogiła was built.

In the nineteenth century and at the beginning of the twentieth century, during the partitions of Poland and up to World War I, the outskirts of Nowa Huta constituted a border between territories controlled by Austria-Hungary and Russia. One can find historic Austro-Hungarian fortresses there, as well as one of Europe's oldest permanent airfields (Kraków-Rakowice-Czyżyny Airport, currently housing the Polish Aviation Museum).

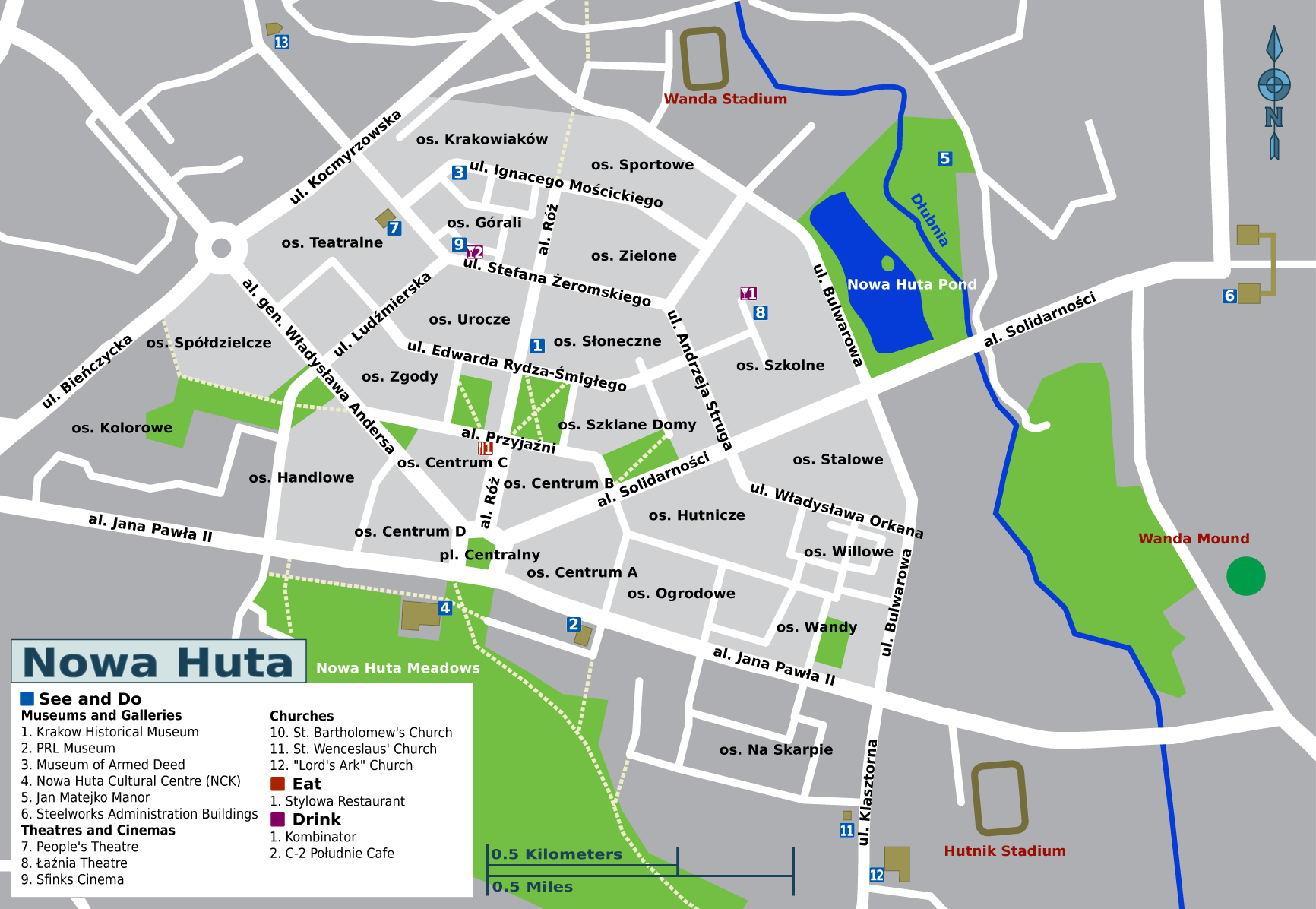
The central, oldest part of Nowa Huta (Historic Monument of Poland).

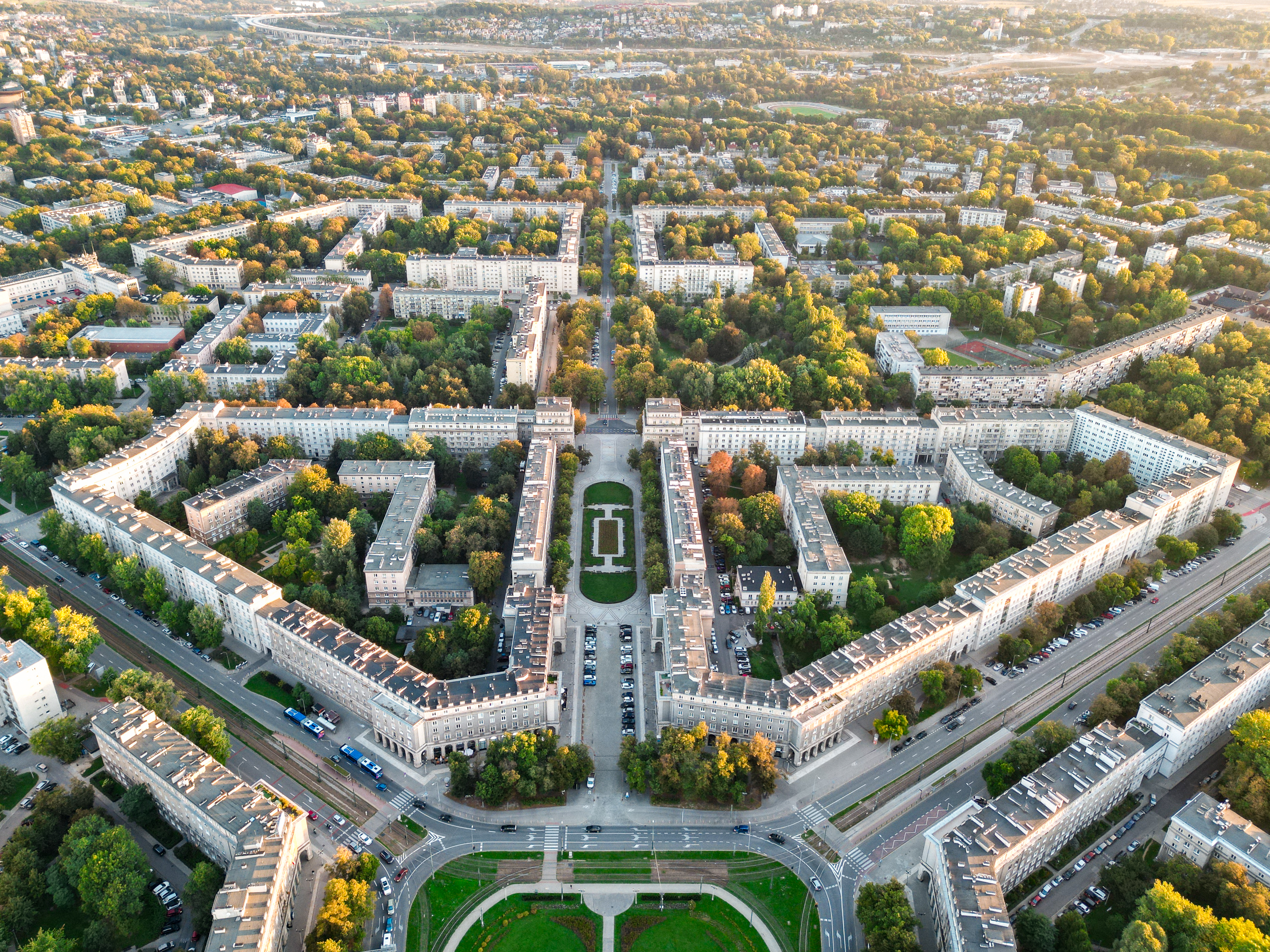
Panorama of the Avenue of Roses

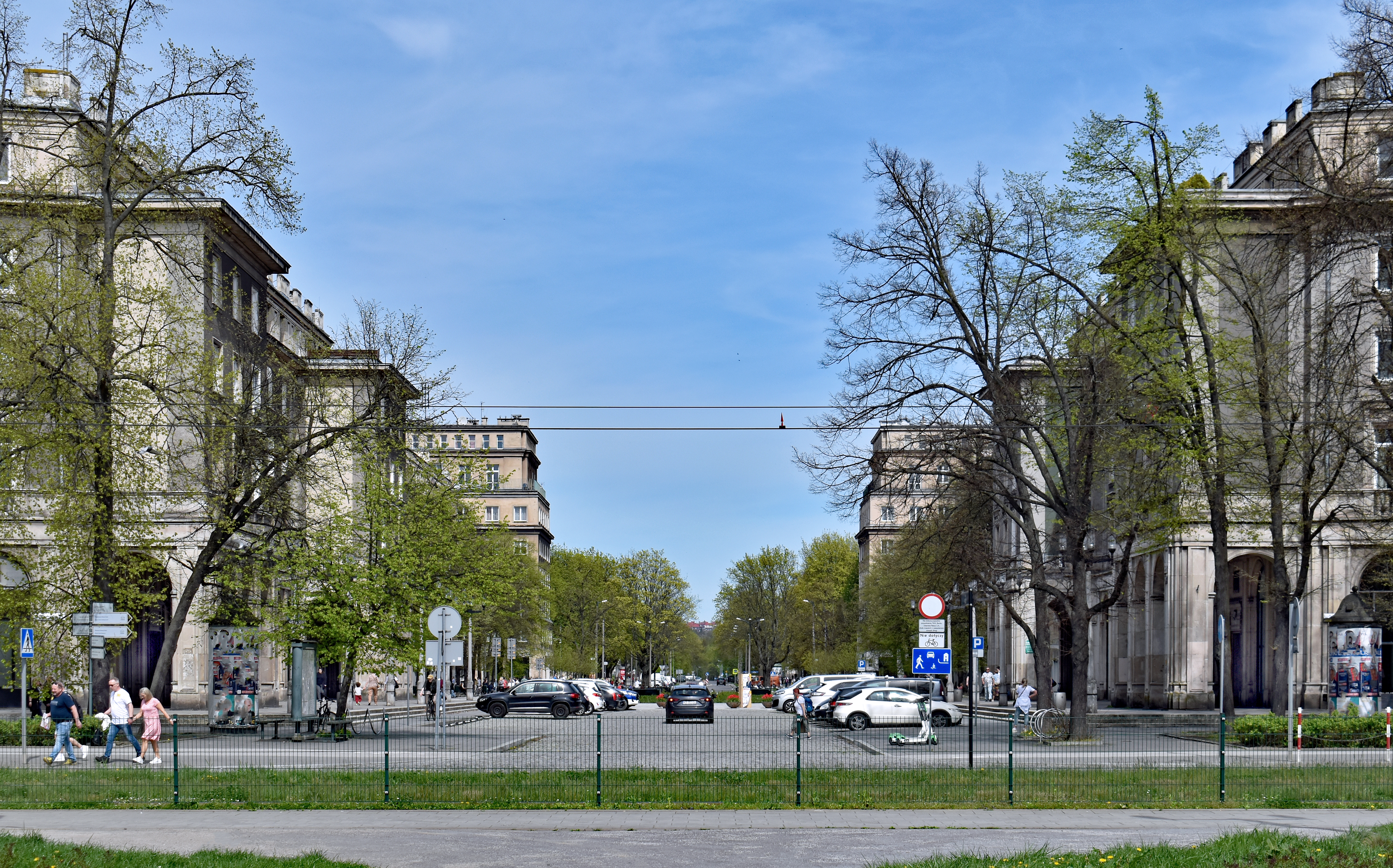
Centre of Nowa Huta Aleja Róż (Avenue of Roses) (2024)

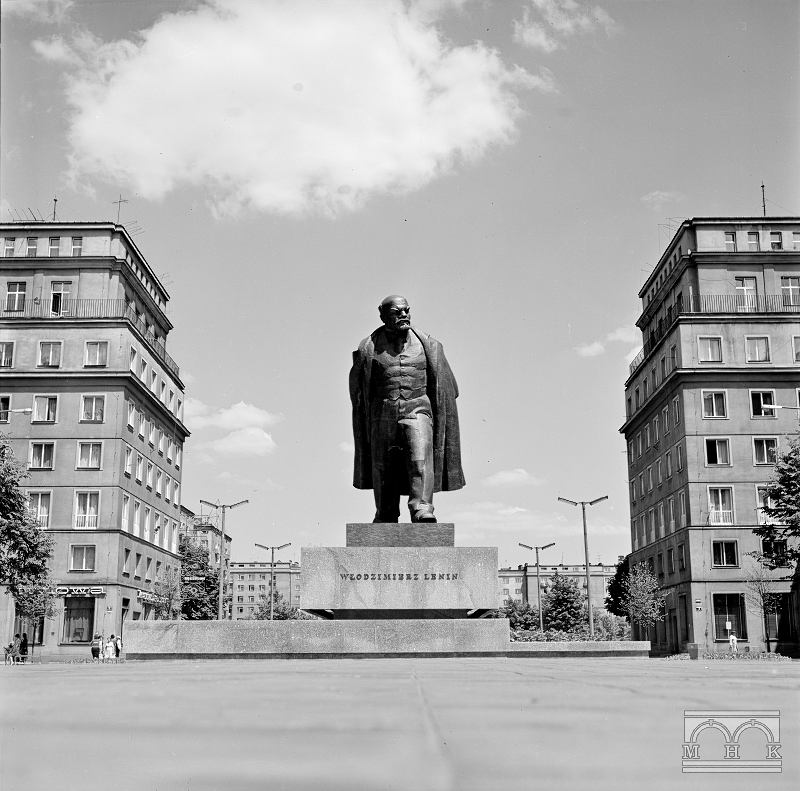
Avenue of Roses Vladimir Lenin's monument (1973)

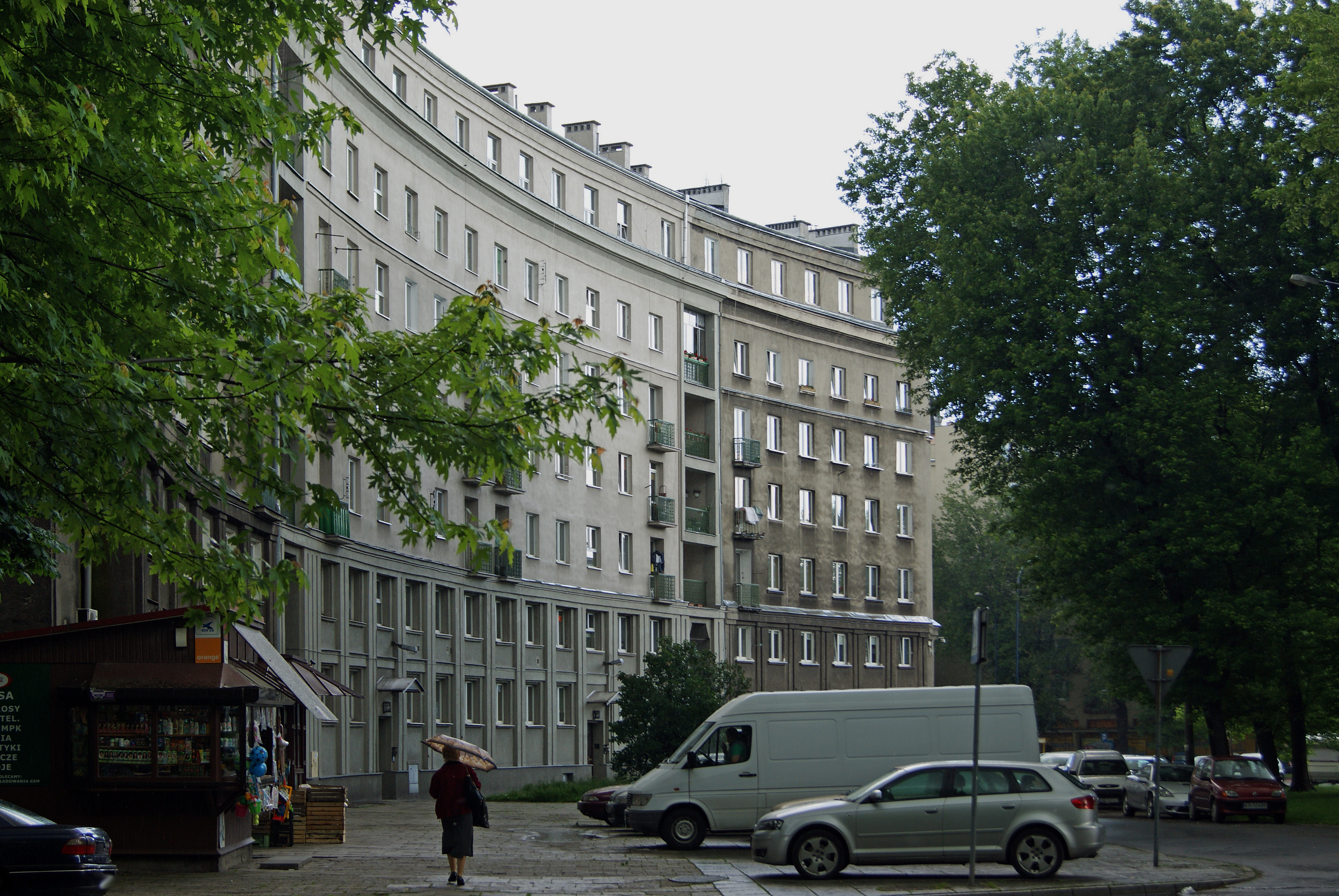
Nowa Huta's street hierarchy and certain buildings often resemble Paris

Following the Vistula–Oder Offensive in 1945, the Socialist government had encountered substantial resistance to their new regime from middle-class residents of Kraków. A referendum held by the authorities was soundly defeated by the people of Kraków – a major cause of embarrassment to the government. To "correct the class imbalance", the authorities commenced building a satellite industrial city to attract people from lower socioeconomic backgrounds to the region, such as peasants and the working-class.

Nowa Huta was created in 1949 as a separate city near Kraków, on terrain repossessed by the Socialist government from the former villages of Mogiła, Pleszów and Krzesławice. It was planned as a colossal center of heavy industry. The city was intended to become an ideal city for Socialist propaganda, and populated primarily by industrial workers. In 1951, it became a part of the city of Kraków as its new district, and in the following year, construction of tramway connections was underway. On January 1, 1951, the Council of Ministers issued a decision to dissolve the Mogiła municipality. As a result, several suburban villages previously belonging to the abolished commune were incorporated into Kraków’s Nowa Huta district. These included: Branice, Chałupki, Chałupki Górne, Holendry, Kopanina, Kujawy, Mogiła, Piekiełko, Pleszów, Ruszcza, Stryjów, and Wola Rusiecka.

On 22 July 1954 the Vladimir Lenin Steelworks was opened, and in less than twenty years, the factory became the largest steel mill in Poland. In the 1960s, the city expanded rapidly. The monumental architecture of the Plac Centralny (Central Square) was surrounded by colossal apartment blocks. In the 1970s, steel production reached seven million tons annually. At the same time, the largest tobacco factory in Poland was opened there, as well as a colossal cement factory.

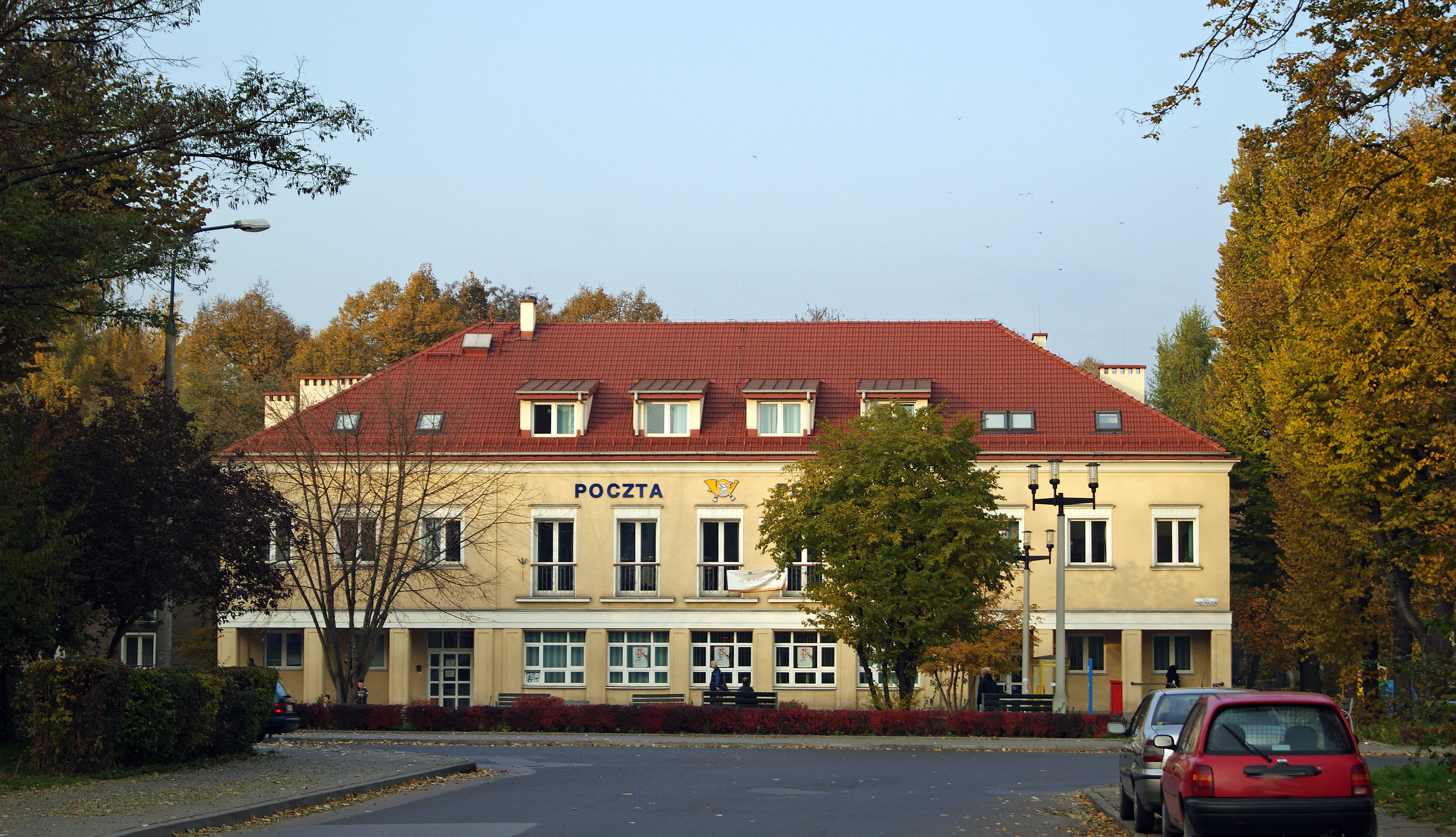
Post office no 28 in Osiedle ('Estate') Willowe of Nowa Huta

The reasons for building such an industrial city near Kraków were primarily ideological, because coal needed to be transported from Silesia, and iron ore needed to be transported from the Soviet Union, while the products were shipped to other parts of Poland, due to local demand for steel being relatively small. Such disadvantages became visible in the 1980s, when the economic crisis halted the city's growth. Nevertheless, the primacy of political reasons for choosing this location is not obvious. Kraków was a center of learning, with established schools of engineering and scientific research departments, providing the necessary expertise along with qualified staff. The presence of good railway links for bringing raw materials and the proximity of the river to supply water also played a role. The site was elevated high enough to avoid flooding, and the historic villages that it replaced were relatively small. All of the above factors quickly made the investment pay off.

In line with the then policy of state atheism, one significant type of building lacking from the original urban design of Nowa Huta was a Roman Catholic church. However, the public campaign to construct such a building lasted several years. As early as 1952, inhabitants of Nowa Huta began applying for consent to build a church. In 1960, violent street demonstrations with riot police erupted over a wooden cross that was erected without a permit. The locals were supported by then Bishop Karol Wojtyla, the future Pope John Paul II, who began hosting outdoor Christmas Eve Midnight Masses in 1959, regardless of weather, and replaced the cross every time that it was removed. In 1967, permits to build the desired church were granted, and the Arka Pana (Lord's Ark Church also translated as the Church of Our Lady Queen of Poland) was under construction from 1969 to 1977. The complex was consecrated by Wojtyla in May 1977. Wojtyla himself, after his ascension to the papacy in 1978, intended to visit Nowa Huta during his first papal pilgrimage in 1979, but was not permitted to do so.

On January 1, 1973, by decision of the Council of Ministers, several villages from the former Kraków County (part of the historic Kraków Voivodeship) were incorporated into the city of Kraków. The districts added to Nowa Huta included: Błonie, Cło, Górka Kościelnicka, Kościelniki, Nowa Wieś, Przylasek Rusiecki, Przylasek Wyciąski, Wolica, and Wyciąże.

During the 1980s, Nowa Huta became a city of many demonstrations and violent street protests of the Solidarity movement, fought by the police. At that time, almost 29,000 of the 38,000 workers of the Lenin Steelworks belonged to the Solidarity trade union.

== Architecture ==
=== Before 1956 (socialist realism) ===
The design movement of socialist realism in Poland, as in other member-states of the Warsaw Pact, was enforced from 1949 to 1956. It involved all domains of art, but particularly architecture. The main lines of this new trend were very precisely indicated in a 1949 resolution of the National Council of Party Architects. Architecture was an extremely important weapon to the creators of a new social order. It was intended to help to form a socialist theme – the ideas sparking citizens' consciousness and outlook on life. Architects had a crucial role in this and were perceived not merely as engineers creating streets and edifices but as "engineers of the human soul", in Stalin's terminology. The general outlook of a building was more valued than its simple aesthetics. It needed to express social ideas, to arouse a feeling of persistence and power.

Since the style of the Renaissance was generally regarded as the most revered in old Polish architecture, it was also intended to become Poland's socialist national format. However, in the course of incorporating the principles of socialist realism, there were a number of deviations observed. One of these was to more closely reflect Soviet architecture, which resulted in the majority of works blending into one another; and finally, the general acceptance of the classicist form. From 1953, critical opinions were increasingly frequently heard, and the doctrine was finally given up in 1956. To this day, the socrealist city center is considered a monument of architecture.

=== After 1956 ===
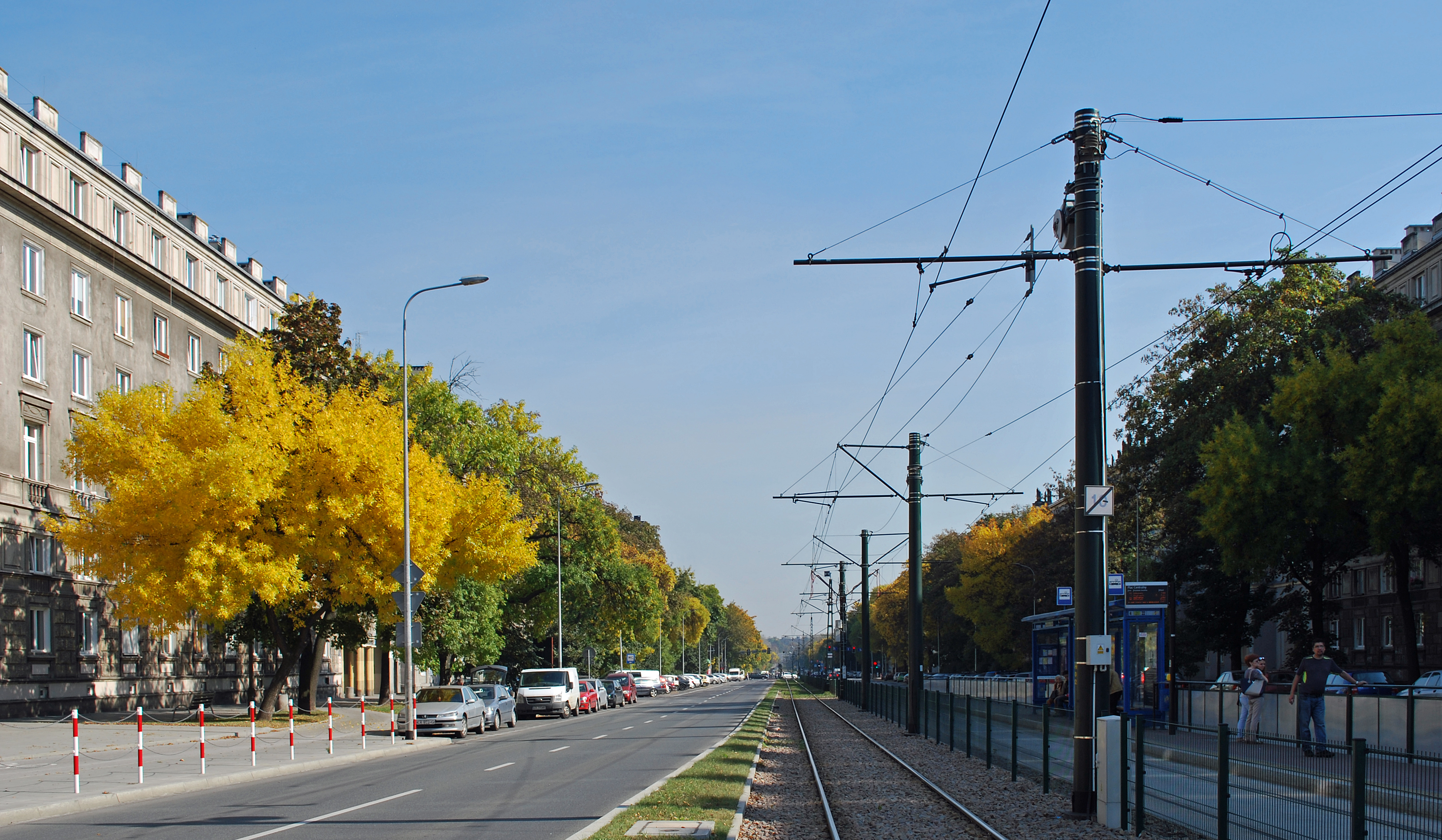
Solidarity Avenue, 2010

Following the political liberalization of the Polish October in 1956, it became possible to introduce modernist style in architecture. Polish architects were allowed to visit Stockholm to learn about the newest solutions in urban design. As a result, the so-named "Swedish" apartment block was developed according to Le Corbusier guidelines. Among other buildings from that era, the Światowid cinema is worth noting. In the 1980s, the first postmodernist buildings were built, a notable example being the Centrum E housing estate. In the 1970s and 1980s, many apartment blocks were built using plattenbau.

Nowa Huta's central "Avenue of Roses" featured a nationally known statue of Vladimir Lenin, unveiled on 28 April 1973. The bronze monument was pulled down in 1989 by the city, as a result of numerous protests by local citizens. Several thousand onlookers came to watch the dismantling. The monument is currently on display at the High Chaparral Museum in Hillerstorp, Sweden.

Sacral architecture should also be noted, particularly the Arka Pana (Lord's Ark Church), which was built to resemble Noah's Ark. It was designed by the architects Wojciech Pietrzyk and Jan Grabacki, with the design being influenced by Le Corbusier's Notre Dame du Haut in Ronchamp.

=== Nowa Huta today ===
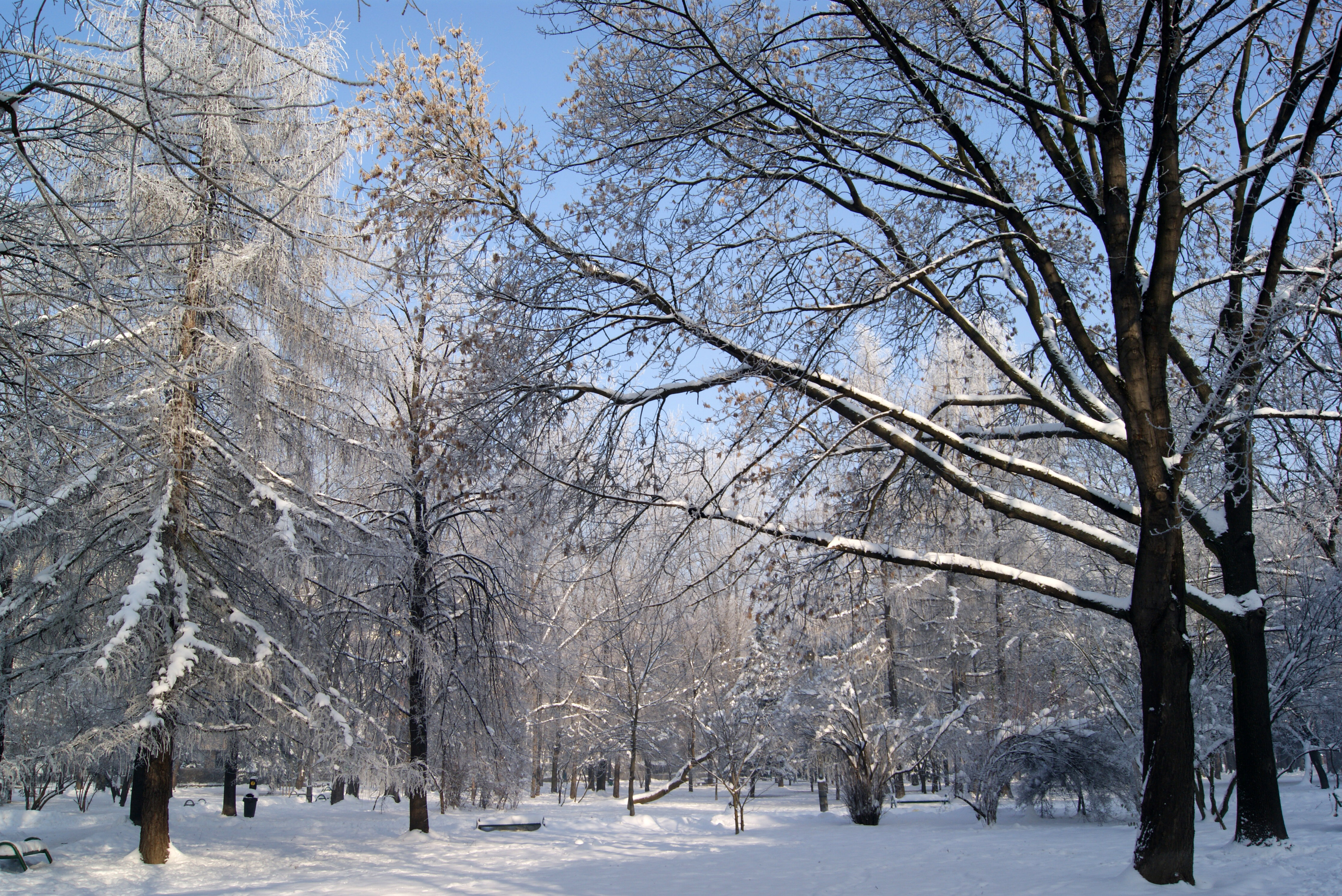
Park Szwedzki (Swedish Park) during winter

Since the fall of the USSR, the city that was once a showpiece for Stalinism now boasts many tributes to ardent opponents of the ideology. Streets formerly named after Vladimir Lenin and the Cuban Revolution have been renamed to honor Pope John Paul II and the Polish trade union Solidarność. Other streets were renamed after Edward Rydz-Śmigły and Ignacy Mościcki, politicians of the pre-World War II Sanation government. In 2004, Plac Centralny, Nowa Huta's central square, was renamed Plac Centralny im. Ronalda Reagana (Ronald Reagan Central Square) in honor of the former US President. However, this decision led to many objections, and the traditional name is still widely used. In 2014, a bright green statue of a urinating Lenin was installed as part of an arts festival.

== Cultural significance ==
- Nowa Huta is the location of an award-winning film by Andrzej Wajda, titled Man of Marble (Polish: Człowiek z marmuru), based on the true story of the rise and fall of a Stakhanovite bricklayer who helped build the new model socialist city during the course of Stalinism in Poland. Man of Marble, made in the mid-1970s, presaged the Solidarity labour union movement in Gdańsk that was ultimately responsible for overthrowing the Stalinist regime in Poland, as the film begins in Nowa Huta and ends in Gdańsk. The term "Man of Marble" presented in this film also contrasts the name of Joseph Stalin himself, whose last name means "Man of Steel".

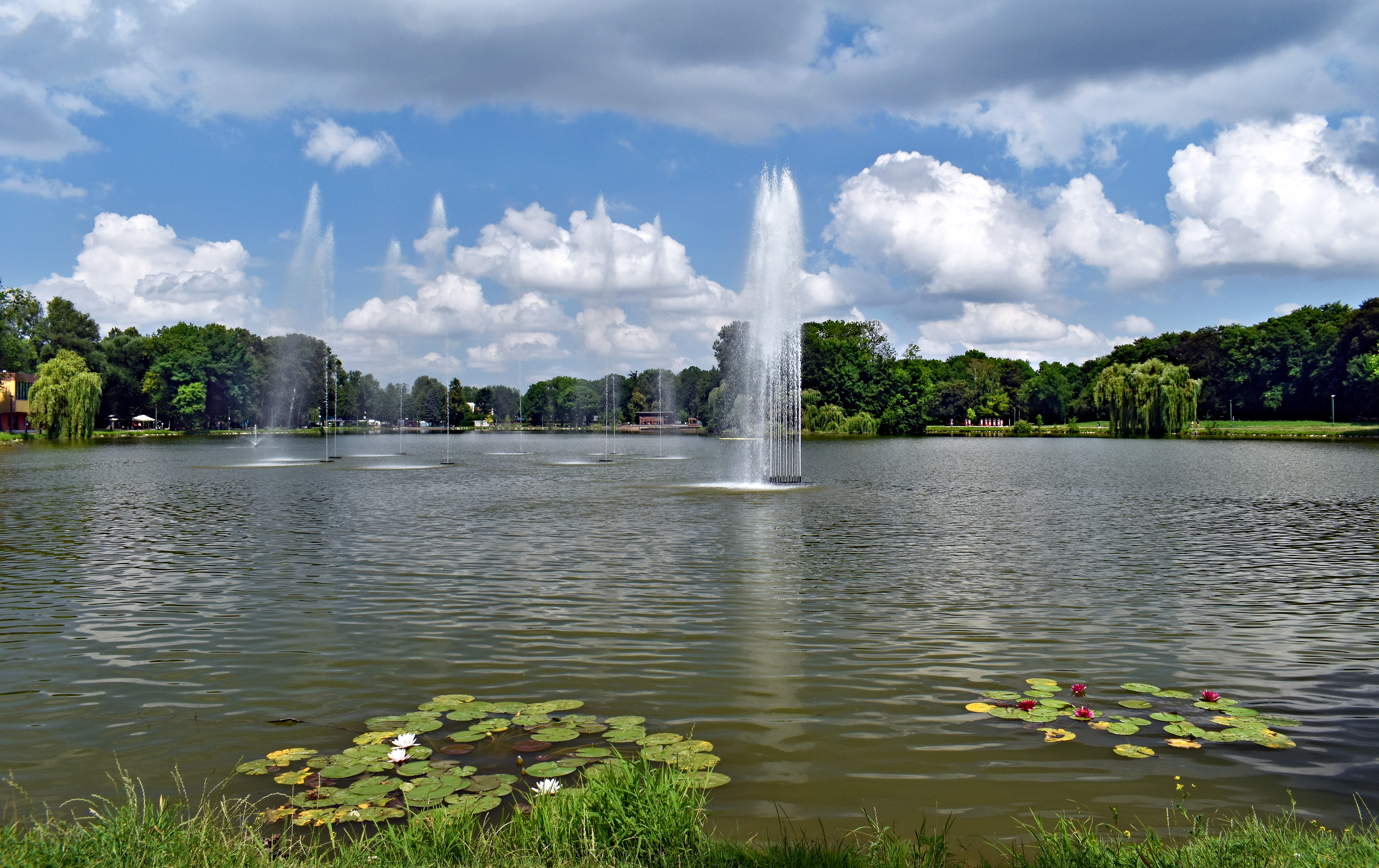
Nowa Huta Lake

- When the district was built in the 1950s, songs promoted by propaganda in the People's Republic of Poland included the widely popular hit single: "O Nowej to Hucie piosenka" ("This Song is about Nowa Huta"), still widely remembered to this day, especially by many older Poles.
- Nowa Huta has figured prominently in Polish literature since its very beginning. The earliest works focused on ideological progress and on the conflict between the "bourgeois city" (Kraków) and its new Socialist district of Nowa Huta (a "Party bastion"). Among writers on this topic were Marian Brandys (Początek opowieści, 1951) and Tadeusz Konwicki (Przy budowie, 1950). A hefty supply of short poems included Jalu Kurek's "Z nowej Huty pocztówka" (1953; a city park (pl) was named after him for this particular work), and future Nobel laureate Wisława Szymborska ("Na powitanie budowy socjalistycznego miasta", 1952, from the collection of Stalinist paeans of praise known as "Dlatego żyjemy"). Although Nowa Huta disappeared from literary narratives after the period of Socialist realism, it returned during the 1980s when it became the hotbed of struggle against Socialism, and later, during the 1990s, when it became a symbol of the new post-Socialist reality stemming from both its socialist and anti-socialist past.
- Poland's first ever opera, written in 1794 by Wojciech Bogusławski, known as "The Presumed Miracle, or the Krakovians and the Highlanders" (Polish: Cud mniemany, czyli Krakowiacy i Górale), is set in the historic village of Mogiła, which Nowa Huta was built over. The two newest housing estates are named after the play: osiedle Krakowiaków ('Krakówians estate') and osiedle Górali ('highlanders estate'). The opera by Bogusławski was also the first theatre production played at the opening of the district's legendary Ludowy Theatre (lit. 'people's theatre').
- "Oedipus – a tragedy from Nowa Huta" is a play based on the ancient Greek myth of Oedipus, premiered in Łaźnia Nowa Theatre, under direction of Bartosz Szydłowski.

== Cultural venues ==
- Ludowy Theatre, Nowa Huta's original theatre venue.
- Łaźnia Nowa Theatre
- Kino Sfinks art-house cinema
- Nowohuckie Centrum Kultury
- Cyprian Norwid Cultural Centre

== Landmarks ==
- Wanda Mound - early medieval tumulus built in c. 7th–8th century
- Mogiła Abbey - Cistercian abbey founded in 1222, built in Gothic style, facade rebuilt in 1779-1780 in Baroque style
- Church of Saint Bartholomew - former parish church of the village of Mogiła, built from wood in 1466
- Branice Manor - complex consisting of a Renaissance lumber room (built c. 1600) and a Neoclassical palace (built c. 1800)
- Tadeusz Sendzimir Steelworks - formerly Huta im. Lenina (Vladimir Lenin Steelworks)
- Tadeusz Sendzimir Steelworks Headquarters - designed by Janusz Ingarden, Marta Ingarden and Janusz Ballenstedt, built 1951-1955 in socialist-realist style
- Plac Centralny - main square of the district with socialist-realist architecture, designed by Janusz Ingarden and built 1952-1953
- Ludowy Theatre - designed by Janusz Ingarden, Marta Ingarden and Jan Dąbrowski, built 1954-1955 in socialist-realist style
- Świt Cinema - designed by Andrzej Uniejewski and built 1951–1953 in socialist-realist style
- Światowid Cinema - designed by Andrzej Uniejewski and built 1953–1957 in socialist-realist style, today houses a branch of the Historical Museum of Kraków, History of Nowa Huta
- Swedish block (Blok Szwedzki) - first modernist building in Nowa Huta, designed by Janusz Ingarden and Marta Ingarden and built 1957-1959
- Centrum E - postmodern housing estate, designed by Romuald Loegler and built 1985-1995
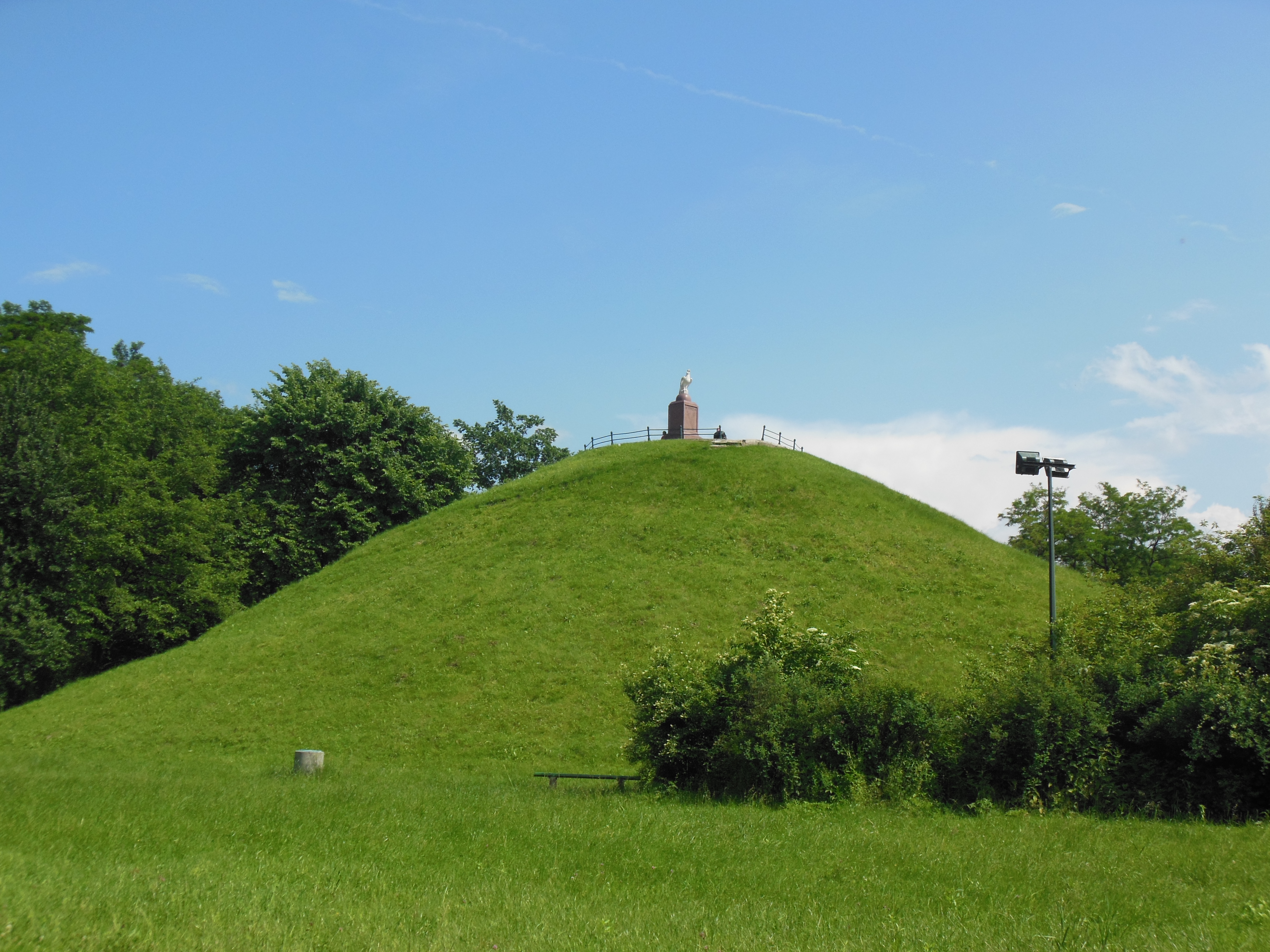
Wanda Mound

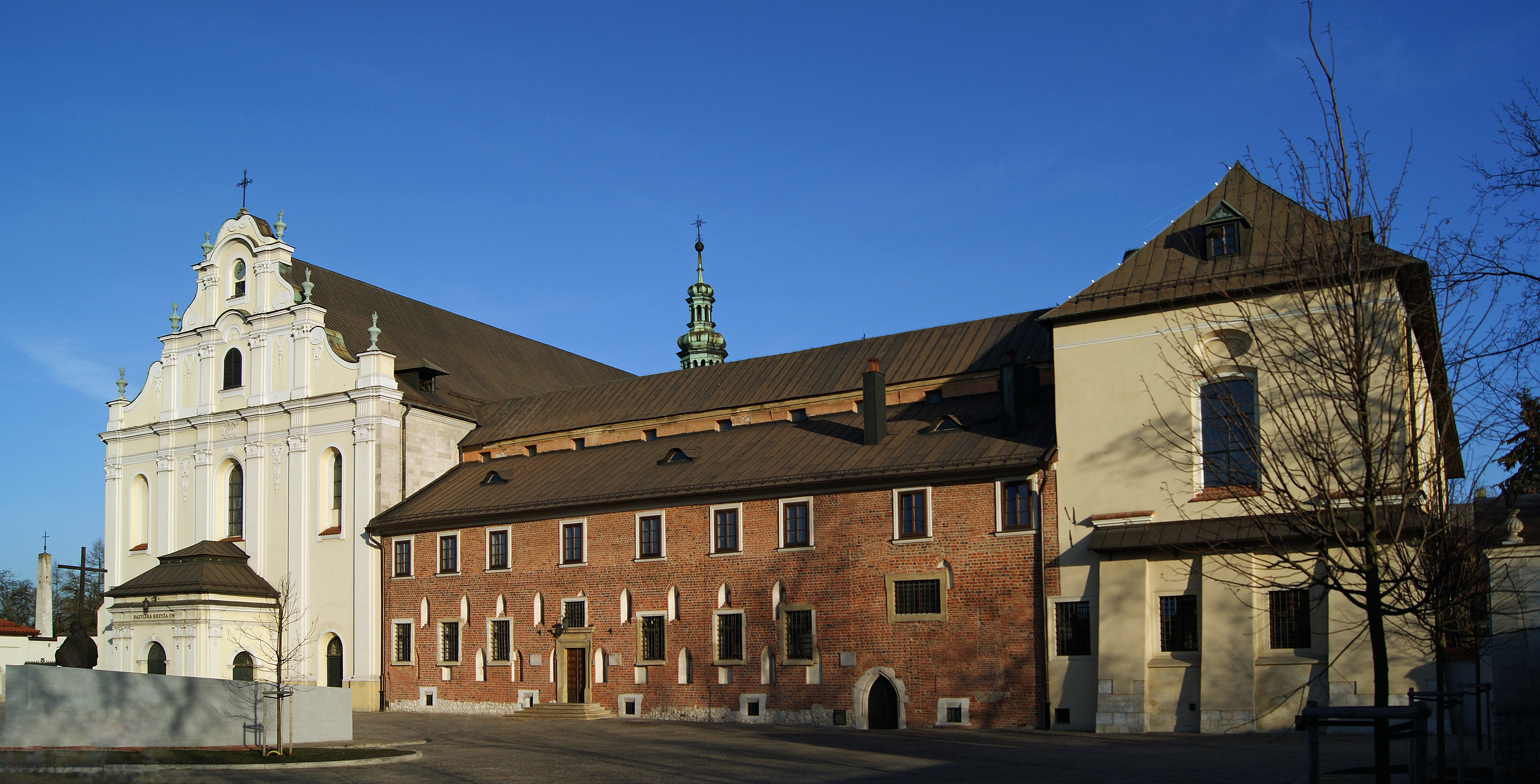
Mogiła Abbey

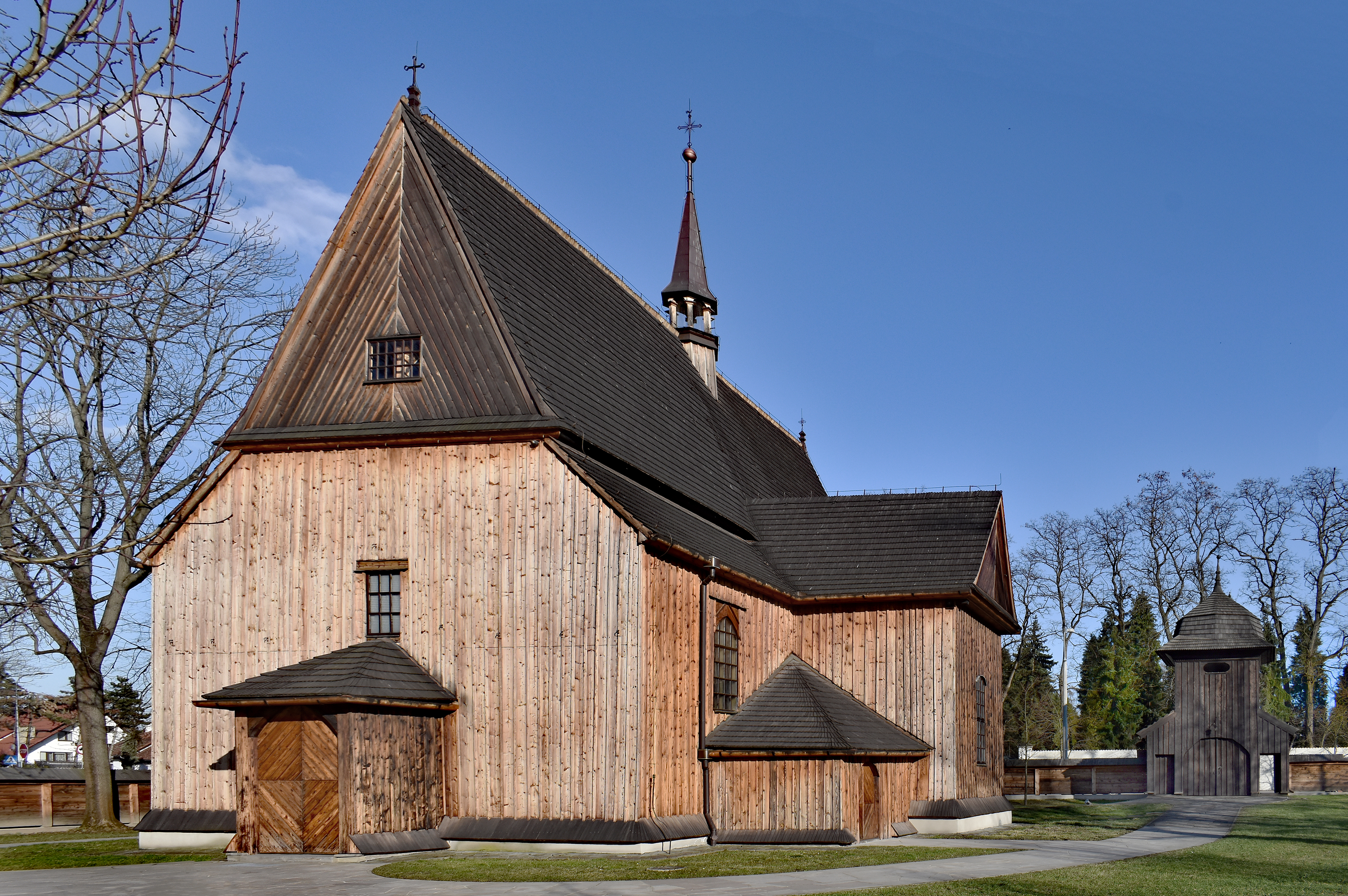
St. Bartholomew church

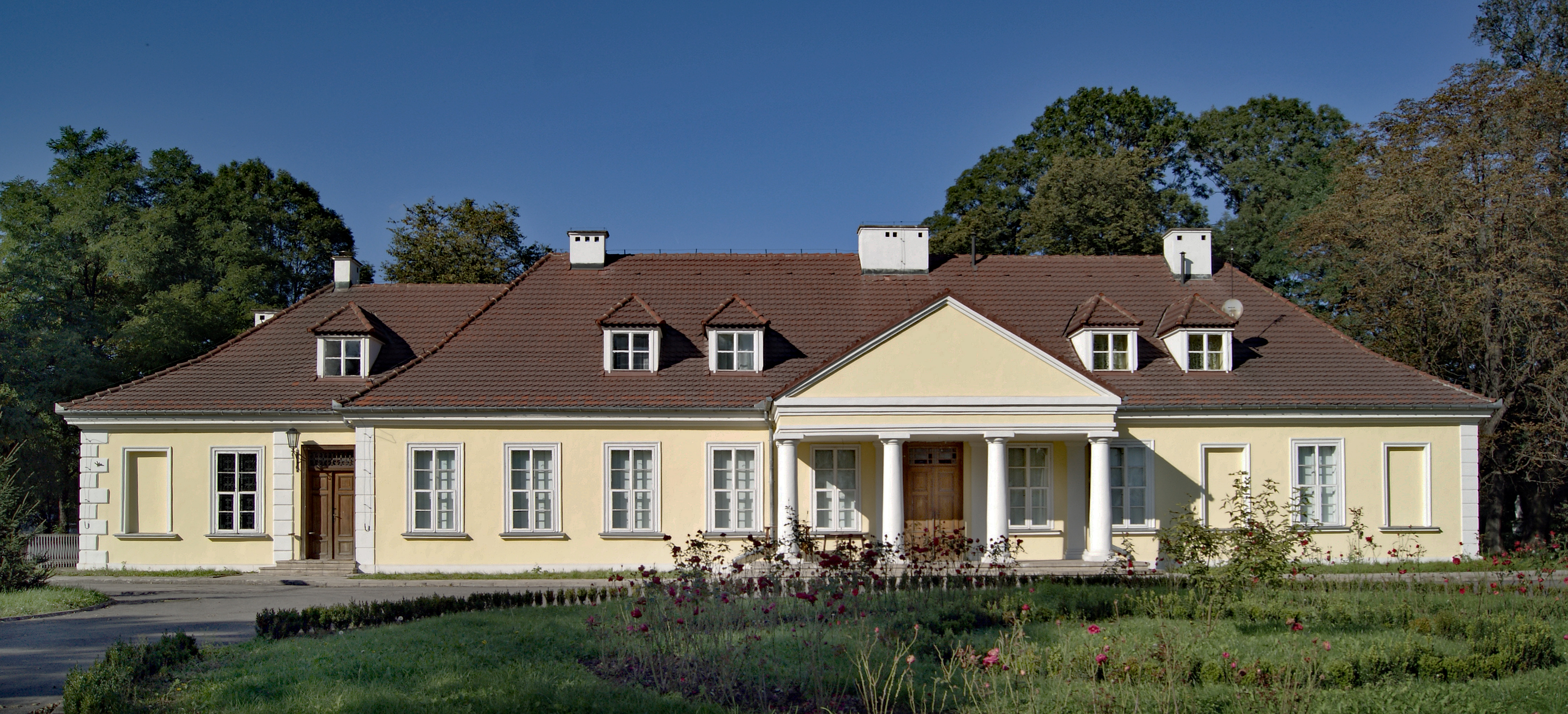
Branice manor house

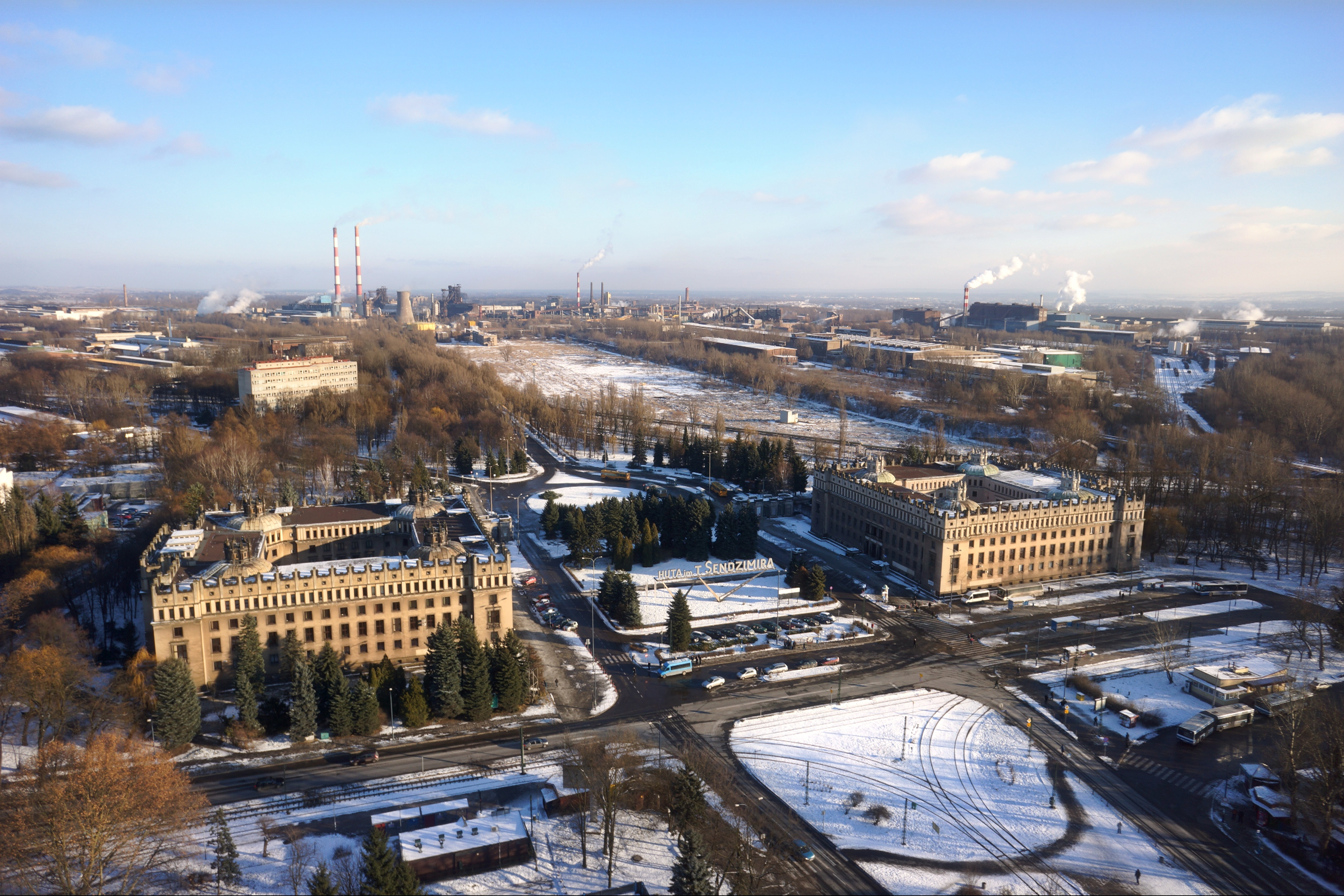
Former V.I. Lenin Steel Mill, in the foreground the buildings of the steelworks headquarters

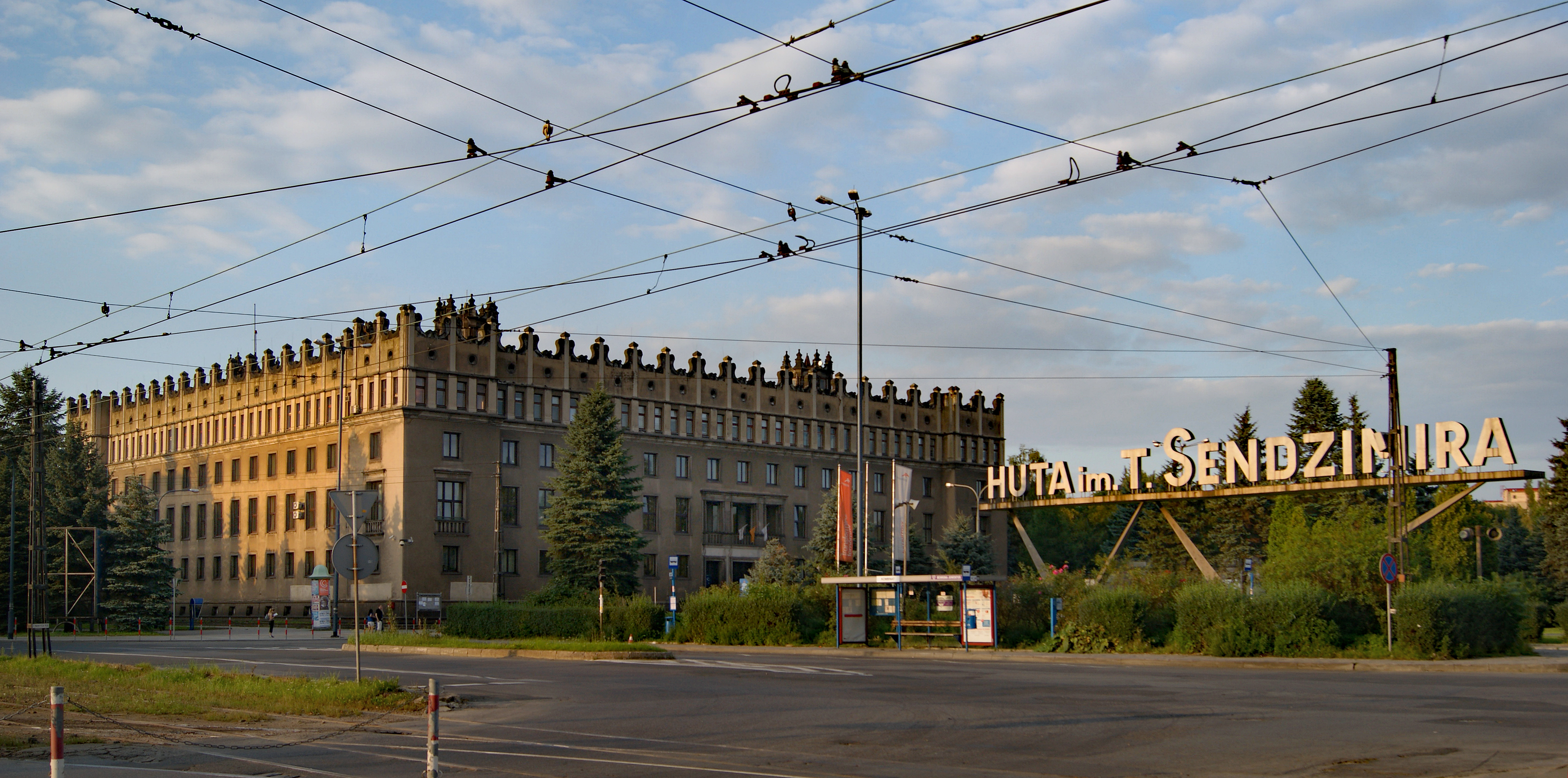
The building of the steelworks management

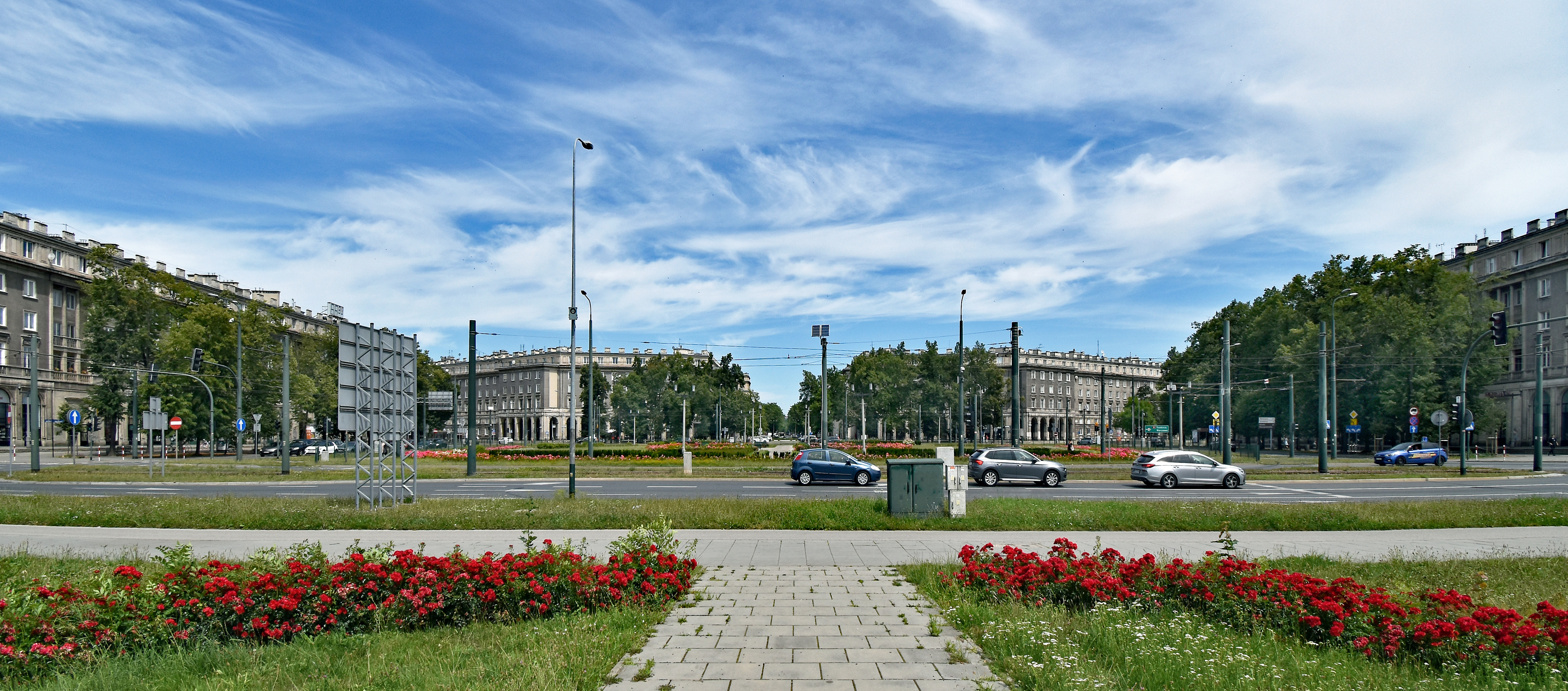
Central Square (Plac Centralny)

Osiedle (residential estate) Centrum A

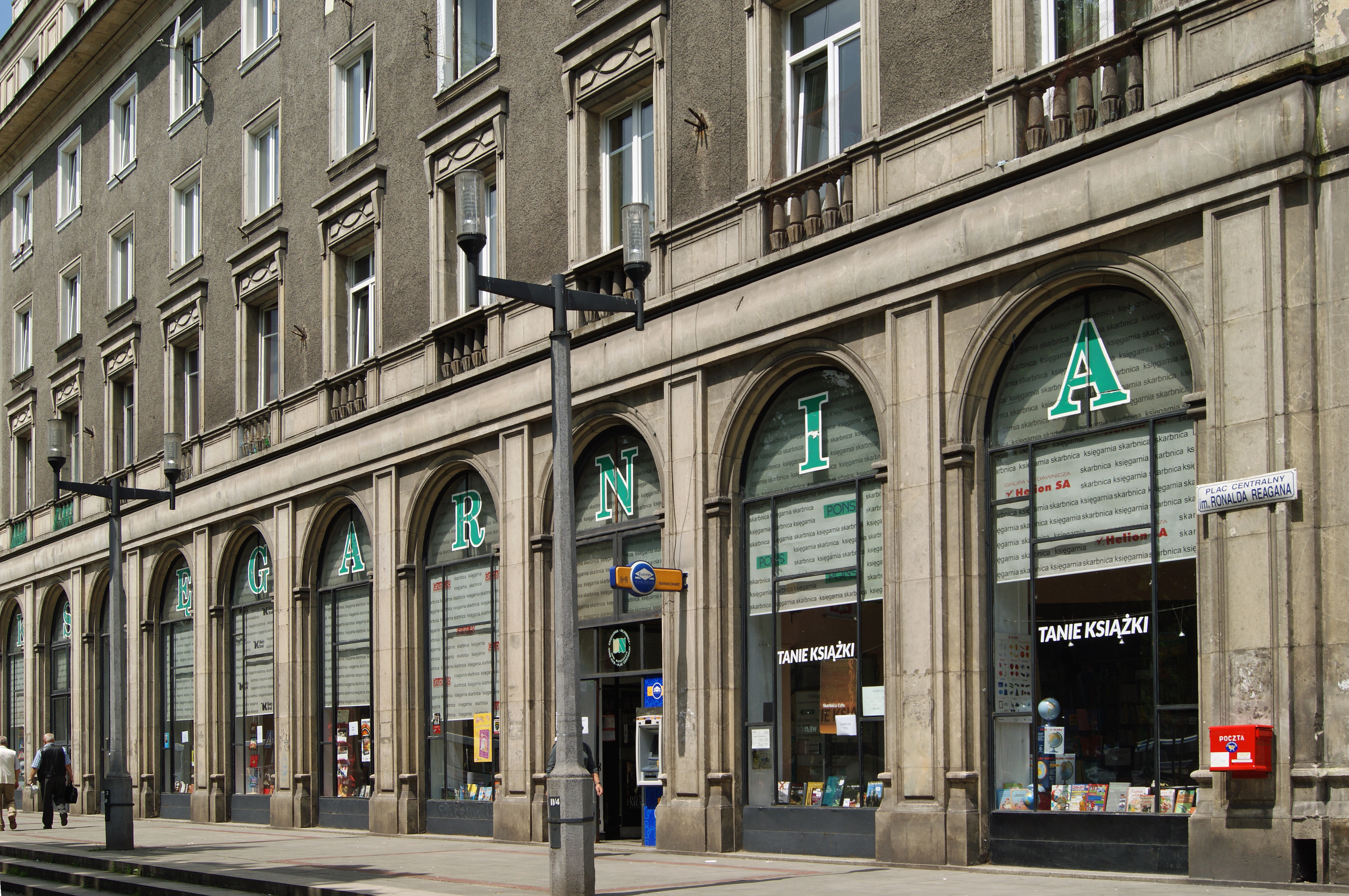
Central Square, osiedle Centrum C

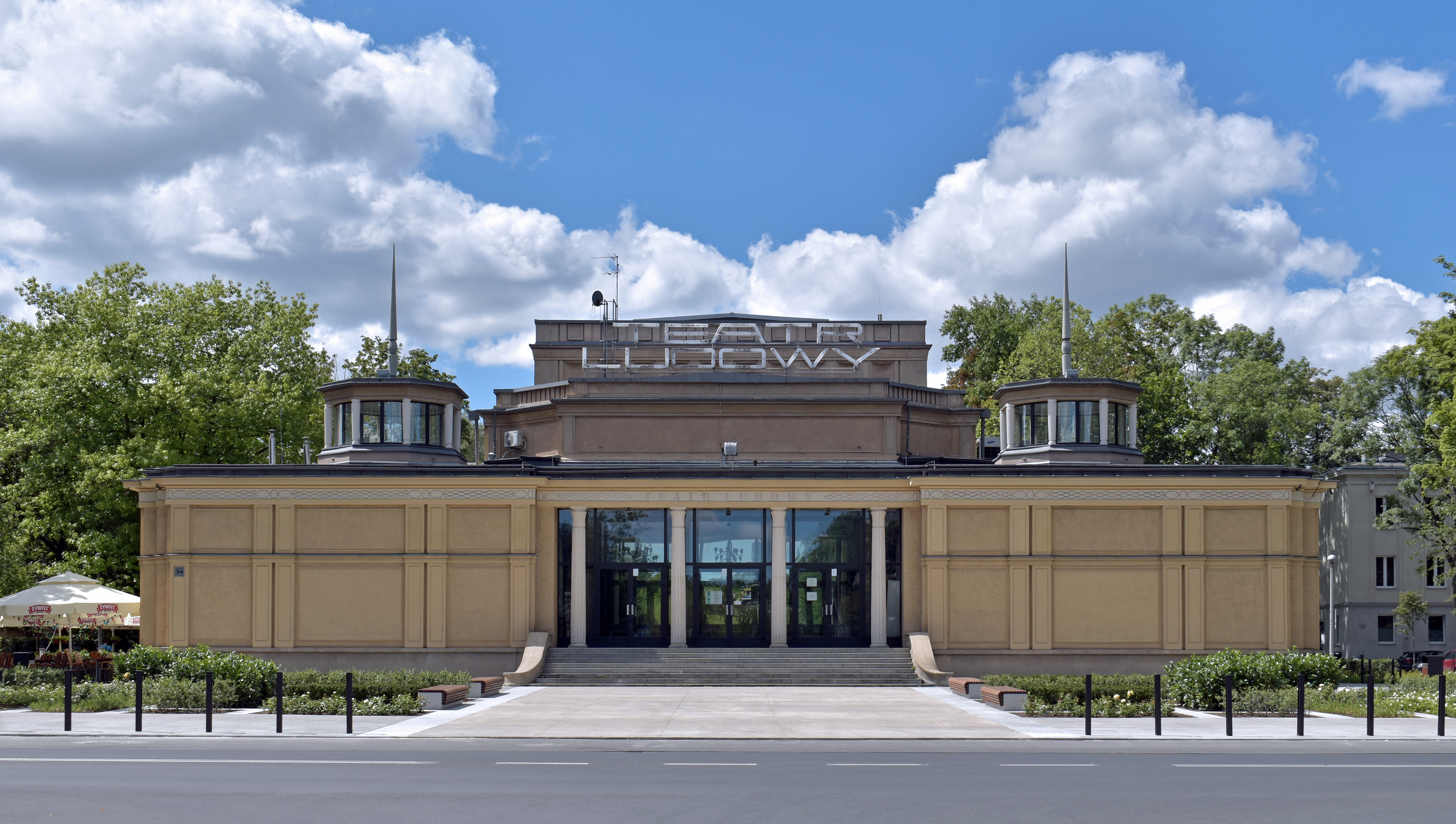
Teatr Ludowy (People's Theatre)

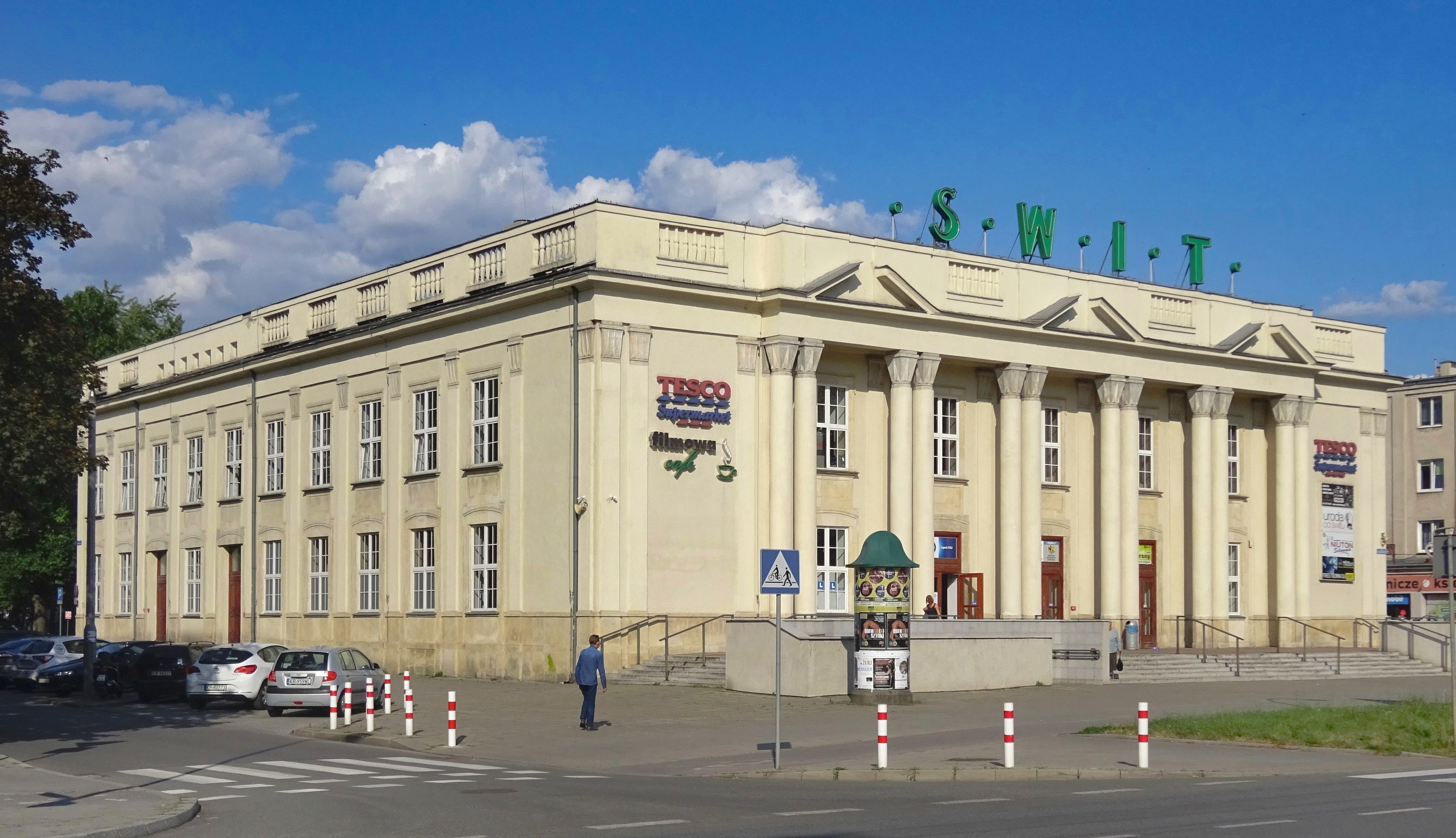
Świt Cinema

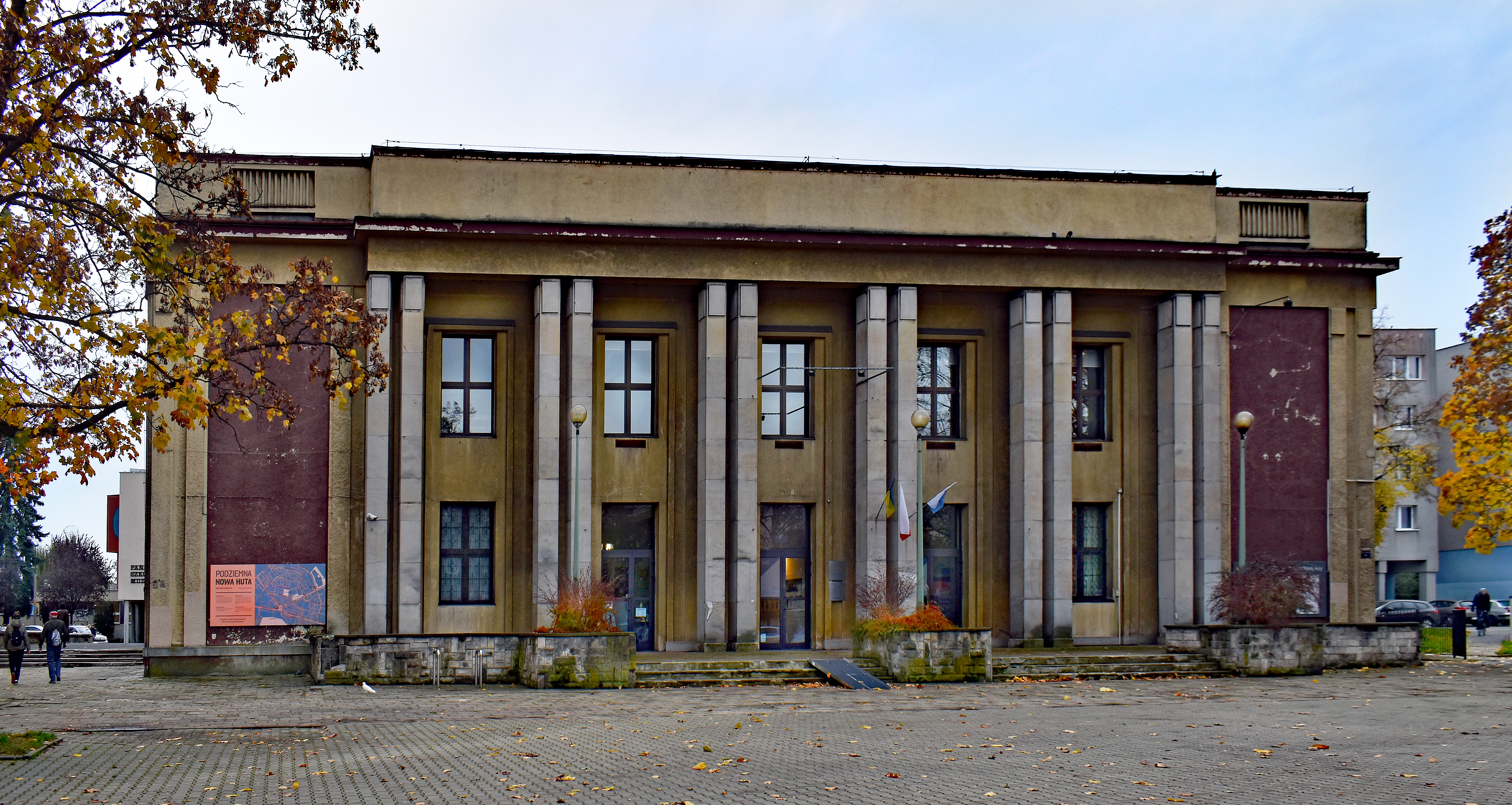
Światowid Cinema

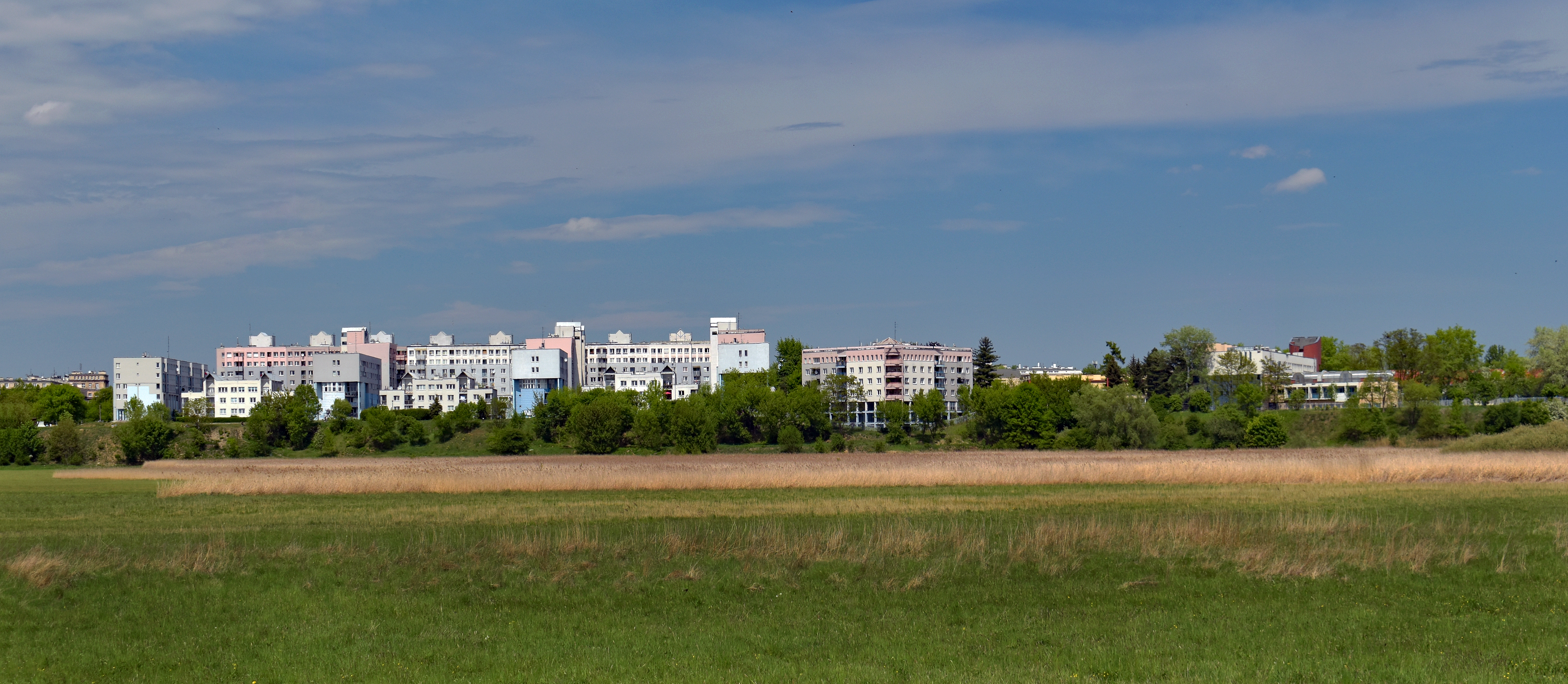
Nowa Huta Meadows and Centrum E

== Notable people ==
- Marcin Cabaj
- Jerzy Fedorowicz
- Michał Pazdan
- Ireneusz Raś
- Paulina Dudek (Dudziszon)
- Józef Szajna
- Marcin Wasilewski

== Industry ==
- Tadeusz Sendzimir Steelworks (Polish: Huta im. Tadeusza Sendzimira), owned by Mittal Steel Company
- Kraków Power Station (Polish: Elektrociepłownia Kraków)
- Philip Morris Cigarette Company
- Comarch, an international software house

== Education ==
- Faculty of Mechanical Engineering, Tadeusz Kościuszko University of Technology
- University School of Physical Education (AKF)

== Sport ==
Nowa Huta is home to several of Kraków's notable sports clubs. Rich in history, Hutnik Nowa Huta football club has sizeable support in the city, as does Kraków's only speedway club, Wanda Kraków.

The Kraków Speedway Stadium is a 12,000 all-seated stadium on Odmogile road. It has hosted notable events such as the 1960 Poland versus England international that attracted a crowd of 25,000 and a qualifying round of the Speedway World Team Cup in 1964.

== See also ==
- Głos – Tygodnik Nowohucki
- Kraków
- History of Kraków
- Eisenhüttenstadt
- Magnitogorsk

== Bibliography ==
- Mariusz Czepczyński, Cultural Landscapes of Post-Socialist Cities. Representation of Powers and Needs. Ashgate 2008. ISBN 978-0-7546-7022-3.
- Katherine Lebow, Unfinished Utopia. Nowa Huta, Stalinism and Polish Society 1949–1956. Cornell University Press 2013. ISBN 978-0-8014-5124-9.
- Stanisław Panek and Edmund Piasecki. Nowa Huta. Wrocław 1971.
