= List of heads of state of Poland =

This article lists the heads of state of Poland. Currently, the President of Poland is the head of state of the country.

== Poland in the Early Middle Ages ==
=== Legendary rulers ===
Most of these rulers appear for the first time in chronicles from the 13th century:

Name	Lifespan	Reign start	Reign end	Notes	Family	Image
Lech I	6th century	6th century	6th century	Legendary founder of the Polish nation	Lechites (tribe)	
Krakus: Krak	8th century	8th century	8th century	Legendary founder of Kraków	Lechites (tribe)	
Krakus II: Krak II	8th century	8th century	8th century	According to the legend, he ruled in Kraków.	Lechites (tribe)	
Lech II	8th century	8th century	8th century	According to the legend, he ruled in Kraków.	Lechites (tribe)	
Wanda: Wąda	8th century	8th century	8th century	Legendary daughter of Krakus	Lechites (tribe)	
Leszko I: Leszek I; Duke	7th / 8th centuries	7th / 8th centuries	7th / 8th centuries	A legendary ruler of the West Slavic ("proto-Polish") tribe of Goplans and Polans	Goplans and Polans (tribes)	
Leszko II: Leszek II; Duke	8th century	8th century	8th century	A legendary duke of Polans	Popielids	
Leszko III: Leszek III; Duke	8th century	8th century	8th century	A legendary duke of Polans	Popielids	
Popiel I: Duke	8th century	8th century	8th century	A legendary duke of Polans	Popielids	
Popiel II: Duke	9th century	9th century	9th century	A legendary ruler dethroned by Piast. He appears (without the number) in the oldest Polish chronicle, Gesta principum Polonorum from the early 12th century.	Popielids	
Piast the Wheelwright: Polish: Piast Kołodziej Latin: Past Ckosisconis, Pazt filius Chosisconisu; Duke	9th century	9th century	9th century	A legendary founder of the Piast dynasty. Son of Chościsko, father of Siemowit. He appears in the oldest Polish chronicle, Gesta principum Polonorum from the early 12th century.	Piast	

=== Semi-legendary dukes of the Polans in Greater Poland ===
Several historians tend to believe that the three legendary rulers of early Poland before Mieszko I might actually be historical persons. They appear in the oldest Polish chronicle, Gesta principum Polonorum from the early 12th century.

Name	Lifespan	Reign start	Reign end	Notes	Family	Image
Siemowit: Ziemowit; Duke	9th century	9th century	9th century	Son of Piast the Wheelwright and Rzepicha	Piast	
Lestek: Leszek, Lestko; Duke	9th / 10th centuries	9th / 10th centuries	9th / 10th centuries	Son of Siemowit	Piast	
Siemomysł: Ziemomysł; Duke	10th century	10th century	10th century	Son of Lestek	Piast	

== Kingdom of Poland and Duchy of Poland (966–1569) ==
=== Piast dukes and kings ===
Name	Lifespan	Reign start	Reign end	Notes	Family	Image
Mieszko I: Duke	ca. 940 – 25 May 992	ca. 960	992	Son of Siemomysł. First Christian Polish monarch. Misico, dux Wandalorum	Piast	
Bolesław I the Brave: Bolesław I the Great Polish: Bolesław I Chrobry (Wielki)	967 – 17 June 1025	Duke: 992; King: 18 April 1025	Duke: 18 April 1025; King: 17 June 1025	Son of Mieszko I and Dobrawa of Bohemia. First to be crowned king. Regnum Sclavorum, Gothorum sive Polonorum	Piast	
Mieszko II Lambert	ca. 990 – 10/11 May 1034	1025	1031	Son of Bolesław I and Emnilda of Lusatia	Piast	
Bezprym: Duke	ca. 986 – 1032	1031	1032	Son of Bolesław I and Judith of Hungary	Piast	
Otto Bolesławowic: Duke	1000 – 1033	1032	1032	Son of Bolesław I and Emnilda	Piast	
Dytryk: Theoderick; Duke	after 992 – after 1032	1032	1032 /1033	Grandson of Mieszko I and Oda of Haldensleben	Piast	
Mieszko II Lambert: Duke	ca. 990 – 10/11 May 1034	1032	1034	Restored	Piast	
Bolesław the Forgotten: Polish: Bolesław Zapomniany; Duke	before 1016 – 1038 or 1039	1034	1038 /1039	Semi-legendary, existence disputed	Piast	
Casimir I the Restorer: Polish: Kazimierz I Odnowiciel; Duke	25 June 1016 – 28 November 1058 (aged 42)	1039	1058	Son of Mieszko II and Richeza of Lotharingia	Piast	
Bolesław II the Generous: Polish: Bolesław II Szczodry	ca. 1041 or 1042 – 2 or 3 April 1081 or 1082	Duke: 1058; King: 1076	Duke: 1076; King: 1079	Son of Kazimierz I and Maria Dobroniega of Kiev	Piast	
Władysław I Herman: Duke	ca. 1044 – 4 June 1102	1079	1102	Son of Kazimierz I and Maria Dobroniega	Piast	
Zbigniew: Zbygniew; Duke	ca. 1073 – 8 July 1113	1102	1107	Son of Władysław I and Przecława of Prawdzic coat of arms (disputed). First jointly with Władysław I, 1098-1102	Piast	
Bolesław III Wrymouth: Polish: Bolesław III Krzywousty; Duke	20 August 1086 – 28 October 1138 (aged 52)	1107	1138	Son of Władysław I and Judith of Bohemia. First jointly with Władysław, 1098–1102. Introduced senioral principle	Piast	

=== Fragmentation of the Kingdom of Poland, 1138–1314 ===
==== Piast high dukes ====
Name	Lifespan	Reign start	Reign end	Notes	Family	Image
Władysław II the Exile: Polish: Władysław II Wygnaniec; High Duke Supreme Prince	1105 – 30 May 1159	1138	1146	Son of Bolesław III and Zbyslava of Kiev. Also the Duke of Silesia. Exiled by his brothers	Piast	
Bolesław IV the Curly: Polish: Bolesław Kędzierzawy; High Duke Supreme Prince	ca. 1125 – 5 January 1173	1146	1173	Son of Bolesław III and Salomea of Berg; Also the Duke of Masovia	Piast	
Mieszko III the Old: Polish: Mieszko III Stary; High Duke Supreme Prince	ca. 1127 – 13 March 1202	1173	1177	Son of Bolesław III and Salomea. Also the Duke of Greater Poland	Piast	
Casimir II the Just: Polish: Kazimierz II Sprawiedliwy; High Duke Supreme Prince	ca. 1138 – 5 May 1194	1177	1190	Son of Bolesław III and Salomea. Also the Duke of Wiślica and Sandomierz	Piast	
Mieszko III the Old: Polish: Mieszko III Stary; High Duke Supreme Prince	ca. 1127 – 13 March 1202	1190	1190	Restored	Piast	
Casimir II the Just: Polish: Kazimierz II Sprawiedliwy; High Duke Supreme Prince	ca. 1138 – 5 May 1194	1190	1194	Restored	Piast	
Leszek I the White: Polish: Leszek Biały; High Duke Supreme Prince	ca. 1186 – 24 November 1227	1194	1198	Son of Casimir II and Helen of Znojmo. Also the Duke of Sandomierz	Piast	
Mieszko III the Old: Polish: Mieszko III Stary; High Duke Supreme Prince	ca. 1127 – 13 March 1202	1198	1199	Restored	Piast	
Leszek I the White: Polish: Leszek Biały; High Duke Supreme Prince	ca. 1186 – 24 November 1227	1199	1199	Restored	Piast	
Mieszko III the Old: Polish: Mieszko III Stary; High Duke Supreme Prince	ca. 1127 – 13 March 1202	1199	1202	Restored	Piast	
Władysław III Spindleshanks: Polish: Władysław III Laskonogi; High Duke Supreme Prince	ca. 1161/1166 – 3 November 1231	1202	1202	Son of Mieszko III and Eudoxia of Kiev. Also the Duke of Greater Poland	Piast	
Leszek I the White: Polish: Leszek Biały; High Duke Supreme Prince	ca. 1186 – 24 November 1227	1202	1210	Restored	Piast	
Mieszko IV Tanglefoot: Polish: Mieszko I Plątonogi; High Duke Supreme Prince	ca. 1130 – 16 May 1211	1210	1211	Son of Władysław II and Agnes of Babenberg. Also the Duke of Silesia	Piast	
Leszek I the White: Polish: Leszek Biały; High Duke Supreme Prince	ca. 1186 – 24 November 1227	1211	1225	Restored	Piast	
Henry the Bearded: Polish: Henryk I Brodaty; High Duke Supreme Prince	ca. 1165 – 19 March 1238	1225	1225	Grandson of Władysław II, son of Bolesław I the Tall and Krystyna. Also the Duke of Silesia	Piast	
Leszek I the White: Polish: Leszek Biały; High Duke Supreme Prince	ca. 1186 – 24 November 1227	1225	1227	Restored. Assassinated	Piast	
Władysław III Spindleshanks: Polish: Władysław III Laskonogi; High Duke Supreme Prince	ca. 1161/1166 – 3 November 1231	1227	1229	Restored	Piast	
Konrad I of Masovia: Polish: Konrad I Mazowiecki; High Duke Supreme Prince	ca. 1187/1188 – 31 August 1247	1229	1232	Son of Kazimierz II and Helen of Znojmo. Also the Duke of Masovia	Piast	
Henryk I the Bearded: Polish: Henryk I Brodaty; High Duke Supreme Prince	ca. 1165 – 19 March 1238	1232	1238	Restored	Piast	
Henryk II the Pious: Polish: Henryk II Pobożny; High Duke Supreme Prince	ca. 1196 – 9 April 1241	1238	1241	Son of Henry I and Saint Hedwig of Andechs (Saint Hedwig of Silesia). Also the Duke of Wroclaw and Greater Poland. Fell at the Battle of Legnica	Piast	
Bolesław II the Horned: Bolesław II Rogatka; High Duke Supreme Prince	ca. 1220–1278	1241	1241	Son of Henry II and Anne of Bohemia. Also the Duke of Silesia	Piast	
Konrad I of Masovia: Polish: Konrad I Mazowiecki; High Duke Supreme Prince	ca. 1187/1188 – 31 August 1247	1241	1243	Restored	Piast	
Bolesław V the Chaste: Polish: Bolesław Wstydliwy; High Duke Supreme Prince	21 June 1226 – 7 December 1279	1243	1279	Son of Leszek the White and Grzymislawa of Luck	Piast	
Leszek II the Black: Polish: Leszek Czarny; High Duke Supreme Prince	ca. 1241 – 30 September 1288	1279	1288	Grandson of Konrad I of Masovia. Maternal grandson of Henry II. Son of Casimir I of Kuyavia and Constance of Wrocław	Piast	
Bolesław II of Masovia: Boleslaw II of Płock; High Duke Supreme Prince	ca. 1251 – 20 April 1313	1288	1288	Grandson of Konrad I of Masovia. Duke of Masovia	Piast	
Henryk IV Probus: Polish: Henryk IV Prawy; High Duke Supreme Prince	ca. 1257/1258 – 23 June 1290	1288	1289	Paternal grandson of Henryk II. Maternal grandson of Konrad I. Son of Henry III the White and Judyta of Masovia. Duke of Lower Silesia	Piast	
Bolesław II of Masovia: Boleslaw II of Płock; High Duke Supreme Prince	ca. 1251 – 20 April 1313	1289	1289	Restored	Piast	
Władysław I Łokietek: Polish: Władysław I Łokietek; High Duke Supreme Prince	1261 – 2 March 1333	1289	1289	Grandson of Konrad I of Masovia. Son of Kazimierz I of Kujawia and Euphrosyne of Opole	Piast	
Henry Probus: Polish: Henryk IV Prawy; High Duke Supreme Prince	ca. 1257/1258 – 23 June 1290	1289	1290	Restored	Piast	

==== Reunification attempts in the Kingdom of Poland 1232–1305 ====
===== Piast kings =====
Name	Lifespan	Reign start	Reign end	Notes	Family	Image
Przemysł II: Premyslas, Premislaus	14 October 1257 – 8 February 1296 (aged 38)	High Duke: 1290; King: 1295	High Duke: 1291; King: 1296	Grandson of Henryk II. Son of Przemysł I and Elisabeth of Wrocław. Also the Duke of Poznań, Greater Poland and Pomerania	Piast	

===== Přemyslid kings =====
Name	Lifespan	Reign start	Reign end	Notes	Family	Image
Wenceslaus II of Bohemia: Polish: Wacław II Czeski	27 September 1271 – 21 June 1305 (aged 33)	High Duke: 1291; King: 1300	High Duke: 1300; King: 1305	Son of Ottokar II of Bohemia and Kunigunda of Slavonia. Married Przemysł II's daughter Elisabeth Richeza of Poland. Also the King of Bohemia	Přemyslid	
Wenceslaus III of Bohemia: Polish: Wacław III Czeski	6 October 1289 – 4 August 1306 (aged 16)	1305	1306	Son of Wenceslaus II and Judith of Habsburg. Uncrowned. Assassinated	Přemyslid	

=== Reunited Kingdom of Poland, 1314–1569 ===
==== Piast kings ====
Name	Lifespan	Reign start	Reign end	Notes	Family	Image
Władysław I Łokietek: English: Władysław I the Elbow-high	1261 – 2 March 1333	1320	1333	Restored. Reunited the Kingdom of Poland	Piast	
Casimir III the Great: Polish: Kazimierz III Wielki	30 April 1310 – 5 November 1370 (aged 60)	1333	1370	Son of Władysław I Łokietek and Jadwiga of Kalisz. Regarded as one of the greatest Polish monarchs	Piast	

==== Anjou kings ====
Name	Lifespan	Reign start	Reign end	Notes	Family	Image
Louis I of Hungary: Polish: Ludwik Węgierski	5 March 1326 – 10 September 1382 (aged 56)	1370	1382	Son of Charles I of Hungary and Elizabeth of Poland. Nephew of Casimir III. Elected king and crowned on 17 November. Also the King of Hungary	Anjou	
Jadwiga of Poland: Polish: Jadwiga Andegaweńska	1373/1374 – 17 July 1399	16 October 1384	17 July 1399	Daughter of Louis I and Elizabeth of Bosnia. Crowned king to emphasise her monarchical status, 1384. Reigned jointly with her husband Władysław II Jagiełło from 1386	Anjou	

==== Jagiellonian kings ====
Name	Lifespan	Reign start	Reign end	Notes	Family	Image
Władysław II Jagiełło: King of Poland King	ca. 1351/1362 – 1 June 1434	4 March 1386	1 June 1434	Son of Algirdas of Lithuania and Uliana of Tver. Grand Duke of Lithuania, 1377–1434. Reigned jointly with his wife Jadwiga till 1399. Longest-reigning King of Poland	Jagiellonian	
Władysław III of Poland: Władysław III of Varna, Władysław Warneńczyk; King of Poland King	31 October 1424 – 10 November 1444 (aged 20)	25 July 1434	10 November 1444	Son of Władysław II Jagiełło and Sophia of Halshany. Also, the king of Hungary, as Ulászló I. Fell at the Battle of Varna, in Bulgaria, hence called "of Varna"	Jagiellonian	
Casimir IV Jagiellon: Kazimierz IV Jagiellończyk; King of Poland King	30 November 1427 – 7 June 1492 (aged 64)	25 June 1447	7 June 1492	Son of Władysław II and Sophia of Halshany. Also, the Grand Duke of Lithuania, 1440–1492. His successful reign ended in the final destruction of the Teutonic Knights.	Jagiellonian	
John I Albert: Jan I Olbracht; King of Poland King	27 December 1459 – 17 June 1501 (aged 41)	23 September 1492	16 June 1501	Son of Casimir IV and Elisabeth of Austria	Jagiellonian	
Alexander Jagiellon: Aleksander I Jagiellończyk; King of Poland King	5 August 1461 – 19 August 1506 (aged 45)	12 December 1501	19 August 1506	Son of Casimir IV and Elisabeth of Austria. Also, the Grand Duke of Lithuania, 1492–1506	Jagiellonian	
Sigismund I the Old: Zygmunt I Stary; King of Poland King	1 January 1467 – 1 April 1548 (aged 81)	8 December 1506	1 April 1548	Son of Casimir IV and Elisabeth of Austria. Also, the Grand Duke of Lithuania. Forced Prussian Homage in 1525. Annexed the Duchy of Masovia in 1526. Entered an alliance with Maximilian I, Holy Roman Emperor	Jagiellonian	
Sigismund II Augustus: Zygmunt II August; King of Poland King	1 August 1520 – 7 July 1572 (aged 51)	18 December 1529	7 July 1572	Son of Sigismund I and Bona Sforza. Also, the Grand Duke of Lithuania. Co-ruler with his father, 1529–1548. Replaced the personal union of the Kingdom of Poland and the Grand Duchy of Lithuania with a real union and an elective monarchy (Polish–Lithuanian Commonwealth) in 1569	Jagiellonian	

== Polish–Lithuanian Commonwealth (1569–1795) ==
Name	Lifespan	Reign start	Reign end	Notes	Family	Image
Henry III of France: Henryk Walezy; King of Poland King	19 September 1551 – 2 August 1589 (aged 37)	21 February 1574	12 May 1575	Son of Henry II of France and Catherine de' Medici. Abandoned the Polish throne three months after his coronation in order to become King of France	Valois	
Anna Jagiellon: Anna Jagiellonka; King of Poland King	18 October 1523 – 9 September 1596 (aged 72)	15 December 1575	12 December 1586	Daughter of Sigismund I and Bona Sforza. Reigned together with her husband, Stephen Báthory	Jagiellonian	
Stephen Báthory: Stefan Batory; King of Poland King	27 September 1533 – 12 December 1586 (aged 53)	15 December 1575	12 December 1586	Son of Stephen VIII Báthory and Catherine Telegdi. Prince of Transylvania. Reigned together with his wife Anna Jagiellon	Báthory	
Sigismund III Vasa: Zygmunt III Waza; King of Poland King	20 June 1566 – 30 April 1632 (aged 65)	18 September 1587	19 April 1632	Grandson of Sigismund I. Son of John III of Sweden and Catherine Jagiellon. Also King of Sweden 1592-1599, titular King 1599–1632. During his reign, Polish troops captured Moscow. Moved the capital from Kraków to Warsaw	Vasa	
Władysław IV Vasa: Władysław IV Waza; King of Poland King	9 June 1595 – 20 May 1648 (aged 52)	8 November 1632	20 May 1648	Son of Sigismund III and Anne of Austria. Titular Tsar of Russia 1610–1634, titular King of Sweden 1632–1648	Vasa	
John II Casimir Vasa: Jan II Kazimierz; King of Poland King	22 March 1609 – 16 December 1672 (aged 63)	20 November 1648	16 September 1668	Son of Sigismund III and Constance of Austria. Titular King of Sweden 1648-1660. Abdicated	Vasa	
Michał Korybut Wiśniowiecki: Michał Korybut Wiśniowiecki; King of Poland King	May 31, 1640 – November 10, 1673 (aged 33)	19 June 1669	10 November 1673	Son of Jeremi Wiśniowiecki, a military commander, and Gryzelda Konstancja Zamoyska	Wiśniowiecki	
John III Sobieski: Jan III Sobieski; King of Poland King	17 August 1629 – 17 June 1696 (aged 66)	21 May 1674	17 June 1696	Son of Jakub Sobieski and Zofia Teofillia Daniłowicz. Known for his victory over the Turks at the Battle of Vienna in 1683	Sobieski	
Augustus II the Strong: August II Mocny; King of Poland King	12 May 1670 – 1 February 1733 (aged 62)	15 September 1697	16 February 1704 (deposed); 24 September 1706 (abdicates)	Son of John George III and Anna Sophie of Denmark. Elector of Saxony as Frederick Augustus I, 1694–1733	Wettin	
Stanisław Leszczyński: Stanisław Leszczyński; King of Poland King	20 October 1677 – 23 February 1766 (aged 88)	4 October 1705	8 August 1709	Son of Rafał Leszczyński and Anna Leszczyńska. Yielded to Augustus II	Leszczyński	
Augustus II the Strong: August II Mocny; King of Poland King	12 May 1670 – 1 February 1733 (aged 62)	8 August 1709	1 February 1733	Restored	Wettin	
Stanisław Leszczyński: Stanisław Leszczyński; King of Poland King	20 October 1677 – 23 February 1766 (aged 88)	12 September 1733	30 June 1734 (deposed); 27 January 1736 (abdicates)	Restored. Defeated in the War of the Polish Succession. Became Duke of Lorraine until his death	Leszczyński	
Augustus III of Poland: August III Sas; King of Poland King	17 October 1696 – 5 October 1763 (aged 66)	17 January 1734 (in opposition); 30 June 1734 (effectively)	5 October 1763	Son of Augustus II and Christiane Eberhardine of Brandenburg-Bayreuth	Wettin	
Stanisław August Poniatowski: Stanisław August Poniatowski; King of Poland King	17 January 1732 – 12 February 1798 (aged 66)	25 November 1764	7 January 1795	Son of Stanisław Poniatowski and Konstancja Czartoryska. Forced to abdicate when the Polish–Lithuanian Commonwealth (a hereditary monarchy since Constitution of 3 May 1791) ceased to exist	Poniatowski	

== Duchy of Warsaw (1807–1815) ==
Name	Lifespan	Reign start	Reign end	Notes	Family	Image
Frederick Augustus I of Saxony: Fryderyk August I; Duke	23 December 1750 – 5 May 1827 (aged 76)	9 June 1807	22 May 1815	Son of Frederick Christian, Elector of Saxony and Duchess Maria Antonia of Bavaria. Duke of Warsaw. Designated as King of Poland by the General Confederation of the Kingdom of Poland in 1812	Wettin	

== Kings of the Congress Kingdom of Poland in the Russian Empire (1815–1917) ==
Ruler	Dynasty	Reign start	Reign end	Notes
Alexander I (Aleksander I/II)	Holstein-Gottorp-Romanov	9 June 1815	1 December 1825	The Kingdom of Poland created at the Congress of Vienna and therefore dubbed "Congress Poland".
Nicholas I (Mikołaj I)	Holstein-Gottorp-Romanov	1 December 1825	2 March 1855	Deposed by the Polish Parliament (Sejm) on 25 January 1831 during the November Uprising (1830–1831), autonomy was abolished in 1832.
Alexander II (Aleksander II/III)	Holstein-Gottorp-Romanov	2 March 1855	13 March 1881	The Kingdom of Poland was annexed into the Russian Empire after the January Uprising (1863–1864) and the name of the kingdom was changed to Vistula Land (1867–1915)
Alexander III (Aleksander III/IV)	Holstein-Gottorp-Romanov	13 March 1881	1 November 1894	
Nicholas II (Mikołaj II)	Holstein-Gottorp-Romanov	1 November 1894	15 March 1917	Abdicated in 1917

== Republic of Poland (1918–1939) ==
=== Chief of State ===
Portrait	Name (Birth–Death)	Entered office	Left office	Political party	Notes
–	Józef Piłsudski (1867–1935)	14 November 1918	11 December 1922	Independent	Provisional Chief of State until 1918

=== President of the Republic ===
Portrait	Name (Birth–Death)	Entered office	Left office	Political party	Election	Notes
1	Gabriel Narutowicz (1865–1922)	11 December 1922	16 December 1922 (Assassinated)	Independent supported by Polish People's Party "Wyzwolenie"	Dec 1922 (I)	First President of Poland. Assassinated after only 5 days in office
–	Maciej Rataj (1884–1940); Acting President	16 December 1922	22 December 1922	Polish People's Party "Piast"	—	Marshal of the Sejm
2	Stanisław Wojciechowski (1869–1953)	22 December 1922	14 May 1926 (Deposed)	Polish People's Party "Piast"	Dec 1922 (II)	Deposed in the May Coup by Marshal Józef Piłsudski
–	Maciej Rataj (1884–1940); Acting President	14 May 1926	4 June 1926	Polish People's Party "Piast"	—	Marshal of the Sejm
–	Józef Piłsudski (1867–1935) President-elect	Did not take office		Independent	May 1926	Piłsudski was elected President by the National Assembly but declined to take office.
3	Ignacy Mościcki (1867–1946)	4 June 1926	30 September 1939	Independent supported by Nonpartisan Bloc for Cooperation with the Government	Jun 1926 1933	Mościcki's government was exiled to Romania after Poland's defeat in World War II on 17 September.

== Government of the Republic of Poland in Exile (1939–1990) ==
After the German conquest of Poland, a Polish government-in-exile was formed under the protection of France and Britain. The President of the Republic and the government-in-exile were recognised by the United Kingdom and, later, by the United States until 6 July 1945, when the Western Allies accepted the Communist-led government backed by Joseph Stalin. Despite having lost recognition by other governments, the government-in-exile continued in London until the election of Lech Wałęsa as President of the Republic of Poland in December 1990, upon which it handed over its formal powers and the insignia of the Polish Second Republic to President-elect Wałęsa in a ceremony at the Warsaw Royal Castle on 22 December 1990.

The sole internationally recognised president of the exiled government was Władysław Raczkiewicz, who took office after Ignacy Mościcki's resignation in September 1939.

Portrait	Name (Birth–Death)	Entered office	Left office	Political party	Notes
1	Władysław Raczkiewicz (1885–1947)	30 September 1939	6 June 1947 (Died in office)	Independent	Raczkiewicz's government lost recognition by the Western Allies on 6 July 1945.
2	August Zaleski (1883–1972)	9 June 1947	7 April 1972 (Died in office)	Independent	From 1954 onwards, opposed by the Rada Trzech (Council of Three)
3	Stanisław Ostrowski (1892–1982)	9 April 1972	24 March 1979	Independent	
4	Edward Raczyński (1891–1993)	8 April 1979	8 April 1986	Independent	
5	Kazimierz Sabbat (1913–1989)	8 April 1986	19 July 1989 (Died in office)	Independent	
6	Ryszard Kaczorowski (1919–2010)	19 July 1989	22 December 1990	Independent	Kaczorowski resigned on 22 December 1990, upon the election of Lech Wałęsa as President of the Republic of Poland.

== Polish People's Republic (1944–1989) ==
=== President of the State National Council ===
The Provisional Government of the Republic of Poland was founded under Soviet protection on 31 December 1944 and recognised by the United States and the United Kingdom since 6 July 1945. It evolved into the Government of National Unity on 28 June 1945, and eventually into the Polish People's Republic on 19 February 1947.

Portrait	Name (Birth–Death)	Entered office	Left office	Political party	Notes
1	Bolesław Bierut (1892–1956)	31 December 1943	4 February 1947	Polish Workers' Party	

=== President of the Republic ===
Portrait	Name (Birth–Death)	Entered office	Left office	Political party	Election	Notes
–	Franciszek Trąbalski (1870–1964); Acting	4 February 1947		Polish Socialist Party	—	
–	Władysław Kowalski (1894–1958); Acting	4 February 1947	5 February 1947	Polish Workers' Party	—	Marshal of the Sejm
1	Bolesław Bierut (1892–1956)	5 February 1947	20 November 1952	Polish Workers' Party/ Polish United Workers' Party	1947	From December 1948, also Secretary General of the Polish United Workers' Party

=== Chairman of the Council of State ===
In 1952, the July Constitution abolished the office of president and made the Council of State the collective head of state, chairmen of which are listed below. Real power rested with the Polish United Workers' Party (PZPR), its Central Committee, and the secretary general/first secretary.

Portrait	Name (Birth–Death)	Entered office	Left office	Political party	Notes
1	Aleksander Zawadzki (1899–1964)	20 November 1952	7 August 1964 (Died in office)	Polish United Workers' Party	Died in office (cancer)
In accordance with the constitution, the vice presidents of the Council of State, Edward Ochab, Stanisław Kulczyński, Oskar R. Lange, and Bolesław Podedworny, became collegially acting heads of state.
2	Edward Ochab (1906–1989)	12 August 1964	10 April 1968	Polish United Workers' Party	
3	Marian Spychalski (1906–1980)	10 April 1968	23 December 1970	Polish United Workers' Party	
4	Józef Cyrankiewicz (1911–1989)	23 December 1970	28 March 1972	Polish United Workers' Party	
5	Henryk Jabłoński (1909–2003)	28 March 1972	6 November 1985	Polish United Workers' Party	
6	Wojciech Jaruzelski (1923–2014)	6 November 1985	19 July 1989	Polish United Workers' Party	Also the First Secretary of the Polish United Workers' Party

=== First Secretaries of the Polish Workers' Party (PPR)/Polish United Workers' Party (PZPR) ===
Since 1954, the head of the party was also the Chairman of the Central Committee.

Name (Birth–Death)	Portrait	Entered office	Left office	Position
Władysław Gomułka (1905–1982)		23 November 1943	10 August 1948	First Secretary of PPR
Bolesław Bierut (1892–1956)		10 August 1948	12 March 1956 (Died in office)	First Secretary of PPR to 16 December 1948; First Secretary of PZPR from 22 December 1948
Edward Ochab (1906–1989)		20 March 1956	21 October 1956	First Secretary of PZPR
Władysław Gomułka (1905–1982)		21 October 1956	20 December 1970	First Secretary of PZPR
Edward Gierek (1913–2001)		20 December 1970	6 September 1980	First Secretary of PZPR
Stanisław Kania (1927–2020)		6 September 1980	18 October 1981	First Secretary of PZPR
Wojciech Jaruzelski (1923–2014)		18 October 1981	29 July 1989	First Secretary of PZPR
Mieczysław Rakowski* (1926–2008)		29 July 1989	29 January 1990	First Secretary of PZPR

- By the second half of 1989, the office of First Secretary, occupied at the time by Mieczysław Rakowski, ceased to hold any real power.

== Republic of Poland (1989–present) ==
=== President of the Republic ===
	Portrait	Name (Birth–Death)	Entered office	Left office	Political party	Election	Notes Previous office
1		Wojciech Jaruzelski (1923–2014)	19 July 1989	22 December 1990 (Resigned)	Polish United Workers' Party (to 30 January 1990)	1989	Following the Polish Round Table Agreement between the Polish United Workers' Party and Solidarity, the Council of State was abolished. Its chairman was elected President of the People's Republic by the Parliament.
2		Lech Wałęsa (born 1943)	22 December 1990	22 December 1995	Independent (Solidarity Citizens' Committee)	1990	First president elected by popular vote.
3		Aleksander Kwaśniewski (born 1954)	23 December 1995	23 December 2005	Democratic Left Alliance	1995 2000	Member of the Sejm (1991–95). First President of the Third Republic elected twice.
4		Lech Kaczyński (1949–2010)	23 December 2005	10 April 2010 (Died in office)	Law and Justice	2005	Senator (1989–91); Member of the Sejm (1991–93 and 2001–02); Mayor of Warsaw (2002-05). Died in a plane crash.
–		Bronisław Komorowski (born 1952); Acting President	10 April 2010	8 July 2010	Civic Platform	—	Marshal of the Sejm (2007–10). Resigned as Marshal of the Sejm, and thus as Acting President, after being confirmed as the winner of the 2010 presidential election.
–		Bogdan Borusewicz (born 1949); Acting President	8 July 2010	8 July 2010	Civic Platform	—	Marshal of the Senate (2005–15). Acting president for less than a day, between Komorowski's resignation as the Marshal of the Sejm and Grzegorz Schetyna being sworn in.
–		Grzegorz Schetyna (born 1963); Acting President	8 July 2010	6 August 2010	Civic Platform	—	Marshal of the Sejm (2010–11). Served as Acting President until Komorowski was sworn in as president as the result of the 2010 presidential election.
5		Bronisław Komorowski (born 1952)	6 August 2010	6 August 2015	Civic Platform	2010	Member of the Sejm (1991–2010); Marshal of the Sejm (2007–10); Acting President (2010).
6		Andrzej Duda (born 1972)	6 August 2015	6 August 2025	Law and Justice	2015 2020	Member of the Sejm (2011–14); Member of the European Parliament (2014–15); Duda was the Law and Justice candidate in the 2015 election, but resigned his membership on 26 May 2015.
7		Karol Nawrocki (born 1983)	6 August 2025	Incumbent	Independent (Law and Justice)	2025	Director of the Museum of the Second World War (2017–21); President of the Institute of National Remembrance (2021–25).

== See also ==
- List of Polish monarchs
- Prime Minister of Poland
  - List of prime ministers of Poland
