= List of Polish monarchs =

Monarchy of Poland
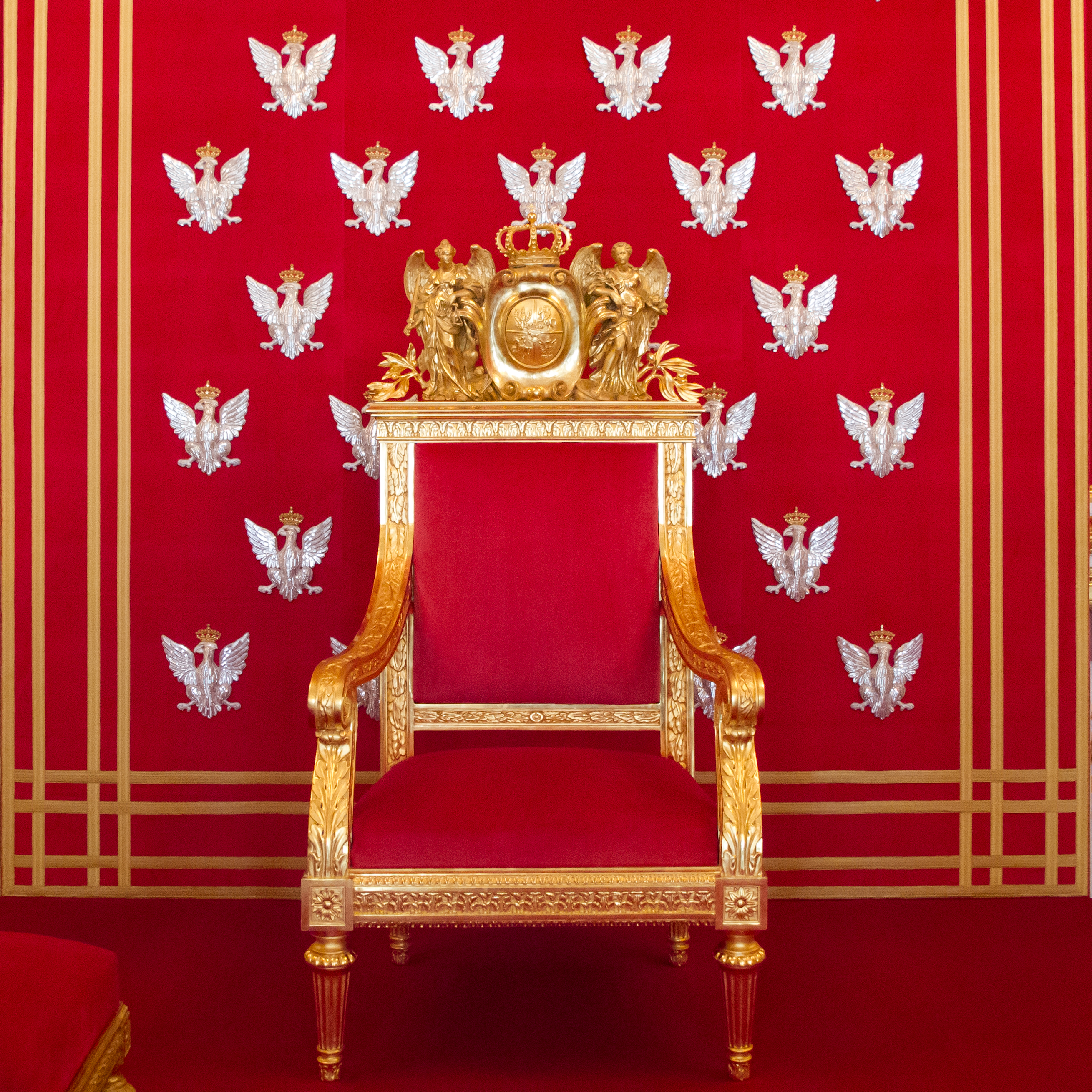
- The throne at Warsaw's Royal Castle

Details
- Style: Royal Majesty (HRM) Wasza Królewska Mość; Serene Reigning Majesty Jaśnie Panujący Mości; Grace (HG) Wasza Miłość; Highness (HH) Wasza Wysokość
- First monarch: Mieszko I (as Duke); Bolesław I the Brave (as King)
- Last monarch: Stanisław August Poniatowski
- Formed: c. 960 (Duchy of Poland)
- Abolished: 25 November 1795
- Residences: Wawel Castle; Warsaw Castle; Wilanów Palace
- Appointer: Hereditary (until 1399) (Note: The throne of Poland was hereditary until 1399; Jadwiga was the last hereditary monarch, see Borkowska, Urszula (2012). Dynastia Jagiellonów w Polsce. PWN. p. 79, 481. "Jadwiga Anjou was considered the last 'naturally-enthroned Lady' of the Kingdom of Poland. In Jagiellonian times, in the politics of Corona Regni Poloniae, the persona of the monarch became separated from the country they were ruling. The throne became elective, although the choice of the next ruler was restricted to the members of the [Jagiellonian] dynasty, as long as it had heirs." "Jadwiga (...) became the wife of Jagiełło, who was crowned the King (...), as co-ruler alongside Jadwiga, the last hereditary monarch of Poland."); Elective (1399–1795)

Poland was ruled at various times either by dukes and princes (10th to 14th centuries) or by kings (11th to 18th centuries). During the latter period, kings were elected by the nobility (14th to 18th centuries).

Duke Mieszko I adopted Christianity under the authority of Rome in the year 966. He was succeeded by his son, Bolesław I the Brave, who greatly expanded the boundaries of the Polish state and ruled as the first king in 1025. The following centuries gave rise to the mighty Piast dynasty, consisting of both kings such as Mieszko II Lambert, Przemysł II or Władysław I the Elbow-high and dukes like Bolesław III Wrymouth. The dynasty's rule over Poland ceased with the death of Casimir III the Great in 1370. In the same year, the Capetian House of Anjou became the ruling house with Louis I of Hungary as king of both Poland and Hungary. His daughter, Jadwiga, later married Jogaila, the pagan Grand Duke of Lithuania, who in 1386 was baptised and crowned as Władysław II Jagiełło. After Jadwiga had died in 1399 without surviving children, the Polish hereditary monarchy ended. Władysław remained on the throne as elected king. His descendants continued to be chosen as monarchs by noblemen, creating the Jagiellonian dynasty, and during this time, a personal union between Poland and Lithuania took place.

During the reign of Casimir IV Jagiellon and Sigismund I the Old, culture flourished and cities developed. This era of progress, also known as the Polish Renaissance, continued until the Union of Lublin under Sigismund II Augustus, which unofficially marked the end of the Polish Golden Age. After the death of the last Jagiellonian king, the united Polish–Lithuanian Commonwealth continued the policy of elective monarchy, with mostly foreigners elected as monarchs, such as Henry III of France, who witnessed the introduction of the Golden Liberty system, and Stephen Báthory, a capable military commander who strengthened the nation. The Vasa dynasty, which descended from the Jagiellons, initially expanded the Polish–Lithuanian Commonwealth as the arts and crafts developed, as well as trade and commerce. King Sigismund III Vasa, a talented but somewhat despotic ruler, involved the country in many wars, which subsequently resulted in the successful capture of Moscow and the loss of Livonia to Sweden. His son, Władysław IV Vasa, fiercely defended the Commonwealth's borders and continued the policy of his father until his death, unlike John II Casimir, whose tragic rule resulted in his abdication.

The election of John III Sobieski to the Polish throne proved to be beneficial for the Commonwealth. A brilliant military tactician, John III led the coalition forces to victory at Vienna in 1683 and he partially recaptured land from the Ottoman Empire. However, in the following years, the contested rule of the Wettin dynasty (Augustus II the Strong and Augustus III of Poland) placed the Commonwealth under the influence of Saxony and the Russian Empire. Additional feuds with rebel nobility (szlachta) and most notably Stanislaus I Leszczyński and France diminished the influence of Poland–Lithuania in the region, which led to the partitions that occurred under King Stanisław August Poniatowski, yet another enlightened but ineffective monarch.

During the Napoleonic Wars, Frederick Augustus I of Saxony, ruled as Duke of Warsaw and attempted to rehabilitate the Polish state. After the Congress of Vienna, the territory of Poland was again divided by the Prussia (with the Prussian King as Grand Duke of Posen), Russia (Congress Poland was founded in 1815 with the Emperor of Russia as King of Poland) and Austria (with the Austrian Emperors as Kings of Galicia and Lodomeria). A new Kingdom of Poland was proclaimed as an independent state in 1916 with a Regency Council but the monarchy was abolished and a parliamentary republican authority was established when Poland was re-constituted as a sovereign state in 1918.

== Legendary ==
Most of the legendary Polish rulers appear for the first time in chronicles from the 13th century and their existence has not been determined.

Name	Portrait	Birth	Marriage(s)	Death	Claim	House
Lech I	Imaginary depiction of Lech in Chronica Polonorum	Unknown	Unknown	Unknown	Legendary founder of the Polish nation according to folktales, tribal leader	Lechites (Tribe)
Krakus also Krak or Grakch – c. 8th century	Imaginary depiction of Krakus in Chronica Polonorum	c. 8th century	Unknown	c. 8th century	Legendary founder of Kraków	Lechites (Tribe)
Krakus II – c. 8th century		c. 8th century Son of Krakus	Unknown	c. 8th century	Succession	Lechites (Tribe)
Lech II – c. 8th century	Imaginary depiction of Lech II in Chronica Polonorum	c. 8th century Son of Krakus I, brother of Krakus II	Unknown	c. 8th century	Succession	Lechites (Tribe)
Wanda also Wąda – c. 8th century	Imaginary depiction of Wanda in Chronica Polonorum	c. 8th century Daughter of Krakus, sister of Krakus II and Lech II	Unmarried and childless	c. 8th century	Succession	Lechites (Tribe)
Duke; Leszko I also Leszek c. 7th centuries – c. 8th centuries	Imaginary depiction of Leszko I in Sarmatiae Europeae descriptio by Alexander Guagnini	c. 7th centuries – c. 8th centuries	Unknown	c. 7th centuries – c. 8th centuries	Birth name Przemysław, defeated the Hungarians and was crowned Elected	Goplans and Polans (Tribes)
Duke; Leszko II – c. 8th century	Imaginary depiction of Leszko II in Sarmatiae Europeae descriptio by Alexander Guagnini	c. 8th centuries Presumed son of Leszko I, Alleged progenitor of the Popielids dynasty	Unknown	c. 8th centuries	Succession	Popielids
Duke; Leszko III – c. 8th century	Imaginary depiction of Leszko III in Sarmatiae Europeae descriptio by Alexander Guagnini	c. 8th centuries Presumed son of Leszko II	Unknown	c. 8th centuries	Succession	Popielids
Duke; Popiel I – c. 8th century	Imaginary depiction of Popiel in Chronica Polonorum	c. 8th centuries Presumed son of Leszko III	Unknown	c. 8th centuries	Succession	Popielids
Duke; Popiel II – c. 9th century	Imaginary depiction of Popiel in Sarmatiae Europeae descriptio by Alexander Guagnini	c. 9th century	(1) NN, A German Princess	c. 9th century	A legendary ruler was dethroned by Piast. He appears (without the number) in the oldest Polish chronicle, Gesta principum Polonorum from the early 12th century Succession	Popielids
Piast the Wheelwright – c. 9th century	Imaginary depiction of Piast the Wheelwright by Walery Eljasz Radzikowski	c. 9th century Son of Chościsko	(1) Rzepicha; 1 child	c. 9th century	Legendary founder of the Piast dynasty. He appears in the oldest Polish chronicle, Gesta principum Polonorum from the early 12th century	Piast

== House of Piast ==
The three direct predecessors of Mieszko I are known only from the account of Gallus Anonymus, who wrote the oldest Polish chronicle, Gesta principum Polonorum at the beginning of the 12th century. Though their historicity was once debatable, now historians tend to consider them as actually existing rulers.

Name	Portrait	Birth	Marriage(s)	Death	Claim	House	Ref.
Duke; Siemowit also Ziemowit – 9th century	Imaginary depiction of Siemowit by Walery Eljasz-Radzikowski	9th century Presumed son of Piast the Wheelwright and Rzepicha	Unknown	9th century	Named Duke of the Polans after his father, Piast the Wheelwright, refused to take the place of legendary Duke Popiel Elected	Piast	
Duke; Lestek also Leszek or Lestko; 9th century – 10th century	Imaginary depiction of Lestek by Walery Eljasz-Radzikowski	c. 870 – 880; Presumed son of Siemowit	Unknown	c. 930 – 950	Named Duke of the Polans after succeeding his father Succession	Piast	
Duke; Siemomysł also Ziemomysł; Latin: Zemomislaus; 10th century – c. 950/960	Imaginary depiction of Siemomysł by Walery Eljasz-Radzikowski	c. 900; Presumed son of Lestek	Unknown	c. 950 – 960	Named Duke of the Polans after succeeding his father Succession	Piast	

Mieszko I started his reign as leader of the Polans, while other parts of future Poland were settled by other tribes, such as Masovians, Vistulans, Lendians, Silesians or Pomeranians. During his reign, Mieszko united Polish lands and adopted Christianity, connecting Poland with western Europe. His descendants ruled the state as natural lords and Poland was seen as their hereditary property. Because of that, the state was often divided between the sons of the deceased ruler and eventually united by one of them. Early Polish rulers were not considered equal to Western European kings, so their title is translated as a duke. Some of them managed to prepare a coronation and adopted the title of king, but the effects of those efforts were short lived.

Name	Portrait	Birth	Marriage(s)	Death	Claim	House
Duke; Mieszko I Latin: Misico, dux Wandalorum c. 960 – 25 May 992 (31–32 years)		c. 930 Son of semi-legendary Siemomysł	(1) Doubravka of Bohemia; 1 child (2) Oda of Haldensleben; 3 or 4 children	25 May 992; Poznań; Aged about 62	First Christian ruler of Poland Succession	Piast
King; Bolesław I the Brave also Boleslaus I the Great; Polish: Bolesław I Chrobry (Wielki); 992 – 1025 (as duke) 18 April 1025 – 17 June 1025 (as king) (32–33 years)		c. 967; Poznań Son of Mieszko I and Doubravka of Bohemia	(1) Unknown, daughter of Rikdag (2) Unnamed Hungarian; 1 child (3) Emnilda of Lusatia; 5 children (4) Oda of Meissen; 1 child	17 June 1025; Kraków; Aged about 58	First crowned king Succession	Piast
King; Mieszko II Lambert; 25 December 1025 – 1031 (5–6 years)	Mieszko II Lambert receiving a liturgical book from Matilda of Swabia	c. 990 Son of Bolesław I the Brave and Emnilda of Lusatia	(1) Richeza of Lotharingia; 4 children	10/11 May 1034; Poznań; Aged about 44	Crowned king Succession Deposed by Bezprym	Piast
Duke; Bezprym; 1031 – 1032 (0–1 years)		c. 986 Son of Bolesław I the Brave and Judith of Hungary	Unknown	c. 1032; Aged about 46	Usurped	Piast
Duke; Otto; 1032 – 1033 (0–1 years)		c. 1000 Son of Bolesław I the Brave and Emnilda of Lusatia	Unknown	c. 1033; Aged about 33	Country divided, ruler of a Duchy	Piast
Duke; Dytryk also Dietrich and Theoderick; 1032 – 1033 (0–1 years)		c. 992 Son of Lambert Mieszkowic or Mieszko Mieszkowic	Unknown	c. 1033; Aged about 41	Country divided, ruler of a Duchy	Piast
Duke; Mieszko II Lambert; 1032 – 1034 (1–2 years)	Mieszko II Lambert	c. 990 Son of Bolesław I the Brave and Emnilda of Lusatia	(1) Richeza of Lotharingia; 4 children	10/11 May 1034; Poznań; Aged about 44	Country divided until 1033 Restored as duke	Piast
King; Bolesław the Forgotten; Polish: Bolesław Zapomniany; 1034 – 1038/1039 (4–5 years)		before 1016 Presumed son of Mieszko II Lambert	Unknown	1038/1039	Semi-legendary, existence disputed	Piast
Duke; Casimir I the Restorer; Polish: Kazimierz I Odnowiciel; 1034/1040 – 1058 (17–18 years)		25 July 1016 Son of Mieszko II Lambert and Richeza of Lotharingia	(1) Maria Dobroniega; 5 children	19 March 1058; Poznań; Aged 41	Made prince in 1034, returned from abroad in 1040 Restoration	Piast
King; Bolesław II the Generous; Polish: Bolesław II Szczodry (Śmiały); 1058 – 1076 (as duke); 26 December 1076 – 1079 (as king) (20–21 years)		1042 Son of Casimir I the Restorer and Maria Dobroniega of Kiev	(1) Unknown; 1 child	2/3 April 1081; Hungary or Ossiach; Aged about 39	Crowned king in 1076 Deposed and exiled in 1079 after slaying Stanislaus of Szczepanów	Piast
Duke; Władysław I Herman; 1079 – 4 June 1102 (22–23 years)		1044 Son of Casimir I the Restorer and Maria Dobroniega of Kiev	(1) Unknown; 1 child (2) Judith of Bohemia; 1 child (3) Judith of Swabia; 3 children	24 June 1102; Płock; Aged about 58	Succeeded brother after his exile	Piast
Duke; Zbigniew (duke of Poland); 1102 – 1107 (4–5 years)		c. 1073 Son of Władysław I Herman and Przecława (?)	Unknown	8 July 1113; Aged about 40	Country divided, ruler of a Duchy Succession	Piast
Duke; Bolesław III Wrymouth also Boleslaus III; Polish: Bolesław III Wrymouth; 1102 – 1138 (35–36 years)		20 August 1086; Płock Son of Władysław I Herman and Judith of Bohemia	(1) Zbyslava of Kiev; 1 child (2) Salomea of Berg; 12 children	28 October 1138; Sochaczew; Aged 52	Country divided until 1107 Succession His death led to the fragmentation of Poland	Piast

=== Fragmentation of Poland (1138–1320) ===
After a period of fights between brothers and unstable inheritance, Bolesław III Wrymouth decided to formalize succession. According to his testament, the state was divided into provinces – one for every son and a Senioral Province with the capital city Kraków. The testament established two principles on which the new order in Poland was based: principate and seniorate. One duke, the princeps (also called in English high duke), had supreme authority over other dukes and ruled the senioral province. This princeps should be the oldest member of the dynasty, not necessarily the son of the predecessor. During the time of fragmentation, both principles were abolished. Seniorate was formally abolished in 1180 during the assembly of dukes and bishops in Łęczyca, when Casimir II the Just was made hereditary high duke. The Principate was de facto ended in 1227 with the assassination of Leszek I the White, after which local dukes no longer respected suzerainty of the high duke.

Name	Portrait	Birth	Marriage(s)	Death	Claim	House
High Duke; Władysław II the Exile; Polish: Władysław II Wygnaniec; 1138 – 1146 (7–8 years)		1105; Kraków Son of Bolesław III Wrymouth and Zbyslava of Kiev	(1) Agnes of Babenberg; 5 children	30 May 1159; Altenburg; Aged 54	Duke of Silesia; Succession Deposed and exiled	Piast
High Duke; Bolesław IV the Curly; Polish: Bolesław IV Kędzierzawy; 1146 – 1173 (26–27 years)		c. 1125 Son of Bolesław III Wrymouth and Salomea of Berg	(1) Viacheslava of Novgorod; 3 children	5 January 1173; Aged about 51	Duke of Masovia 1138; Succeeded, exiled half-brother	Piast
High Duke; Mieszko III of Poland; Polish: Mieszko III Stary; 1173 – 1177 (3–4 years)		c. 1127 Son of Bolesław III Wrymouth and Salomea of Berg	(1) Elizabeth of Hungary, Duchess of Greater Poland (2) Eudoxia of Kiev	13 March 1202; Kalisz; Aged about 75	Duke of Greater Poland 1138; Succession Deposed by his brother in 1177	Piast
High Duke; Casimir II the Just; Polish: Kazimierz II Sprawiedliwy; 1177 – 1191 (13–14 years)		c. 1138 Son of Bolesław III Wrymouth and Salomea of Berg	(1) Helen of Znojmo; 7 children	5 May 1194; Kraków; Aged about 56	Usurped power from brother	Piast
Mieszko III; 1191 – 1191		–	–	–	Usurped	Piast
Casimir II the Just; 1191 – 1194		–	–	–	Restoration	Piast
High Duke; Leszek I the White; Polish: Leszek Biały; 1194 – 1198 (3–4 years)		c. 1184/1185 Son of Casimir II the Just and Helen of Znojmo	(1) Grzymisława of Luck; 2 children	24 November 1227; Marcinkowo Górne; Aged about 43	Succession	Piast
Mieszko III; 1198 – 1199		–	–	–	Agreement with Leszek and his regents	Piast
Leszek I the White; 1199 – 1199		–	–	–	Restored	Piast
Mieszko III; 1199 – 1202		–	–	–	Restored	Piast
High Duke; Władysław III Spindleshanks; Polish: Władysław III Laskonogi; 1202 – 1206 (3–4 years)		c. 1167 Son of Mieszko III of Poland and Eudoxia of Kiev	(1) Lucia of Rügen; 2 children	3 November 1231; Aged about 64	Invited to rule by voivode Mikołaj Gryfita	Piast
Leszek I the White; 1206 – 1210		–	–	–	Restored	Piast
High Duke; Mieszko IV Tanglefoot; Polish: Mieszko IV Plątonogi; 1210 – 1211 (0–1 years)		c. 1130 Son of Władysław II the Exile and Agnes of Babenberg	(1) Ludmila; 5 children	16 May 1211; Aged about 81	Usurped	Piast
Leszek I the White; 1211 – 1227 (15–16 years)		–	–	–	Restored Murdered in 1227	Piast
Władysław III Spindleshanks; 1228 – 1231		–	–	–	Succession agreement with predecessor	Piast
High Duke; Henry the Bearded; Polish: Henryk I Brodaty; 1231 – 1238 (6–7 years)		c. 1165/1188; Głogów Son of Bolesław I the Tall and Christina (?)	(1) Hedwig of Silesia; 7 children	19 March 1238; Krosno Odrzańskie; Aged about 73	Succession agreement with predecessor	Piast
High Duke; Henry II the Pious; Polish: Henryk II Pobożny; 1238 – 1241 (2–3 years)		c. 1196; Głogów Son of Henry the Bearded and Hedwig of Silesia	(1) Anne of Bohemia; 10 children	9 April 1241; Legnickie Pole; Aged about 45	Succession Killed at the Battle of Legnica	Piast
High Duke; Bolesław II the Horned; Polish: Bolesław II Rogatka; 1241 – 1241		c. 1220/1225; Głogów Son of Henry II the Pious and Anne of Bohemia	(1) Hedwig of Anhalt; 7 children (2) Euphemia of Pomerania (3) Sophia of Dyhrn	26 December 1278; Legnica	Succession Deposed	Piast
High Duke; Konrad I of Masovia; 1241 – 1243 (1–2 years)		c. 1187/1188 Son of Casimir II the Just and Helen of Znojmo	(1) Agafia of Rus; 10 children	31 August 1247; Aged about 60	Usurped	Piast
High Duke; Bolesław V the Chaste; Polish: Bolesław V Wstydliwy; 1243 – 1279 (35–36 years)		21 June 1226; Stary Korczyn Son of Leszek I the White and Grzymisława of Luck	(1) Kinga of Poland	7 December 1279; Kraków; Aged 52	Restored as the rightful Duke	Piast
High Duke; Leszek II the Black; Polish: Leszek Czarny; 1279 – 1288 (8–9 years)		c. 1241; Brześć Kujawski Son of Casimir I of Kuyavia and Constance of Wrocław	(1) Gryfina of Halych	30 September 1288; Kraków; Aged about 47	Adopted by predecessor Succession	Piast
High Duke; Henry Probus; English: Henry the Righteous; Polish: Henryk IV Prawy; 1288 – 1290 (8–9 years)		c. 1257/1258 Son of Henry III the White and Judith of Masovia	(1) Constance, Duchess of Wodzisław (2) Matilda of Brandenburg	23 June 1290; Wrocław; Aged about 32	Usurped	Piast

=== Attempt at restoration (1295–1296) ===
In the 13th century, the idea of the reunification of Poland under a single ruler started to gain popularity. It was often connected with the coronation and establishment of the hereditary kingdom. First attempts were made by Henry II the Pious and Henry Probus, but both of them died before they managed to achieve their goals. The first duke, who became king in this period, was Przemysł II. He ruled briefly as high duke but didn't manage to unite all Polish lands. He crowned himself when ruling in his hereditary province, Greater Poland, and in the province of Eastern Pomerania. His assassination in 1296 delayed the unification of Poland by 20 years.

Name	Portrait	Arms	Birth	Marriage(s)	Death	Claim	House
King; Przemysł II; English: Premislaus II; 1290 – 1291 (as High Duke) 1295 – 1296 (as King) (1 year)			14 October 1257; Poznań Son of Przemysł I of Greater Poland and Elisabeth of Wrocław	(1) Ludgarda of Mecklenburg (2) Richeza of Sweden; 1 child (3) Margaret of Brandenburg	8 February 1296; Rogoźno; Aged 38	Named an heir in predecessor's testament Crowned king in 1295 Granted Poland its coat of arms Assassinated	Piast

== Přemyslid House ==
The House of Přemyslid were kings of Bohemia and had many family connections with the Piast dynasty. In 1291, Wenceslaus II of Bohemia exploited the weakness of an internally divided Poland and conquered Kraków, basing his claim on loose family ties with one of the previous high dukes. He later legitimised his rule by marrying the daughter of Przemysł II, which also gave him claims to Polish kingship.

Name	Portrait	Arms	Birth	Marriage(s)	Death	Claim	House
King; Wenceslaus II of Bohemia; Polish: Wacław II Czeski; 1291 – 1300 (as High Duke) 1300 – 1305 (as King) (4–5 years)			27 September 1271; Prague Son of Ottokar II of Bohemia and Kunigunda of Halych	(1) Judith of Habsburg; 10 children (2) Elisabeth Richeza of Poland; 1 child	21 June 1305; Prague; Aged 33	Usurped Crowned himself King of Poland in 1300	Přemyslid
(Uncrowned); Wenceslaus III of Bohemia; Polish: Wacław III Czeski; 1305 – 1306 (1 year)			6 October 1289; Prague Son of Wenceslaus II of Bohemia and Judith of Habsburg	(1) Viola of Teschen	4 August 1306; Olomouc; Aged 16	Succession Uncrowned and assassinated	Přemyslid

== House of Piast (restored) ==
Near the end of the reign of Wenceslaus II of Bohemia, his rule over Poland was undermined by the remaining polish dukes – especially by Władysław I the Elbow-high, who had been exiled by Wenceslaus and had a strong claim to inheritance of Przemysł II, and by Henry III, Duke of Głogów, who also was an heir of Przemysł. The assassination of Wenceslaus III of Bohemia, which led to the extinction of the Přemyslid dynasty and a succession crisis in Bohemia, left Poland to Wenceslaus's opponents. His successors in Bohemia called themselves kings of Poland until 1335. Eventually, Władysław I the Elbow-high managed to unite the two main provinces of Poland – Greater Poland and Lesser Poland – and crowned himself king in 1320, ending the period of feudal fragmentation.

Name	Portrait	Arms	Birth	Marriage(s)	Death	Claim	House
King; Władysław I the Elbow-high; Polish: Władysław I Łokietek; 1306 – 1320 (as High Duke) 20 January 1320 – 2 March 1333 (as King) (26 years, 183 days)	16th century portrait by Antoni Boys		c. 1260 Son of Casimir I of Kuyavia and Euphrosyne of Opole	(1) Jadwiga of Kalisz; 6 children	2 March 1333; Kraków; Aged about 73	Rebellion against Přemyslid rule Reunited the Kingdom of Poland after fragmentation Crowned King in 1320	Piast
King; Casimir III the Great; Polish: Kazimierz III Wielki; 25 April 1333 – 5 November 1370 (37 years, 195 days)	Sarcophagus effigy at Wawel Cathedral, Kraków		30 April 1310; Kowal Son of Władysław I Łokietek and Jadwiga of Kalisz	(1) Aldona of Lithuania; 2 children (2) Adelaide of Hesse (3) Christina Rokiczana (4) Hedwig of Sagan; 3 children	5 November 1370; Kraków; Aged 60	Succession Strengthened Poland's position in Europe Died without a male heir Last monarch from the Piast Dynasty	Piast

== House of Anjou ==
Casimir III the Great died without male heir. According to previous agreements, his successor became his nephew, king of Hungary Louis I of Hungary, beginning the Polish-Hungarian personal union. After Louis' death, his kingdoms were separated – his younger daughter, Jadwiga of Poland, became the female king of Poland after a brief interregnum.

Name	Portrait	Arms	Birth	Marriage(s)	Death	Claim	House
King; Louis I of Hungary; Polish: Ludwik Węgierski; 17 November 1370 – 10 September 1382 (11 years, 298 days)			5 March 1326; Visegrád Son of Charles I of Hungary and Elizabeth of Poland, Queen of Hungary	(1) Margaret of Bohemia, Queen of Hungary (2) Elizabeth of Bosnia; 4 children	10 September 1382; Nagyszombat (Trnava); Aged 56	Succeeded his uncle, Casimir III the Great, to the Polish throne	Anjou
Queen; Jadwiga of Poland; Polish: Jadwiga; 16 October 1384 – 17 July 1399 (14 years, 275 days)	Portrait on seal		3 October 1373–18 February 1374; Buda Daughter of Louis I of Hungary and Elizabeth of Bosnia	(1) William, Duke of Austria (disputed) (2) Władysław II Jagiełło (Jogaila); 1 child	17 July 1399; Kraków; Aged 25	Succeeded her father in Poland. The last hereditary ruler of Poland. Her husband was crowned jure uxoris on 4 March 1386.	Anjou

== House of Jagiellon ==
Female king Jadwiga of Poland started her reign young and unmarried, which gave Poland a huge opportunity. She eventually married the pagan Grand Duke of Lithuania Jogaila, who adopted the name Władysław II Jagiełło after baptism. This event led to the creation of the Polish–Lithuanian personal union. After Jadwiga's death, Władysław remained king of Poland, but he and his successors were no longer considered natural lords of Poland and often had to give privileges to nobility in exchange for support of the succession of their children.

Name	Portrait	Arms	Birth	Marriage(s)	Death	Claim	House
King; Władysław II Jagiełło; Lithuanian: Jogaila; 2 February 1386 – 1 June 1434 (48 years, 120 days)			c. 1352/1362; Vilnius Son of Algirdas and Uliana of Tver	(1) Jadwiga of Poland; 1 child (2) Anna of Cilli; 1 child (3) Elizabeth Granowska (4) Sophia of Halshany; 3 children	1 June 1434; Gródek; Aged 72–82	Born a pagan Previously Grand Duke of Lithuania Crowned co-ruler as husband of Jadwiga Anjou Longest-reigning Polish monarch	Jagiellon
King; Władysław III of Poland; English: Ladislaus III of Varna; Polish: Władysław III Warneńczyk; 25 July 1434 – 10 November 1444 (10 years, 109 days)			31 October 1424; Kraków Son of Władysław II Jagiełło and Sophia of Halshany	Unmarried and childless	10 November 1444; Varna; Aged 20 (presumed)	Elected as his father's successor in Poland Presumed to be killed at the Battle of Varna Interregnum until 1447	Jagiellon
King; Casimir IV Jagiellon; Polish: Kazimierz IV Jagiellończyk; 25 June 1447 – 7 June 1492 (44 years, 349 days)			30 November 1427; Kraków Son of Władysław II Jagiełło and Sophia of Halshany	Elizabeth of Austria; 13 children	7 June 1492; Grodno; Aged 64	Election Previously Grand Duke of Lithuania Divided the Polish–Lithuanian realm between John I Albert and Alexander Jagiellon	Jagiellon
King; John I Albert; Polish: Jan I Olbracht; 27 August 1492 – 17 June 1501 (8 years, 295 days)			27 December 1459; Kraków Son of Casimir IV Jagiellon and Elizabeth of Austria	Unmarried and childless	17 June 1501; Toruń; Aged 41	Elected as his father's successor in Poland Laid foundation for the Sejm and Senate (Polish Parliament)	Jagiellon
King; Alexander Jagiellon; Polish: Aleksander Jagiellończyk; 3 October 1501 – 19 August 1506 (4 years, 321 days)			5 August 1461; Kraków Son of Casimir IV Jagiellon and Elizabeth of Austria	Helena of Moscow	19 August 1506; Vilnius; Aged 45	Succeeded his brother in Poland as elective monarch Previously Grand Duke of Lithuania Buried in Lithuania	Jagiellon
King; Sigismund I the Old; Polish: Zygmunt I Stary; 8 December 1506 – 1 April 1548 (41 years, 116 days)			1 January 1467; Kozienice Son of Casimir IV Jagiellon and Elizabeth of Austria	(1) Barbara Zápolya; 2 children (2) Bona Sforza; 6 children	1 April 1548; Kraków; Aged 81	Succeeded his brother in Lithuania, elected as his successor in Poland.	Jagiellon
King; Sigismund II Augustus; Polish: Zygmunt II August; 18 December 1529 – 7 July 1572 (42 years, 203 days)			1 August 1520; Kraków Son of Sigismund I the Old and Bona Sforza	(1) Elizabeth of Austria (2) Barbara Radziwiłł (3) Catherine of Austria	7 July 1572; Knyszyn; Aged 51	Election vivente rege Formation of the Polish–Lithuanian Commonwealth with an elective monarchy Last male member of the Jagiellonian Dynasty, died heirless.	Jagiellon

== Polish–Lithuanian Commonwealth, 1569–1795 ==
In 1569, King Sigismund II Augustus, knowing that he had no heir, united Poland and Lithuania into a single entity — the Polish–Lithuanian Commonwealth — to ensure that after his death both nations would remain under the same monarch. He also declared that after his death, the nobility would elect his successor, beginning the elective monarchy not constricted to members of one dynasty, like during the Jagiellons. He also ensured that all nobles would decide the next king, not only the richest and most powerful ones. The first post-Jagiellonic elective king, Henry III of France, signed the Henrician Articles, which guaranteed free elections and the rule of the nobility over the state. He, and every ruler after him, had to sign a "pacta conventa" — a document of policies that the king promised to implement. After the death of every king, the primate of Poland became an interrex; a temporary head of state, until a new king was elected.

Name	Portrait	Arms	Birth	Marriage(s)	Death	Claim	House
King; Henry III of France; Polish: Henryk Walezy; 16 May 1573 – 12 May 1575 (1 year, 362 days)			19 September 1551; Fontainebleau Son of Henry II of France and Catherine de' Medici	(1) Louise of Lorraine	2 August 1589; Saint-Cloud; Aged 37	Elected Left Poland in June 1574 to succeed his brother in France Interregnum until 1575	Valois
Queen; Anna Jagiellon; Polish: Anna Jagiellonka; 15 December 1575 – 19 August 1587 (de facto) (11 years, 248 days) – 9 September 1596 (de jure) (20 years, 270 days)			18 October 1523; Kraków Daughter of Sigismund I the Old and Bona Sforza	(1) Stephen Báthory	9 September 1596; Warsaw; Aged 72	Elected co-monarch with Stephen Báthory Ruled only formally Sole ruler until Báthory's arrival and coronation in May 1576 Ruled after husband's death until her nephew was elected.	Jagiellon
King; Stephen Báthory; Polish: Stefan Batory; 1 May 1576 – 12 December 1586 (10 years, 226 days)			27 September 1533; Szilágysomlyó Son of Stephen VIII Báthory and Catherine Telegdi	(1) Anna Jagiellon	12 December 1586; Grodno; Aged 53	Elected as co-monarch with Anna Jagiellon Prince of Transylvania.	Báthory
King; Sigismund III Vasa; Polish: Zygmunt III Waza; 19 August 1587 – 30 April 1632 (44 years, 256 days)			20 June 1566; Gripsholm Son of John III of Sweden and Catherine Jagiellon	(1) Anne of Austria; 5 children (2) Constance of Austria; 7 children	30 April 1632; Warsaw; Aged 65	Elected, nephew of Anna Jagiellon Transferred capital from Kraków to Warsaw Hereditary King of Sweden until deposition in 1599.	Vasa
King; Władysław IV Vasa also Ladislaus IV; Polish: Władysław IV Waza; 8 November 1632 – 20 May 1648 (15 years, 195 days)			9 June 1595; Łobzów Son of Sigismund III Vasa and Anne of Austria	(1) Cecilia Renata of Austria; 3 children (2) Marie Louise Gonzaga	20 May 1648; Merkinė; Aged 52	Elected after the death of his father Also titular King of Sweden and elected Tsar of Russia (1610–1613) when the Polish army captured Moscow.	Vasa
King; John II Casimir; Polish: Jan II Kazimierz; 20 November 1648 – 16 September 1668 (19 years, 302 days)			22 March 1609; Kraków Son of Sigismund III Vasa and Constance of Austria	(1) Marie Louise Gonzaga; 2 children (2) Claudine Françoise Mignot (allegedly); 1 child?	16 December 1672; Nevers; Aged 63	Elected after the death of his half-brother Previously a cardinal Titular King of Sweden Abdicated.	Vasa
King; Michał Korybut Wiśniowiecki; Polish: Michał Korybut Wiśniowiecki; 19 June 1669 – 10 November 1673 (4 years, 145 days)			31 May 1640; Biały Kamień Son of Jeremi Wiśniowiecki and Gryzelda Konstancja Wiśniowiecka	Eleonora Maria of Austria; 1 child	10 November 1673; Lwów; Aged 33	Elected Born into nobility of mixed heritage, the son of a military commander and governor	Wiśniowiecki
King; John III Sobieski; Polish: Jan III Sobieski; 19 May 1674 – 17 June 1696 (22 years, 30 days)			17 August 1629; Olesko Son of Jakub Sobieski and Teofila Zofia Sobieska	(1) Marie Casimire d'Arquien; 13 children	17 June 1696; Wilanów; Aged 66	Elected Born into nobility A successful military commander	Sobieski
King; Augustus II the Strong; Polish: August II Mocny; 15 September 1697 – 1706 (1st reign, 9 years)			12 May 1670; Dresden Son of John George III and Princess Anna Sophie of Denmark	(1) Christiane Eberhardine of Brandenburg-Bayreuth; 1 child	1 February 1733; Warsaw; Aged 62	Elected Previously Elector and ruler of Saxony Dethroned by Stanislaus I in 1706 during the Great Northern War	Wettin
King; Stanisław Leszczyński; Polish: Stanisław I Leszczyński; 12 July 1704 – 8 July 1709 (1st reign, 4 years, 362 days)			20 October 1677; Lwów Son of Rafał Leszczyński and Anna Leszczyńska	(1) Catherine Opalińska; 2 children	23 February 1766; Lunéville; Aged 88	Usurped Nominated as ruler in 1704, crowned in 1705 and deposed predecessor in 1706 Exiled in 1709	Leszczyński
King; Augustus II the Strong; Polish: August II Mocny; 8 July 1709 – 1 February 1733 (2nd reign, 23 years, 209 days)			12 May 1670; Dresden Son of John George III and Princess Anna Sophie of Denmark	(1) Christiane Eberhardine of Brandenburg-Bayreuth; 1 child	1 February 1733; Warsaw; Aged 62	Restored	Wettin
King; Stanisław Leszczyński; Polish: Stanisław I Leszczyński; 12 September 1733 – 26 January 1736 (2nd reign, 2 years, 137 days)			20 October 1677; Lwów Son of Rafał Leszczyński and Anna Jabłonowska	(1) Catherine Opalińska; 2 children, including Marie, Queen of France	23 February 1766; Lunéville; Aged 88	Elected His election sparked the War of the Polish Succession Deposed by Augustus III of Poland in 1736	Leszczyński
King; Augustus III of Poland; Polish: August III Sas; 5 October 1733 – 5 October 1763 (30 years)			17 October 1696; Dresden Son of Augustus II the Strong and Christiane Eberhardine of Brandenburg-Bayreuth	(1) Maria Josepha of Austria; 16 children	5 October 1763; Dresden; Aged 66	Usurped Proclaimed King of Poland in 1733, crowned in 1734 Dethroned elected predecessor in 1736	Wettin
King; Stanisław August Poniatowski; Polish: Stanisław II August; 7 September 1764 – 25 November 1795 (31 years, 80 days)			17 January 1732; Wołczyn Son of Stanisław Poniatowski and Konstancja Czartoryska	Officially unmarried; (1) Elżbieta Szydłowska (allegedly) presumably several unacknowledged children	1 February 1798; Saint Petersburg; Aged 66	Elected Born into nobility Last King of Poland and Grand Duke of Lithuania, his reign ended in the Partitions of Poland	Poniatowski

== Duchy of Warsaw, 1807–1815 ==
After a long period of instability and anarchy, the Polish–Lithuanian Commonwealth was divided among its neighbours—Russia, Prussia and Austria. During the Napoleonic Wars, Napoleon created the Duchy of Warsaw from the lands of the Prussian partition. Some parts of the Austrian partition were later added to the Duchy. The Duchy had its own duke and government, but was fully dependent on France. After the fall of Napoleon, the duchy was divided between Russia and Prussia.

Name	Portrait	Arms	Birth	Marriage(s)	Death	Claim	House
Grand Duke; Frederick Augustus I of Saxony; Polish: Fryderyk August I 9 June 1807 – 22 May 1815 (7 years, 348 days)			23 December 1750; Dresden Son of Frederick Christian, Elector of Saxony and Duchess Maria Antonia of Bavaria	(1) Amalie of Zweibrücken-Birkenfeld; 1 child	5 May 1827; Dresden; Aged 76	Treaties of Tilsit Designated as a king of Poland by General Confederation of the Kingdom of Poland, 1812.	Wettin

== Poland from 1815 to 1918 ==
After the fall of the Duchy of Warsaw, the Polish lands were reorganised. Prussia annexed Greater Poland and created the Grand Duchy of Posen, Kraków became a free city and the rest of the former Duchy of Warsaw became part of the Russian Empire, as Congress Kingdom of Poland. In 1846, Kraków was annexed by Austria, as Grand Duchy of Kraków, and in 1848, the Grand Duchy of Posen was dissolved. In 1867, after the failed January Uprising, the remaining autonomy of Congress Poland was abolished.

During World War I, in German occupied Congress Poland, the Regency Kingdom was formed and lasted from 1917 to 1918. After Poland regained independence in 1918, a republican system with the president as head of state was established.

See the list of rulers of partitioned Poland.

== Family tree of the rulers of Poland ==
This is a family tree of the Kings of Poland.

king of Poland
high duke
duke

Chościsko
Piast the Wheelwright
Siemowit
Lestek
Siemomysł died ca. 950–960
Mieszko I 930–960–992
Judith of Hungary; 969–988	Bolesław I Chrobry; 967–992–1025	Emnilda of Lusatia; 975–1017
Bezprym; 986–1031–1032	Mieszko II Lambert; 990–1034 r. 1025–1031,1032–1034
Bolesław the Forgotten r. 1034–1039	Casimir I the Restorer; 1016–1038–1058
Bolesław II the Generous; 1041–1081 r. 1058–1079	Przecława	Władysław I Herman; 1044–1079–1102	Judith of Bohemia; 1058–1086
Mieszko Bolesławowic; 1069–1089	Zbigniew; 1073–1113 r. 1102–1107	Zbyslava of Kiev; 1090–1112	Bolesław III Wrymouth; 1086–1102–1138	Salomea of Berg; 1101–1144
Władysław II the Exile; 1105–1159 r. 1138–1146
Bolesław I the Tall; 1127–1201	Mieszko IV Tanglefoot; 1130–1210–1211	Mieszko III the Old; 1126–1202 r. 1173–1177, 1191, 1198–1199, 1202	Bolesław IV the Curly; 1125–1146–1173	Casimir II the Just; 1138–1194 r. 1177–1191, 1191–1194	Agnes of Poland; 1137–>1182	Mstislav II of Kiev ?–1172 r. 1167–1169, 1170
Odon of Poznań; 1149–1194	Henry I the Bearded; 1165–1238 r. 1225, 1232–1238	Casimir I of Opole r. 1211 – 1230	Władysław III Spindleshanks; 1161–1231 r. 1202–1206, 1227–1229	Leszek I the White; 1186–1227 r. 1194–1198, 1199–1202, 1206–1210, 1211–1225, 1225–1227	Konrad I of Masovia; 1187–1247 r. 1229–1232, 1241–1243	Anastasia (Maria) of Poland	Vsevolod IV of Kiev r. 1203, 1206, 1207, 1208–1212	Roman the Great of Halych; 1152–1205 r. 1189, 1198–1205
Władysław Odonic; 1190–1239	Henry II the Pious; 1196–1238–1241	Bolesław V the Chaste; 1226–1243–1279	Michael of Chernigov r. 1223–1235, 1242–1246	Daniel of Galicia; 1201–1264 r. 1213–1264
Bolesław the Pious 1224/27 – 1279	Przemysł I of Greater Poland; 1221–1257	Elisabeth of Wrocław; 1232–1265	Bolesław II Rogatka; 1225–1278 r. 1241	Henry III the White; 1230–1266	Constance of Wrocław; 1227–1257	Casimir I of Kuyavia; 1211–1267	Euphrosyne of Opole; 1228–1292	Rostislav of Macsó r. 1248–1262	Leo I of Galicia c. 1228 – c. 1301; 1264–1301
Przemysł II; 1257–1290–1296	Henryk IV Probus; 1258–1288–1290	Leszek II the Black; 1241–1279–1288	Ottokar II of Bohemia c. 1233 – 1253 – 1278	Kunigunda of Halych 1245 – 1261 – 1285
Rudolf I of Bohemia titular king 1281–1306–1307	Elisabeth Richeza of Poland; 1286–1335	Wenceslaus II of Bohemia; 1271–1296–1305	Judith of Habsburg; 1271–1297	Hedwig of Kalisz; 1266 – 1339	Władysław I the Elbow-high; 1261–1306–1333	Euphemia of Kuyavia; 1265–1308	Yuri I of Galicia; 1252–1308
John of Bohemia titular king 1296–1346 r. 1310–1335	Elisabeth of Bohemia; 1292–1330	Wenceslaus III of Bohemia; 1289–1305–1306	Anne of Bohemia; 1290–1313	Henry of Bohemia titular king 1265–1335 r. 1307–1310	Casimir III the Great; 1310–1333–1370	Elisabeth of Poland; 1305–1380	Charles I of Hungary; 1286–1342	Anastasia of Halych	Alexander prince of Tver; 1301–1339
John II of France; 1319–1364	Bonne of Luxembourg; 1315–1349	William, Count of Celje; 1361–1392	Anna of Poland; 1366–1425	Louis I of Hungary; 1342–1370–1382	Elisabeth of Poland; 1326–1361	Uliana of Tver; 1325–1391
Charles V of France; 1338–1380	Anna of Cilli; 1381–1416	Władysław II Jagiełło; 1362–1386–1434	Jadwiga of Poland; 1373–1384–1399	Elizabeth of Pomerania; 1347–1393
Louis I, Duke of Orléans; 1372–1407	Sigismund, Holy Roman Emperor; 1368–1437
John, Count of Angoulême; 1399–1467	Sophia of Halshany; 1405–1461	Elizabeth of Luxembourg; 1409–1442
Charles, Count of Angoulême; 1459–1496	Władysław III; 1424–1434–1444	Casimir IV; 1427–1447–1492	Elizabeth of Austria; 1436–1505
Francis I of France; 1494–1547	Vladislaus II of Hungary and Bohemia; 1456–1516	John I Albert; 1459–1492–1501	Alexander I 1461–1501–1506	Sigismund I the Old; 1467–1506–1548	Anna of Poland; 1476–1503
Henry II of France; 1519–1559	Ferdinand I, Holy Roman Emperor; 1503–1564	Anne of Bohemia and Hungary; 1503–1547	Sophie of Pomerania; 1498–1568
Henry III; 1551–1589 r. 1574–1575	Maximilian I 1527–1576 elected 1575	Charles II, Archduke of Austria; 1540–1590	Elisabeth of Austria; 1526–1545	Sigismund II Augustus; 1520–1529–1572	John III of Sweden; 1537–1592	Catherine Jagiellon; 1526–1583	Anna Jagiellon; 1523–1596 r. 1575–1586	Stephen Báthory; 1533–1575–1586	Adolf of Holstein-Gottorp; 1526–1586
Maximilian II; 1558–1618 elected 1587	Ferdinand II, Holy Roman Emperor; 1578–1637	Constance of Austria; 1558–1631	Sigismund III Vasa; 1566–1587–1632	John Adolf, Duke of Holstein-Gottorp; 1575–1616
Maria Anna of Austria; 1610–1665)	Ferdinand III, Holy Roman Emperor; 1608–1657	Cecilia Renata of Austria; 1611–1644	Władysław IV; 1595–1632–1648	John II Casimir; 1609–1672 r. 1648–1668	Frederick III, Duke of Holstein-Gottorp; 1597–1659
John III Sobieski; 1629–1674–1696	Ferdinand Maria, Elector of Bavaria; 1636–1679	Leopold I, Holy Roman Emperor; 1640–1705	Eleanor of Austria; 1653–1697	Michał Korybut Wiśniowiecki; 1640–1669–1673	Christian Albert, Duke of Holstein-Gottorp; 1641–1695
Theresa Kunegunda Sobieska; 1676–1730	Maximilian II Emanuel, Elector of Bavaria; 1662–1726	Maria Antonia of Austria; 1669–1692	Joseph I, Holy Roman Emperor; 1678–1711	Augustus II the Strong; 1670–1733 r. 1697–1704, 1709–1733	Stanisław Leszczyński; 1677–1766 r. 1704–1709, 1733–1734	François Louis, Prince of Conti; 1664–1709 elected 1697	Christian August of Holstein-Gottorp, Prince of Eutin; 1673–1726	Frederick IV, Duke of Holstein-Gottorp; 1671–1702
Charles VII, Holy Roman Emperor; 1697–1745	Maria Amalia of Austria; 1701–1756	Maria Josepha of Austria; 1699–1757	Augustus III; 1696–1734–1763	Marie Leszczyńska; 1703–1768	Louis XV of France; 1710–1774	Joanna Elisabeth of Holstein-Gottorp; 1712–1760	Charles Frederick, Duke of Holstein-Gottorp; 1700–1739
Maria Antonia of Bavaria; 1724–1780	Frederick Christian elector of Saxony	Francis Xavier of Saxony; 1730–1806	Princess Maria Josepha of Saxony; 1731–1767	Louis, Dauphin of France; 1729–1765	Stanisław August Poniatowski; 1732–1798 r. 1764–1795	Catherine the Great; 1729–1795–1796	Peter III of Russia; 1728–1762
Frederick August duke of Warsaw	Paul I of Russia; 1754–1796–1801
Maria Augusta of Saxony; 1782–1863	Alexander I 1777–1801–1825	Nicholas I 1796–1825–1855
Alexander II; 1818–1858–1881
Alexander III; 1845–1881–1894
Nicholas II; 1868–1918 r. 1894–1917

== Pretenders to the Polish throne ==
- Vratislaus II of Bohemia (1085–1092)
- Rudolf I of Bohemia (1306–1307)
- Henry of Bohemia (1307–1310)
- John of Bohemia (1310–1335)
- William, Duke of Austria (1384–1406)
- Archduke Charles Stephen of Austria (1916–1918)
- Kiril, Prince of Preslav (1916–1918)

=== Modern ===
- Alexander Prinz von Sachsen (2012–present), disputed
- Rüdiger von Sachsen (2012–2022), disputed
- Daniel von Sachsen (2022–present), disputed; son of Rüdiger

=== Not recognized royal elections ===
- Maxmilian II Habsburg (1575–1576), See: 1576 Free election
- Maxmilian III Habsburg (1587–1589), See: 1587 Free election
- François Louis de Bourbon (1697), See: 1697 Free election

== See also ==
- Monarchism in Poland
- Coronations in Poland
- Dukes of Greater Poland
- Dukes of Masovia
- Dukes of Pomerania
- Dukes of Sieradz-Łęczyca
- Dukes of Silesia
- Kings of Poland family tree
- List of rulers of Partitioned Poland
- List of Galician rulers
- List of heads of state of Poland
- List of Poles
- List of Polish consorts
- List of prime ministers of Poland
- Princely Houses of Poland
- List of Lithuanian monarchs

== Bibliography ==
- Borkowska U., Dynastia Jagiellonów w Polsce, Warszawa 2012, ISBN 978-83-01-16692-2.
- Duczmal M., Jagiellonowie. Leksykon biograficzny, Kraków 1996.
- Dybkowska A., Żaryn J., Żaryn M., Polskie dzieje. Od czasów najdawniejszych po współczesność, wyd. 2, Warszawa 1995. ISBN 83-01-11870-9.
- Gierowski J.A., Rzeczpospolita w dobie złotej wolności (1648–1763), Kraków 2001. ISBN 83-85719-56-3.
- Grodziski S., Polska w czasach przełomu (1764–1815), Kraków 2001. ISBN 83-85719-45-8.
- Grodziski S., Porównawcza historia ustrojów państwowych, Kraków 1998. ISBN 83-7052-840-6.
- Grzybowski S., Dzieje Polski i Litwy (1506–1648), Kraków 2000. ISBN 83-85719-48-2.
- Maciorowski, Mirosław; Maciejewska, Beata (2018). Władcy Polski. Historia na nowo opowiedziana (in Polish). Warszawa: Agora. ISBN 978-83-268-2720-4.
- Morby J.E., Dynastie świata. Przewodnik chronologiczny i genealogiczny, Kraków 1995, pp. 261–263. ISBN 83-7006-263-6.
- Wyrozumski J., Dzieje Polski piastowskiej (VIII w.-1370), Kraków 1999. ISBN 83-85719-38-5.
- Zientara B., Henryk Brodaty i jego czasy, wyd. 2, Warszawa 1997.
