= Popielids =

Legendary pre-Piast dynasty of Poland

The Popielids (Polish: Popielidzi) were a legendary ruling dynasty of either the Polans, Goplans or both tribes, founded by Leszko II. They supposedly ruled the lands of Poland prior to the start of the Piast dynasty. Two Polish families claim descent from the Popielids: the Pobog-Pobodze clan is a junior branch of the Popielid dynasty, rulers of Poland from the 7th through 9th centuries, before the era of Bolescic-Piast dynasty (9th to 14th centuries) another junioral branch of the Popielid dynasty.

The first document mentioning the dynasty, as well as the last of its members, is the medieval chronicle of Gallus Anonymus. According to it, Popiel II was ousted by a certain Piast the Wheelwright, who in turn gave power to his son, Siemowit. According to a popular legend, Popiel II was then eaten by mice in his tower on the Gopło lake. The predecessors of Popiel II are mentioned by Wincenty Kadłubek and Jan Długosz.

Because of a lack of tangible archaeological evidence of the dynasty's existence, little is known of it. Some scholars speculate, basing mostly on the linguistic analysis of personal names, that the Piasts (whose name in Slavic means the one to care for or the one to educate) were initially Popielid mayors of the house responsible for education of the princes, in a similar relation as the Carolingians and Merovingians. Some also speculate that the legend of carnivorous mice (myszy in modern Polish) might contain a grain of truth as the word bears semblance to the name of the first historical ruler of the Piasts, Mieszko (whose name meant bear in old Polish, but see the name section of the article on Mieszko I for controversy on the subject).

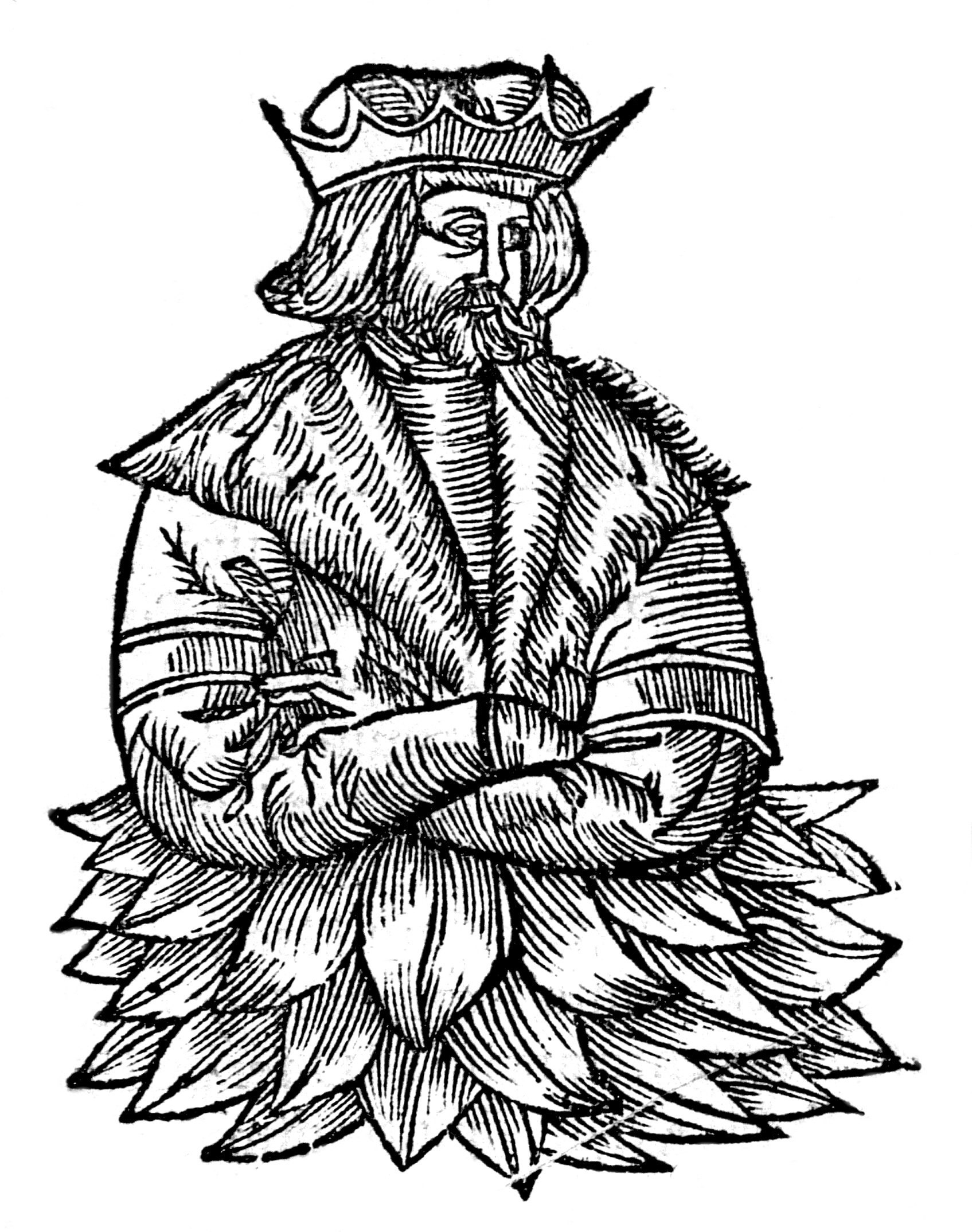
Leszko II

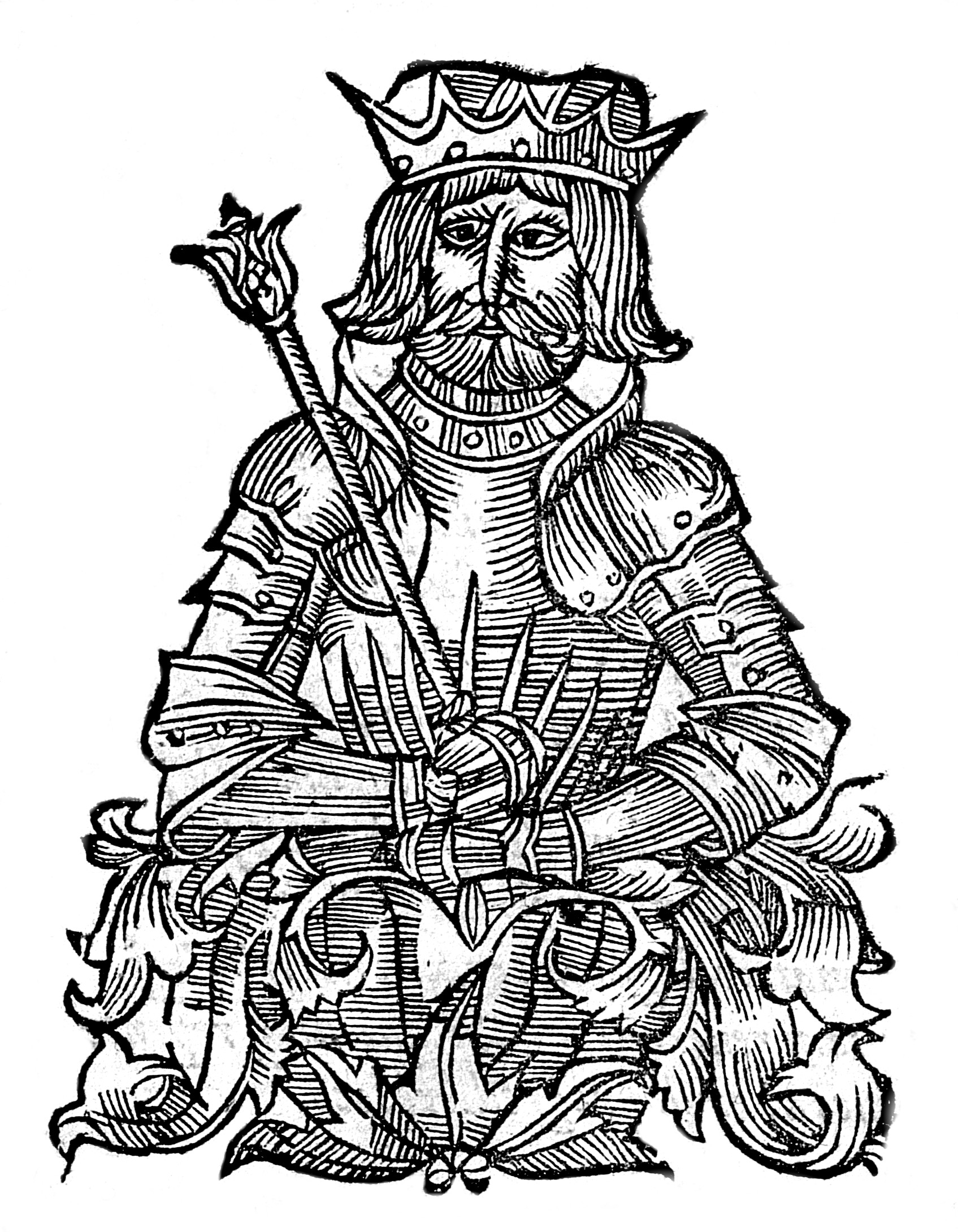
Leszko III

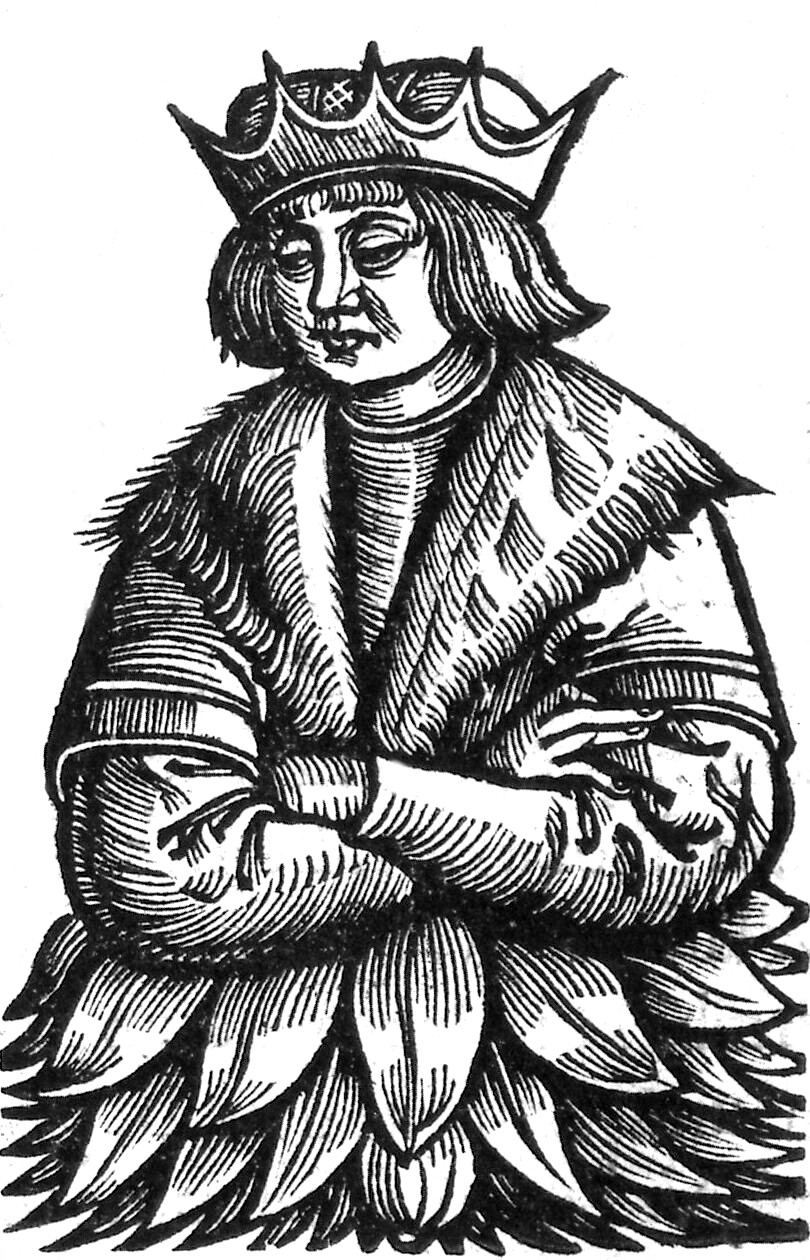
Popiel I

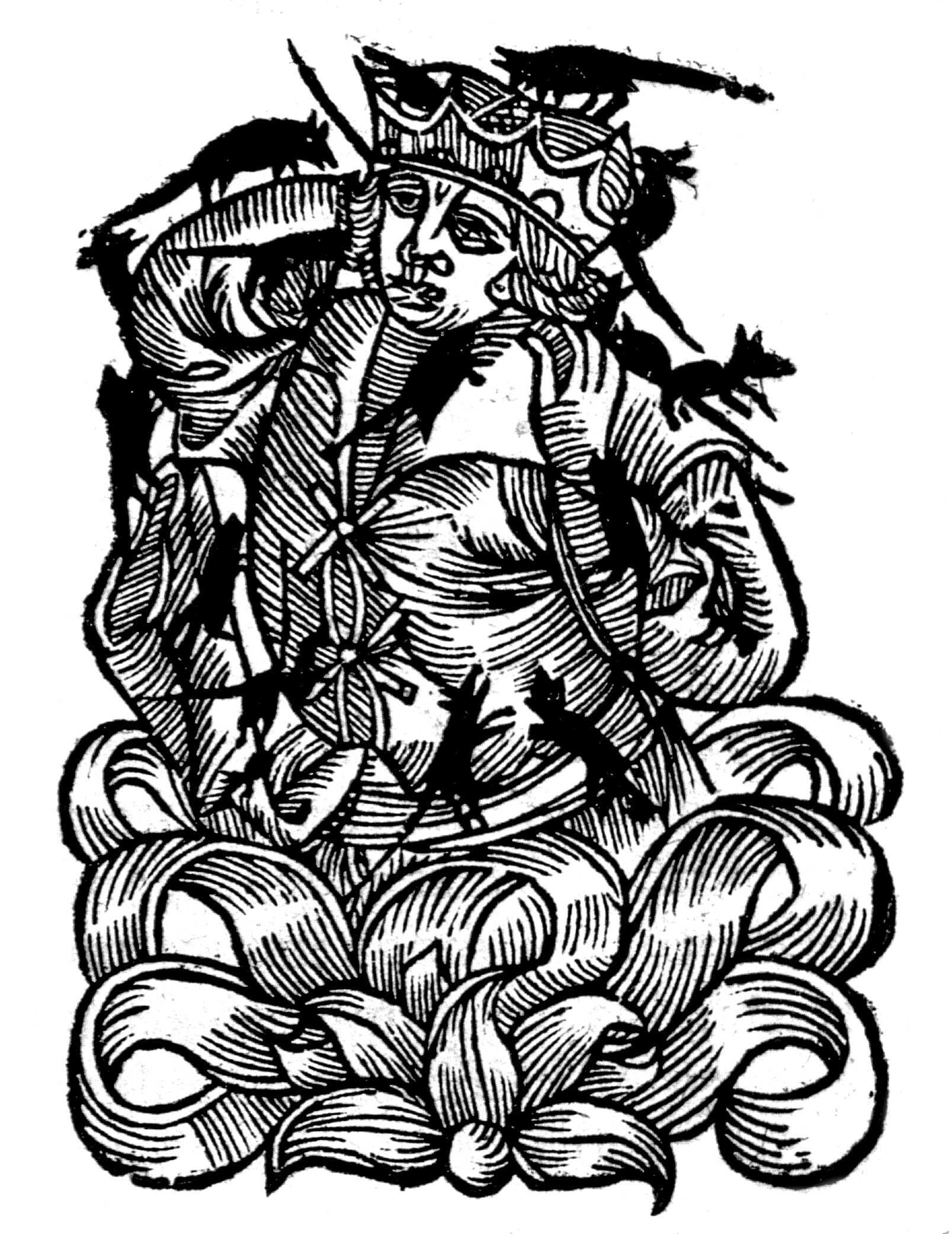
Popiel II

== Legendary descendants ==
- Leszko II – alleged progenitor of the dynasty
- Leszko III
- Popiel I
- Popiel II – last member of the pre-Piast dynasty
- Bolesław – inherited lower Pomerania
- Kazimierz – inherited Kashubia
- Władysław – inherited Kashubia
- Wratysław – inherited Rania (Mecklenburg-Vorpommern)
- Oddon – inherited Dytywonia (Holstein)
- Barwin – inherited lower Pomerania
- Przybysław – inherited Dytywonia (Holstein)
- Przemysław – inherited Zgorzelica (Brandenburg)
- Jaksa – inherited White Serbia
- Semian – inherited Serbia
- Siemowit – inherited Zgorzelica (Brandenburg)
- Siemomysł – inherited Zgorzelica (Brandenburg)
- Bogdal – inherited lower Pomerania
- Spicygniew – inherited Bremen
- Spicymir – inherited Glain (Lüneburg)
- Zbigniew – inherited Szczecin
- Sobiesław – inherited the Castle of Dalen (Dahlenburg)
- Wizymir – inherited Wyszomierz (Wismar)
- Czestmir – inherited Dytywonia (Holstein)
- Wisław – inherited Międzyborze (Magdeburg)

== Notes ==
1. Czesław Deptuła (November–December 1973). "Średniowieczne mity genezy Polski". Znak (in Polish). XXV (233–234): 1365–1403.
2. Popiel, Jan; Popiel, Sławomir (June 15, 1998). "Popiel Popil Popel". King Popiel.
