= Leszek I =

Leszek I can be referred to:

- Leszek I, legendary ruler of Poland
- Leszek I ("the White"), High Duke of Poland
