= Leszek II =

Leszek II can be referred to:

- Leszek II, legendary ruler of Poland
- Leszek II the Black, High Duke of Poland
