= Wizymir =

Wizymir or Wysymir (także: Wizimierz) – postać legendarna, syn (lub wnuk) Lecha, legendarnego protoplasty Polaków. is a legendary figure in Polish mythology, described as the son (or grandson) of Lech, the legendary progenitor of the Polish people.

According to a legend cited by the chronicler Marcin Bielski, Wizymir was ruthless toward the Danes, whose lands he sought to conquer in order to expand his territory all the way to the Baltic Sea. He succeeded in this campaign, seizing several Danish islands, including Rügen and Funen. He is then said to have crushed the warriors of the Danish king, Syward, leaving the Danes with only a tiny fraction of their conquered kingdom, while Syward was forced to regularly pay him tribute. To seal the treaty, Wizymir took the Danish king's children to his own court—his son Jameryk and his two daughters, whom he made his concubines. When Syward died, his son escaped captivity to claim the Danish throne. Upon taking power, he stopped paying tribute, which prompted Wizymir to launch another military expedition against Denmark.

== Sources of the Legend ==
The Account of Wincenty Kadłubek Earlier historical records, such as the chronicle of Wincenty Kadłubek, contain stories of otherwise unspecified conflicts between the Poles and the Danes. According to Kadłubek, these battles were initiated by the Poles simply out of a desire to test their military prowess. The chronicler notes that they supposedly captured the entirety of the "Danish Islands" (Danomarchicas insulas)). They first wiped out "powerful hosts" of Danes in naval battles, then advanced into "the very center of the islands," subjugating all the nobility and throwing the Danish king—Cnut—into prison.

The victorious Poles offered the Danes a choice in how they wished to be subjugated:

They could either pay a regular financial tribute,

Or they could adopt the customs and behavior of women to multiply their disgrace.

Because the defeated Danes could not agree on which option to choose, the Poles forced both punishments upon them.

Master Wincenty later writes that the grandson of the aforementioned King Cnut sought to "avenge his grandfather's grievance." However, because he could not defeat his enemies—as the Danes fought poorly against the Poles, and later against the Bastarnae—he decided to punish his own subjects instead. He ordered that whenever they went to sleep, they had to "place their heads where their feet belonged and serve their wives for as long as their wives had previously served their husbands," until they washed away the shame of their historical defeat.

The Greater Poland Chronicle Another major source for the legend is the Greater Poland Chronicle (Kronika Wielkopolska). In a passage describing the 20 sons that King Lestek III had with his concubines, the chronicle lists their names. A few pages later, it attributes a specific stronghold to each son, founded in their honor. According to this account, a prince named Wyszomir (originally Wyssimirus) founded a stronghold on the northern sea named Wyszomierz (originally Wyszszimiria) after himself, which corresponds to modern-day Wismar in Mecklenburg.

Historically, the 12th century saw heavy Danish military campaigns along the Slavic-inhabited coasts of the Baltic Sea, notably the invasions led by Valdemar the Great between 1160 and 1169. This was driven by the threat that Slavic pirates posed to the Danish state, having caused massive destruction to Denmark prior to Valdemar's ascension to the throne (roughly during the era of Cnut Lavard). It is highly probable that a local Slavic prince or eponim of the city of Wismar fought against the Danes during this era, giving rise to a local legend of victory that chroniclers later retrofitted into a much earlier, mythical timeline.

Literary Allusions The figure of Wizymir—humorously depicted as completely illiterate—is invoked by the Polish Enlightenment poet Ignacy Krasicki in his sharp satirical poem Do króla ("To the King"):

"No nation has ever gained power through books: The wise out-debated, but the foolish defeated. The one who once managed to capture Danish fleets— King Wizimierz—could neither write nor read."
