= Gopło =

Lake in Poland

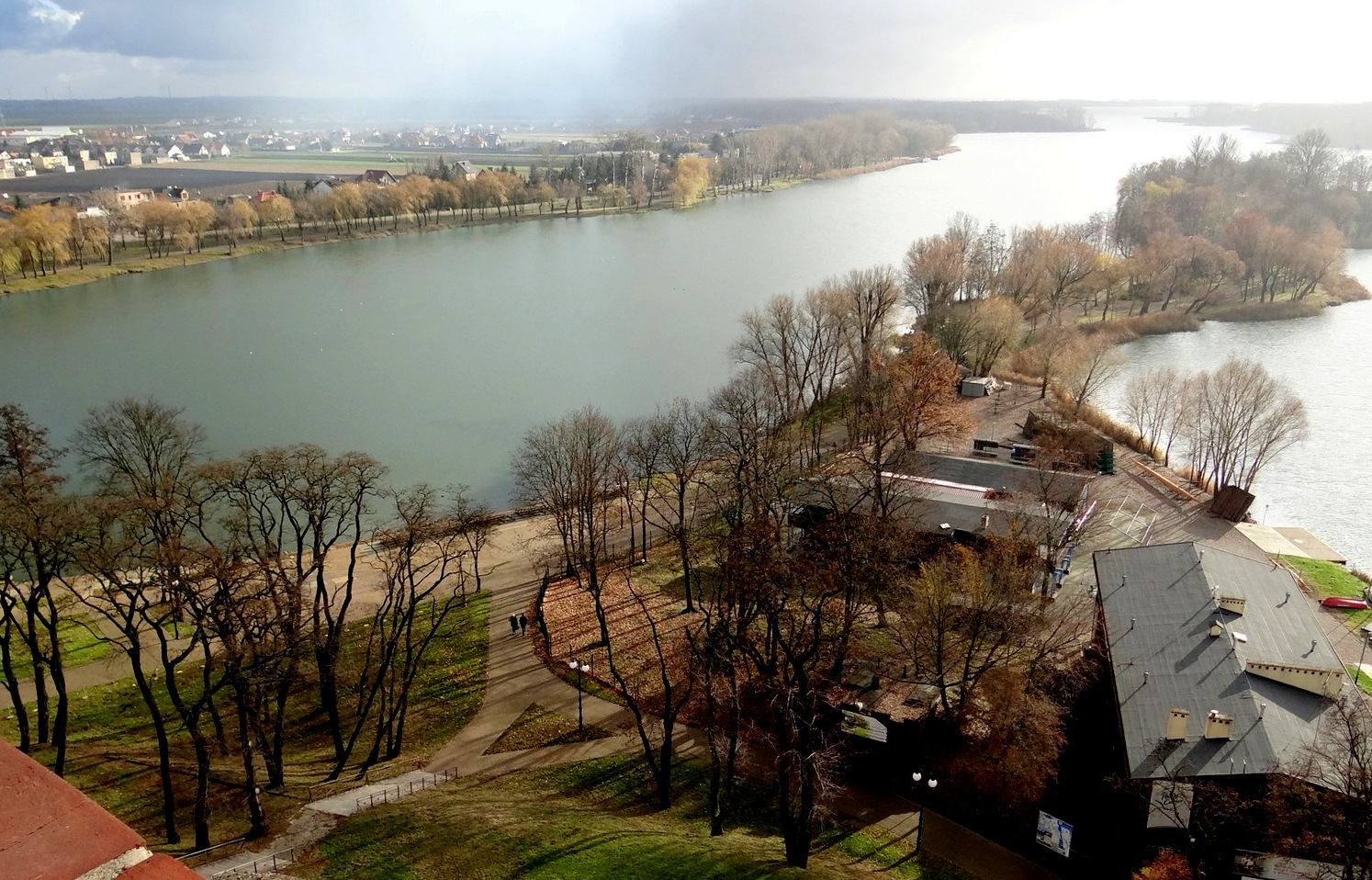
- View from the Mouse Tower of Kruszwica

- Location within Kuyavian-Pomeranian Voivodeship
- Location: Kuyavian-Pomeranian Voivodeship
- Coordinates: 52°35′08″N 18°21′15″E
- Primary inflows: Noteć
- Primary outflows: Noteć
- Basin countries: Poland
- Max. length: 25 km (16 mi)
- Max. width: 3.5 km (2.2 mi)
- Surface area: 21.8 km^{2} (8.4 sq mi)
- Average depth: 4.7 m (15 ft)
- Max. depth: 16.6 m (54 ft)
- Surface elevation: 77 m (253 ft)

Gopło ([ˈɡɔpwɔ]) is a ribbon lake in Kuyavian-Pomeranian Voivodeship, north-central Poland, near the city of Gniezno. It gives its name to the protected area called Gopło Landscape Park.

Gopło is the largest natural water reservoir in the Kuyavian-Pomeranian Voivodeship and the historical Kuyavia (Kujawy) region, being the eleventh largest lake in modern Poland.

In early Middle Ages, the shores of Lake Gopło were home to a Lechitic tribe known as the Goplans. At the northern end of the lake stands the "Mice Tower" of Kruszwica. Its name derives from a legend of the corrupt Prince Popiel, who fled to the tower from his rebelling population, and was devoured there by mice. Some historians and archaeologists consider the area the heart of the first state of the Polans, the "founding" tribe of Poland.
