= Popiel I =

Legendary Polish prince, king, and founder of Kraków

- Legendary ruler of Poland
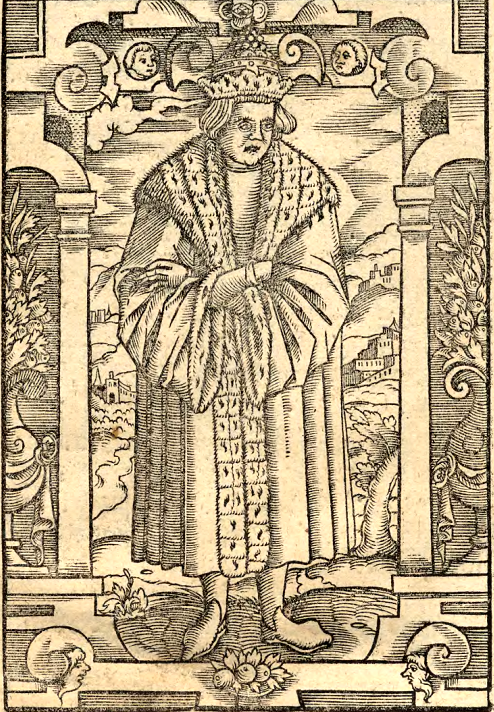
- Reign: 800 – 815
- Predecessor: Leszko III
- Successor: Popiel II
- Born: Unknown
- Died: 815

Popiel I was a legendary ruler of Poland, member of the Popielids dynasty. According to the legends reported by Wincenty Kadłubek in his Chronica seu originale regum et principum Poloniae, he was the son of Leszko III. Father of Popiel II. Reportedly ruled in harmony along with twenty stepbrothers, who chose his son for a new king during his lifetime (according to Chronicle of Greater Poland, chosen after his death).

According to Jan Długosz, Popiel led numerous successful wars, but he was described as inefficient and indolent. Długosz reported Popiel I at first ruling in Kraków, then deciding to move the capital to Gniezno. Ultimately, he moved the capital to Kruszwica.

Benedykt Chmielowski in Nowe Ateny reports that Popiel ruled for 15 years, and died in 815.

== Bibliography ==
- Jerzy Strzelczyk: Mity, podania i wierzenia dawnych Słowian. Poznań: Rebis, 2007 ISBN 978-83-7301-973-7.
- Jerzy Strzelczyk: Od prasłowian do Polaków. Kraków: Krajowa Agencja Wydawnicza, 1987 ISBN 83-03-02015-3.
