= Popiel =

Legendary Polish ruler

Popiel II
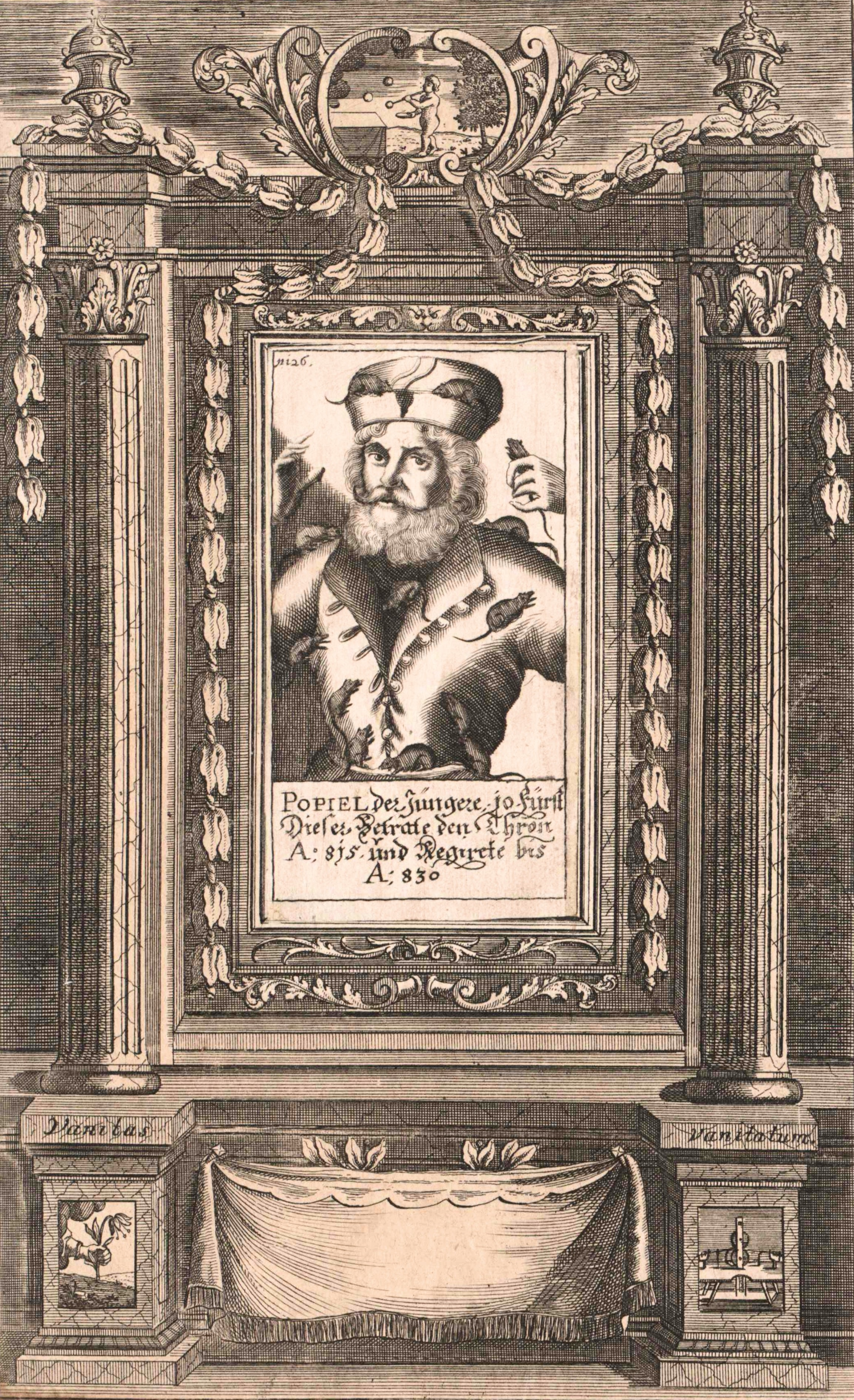
- Reign: 815 – ?
- Predecessor: Popiel I
- Successor: Chościsko
- Born: Unknown

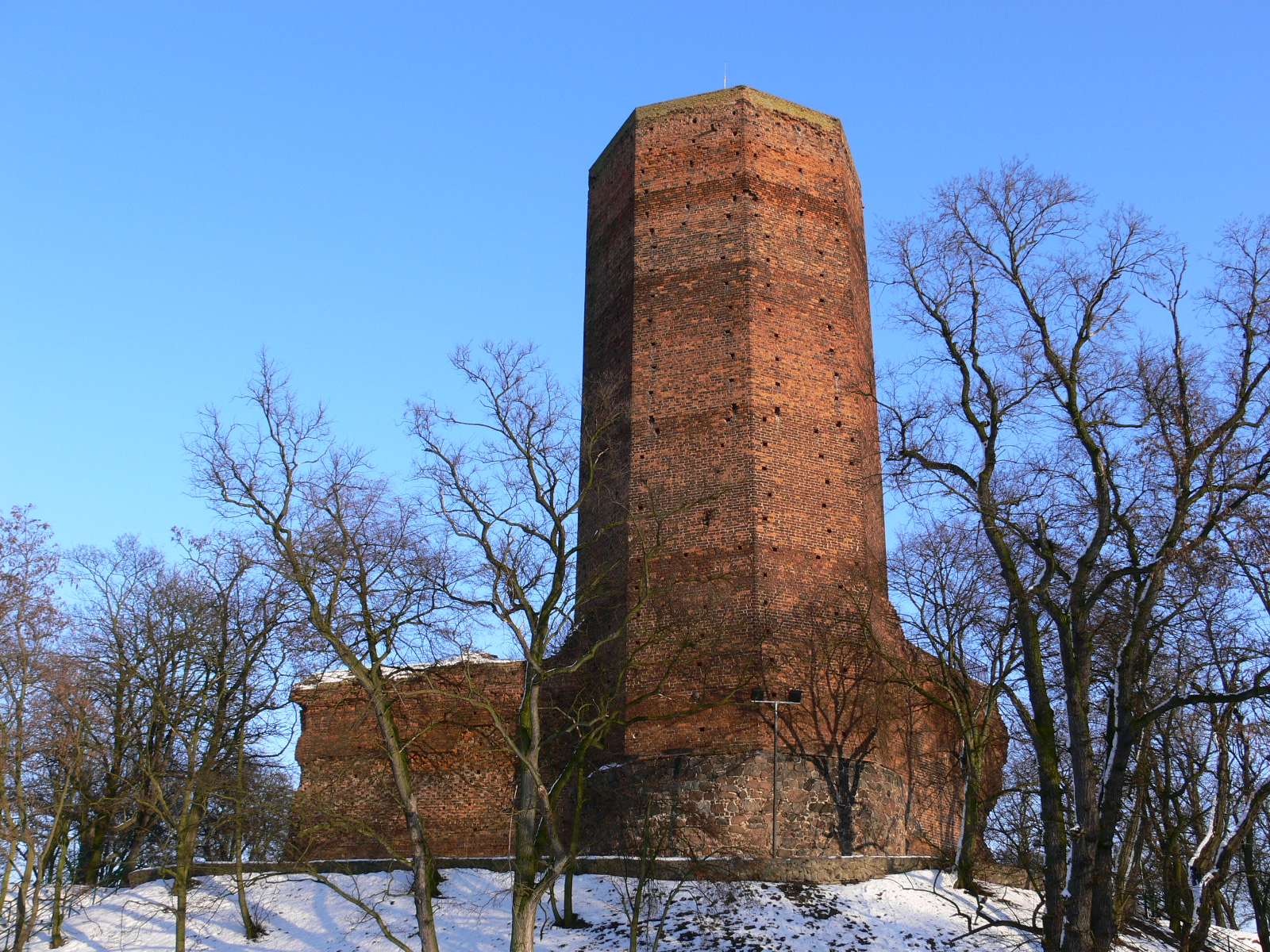
The Mouse Tower in Kruszwica, constructed in 1350, incorrectly associated with Popiel II.

Popiel ІІ was a legendary 9th century ruler of two proto-Polish tribes, the Goplans and West Polans. He was the last member of the Popielids, a legendary dynasty before the Piasts. According to the chroniclers Gallus Anonymus, Jan Długosz, and Marcin Kromer, as a consequence of his bad rule, he was deposed, besieged by his subjects, and eaten alive by mice in a tower in Kruszwica.

As the legend goes, Popiel II was a cruel and corrupt ruler who cared only for wine, women, and song. He was greatly influenced by his wife, a beautiful but power-hungry German princess. Because of Popiel's misrule and his failure to defend the land from marauding Vikings, his twelve uncles conspired to depose him; however, at his wife's instigation, he had them all poisoned during a feast (some believe that she committed the act herself). Instead of cremating their bodies, as was the custom, he had the corpses cast into Lake Gopło.

When the commoners saw what Popiel and his wife had done, they rebelled. The couple took refuge in a tower near the lake. As the story goes, a throng of mice and rats (which had been feeding on the unburnt bodies of Popiel's uncles) rushed into the tower, chewed through the walls, and devoured Popiel and his wife alive. Prince Popiel was succeeded by Piast the Wheelwright and Siemowit.

On the shore of Lake Gopło stands a medieval tower, nicknamed the Mouse Tower; however, it bears no relation to the site of the events described in the legend, as it was erected some 500 years thereafter.

== See also ==
- Mouse Tower. a similar legend about the supposed cruelty and demise of Hatto II, Archbishop of Mainz.
- An Ancient Tale, a novel by Polish writer Józef Kraszewski
