= Leszko III =

Slavic founding legend

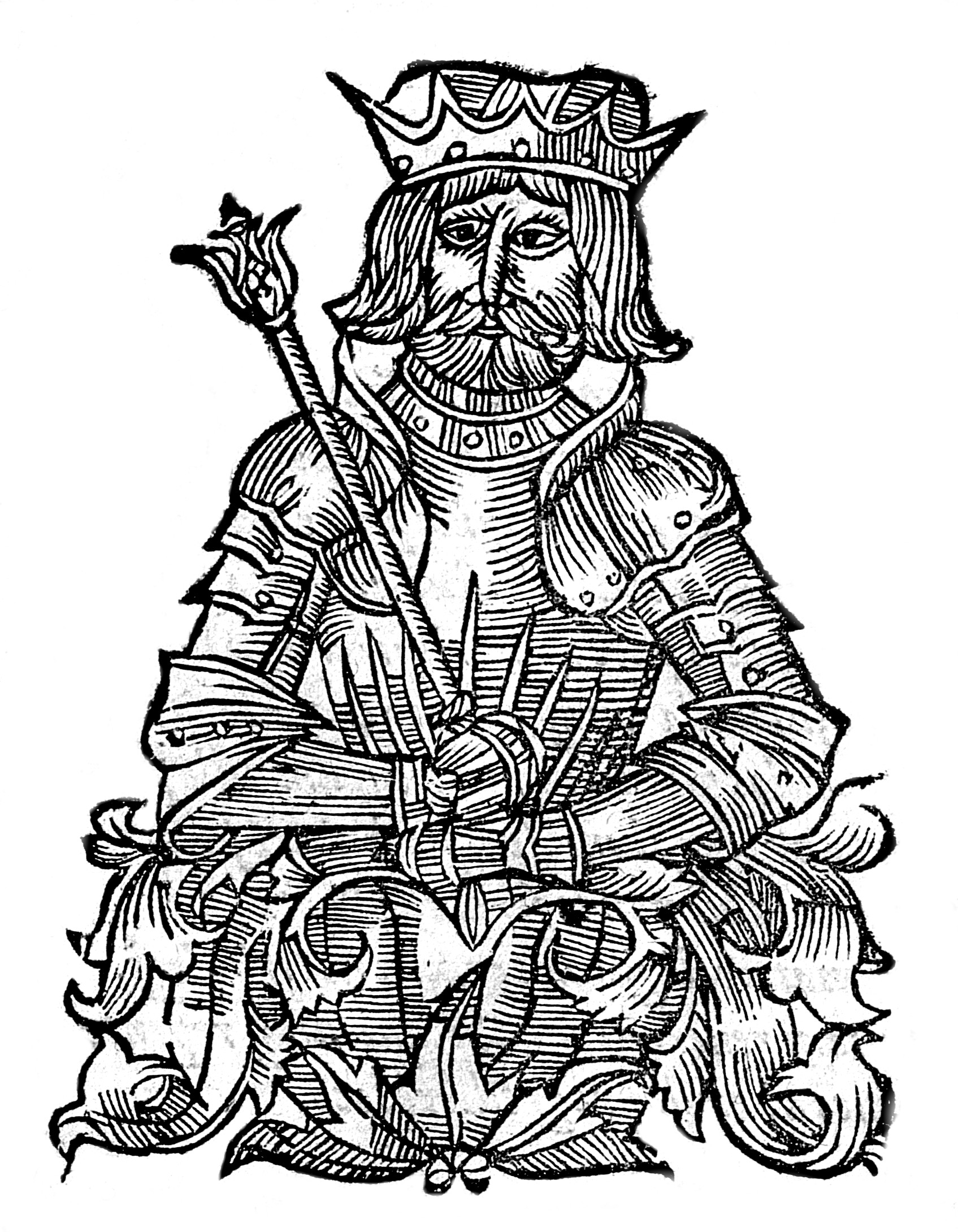
Lesco the Third, by Alexander Guagnini (1538–1614).

Leszko III (or Leszek, Lestek, Lesco) was a legendary ruler of Poland, firstly mentioned by Wincenty Kadłubek. Alleged son of Leszko II, father of Popiel I and grandfather of Popiel II. In the original chronicle, he fought with Julius Caesar, won, and took his sister, Julia, as wife.

== Hypothesis ==
Both Samon and Leszek III from Polish medieval chronicles had a similar number of male descendants – one had 21, the other 22. It is very likely that both chronicles describe the same ruler, because at this time and in this area, there is a very unlikely occurrence of two rulers of similar character traits (cleverness, cunning) and with a similar number of sons. The key to the mystery is the 22 sons of the ruler Samo, Zamo, mentioned in the Chronicle of Fredegar. This is a large number of descendants that this ruler had with many concubines. The statistical probability of this happening is relatively small. Researchers have discovered quite a long time ago the puzzling coincidence of the Chronicle of Fredegar. The chronicler describes these events, and compared with reports of Polish medieval chronicles, claims 21 or 22 children. First, the most important trace is located in the chronicle of Fredegar. It is located in the section describing a Slavic prince who had 22 sons – a similar reference does not appear in any other sources – except maybe from the Polish annals of the Middle Ages, which reported on the ruler Leszek III having a very similar number of sons. We can try to identify the ruler in Polish historical records based on similarities in descriptions, and emphasize the high statistical probability of the correctness of that interpretation. One of his many sons – most important son of Leszek III, the son of "the right bed" – was to be Popiel I. Leszek III was the ruler of the pre-Catholic Poland who shared his empire after his death among his sons, among others, Popiel I. Both Samon and Leszek III were characterized by similar tactics of warfare; they were – clever – and that's what the name of Leszek, or Lestek, is explained in the annals by its etymology. Both rulers ruled over vast empires; they were both smart – they had both a surprisingly large number of sons. If we carry out calculations using probability theory, calculating how many rulers throughout history could meet these conditions, it turns out that the sum of these probabilities is surprisingly high. One can not, of course, say with certainty that Leszek III is the Samon of the chronicle of Fredegar, but there is a very high probability that this interpretation is correct. However, we must provide a small margin of error.

== Legendary descendants ==
- Popiel I – heir to the throne
- Bolesław – inherited Lower Pomerania
- Kazimierz – inherited Kashubia
- Władysław – inherited Kashubia
- Wratysław – inherited Rania (today Mecklenburg-Vorpommern)
- Oddon – inherited Dytywonia (today Holstein)
- Barwin – inherited lower Pomerania
- Przybysław – inherited Dytywonia (today Holstein)
- Przemysław – inherited Zgorzelica (today Brandenburg)
- Jaksa – inherited White Serbia
- Semian – inherited Serbia
- Siemowit – inherited Zgorzelica (today Brandenburg)
- Siemomysł – inherited Zgorzelica (today Brandenburg)
- Bogdal – inherited lower Pomerania
- Spicygniew – inherited Bremen
- Spicymir – inherited Glain (today Lüneburg)
- Zbigniew – inherited Szczecin
- Sobiesław – inherited the Castle of Dalen (today Dahlenburg near Lüneburg)
- Wizymir – inherited Wyszomierz (today Wismar)
- Czestmir – inherited Dytywonia (today Holstein)
- Wisław – inherited Międzyborze (today Magdeburg)

== Bibliography ==
- Jerzy Strzelczyk: Mity, podania i wierzenia dawnych Słowian. Poznań: Rebis, 2007. ISBN 978-83-7301-973-7.
- Jerzy Strzelczyk: Od Prasłowian do Polaków. Kraków: Krajowa Agencja Wydawnicza, 1987. ISBN 83-03-02015-3.
