= Leszko I =

Slavic founding legend

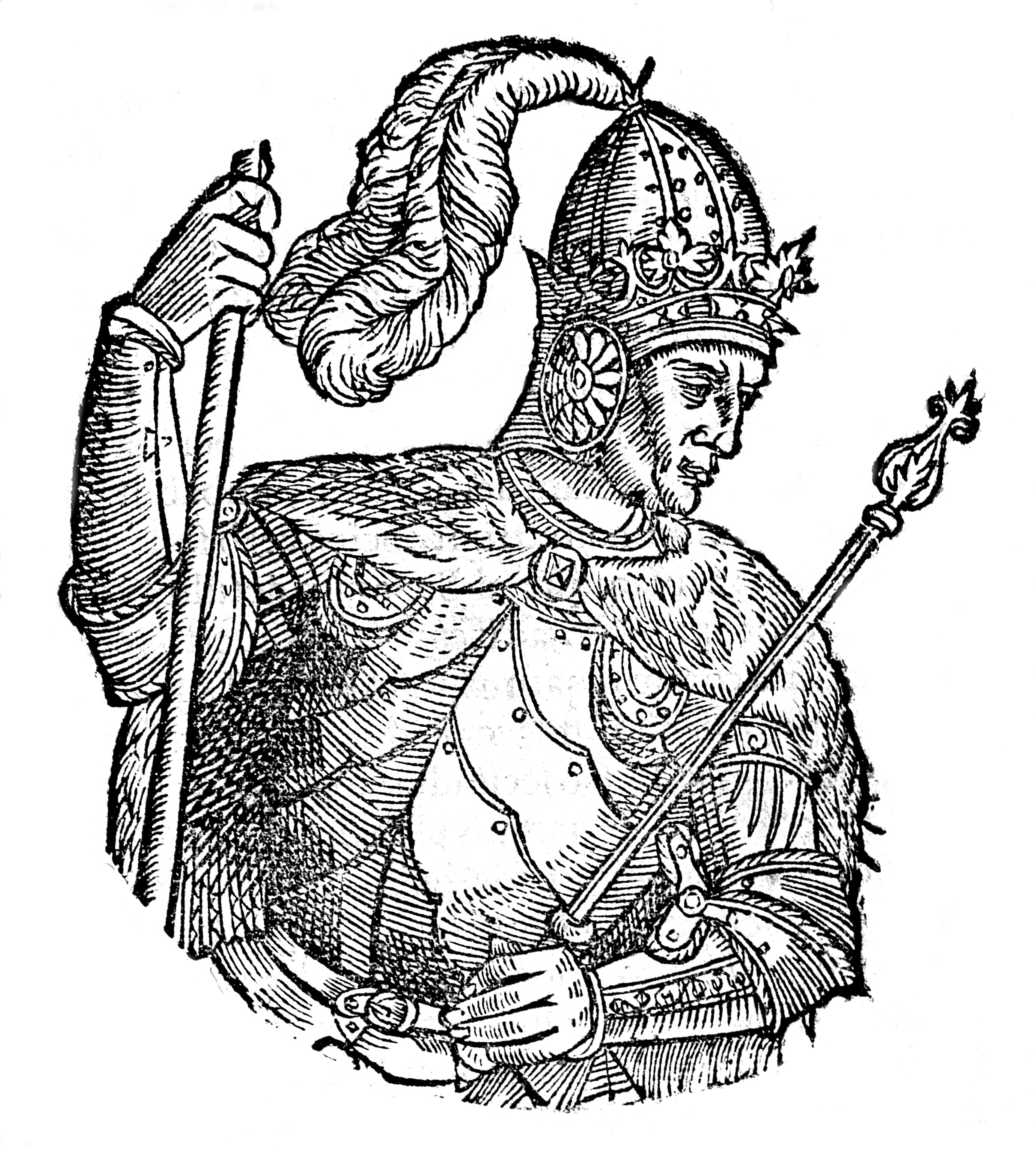
Illustration from Sarmatiae Europeae descriptio (1581).

Leszko I (Lesko, Latin: Lescus), before coronation Przemysław (Premislaus), was a legendary ruler of Poland, a goldsmith by trade and soldier who strategically defeated the Hungarians and thus was crowned. He was mentioned by Bishop Wincenty Kadłubek (1161–1223) in the Chronica seu originale regum et principum Poloniae (1190–1208). 18th century historiography dated him to 750, 760–780, or between 750 and 776. James Anderson (1680–1739) claimed he ruled for 20 years.

== Story ==
A goldsmith and soldier, he assembled his friends to attack the powerful Hungarians (and Moravians). He made helmets and breastplates out of tree bark, and enameled them, put them on poles to fool soldiers; the Hungarians supposed they were enemies, and marched towards them. Finding only forests, the Hungarians were surrounded by Premislaus' troops who attacked from all sides. The Hungarians were unable to distinguish the real soldiers from the imaginary ones and fled in fear. The captives were slaughtered, and Poland secured freedom. Premislaus took the name Lesko I and ruled peacefully. He died without issue, leaving Poland once again in conflict.

== Legacy ==
A Primislav, wearing a helmet made of oak, was used in Ragusan writer Ivan Gundulić's epic Osman (1589–1638); influenced by the Polish legend.

== Bibliography ==
- Jerzy Strzelczyk (1998). Mity, podania i wierzania dawnych Słowian. Dom Wydawniczy Rebis. ISBN 978-83-7120-688-7.; (2007) ISBN 978-83-7301-973-7.
- Jerzy Strzelczyk (1987). Od Prasłowian do Polaków. Kraków: Krajowa Agencja Wydawnicza. ISBN 83-03-02015-3.
