= Leszko II =

Slavic founding legend

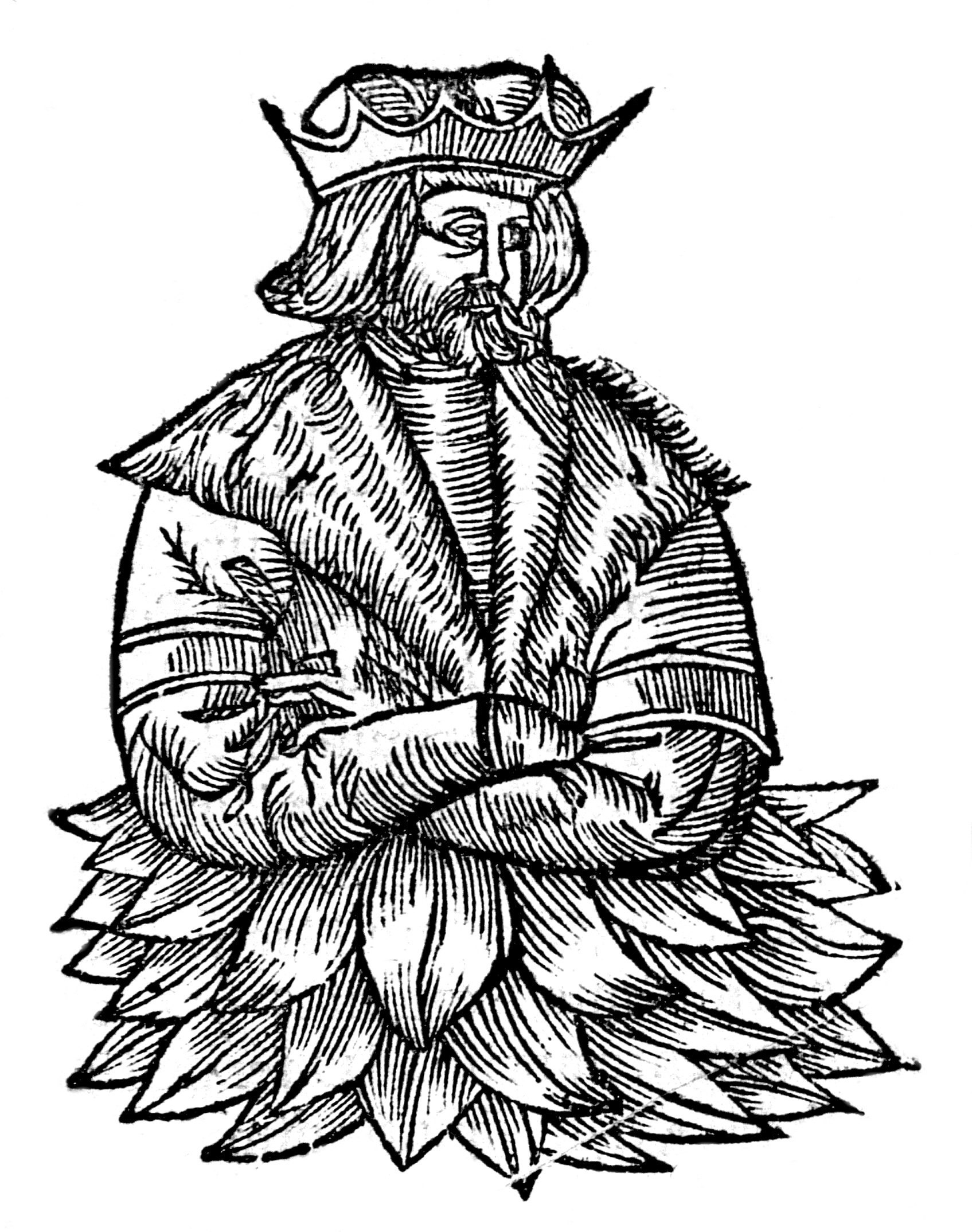
Leszko II

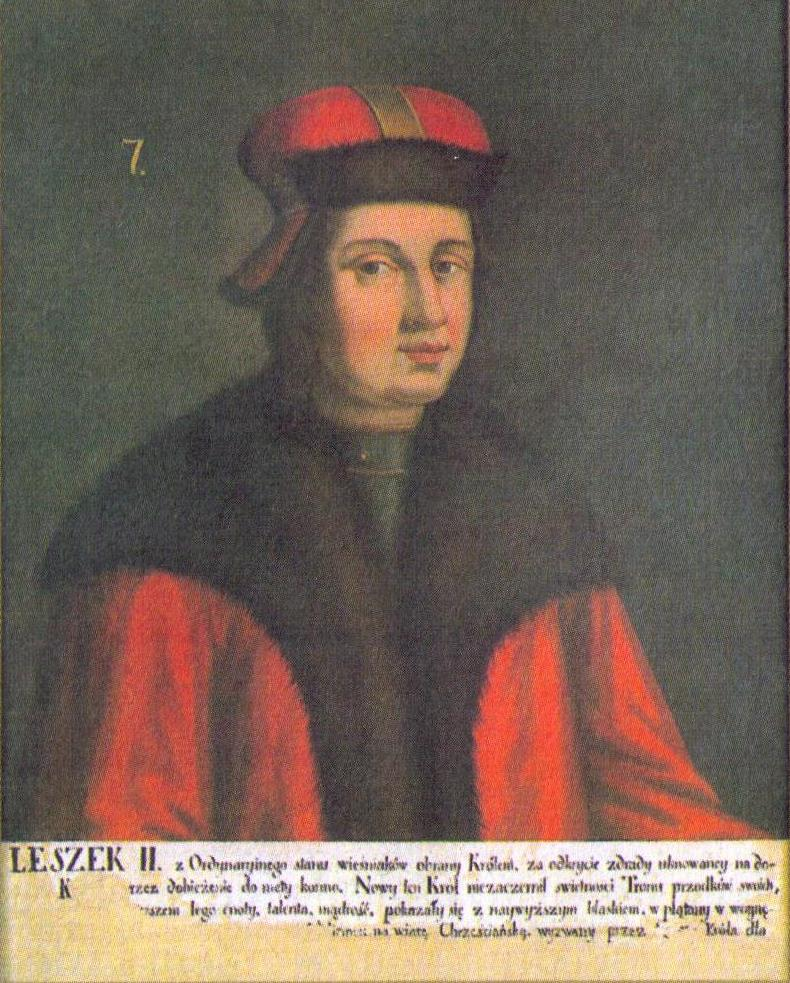
Leszko II

Leszko II (Leszek, Lestek, Lestko) was a legendary ruler of Poland, firstly mentioned by Wincenty Kadłubek in the Chronica seu originale regum et principum Poloniae. Alleged progenitor of the Popielids dynasty. Father of Leszko III.
