= Goplans =

Ethnic group

The Goplans or Goplanes (Latin: Glopeani, Polish: Goplanie) was an early West Slavic tribe that inhabited the central parts of the Kuyavia (Kujawy) region, with their probable seat at Kruszwica. They might have been named after the Lake Gopło; Kmietowicz believes the Bavarian Geographer (845) overheard it and recorded it (as Glopeani). Many remnants of small strongholds have been unearthed around the lake. The tribe was absorbed by the Polans in the 10th century.

== Bavarian Geographer ==
The medieval chronicle claims that Glopeani controlled 400 gords (fortified wooden settlements), as if the tribe was dominant in the area; however, the archeological research in Kruszwica has failed to uncover the fortress, although it does indicate the presence of a large settlement. A possible resolution has been offered by Gerard Labuda who hypothesized that the "Goplanie" were the same as, or a part of, the Polans, whose main center was located at Gniezno.

The chronicle doesn't indicate the location of the tribe; however, it can be inferred from the list of neighboring tribes and their known locations: #14 Osterabtrezi (identified as Eastern Obodrites), #15 Miloxi, #16 Phesnuzi, #17 Thadesi, #18 Glopeani, #19 Zuireani, #20 Busani (identified as Buzhans on the Bug river). The position on the list suggest the Glopeani tribe might have lived in Pomerania, Great Poland or Masovia.

== See also ==
- List of medieval Slavic tribes

== Sources ==
- Kmietowicz, Frank A. (1976). Ancient Slavs. Worzalla Publishing Company.
