= Princely houses of Poland and Lithuania =

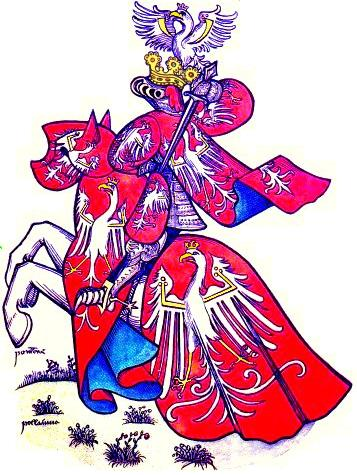
King of Poland in tournament attire, ca. 1433-1435

The princely houses of Poland and Lithuania differed from other princely houses in Europe. The Polish and Lithuanian nobility (szlachta) could not be granted noble titles by the King in the Polish-Lithuanian Commonwealth as hereditary titles, with some exceptions, were largely forbidden. Therefore, the title of prince either dated to the times before the Union of Lublin, which created the Commonwealth in 1569, or was granted to some nobles (usually magnates) by foreign kings. Due to the longstanding history of common statehood, some noble families often described as "Polish" actually originated in Grand Duchy of Lithuania and are of Lithuanian or Ruthenian descent.

== Kingdom of Poland ==
| # | Name | Coat of Arms | Title recognition | Remarks |
|---|---|---|---|---|
Royal Houses
| 1 | Piast dynasty | | c. 960 The first historical dynasty prevailing in Poland from about 960 to 1370. Their progenitor, the semi-legendary Piast the Wheelwright, son of Chościsko, came from Gniezno. According to the chronicles of Gallus Anonymus, the son of Piast the Wheelwright and his wife Rzepicha – Siemowit, became the first ruler of the Piast dynasty. Followed by Lestek and Siemomysł. The first ruler of the Piast dynasty and Civitas Schinesghe (the first recorded name related to Poland as a political entity), who historically is not questioned, was Mieszko I of Poland. | died out in 1370 in the Kingdom of Poland with the death of king Casimir III the Great; the last Silesian Piasts, who formed the oldest branch of the first Polish royal Piast dynasty, were George William, Duke of Liegnitz in 1675, and the last Silesian Piast female was Karolina, Duchess of Liegnitz-Brieg-Wohlau in 1707, in the Duchies of Silesia |
| 2 | Jagiellonian dynasty | | 1386 Princely (grand ducal) roots of this family are older, but only connected with Lithuania. Previously also known as the Gediminid dynasty in the Grand Duchy of Lithuania. The dynasty takes its name from Władysław II Jagiełło who was the Grand Duke of Lithuania between 1377–1434 and then alongside his wife queen regnant Jadwiga of Poland (reign 1384–1399) became king of Poland between 1386 and 1434. | died out in 1596 |

== Duchy of Pomerania ==
| # | Name | Coat of Arms | Title recognition | Remarks |
|---|---|---|---|---|
Dukes of Pomerania
| 1 | House of Griffins | | 1106 | died out in 1660 |
| 2 | House of Sobiesław | | 1227 | died out in 1317 (Duchy of Pomerelia) |

== Polish–Lithuanian Commonwealth ==
| # | Name | Coat of Arms | Title recognition | Estates | Remarks |
|---|---|---|---|---|---|
"Ancient" Princely Houses (Rody „stare”)
| 1 | Olelkowicz | | 1569 | Duchy of Kopylsko-Słuck | title expired in 1592 |
| 2 | Ostrogski | | 1569 | Ordynacja and Duchy of Ostroróg, Jarosław, Tarnów | title expired in 1620 |
| 4 | Borkowski | | 1499 | Duchy of Samogitia | family exists |
| 5 | Borowski | | ~1528 | Princely family of Rurikid origin, Kniaz, Kśiestwo Żmudzkie | family exists |
| 6 | Zasławski | | 1569 | Duchy of Zasław, Ordynacja and Duchy of Ostroróg | title expired in 1682 |
| 7 | Zbaraski | | 1569 | Duchy of Zbaraż | title expired in 1631 |
| 8 | Wiśniowiecki | | 1569 | Duchy of Wiśniowiec, Duchy of Łubniów, Duchy of Zbaraż | title expired in 1744 |
| 9 | Korecki | | 1569 | Duchy of Korets | title expired in 1651 |
| 10 | Sanguszko | | 1569 | Duchy of Koszyrsk, Ordynacja Ostrogska, Duchy of Zasław | family exists |
| 11 | Czartoryski | | 1569 | Duchy of Czartorysk, Duchy of Klewań, Puławy, Sieniawa | family exists |
| 12 | Czetwertyński | | 1569 | Duchy of Czetwertynia | family exists |
| 13 | Radziwiłł | | 1569 | Duchy of Birżańsk, Ordynacja and Duchy of Nieświez, Duchy of Dubienica, Ordynacja and Duchy of Ołyka, Ordynacja Kleck, Duchy of Kopylsko-Słuck | family exists |
| 14 | Tarczyński | | 1569 | Duchy of Tarczyn, | family exists |
"New" Princely Houses (Rody „nowe”)
| 14 | Lubomirski | | 1682 | Wiśnicz, Kolbuszowa, Jarosław, Przeworsk, Ordynacja Ostrogska | family exists |
| 15 | Poniatowski | | 1764 | Korsun-Shevchenkivskyi, Jabłonna, Kozienice, Grodno, Wołczyn | family exists |
| 16 | Sapieha | | 1768 | Różana, Kodeń, Horki, Zelwa | family exists |
Princes of the Partition Sejm
| 17 | Poniński | | 1773 | Września | title expired in 1920 |
| 18 | Sułkowski | | 1774 | Leszno, Ordynacja Rydzyńska | family exists |
| 19 | Jabłonowski | | 1775 | Duchy of Ostrog | title expired in 1926 |
| 20 | Massalski (Hetmans-Bishops line) | | 1775 | Lachowicze, Mysz, Werki, Druja | title expired in 1794 |
Ordynacja families
| 21 | Zamoyski (Hetman line) | | 1588 | Ordynacja Zamojska, Szarogród | title expired in 1665 |
| 22 | Zamoyski (Younger line) | | 1676 | Ordynacja Zamojska | family exists |
| 23 | Gonzaga-Myszkowski | | 1601 | Ordynacja Pińczowska | title expired in 1727 |
| 24 | Gonzaga-Myszkowski-Wielopolski | | 1729 | Ordynacja Pińczowska | family exists |
Lords of Principalities
| 25 | Potocki family | | 1696 | Duchy of Zbaraz | family exists |
| 26 | Mniszech | | 1744 | Duchy of Wiśniowiec | died out in 1905 |
Royal Houses
| 27 | Sobieski | | 1674 | Żółkiew | died out in 1737 |
| 28 | Leszczyński | | 1705 | Leszno | died out in 1766 |
Dukes of Polish fiefs
| 29 | Hohenzollern | | 1525 | Duchy of Prussia, Lębork, Bytów, Taurogi, Sereje | family exists |
| 30 | Kettler | | 1561 | Duchy of Courland and Semigallia | title expired in 1737 |
| 31 | Movilești (Mohyłowie) | | 1595 | Principality of Moldavia, Wielkie Oczy | title expired, family exists in Ukraine and Western Russia |
| 32 | Wettin | | 1759 | Duchy of Courland and Semigallia | title expired in 1763, family exists |
| 33 | Biron | | 1737 | Duchy of Courland and Semigallia | family exists |
Clergy Princes
| 34 | Bishops of Gniezno | | traditionally | Duchy of Łowicz | liquidated in 1795 |
| 35 | Bishops of Krakow | | traditionally | Duchy of Siewierz | liquidated in 1790 |
| 36 | Bishops of Warmia | | traditionally | Duchy of Warmia | liquidated in 1772 |
| 37 | Bishops of Płock | | traditionally | Duchy of Pułtusk | liquidated in 1795 |
| 38 | Provost of Płock | | traditionally | Duchy of Sieluń | liquidated in 1790 |

=== Old Lithuanian Gediminid and Ruthenian (Rurikid) Princely Houses ===
| # | Name | Coat of Arms | Remarks |
|---|---|---|---|
Princely Houses
| 1 | Giedroyć | | family exists |
| 2 | Światopełk-Mirski | | family exists |
| 3 | Drucki | | Branches: Druccy-Sokoliński, Drucki-Konopla, Drucki-Ozierecki, Drucki-Pryhabski, Drucki-Horski, Drucki-Tołoczyński, Drucki-Lubecki family exists |
| 4 | Rużyński | | died out in the 17th century |
| 5 | Kurcewicz | | family exists |
| 6 | Połubiński | | family exists |
| 7 | Łukomski | | family exists |
| 8 | Ostrożecki | | died out |
| 9 | Zasławski | | family exists |
| 10 | Porycki | | died out in 1637. Princes of Ruthenian origin in the Korybut clan. |
| 12 | Żyżemski | | perhaps died out |
| 13 | Hołowczyński | | died out in 1658 |
| 14 | Szujski | | died out in 1658 |
| 15 | Holszański | | died out |
| 16 | Szemiot / Szameit | | family exists |
| 17 | Pac | | died out in 1835 |
| 17 | Świrski | | family exists |
| 18 | Fedorowicz / Fiedorowicz | | died out |
| 19 | Gliński | | died out |

=== Princely Houses with Tatar origin ===
These princely houses lived like average rich nobility, but sometimes part of these lived like peasants.

- Ahmetowicz
- Achmetowicz
- Adamowicz
- Aksak, Axak
- Apanowicz-Białobłocki
- Assanczukowicz
- Assanowicz
- Bahryński
- Bartoszewicz
- Begimowicz
- Berbasz
- Bierbasz
- Birbasz
- Bohdanowicz
- Bułhak
- Chazbiejewicz
- Dawidowicz
- Fursowicz
- Gliński
- Grocholski
- Haraburda
- Jachicz
- Juchowski
- Jurewicz
- Juszyński
- Kadyszewicz Kejdysz
- Kambułatowicz
- Karaczewicz
- Kasymowicz
- Kieński
- Kiński
- Kordysz
- Korycki
- Korzon
- Kotłubaj
- Kryczyński
- Lebiedziewski
- Lipski
- Łostajski
- Łowczycki
- Malibakszycz
- Maluszycki
- Małyszycki
- Maślakiewicz
- Minbułatowicz
- Najman-Kadyszewicz
- Niekraszewicz
- Nowosielski
- Obulewicz
- Okęcki
- Ostryński
- Petyhorski
- Piotrowski
- Puński
- Rodkiewicz-Szpakowski
- Rudnicki
- Sayna-Kryczyński
- Siehdziński
- Skirmunt
- Smólski
- Sołtan
- Starzyński
- Sulimanowicz
- Sulkiewicz
- Szymkowicz
- Szyryński
- Talkowski
- Tarak-Buczacki
- Taraszewski
- Tuhan-Baranowski
- Ułan
- Ułan-Maluszycki
- Waliła-Łowczycki
- Zawacki
- Zackiewicz-Sulimanowicz

== Princely titles granted by foreign monarchs ==
| # | Name | Coat of Arms | Title recognition | | Remarks |
|---|---|---|---|---|---|
| 1 | Czartoryski | | 1433 | Holy Roman Empire A confirmation of the old princely title | family exists |
| 2 | Radziwiłł | | 1515/18 and 1547 | Holy Roman Empire A confirmation of the old princely title | family exists |
| 3 | Ossoliński | | 1633, 1634, 1736 | Papal States, Holy Roman Empire, France | family exists |
| 4 | Denhoff | | 1637 | Holy Roman Empire | entitled family line died out |
| 5 | Koniecpolski | | 1637 | Holy Roman Empire | entitled family line died out |
| 6 | Lubomirski | | 1647 | Holy Roman Empire | family exists |
| 7 | Jabłonowski | | 1698, 1733/34, 1743 | Holy Roman Empire | entitled family line died out |
| 8 | Sapieha/Sapieha-Rożański/Sapieha-Kodeński | | 1700 | Holy Roman Empire A confirmation of the old princely title | family exists |
| 9 | Sułkowski | | 1752 | Holy Roman Empire | family exists |
| 10 | Lichnowski | | 1773 | Prussia | family exists |
| 11 | Poniatowski | | 1765, 1847, 1850 | Austro-Hungarian Monarchy (Bohemian title of Prince), Grand Duchy of Tuscany, Austro-Hungarian Monarchy | family exists |
| 12 | Zajączek | | 1818 | Russia | title expired in 1826 |
| 13 | Łowicki | | 1820 | Russia An additional title of prince donated to the wife of Grand Duke Konstantin and for their descendants | there were not children from this marriage. The title was expired |
| 14 | Radoliński | | 1888 | Prussia | family exists |

== Kingdom of Poland (Congress Poland) ==
| # | Name | Coat of Arms | Title recognition | Remarks |
|---|---|---|---|---|
Princely Houses
| 1 | Światopełk-Mirski | | 1821 A confirmation of the old princely title | family exists |
| 2 | Puzyna | | 1823 A confirmation of the old princely title | family exists |
| 4 | Ogiński | | 1824 A confirmation of the old princely title | family exists |
| 5 | Woroniecki/Korybut-Woroniecki | | 1844 and 1852 A confirmation of the old princely title | family exists |

== See also ==
- List of Polish rulers
- List of szlachta
- List of Polish titled nobility
- Magnates of Poland and Lithuania
