= Poland in the Early Middle Ages =

The most important phenomenon that took place within the lands of Poland in the Early Middle Ages, as well as other parts of Central Europe was the arrival and permanent settlement of the West Slavic or Lechitic peoples. The Slavic migrations to the area of contemporary Poland started in the second half of the 5th century AD, about a half century after these territories were vacated by Germanic tribes fleeing from the Huns. The first waves of the incoming Slavs settled the vicinity of the upper Vistula River and elsewhere in the lands of present southeastern Poland and southern Masovia. Coming from the east, from the upper and middle regions of the Dnieper River, the immigrants would have had come primarily from the western branch of the early Slavs known as Sclaveni, and since their arrival are classified as West Slavs and Lechites, who are the closest ancestors of Poles.^{[a]}

From there the new population dispersed north and west over the course of the 6th century. The Slavs lived from cultivation of crops and were generally farmers, but also engaged in hunting and gathering. The migrations took place when the destabilizing invasions of Eastern and Central Europe by waves of people and armies from the east, such as the Huns, Avars and Magyars, were occurring. This westward movement of Slavic people was facilitated in part by the previous emigration of Germanic peoples toward the safer areas of Western and Southern Europe. The immigrating Slavs formed various small tribal organizations beginning in the 8th century, some of which coalesced later into larger, state-like ones. Beginning in the 7th century, these tribal units built many fortified structures with earth and wood walls and embankments, called gords. Some of them were developed and inhabited, others had a very large empty area inside the walls.

By the 9th century, the West Slavs had settled the Baltic coast in Pomerania, which subsequently developed into a commercial and military power. Along the coastline, remnants of Scandinavian settlements and emporia were to be found. The most important of them was probably the trade settlement and seaport of Truso, located in Prussia. Prussia itself was relatively unaffected by Slavic migration and remained inhabited by Baltic Old Prussians. During the same time, the tribe of the Vistulans (Wiślanie), based in Kraków and the surrounding region, controlled a large area in the south, which they developed and fortified with many strongholds.

During the 10th century, the Lechitic Western Polans (Polanie, lit. "people of the open fields") turned out to be of decisive historic importance. Initially based in the central Polish lowlands around Giecz, Poznań and Gniezno, the Polans went through a period of accelerated building of fortified settlements and territorial expansion beginning in the first half of the 10th century. Under duke Mieszko I of the Piast dynasty, the expanded Polan territory was converted to Christianity in 966, which is generally regarded the birth of the Polish state. The contemporary names of the realm, "Mieszko's state" or "Gniezno state", were dropped soon afterwards in favour of "Poland", a rendering of the Polans' tribal name. The Piast dynasty would continue to rule Poland until the late 14th century.

== Origin of the Slavic peoples ==
=== Slavic beginnings of Poland ===
The origins of the Slavic peoples, who arrived on Polish lands at the outset of the Middle Ages as representatives of the Prague culture, go back to the Kyiv culture, which formed beginning early in the 3rd century AD and is genetically derived from the Post-Zarubintsy cultural horizon (Rakhny–Ljutez–Pochep material culture sphere) and itself was one of the later post-Zarubintsy culture groups. Such an ethnogenetic relationship is apparent between the large Kyiv culture population and the early (6th–7th centuries) Slavic settlements in the Oder and Vistula basins, but lacking between these Slavic settlements and the older local cultures within the same region, that ceased to exist beginning in the 400–450 AD period.

=== Zarubintsy culture ===
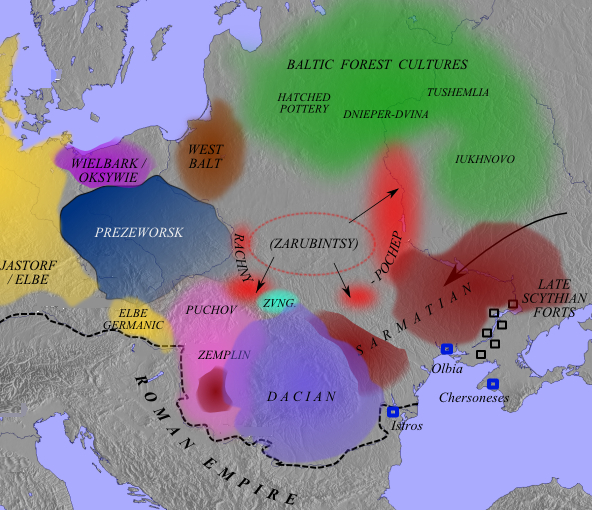
Central and East European cultures ca. 100 AD. The Zarubintsy culture is shown expanding into the Post-Zarubintsy horizon (red), the area where the Proto-Slavic people are thought to have formed.

The Zarubintsy culture circle, in existence roughly from 200 BC to 150 AD, extended along the middle and upper Dnieper and its tributary the Pripyat River, but also left traces of settlements in parts of Polesie and the upper Bug river basin. The main distinguished local groups were the Polesie group, the Middle Dnieper group and the Upper Dnieper group. The Zarubintsy culture developed from the Milograd culture in the northern part of its range and from the local Scythian populations in the more southern part. The Polesie group's origin was also influenced by the Pomeranian and Jastorf cultures. The Zarubintsy culture and its beginnings were moderately affected by La Tène culture and the Black Sea area (trade with the Greek cities provided imported items) centers of civilization in the earlier stages, but not much by Roman influence later on, and accordingly its economic development was lagging behind that of other early Roman period cultures. Cremation of bodies was practiced, with the human remains and burial gifts including metal decorations, small in number and limited in variety, placed in pits.

=== Kiev culture ===
Originating from the Post-Zarubintsy cultures and often considered the oldest Slavic culture, the Kyiv culture functioned during the later Roman periods (end of 2nd through mid-5th century) north of the vast Chernyakhov culture territories, within the basins of the upper and middle Dnieper, Desna and Seym rivers. The archaeological cultural features of the Kiev sites show this culture to be identical or highly compatible (representing the same cultural model) with that of the 6th-century Slavic societies, including the settlements on the lands of today's Poland. The Kiev culture is known mostly from settlement sites; the burial sites, involving pit graves, are few and poorly equipped. Not many metal objects have been found, despite the known native production of iron and processing of other metals, including enamel coating technology. Clay vessels were made without the potter's wheel. The Kiev culture represented an intermediate level of development, between that of the cultures of the Central European Barbaricum, and the forest zone societies of the eastern part of the continent. The Kiev culture consisted of four local formations: The Middle Dnieper group, the Desna group, the Upper Dnieper group and the Dnieper-Don group. The general model of the Kiev culture is like that of the early Slavic cultures that were to follow and must have originated mainly from the Kiev groups, but evolved probably over a larger territory, stretching west to the base of the Eastern Carpathian Mountains, and from a broader Post-Zarubintsy foundation. The Kiev culture and related groups expanded considerably after 375 AD, when the Ostrogothic state, and more broadly speaking the Chernyakhov culture, were destroyed by the Huns.^{[c]} This process was facilitated further and gained pace, involving at that time the Kiev's descendant cultures, when the Hun confederation itself broke down in the mid-5th century.

=== Written sources ===
The eastern cradle of the Slavs is also directly confirmed by a written source. The anonymous author known as the Cosmographer of Ravenna (c. 700) names Scythia, a geographic region encompassing vast areas of eastern Europe, as the place "where the generations of the Sclaveni had their beginnings". Scythia, "stretching far and spreading wide" in the eastern and southern directions, had at the west end, as seen at the time of Jordanes' writing (first half to mid-6th century) or earlier, "the Germans and the river Vistula". Jordanes places the Slavs in Scythia as well.

=== Alternative point of view ===
According to an alternative theory, popular in the earlier 20th century and still represented today, the medieval cultures in the area of modern Poland are not a result of massive immigration, but emerged from a cultural transition of earlier indigenous populations, who then would need to be regarded as early Slavs. This view has mostly been discarded, primarily due to a period of archaeological discontinuity, during which settlements were absent or rare, and because of cultural incompatibility of the late ancient and early medieval sites.^{[b]}

A 2011 article on the early Western Slavs states that the transitional period (of relative depopulation) is difficult to evaluate archaeologically. Some believe that the Late Antique "Germanic" populations (in Poland late Przeworsk culture and others) abandoned East Central Europe and were replaced by the Slavs coming from the east, others see the "Germanic" groups as staying and becoming, or already being, Slavs. Current archaeology, says the author, "is unable to give a satisfying answer and probably both aspects played a role". In terms of their origin, territorial and linguistic, "Germanic" groups should not be played off against "Slavs", as our current understanding of the terms may have limited relevance to the complex realities of the Late Antiquity and Early Middle Ages. Local languages in the region cannot be identified by archaeological studies, and genetic evaluation of cremation burial remains has not been possible.

== Slavic differentiation and expansion; Prague culture ==
=== Kolochin culture, Penkovka culture and Prague–Korchak culture ===
The final process of the differentiation of the cultures recognized as early Slavic, the Kolochin culture (over the territory of the Kyiv culture), the Penkovka culture and the Prague-Korchak culture, took place during the end of the 4th and in the 5th century CE. Beyond the Post-Zarubintsy horizon, the expanding early Slavs took over much of the territories of the Chernyakhov culture and the Dacian Carpathian Tumuli culture. As not all of the previous inhabitants from those cultures had left the area, they probably contributed some elements to the Slavic cultures.

The Prague culture developed over the western part of the Slavic expansion within the basins of the middle Dnieper, Pripyat and upper Dniester up to the Carpathian Mountains and in southeastern Poland, i.e., the upper and middle Vistula basin. This culture was responsible for most of the growth in 6th and 7th centuries, by which time it also encompassed the middle Danube and middle Elbe basins. The Prague culture very likely corresponds to the Sclaveni referred to by Jordanes, whose area he described as extending west to the Vistula sources. The Penkovka culture people inhabited the southeastern part, from Seversky Donets to the lower Danube (including the region where the Antes would be), and the Kolochin culture was located north of the more eastern area of the Penkovka culture (the upper Dnieper and Desna basins). The Korchak type designates the eastern part of the Prague-Korchak culture, which was somewhat less directly dependent on the mother Kyiv culture than its two sister cultures because of its western expansion. The early 6th-century Slavic settlements covered an area three times the size of the Kyiv culture region some hundred years earlier.

=== Early settlements, economy and burials in Poland ===
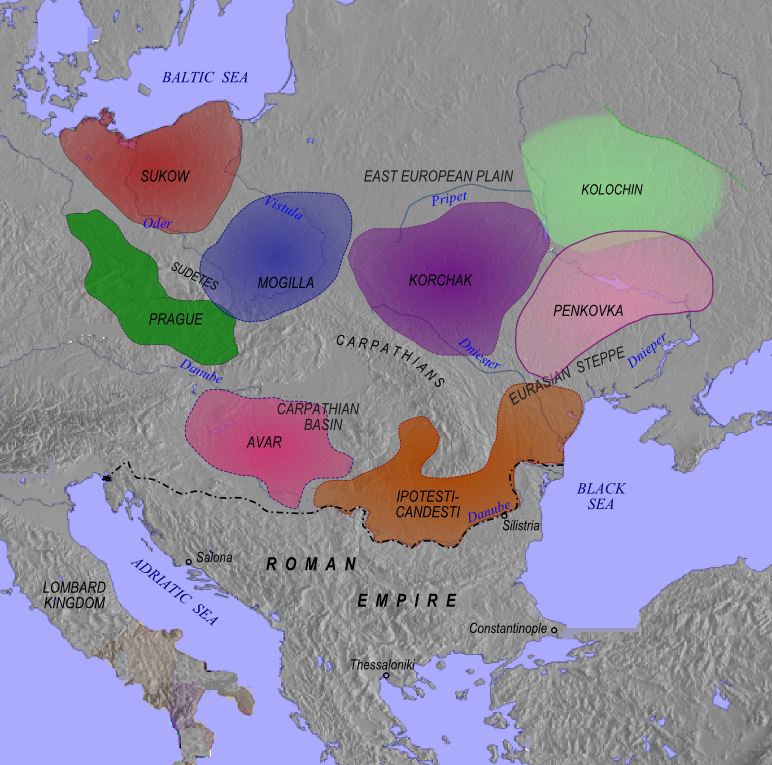
Slavic archaeological cultures c. 700 AD

In Poland, the earliest archaeological sites considered Slavic include a limited number of 6th-century settlements and a few isolated burial sites. The material obtained there consists mostly of simple, manually formed ceramics, typical of the entire early Slavic area. It is on the basis of the different varieties of these basic clay pots and infrequent decorations that the three cultures are distinguished. The largest of the earliest Slavic (Prague culture) settlement sites in Poland that have been subjected to systematic research is located in Bachórz, Rzeszów County, and dates to the second half of 5th through 7th centuries. It consisted of 12 nearly square, partially dug-out houses, each covering the area of 6.2 to 19.8 (14.0 on the average) square meters. A stone furnace was usually placed in a corner, which is typical for Slavic homesteads of that period, but clay ovens and centrally located hearths are also found. 45 newer dwellings of a different type from the 7th/8th to 9th/10th centuries have also been discovered in the vicinity.

Poorly developed handicraft and limited resources for metal working are characteristic of the communities of all early Slavic cultures. There were no major iron production centers, but metal founding techniques were known; among the metal objects occasionally found are iron knives and hooks, as well as bronze decorative items (as can be found in 7th-century finds in Haćki, Bielsk Podlaski County, a site of one of the earliest fortified settlements). The inventories of the typical small open settlements also normally include various utensils made of stone, horn and clay (including weights used for weaving). The settlements were arranged as clusters of cabins along river or stream valleys, but above their flood levels, they were usually irregular and typically faced south. The wooden frame or pillar-supported square houses covered with a straw roof had each sides of 2.5 to 4.5 meters in length. Fertile lowlands were sought, but also forested areas with diversified plant and animal environment to provide additional sustenance. The settlements were self-sufficient; the early Slavs functioned without significant long-distance trade. Potter's wheels were used from the turn of the 7th century on. Some villages larger than a few homes have been discovered in the Kraków-Nowa Huta region from the 6th to 9th century, for example a complex of 11 settlements on the left bank of the Vistula in the direction of Igołomia. The original furnishings of Slavic huts are difficult to determine, because equipment was often made of perishable materials such as wood, leather or fabrics. Free- standing clay dome stoves for bread baking have been found on some locations. Another large 6th– to 9th-century settlement complex existed in the vicinity of Głogów in Silesia.

The Slavic people cremated their dead, typical for the inhabitants of their region for centuries. The burials were usually single, the graves grouped in small cemeteries, with the ashes placed in simple urns more often than in ground indentations. The number of burial sites found is small in relation to the known settlement density. The food production economy was based on millet and wheat cultivation, hunting, fishing, gathering and cattle breeding (swine, sheep and goats bred to a lesser extent).

=== Geographic expansion in Poland and Central Europe ===
The earliest Slavic settlers from the east reached southeastern Poland in the second half of the 5th century, specifically the San river basin, then the upper Vistula regions, including the Kraków area and Nowy Sącz Valley. Single early sites are also known around Sandomierz and Lublin in Masovia and Upper Silesia. Somewhat younger settlement concentrations were discovered in Lower Silesia. In the 6th century, the above areas were settled. At the end of this century, or in the early 7th century, the Slavic newcomers reached Western Pomerania. According to the Byzantine historian Theophylact Simocatta, the Slavs captured in Constantinople in 592 named the Baltic Sea coastal area as the place from which they originated.

As of that time and in the following decades, Western Pomerania, plus some of Greater Poland, Lower Silesia and some areas west of the middle and lower Oder River made up the Sukow-Dziedzice culture group. Its origin is the subject of debate among archaeologists. First settlements appear in the early 6th century and cannot be directly derived from any other Slavic archaeological culture. They reveal certain similarities to the artifacts of the Dobrodzień group of the Przeworsk culture. According to scholars such as Siedow, Kurnatowska and Brzostowicz, it might be a direct continuation of the Przeworsk tradition. According to allochthonists, it represents a variant of the Prague culture and is considered its younger stage. The Sukow-Dziedzice group shows significant idiosyncrasies, such as no graves and (typical for the rest of the Slavic world) rectangular dwellings set partially below the ground level were found within its span.

This particular pattern of expansion into the lands of Poland and then Germany was a part of the great Slavic migration during the 5th-7th centuries from originating lands in the east to various countries of Central and Southeastern Europe. Another 6th-century route, more southern, took the Prague culture of the Slavs through Slovakia, Moravia and Bohemia. The Slavs also reached the eastern Alps and populated the Elbe and the Danube basins, from where they moved south to occupy the Balkans as far as Peloponnese.

=== Ancient and early Medieval written accounts of the Slavs ===
Besides the Baltic Veneti (see Poland in Antiquity article), ancient and medieval authors speak of the East European, or Slavic Venethi. It can be inferred from Tacitus' description in Germania that his "Venethi" possibly lived around the middle Dnieper basin, which in his times would correspond to the Proto-Slavic Zarubintsy cultural sphere. Jordanes, to whom the Venethi meant Slavs, wrote of past fighting between the Ostrogoths and the Venethi that took place during the third quarter of the 4th century in today's Ukraine. At that time, the Venethi therefore would have been people of the Kyiv culture. The Venethi, Jordanes reported, "now rage in war far and wide, in punishment for our sins", and were at that time made obedient to the Gothic king Hermanaric. Jordanes' 6th-century description of the "populous race of the Venethi" includes indications of their dwelling places in the regions near the northern ridge of the Carpathian Mountains and stretching from there "almost endlessly" east, while in the western direction reaching the sources of the Vistula. More specifically, he designates the area between the Vistula and the lower Danube as the country of the Sclaveni. "They have swamps and forests for their cities" (hi paludes silvasque pro civitatibus habent), he added sarcastically. The "bravest of these peoples", the Antes, settled the lands between the Dniester and the Dnieper rivers. The Venethi were the third Slavic branch of an unspecified location (most likely of the Kolochin culture), as well as the overall designation for the totality of the Slavic peoples, who "though off-shoots from one stock, have now three names".

Procopius in De Bello Gothico located the "countless Antes tribes" even further east, beyond the Dnieper. Together with the Sclaveni, they spoke the same language, of an "unheard of barbarity". According to Jordanes, the Heruli nation traveled in 512 across all of the Sclaveni peoples territories, and then west of there through a large expanse of unpopulated lands, as the Slavs were about to settle the western and northern parts of Poland in the decades to follow. All of the above is in good accordance with the findings of today's archaeology.

Byzantine writers held the Slavs in low regard for the simple life they led and also for their supposedly limited combat abilities, but in fact they were already a threat to the Danubian boundaries of the Empire in the early 6th century, where they waged plundering expeditions. Procopius, the anonymous author of Strategicon, and Theophylact Simocatta wrote at some length on how to deal with the Slavs militarily, which suggests that they had become a formidable adversary. John of Ephesus actually goes as far as saying in the last quarter of the 6th century that the Slavs had learned to conduct war better than the Byzantine army. The Balkan Peninsula was indeed soon overrun by the Slavic invaders during the first half of the 7th century under Emperor Heraclius.

The above-mentioned authors provide various details on the character, living conditions, social structure and economic activities of the early Slavic people, some of which are confirmed by the archaeological discoveries in Poland, since the Slavic communities were quite similar all over their range. Their uniform Old Slavic language remained in use until the 9th to 12th centuries, depending on the region. The Greek missionaries Saints Cyril and Methodius from Thessaloniki, where "everybody fluently spoke Slavic", were expected to be able to communicate in distant Moravia without any difficulty when sent there in 863 by the Byzantine ruler.

=== Invasions of the Avars in Europe and their presence in Poland ===
In the 6th century, the Turkic-speaking nomadic Avars moved into the middle Danube area. Twice (in 562 and 566–567), the Avars undertook military expeditions against the Franks, and their routes went through the Polish lands. The Avar envoys bribed Slavic chiefs from the lands they did not control, including Pomerania, to secure their participation in Avar raids, but other than that, the exact nature of their relations with the Slavs in Poland is not known. The Avars had some presence or contacts in Poland also in the 7th and 8th centuries, when they left artifacts in the Kraków-Nowa Huta region and elsewhere, including a bronze belt decoration found in the Krakus Mound. This last item, from the turn of the 8th century, is used to date the mound itself.^{[d]}

== Tribal differentiation ==
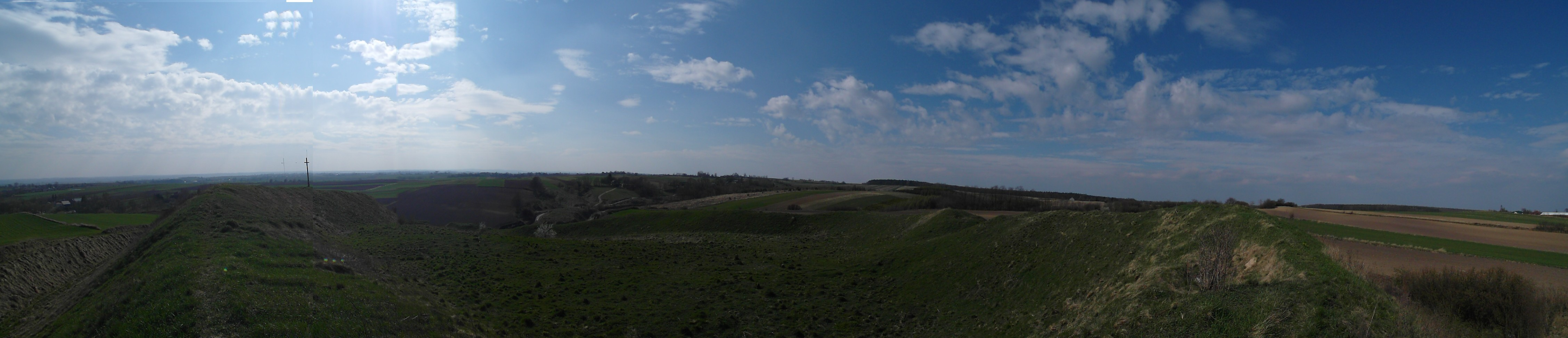
Settlement in Stradów (9th century AD), the largest stronghold in contemporary Poland

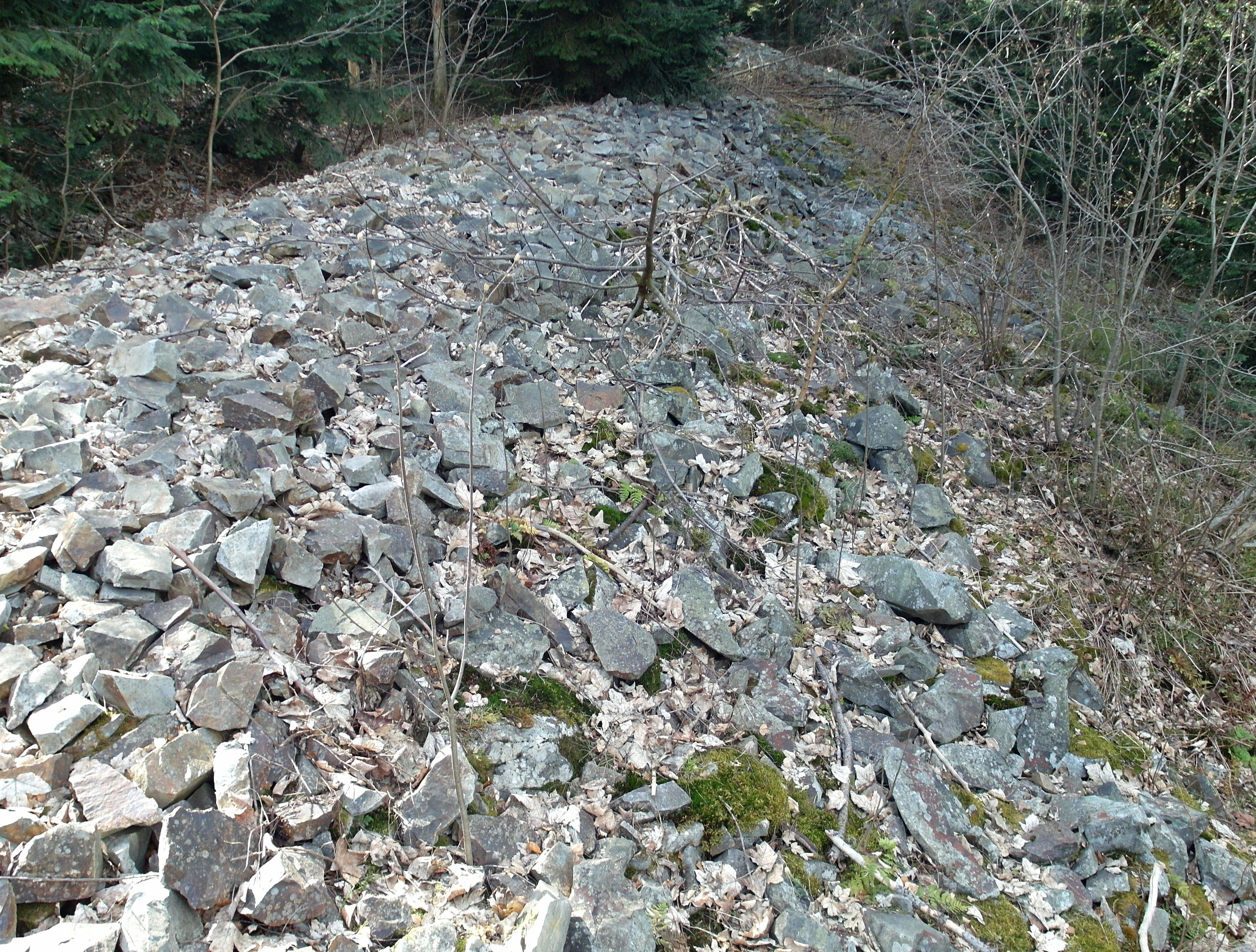
Pagan cult wall (8–9th century BC) in Łysa Góra

=== 8th-century settlements ===
With the major population shifts of the Slavic migrations completed, the 8th century brought a measure of stability to the Slavic people settled in Poland. About one million people actively utilized no more than 20–25% of the land; the rest was mainly forest. Normal settlements, with the exception of a few fortifications and cult venues, were limited to lowland areas below 350 meters above the sea level. Most villages built without artificial defensive structures were located within valley areas of natural bodies of water. The Slavs were very familiar with the water environment and used it as natural defense.

The living and economic activity structures were either distributed randomly or arranged in rows or around a central empty lot. The larger settlements could have had over a dozen homesteads and be occupied by 50 to 80 residents, but more typically there were just several homes with no more than 30 inhabitants. From the 7th century on, the previously common semi-subterranean dwellings were being replaced by buildings wholly above the surface, but still consisted of just one room. Pits were dug for storage and other uses. As the Germanic people before them, the Slavs left vacant regions between developed areas for separation from strangers and to avoid conflicts, especially along the limits of their tribal territories.

=== Gord construction ===
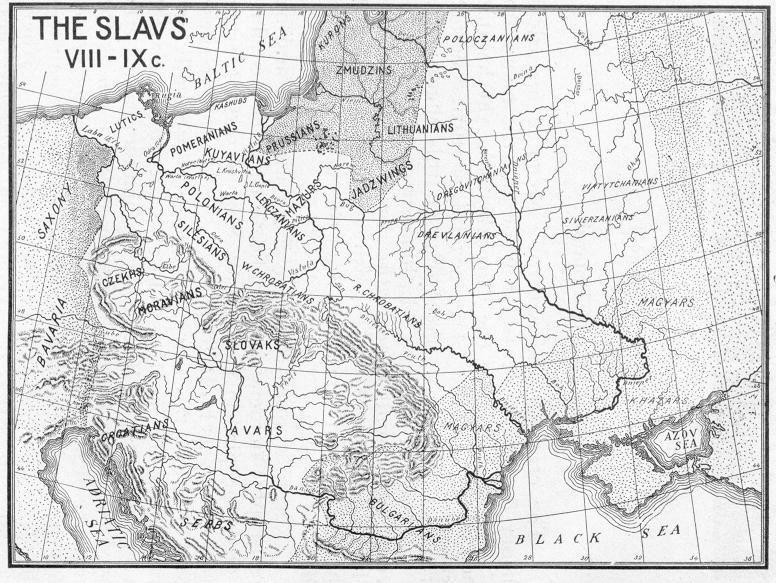
Slavic peoples around the 8th and 9th centuries

The Polish tribes did build more imposing structures than the simple dwellings in their small communities: fortified settlements and other reinforced enclosures of the gord (Polish "gród") type. These were established on naturally suitable, defense-enhancing sites beginning in the late 6th or 7th century. Szeligi near Płock and Haćki are the early examples. A large-scale building effort took place in the 8th century. The gords were differently designed and of various sizes, from small to impressively massive. Ditches, walls, palisades and embankments were used to strengthen the perimeter, which often involved a complicated earthwork besides wood and stone construction. Gords of the tribal period were irregularly distributed across the country (there were fewer larger ones in Lesser Poland, but more smaller ones in central and northern Poland), and could cover an area from 0.1 to 25 hectares. They could have a simple or multi-segment architecture and be protected by fortifications of different types. Some were permanently occupied by a substantial number of people or by a chief and his cohort of armed men, while others were utilized as refuges to protect the local population in case of external danger. Beginning in the 9th century, the gords became the nuclei of future urban developments, attracting tradesmen of all kinds, especially in strategic locations. Gords erected in the 8th century have been researched extensively, for example the ones in Międzyświeć (Cieszyn County, Gołęszyce tribe) and Naszacowice (Nowy Sącz County). The last one was destroyed and rebuilt four times, with the final reconstruction completed after 989.

A monumental and technically complex border protection area gord of over 3 hectares in size was built around 770–780 in Trzcinica near Jasło on the site of an old Bronze Age era stronghold, probably the seat of a local ruler and his garrison. Thousands of relics were found there, including a silver treasure of 600 pieces. The gord was set afire several times and ultimately destroyed during the first half of the 11th century.^{[e]}

This larger scale building activity, from the mid-8th century on, was a manifestation of the emergence of tribal organisms, a new civilizational quality that represented rather efficient proto-political organizations and social structures on a new level. They were based on these fortifications, defensive objects, of which the mid-8th century and later Vistulan gords in Lesser Poland are a good example. The threat coming from the Avar state in Pannonia could have had provided the original motivation for the construction projects.

=== Society organized into larger tribal units ===
From the 8th century on, the Slavs in Poland increasingly organized themselves in larger structures known as "great tribes," either through voluntary or forced association. The population was primarily involved in agricultural pursuits. Fields were cultivated as well as gardens within settlements. Plowing was done using oxen and wooden plows reinforced with iron. Forest burning was used to increase the arable area, but also to provide fertilizer, as the ashes lasted in that capacity for several seasons. Rotation of crops was practiced as well as the winter/spring crop system. After several seasons of exploitation, the land was being left idle to regain fertility. Wheat, millet and rye were most important crops; other cultivated plant species included oat, barley, pea, broad bean, lentil, flax and hemp, as well as apple, pear, plum, peach and cherry trees in fruit orchards. Beginning in the 8th century, swine gradually became economically more important than cattle; sheep, goats, horses, dogs, cats, chickens, geese and ducks were also kept. The agricultural practices of the Slavs are known from archaeological research, which documents progressive increases over time in arable area and resulting deforestation, and from written reports provided by Ibrahim ibn Yaqub, a 10th-century Jewish traveler. Ibrahim described also other features of Slavic life, for example the use of steam baths. The existence of bath structures has been confirmed by archaeology. An anonymous Arab writer from the turn of the 10th century mentions that the Slavic people made an alcoholic beverage out of honey and their celebrations were accompanied by music played on the lute, tambourines and wind instruments.

Gathering, hunting and fishing were still essential as sources of food and materials such as hide or fur. The forest was also exploited as a source of building materials such as wood. In addition, wild forest bees were kept there, and the forest could be used as a place of refuge. Until the 9th century, the population was separated from the main centers of civilization and self-sufficient with primitive, local community and household-based manufacturing. Specialized craftsmen existed only in the fields of iron extraction from ore and processing, and pottery; the few luxury items used were imports. From the 7th century on, modestly decorated ceramics were made with the potter's wheel. 7th– to 9th-century collections of objects have been found in Bonikowo and Bruszczewo, Kościan County (iron spurs, knives, clay containers with some ornamentation) and in the Kraków-Nowa Huta region (weapons and utensils in Pleszów and Mogiła), among other places. Slavic warriors were traditionally armed with spears, bows and wooden shields. Axes were used later, and still swords of the types popular throughout 7th– to 9th-century Europe were also used. Independent of distant powers, the Slavic tribes in Poland lived a relatively undisturbed life, but at the cost of some backwardness in civilization.

A qualitative change took place in the 9th century, when the Polish lands were crossed again by long-distance trade routes. Pomerania become a part of the Baltic trade zone, while Lesser Poland participated in trade centered in the Danubian countries. In the Upper Vistula basin, Oriental silver jewelry and Arab coins, often cut into pieces, "grzywna" iron coin equivalents (of the type used in Great Moravia) and even linen cloths served as currency.

The basic social unit was the nuclear family, consisting of parents and their children, which had to fit in a dwelling area of several to 25 square meters. The "big family," a patriarchal, multi-generational group of related families with the meaning of a kin or clan, was of declining importance during this period. A larger group was needed in the past (5th–7th centuries) for forest clearing and burning undertakings, when farming communities had to shift from location to location; in the 8th-century phase of agriculture, a family was sufficient to take care of their arable land. A concept of agricultural land ownership was gradually developing, at this point a family, not individual prerogative. Several or more clan territories were grouped into a neighborhood association, or "opole", which established a rudimentary self-government. Such a community was the owner of forested land, pastures, bodies of water and within it took place the first organization around common projects and the related development of political power. A big and resourceful opole could become, by extending its possessions, a proto-state entity vaguely referred to as a tribe. The tribe was the top level of this structure. It would contain several opoles and control a region of up to about 1500 square kilometers, where internal relationships were arbitrated and external defense organized.

A general assembly of all tribesmen took care of the most pressing of issues. Thietmar of Merseburg wrote in the early 11th century of the Veleti, a tribe of Polabian Slavs, with a report that their assembly kept deliberating till everybody agreed, but this "war democracy" was gradually being replaced by a government system in which the tribal elders and rulers had the upper hand. This development facilitated the coalescing of tribes into "great tribes," some of which under favorable conditions would later become tribal states. The communal and tribal democracy, with self-imposed contributions by the community members, survived in small entities and local territorial subunits the longest. On a larger scale, it was being replaced by the rule of able leaders and then dominant families, ultimately leading inevitably to hereditary transition of supreme power, mandatory taxation, service etc. When social and economic evolution reached this level, the concentration of power was facilitated and made possible to sustain by parallel development of a professional military force (called at this stage "drużyna") at the ruler's or chief's disposal.

=== Burials and religion ===
Burial customs, at least in southern Poland, included raising kurgans. The urn with the ashes was placed on the mound or on a post thrust into the ground. In that position, few such urns survived, which may be the reason why Slavic burial sites in Poland are rare. All dead, regardless of social status, were cremated and afforded a burial, according to Arab testimonies (one from the end of the 9th century and another one from about 930). A Slavic funeral feast practice was also mentioned earlier by Theophylact Simocatta.

According to Procopius, the Slavs believed in one god, the creator of lightning and master of the entire universe, to whom all sacrificial animals (and sometimes people) were offered. The highest god was called Svarog throughout the Slavic area, but other gods were also worshiped in different regions at different times, often with local names. Natural objects such as rivers, groves or mountains were also celebrated, as well as nymphs, demons, ancestral and other spirits, who were all venerated and appeased by offering rituals, which also involved augury. Such beliefs and practices were later developed and individualized by the many Slavic tribes.

The Slavs erected sanctuaries, created statues and other sculptures, including the four-faced Svetovid, whose carvings symbolize various aspects of the Slavic cosmology model. One 9th-century specimen from the Zbruch River in modern Ukraine, found in 1848, is on display at the Archaeological Museum in Kraków. Many of the sacred locations and objects were identified outside Poland, for example in northeastern Germany or Ukraine. In Poland, religious activity sites have been investigated in northwestern Pomerania, including Szczecin, where a three-headed deity once stood, and the Wolin island, where 9th– to 11th-century cult figurines were found. Archaeologically confirmed cult places and figures have also been researched at several other locations.

== Early Slavic states and other 9th-century developments ==
=== Samo's realm ===
The first Slavic state-like entity, the realm of King Samo, originally a Frankish trader, flourished close to Poland in Bohemia and Moravia, parts of Pannonia and more southern regions between the Oder and Elbe rivers during the period 623–658. Samo became a Slavic leader by helping the Slavs defend themselves successfully against Avar assailants. What Samo led was probably a loose alliance of tribes, and it fell apart after his death. Slavic Carantania, centered on Krnski Grad (now Karnburg in Austria), was more of a real state, developed possibly from one part of the disintegrating Samo's kingdom, but lasted under a native dynasty throughout the 8th century and became Christianized.

=== Great Moravia and the establishment of a written Slavic language ===
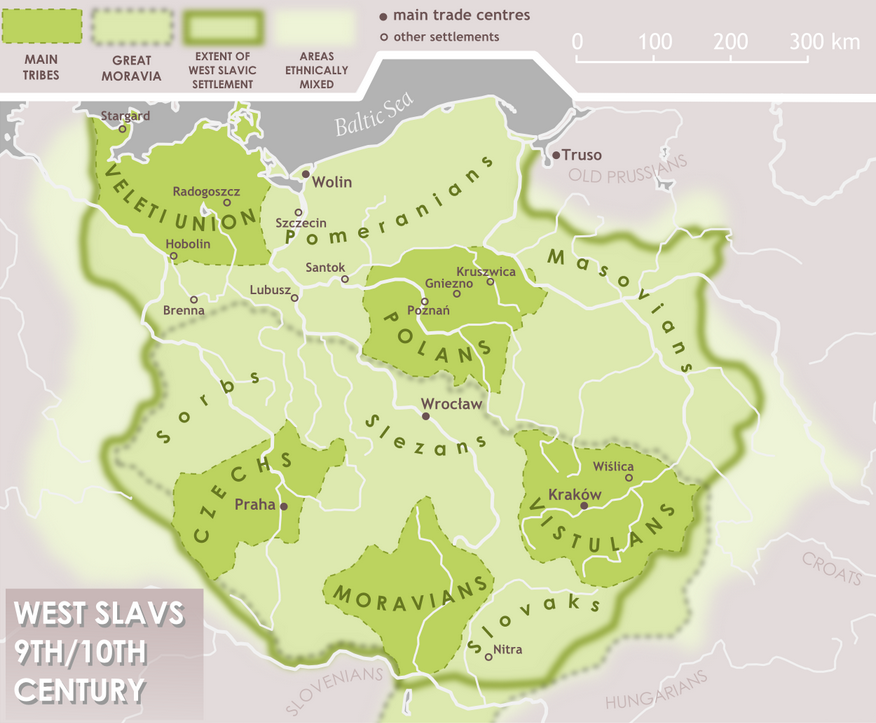
The lands of the West Slavs as specified in a historical map often reproduced in the 20th century

Larger scale state-generating processes developed in Slavic areas in the 9th century. Great Moravia, the most prominent Slavic state of the era, became established in the early 9th century south of modern Poland. The original lands of Great Moravia included what is now Moravia and western Slovakia, plus parts of Bohemia, Pannonia and southern regions of Lesser Poland. The glory of the Great Moravian empire became fully apparent in light of archaeological discoveries; lavishly equipped burials are especially spectacular. Such finds do not extend to the lands that now constitute southern Poland, however. The great territorial expansion of Great Moravia took place during the reign of Svatopluk I at the end of the 9th century. The Moravian state collapsed quite suddenly; in 906, weakened by an internal crisis and Magyar invasions, it ceased to exist entirely.

In 831, Mojmir I was baptized, and his Moravian state became a part of the Bavarian Passau diocese. Aiming to achieve ecclesiastical as well as political independence from East Frankish influence, his successor Rastislav asked the Byzantine emperor Michael III for missionaries. As a result, Cyril and Methodius arrived in Moravia in 863 and commenced missionary activities among the Slavic people there. To further their goals, the brothers developed a written Slavic liturgical language: Old Church Slavonic, which employed the Glagolitic alphabet created by them. They translated the Bible and other church texts into this language, thus establishing a foundation for the later Slavic Eastern Orthodox churches.

=== The Czech state ===
The fall of Great Moravia made room for the expansion of the Czech or Bohemian state, which likewise incorporated some of the Polish lands. The founder of the Přemyslid dynasty, Prince Bořivoj, was baptized by Methodius in the Slavic rite during the later part of the 9th century and settled in Prague. His son and successor Spytihněv was baptized in Regensburg in the Latin Church, which marks the early stage of East Frankish/German influence in Bohemian affairs, which was destined to be decisive. Borivoj's grandson Prince Wenceslaus, the future Czech martyr and patron saint, was killed, probably in 935, by his brother Boleslaus. Boleslaus I solidified the power of the Prague princes and most likely dominated the Vistulan and Lendian tribes of Lesser Poland and at least parts of Silesia.

=== 9th-century Polish lands ===
In the 9th century the Polish lands were still on the peripheries of medieval Europe as regards its major powers and events, but a measure of progress did take place in levels of civilization, as evidenced by the number of gords built, kurgans raised and movable equipment used. The tribal elites must have been influenced by the relative closeness of the Carolingian Empire; objects crafted there have occasionally been found. Poland was populated by many tribes of various sizes. The names of some of them, mostly from the western part of the country, are known from written sources, especially a Latin document written in the mid-9th century by the anonymous Bavarian Geographer. During this period, smaller tribal structures were disintegrating while larger ones were being established in their place.

Characteristic of the turn of the 10th century in most Polish tribal settlement areas was a particular intensification of gord building activity. The gords were the centers of social and political life. Tribal leaders and elders had their headquarters in their protected environment and some of the tribal general assemblies took place inside them. Religious cult locations were commonly located in the vicinity, while the gords themselves were frequently visited by traders and artisans.

=== The Vistulan state ===
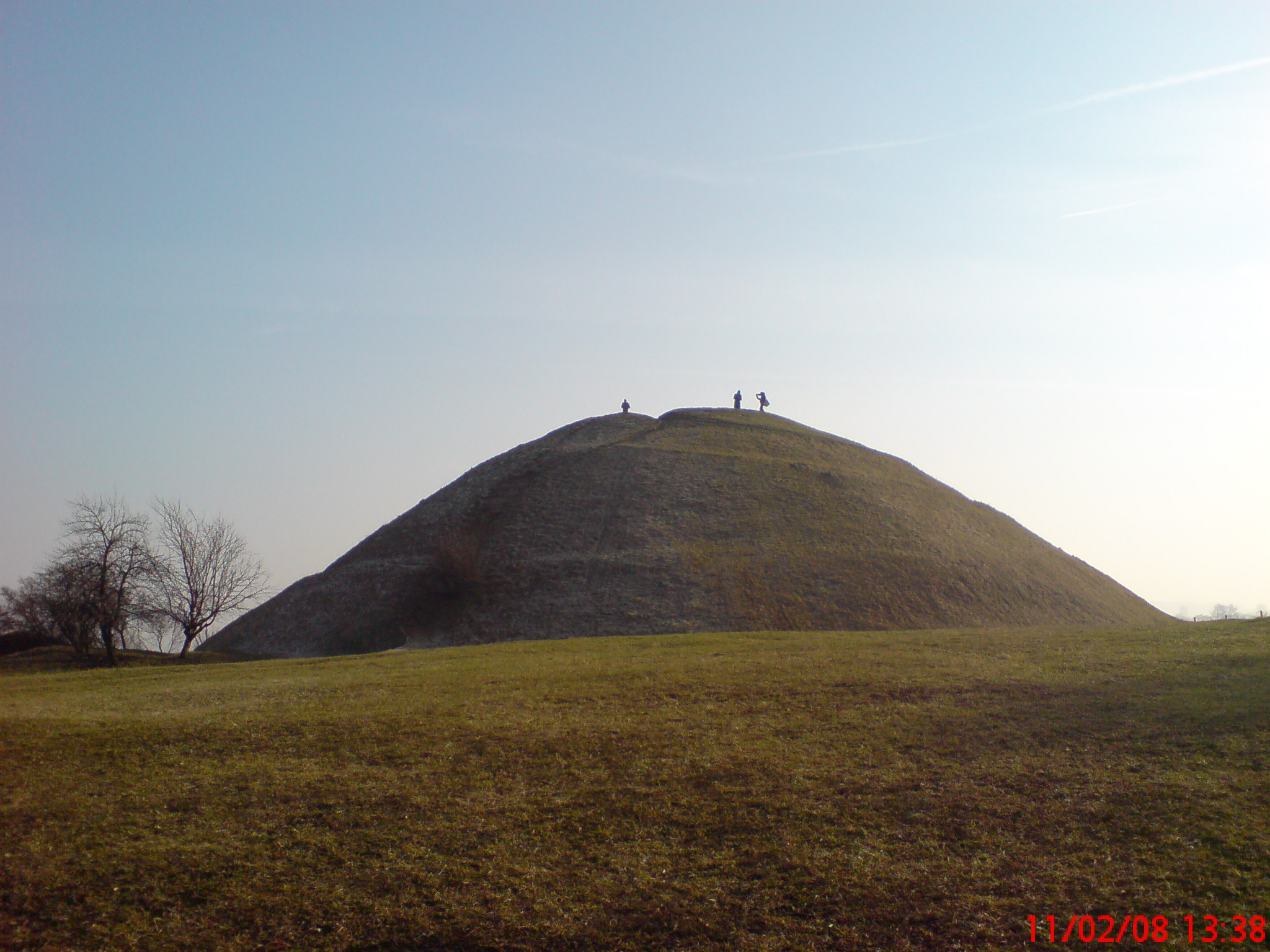
Krakus Mound

A major development of the 9th century period concerns the somewhat enigmatic Wiślanie, or Vistulans (Bavarian Geographer's Vuislane) tribe. The Vistulans of western Lesser Poland, mentioned in several contemporary written sources, were already a large tribal union in the first half of the 9th century. In the second half of the century, they were evolving into a super-tribal state until their efforts were terminated by more powerful neighbors from the south. Kraków, the main town of the Vistulans, with its Wawel gord, was located along a major "international" trade route. The main Vistulan-related archaeological find is a late 9th-century treasure of iron-ax shaped grzywnas, well known as currency units in Great Moravia. They were discovered in 1979 in a wooden chest below the basement of a medieval house on Kanonicza Street in Kraków near the Vistula River and Wawel Hill. The total weight of the iron material is 3630 kilograms and the individual bars of various sizes (4212 of them) were bound in bundles, which suggests that the package was being readied for transportation. Other finds include the 8th-century Krakus, Wanda and other large burial mounds, and the remnants of several gords)

Vistulan gords, built from the mid-8th century on, were typically very large, often over 10 hectares in size. About 30 big ones are known. The 9th-century gords in Lesser Poland and in Silesia were likely built as a defense against Great Moravian military expansion. The largest one, in Stradów, Kazimierza Wielka County, had an area of 25 hectares and walls or embankments 18 meters high, but parts of this giant structure were probably built later. The gords were often located along the northern slope of the western Carpathian Mountains, on hills or hillsides. The buildings inside the walls were sparsely located or altogether absent, so for the most part, the role of the gords seems to have been something other than that of settlements or administrative centers.

Large mounds up to 50 meters in diameter are found not only in Kraków, but also in Przemyśl and Sandomierz. among other places (about 20 total). They were probably funeral locations of rulers or chiefs, with the actual burial site, on the top of the mound, long lost. Besides the mounds, the degree of gord development and the grzywna treasure point to Kraków as the main center of Vistulan power (instead of Wiślica, as also suspected in the past).

The most important written references to Vistulans come from The Life of Saint Methodius, also known as "The Pannonian Legend", most likely written by disciples of Methodius right after his death in 885. The fragment speaks of a very powerful pagan prince who resided in the Vistulan country, reviled the Christians and caused them great harm. He was warned by emissaries speaking on behalf of the missionary and advised to reform and voluntarily accept baptism in his own homeland. Otherwise, it was predicted, he would be forced to do so in a foreign land. According to the Pannonian Legend, that is exactly what eventually did happen. This passage is widely interpreted as an indication that the Vistulans were invaded and overrun by the army of Great Moravia and their pagan prince captured. This would have had to have happened during Methodius' second stay in Moravia, between 873 and 885, during the reign of Svatopluk I.

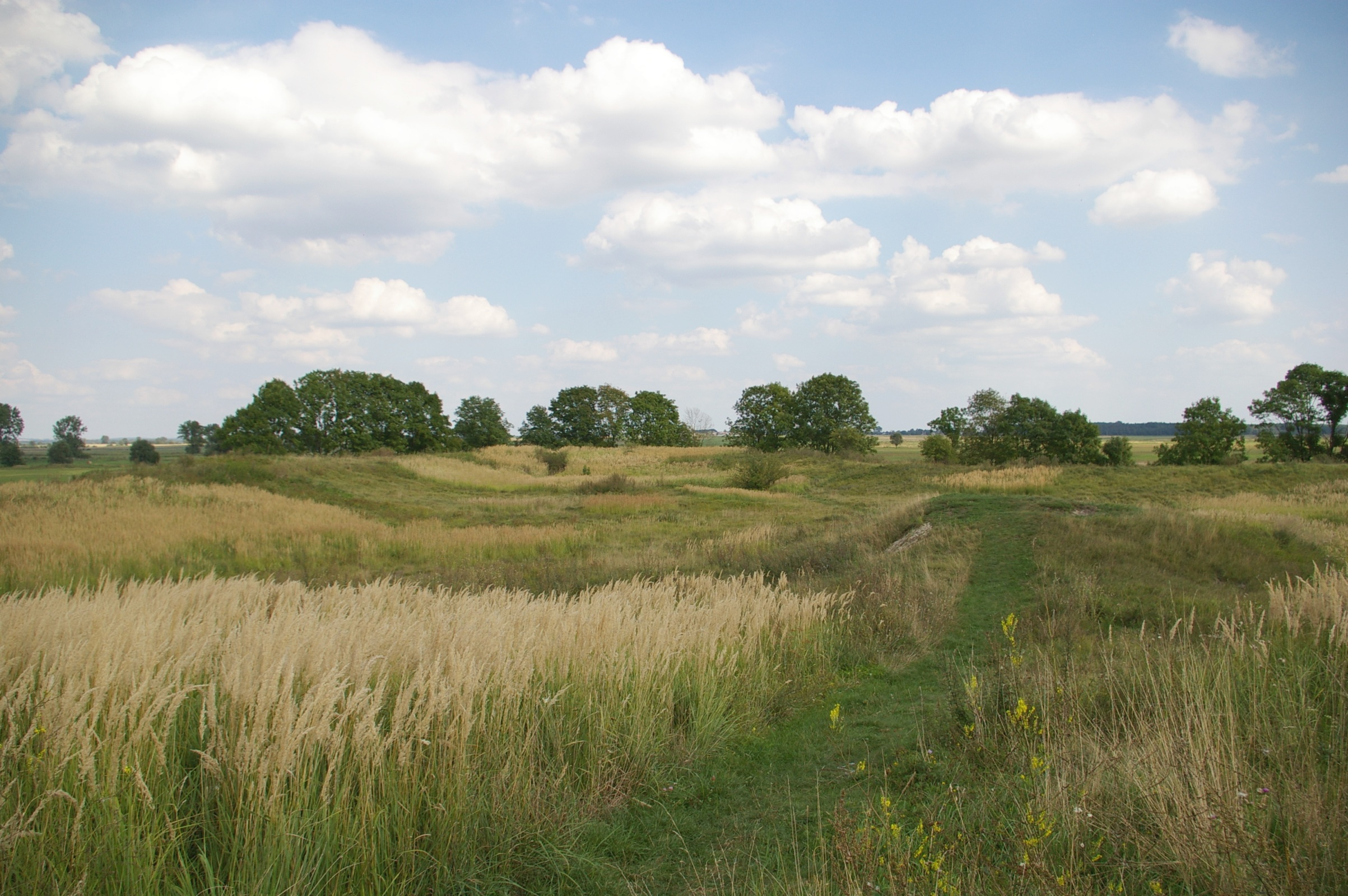
A Vistulan stronghold in Wiślica once stood here

A further elaboration on this story is possibly found in a chronicle of Wincenty Kadłubek written some three centuries later. The chronicler, inadvertently or intentionally mixing different historic eras, talks of a past Polish war with the army of Alexander the Great. The countless enemy soldiers thrust their way into Poland, and the king himself, having previously subjugated the Pannonians, entered through Moravia as if it were a back door. He victoriously unfolded the wings of his forces and conquered the Kraków area lands and Silesia, in the process leveling Kraków's ancient city walls. The evidence of a dozen or more gords attacked and destroyed in southern Lesser Poland at the end of 9th century lends some archaeological credence to this fanciful version of events.

East of the Vistulans, Eastern Lesser Poland was the territory of the Lendian tribe (Lędzianie, the Bavarian Geographer's "Lendizi"). In the mid-10th century Constantine VII wrote their name as Lendzaneoi. The Lendians had to be a very substantial tribe, since the names for Poland in the Lithuanian and Hungarian languages and for the Poles in medieval Ruthenian all begin with the letter "L" and are derived from the name of this tribe. The Poles historically have also referred to themselves as "Lechici". After the fall of Great Moravia, the Magyars controlled at least part of the territory of the Lendians. They were conquered by Kievan Rus' during 930–940. At the end of the 10th century, the Lendian lands became divided; the western part was taken by Poland, the eastern portion retained by Kievan Rus'.

The Vistulans were probably also subjected to Magyar raids as an additional layer of embankments was often added to the gord fortifications in the early part of the 10th century. In the early or mid-10th century, the Vistulan entity, like Silesia, was incorporated by Boleslaus I of Bohemia into the Czech state. This association turned out to be beneficial in terms of economic development, because Kraków was an important station on the Prague—Kiev trade route. The first known Christian church structures were erected on Wawel Hill. Later in the 10th century, under uncertain circumstances, but in a peaceful way (the gord network suffered no damage on this occasion), the Vistulans became a part of the Piast Polish state.

=== The Baltic coast ===
In terms of economic and general civilizational achievement, the most advanced region that corresponds to the modern boundaries of Poland in the 9th century was Pomerania. It was also characterized by the most extensive contacts with the external world, and accordingly, the greatest cultural richness and diversity. Pomerania was a favorite destination for traders and other entrepreneurs from distant lands, some of whom established local manufacturing and trade centers; those were usually accompanied by nearby gords inhabited by the local elite. Some of these complexes gave rise to early towns or urban centers such as Wolin, Pyrzyce or Szczecin. The Bavarian Geographer mentioned two tribes, the Velunzani ("Uelunzani") and Pyritzans ("Prissani") in the area, each with 70 towns. Despite the high level of economic advancement, no social structures indicative of statehood developed in Farther Pomeranian societies, except for the Wolin city-state.

The Wolin settlement was established on the island of the same name in the late 8th century. Located at the mouth of the Oder River, Wolin from the beginning was involved with long distance Baltic Sea trade. The settlement, thought to be identical with both Vineta and Jomsborg, was pagan, multiethnic, and readily kept accepting newcomers, especially craftsmen and other professionals, from all over the world. Being located on a major intercontinental sea route, it soon became a major European industrial and trade power. Writing in the 11th century, Adam of Bremen recognized Wolin as one of the largest European cities, inhabited by honest, good-natured and hospitable Slavic people, together with other nationalities, from Greeks to barbarians, including the Saxons, as long as they did not demonstrate their Christianity too openly.

Wolin was the major stronghold of the Volinian tribal territory, comprising the island and a broad stretch of the adjacent mainland, with its frontier guarded by a string of gords. The city's peak of prosperity occurred around and after year 900, when a new seaport was built (the municipal complex had now four of them) and the metropolitan area was secured by walls and embankments. The archaeological findings there include a great variety of imported goods (even from the Far East) and locally manufactured products and raw materials; amber and precious metals figure prominently, as jewelry was one of the mainstay economic activities of the Wolinian elite.

Truso in Prussia was another Baltic seaport and trade emporium known from the reworking of Orosius' universal history by Alfred the Great. King Alfred included a description of a voyage undertaken around 890 by Wulfstan from the Danish port of Hedeby to Truso, which is located near the mouth of the Vistula. Wulfstan gave a rather detailed description of the location of Truso, within the land of the Aesti, yet close to the Slavic areas west of the Vistula. Truso's actual site was discovered in 1982 at Janów Pomorski, near Elbląg.

Established as a seaport by the Vikings and Danish traders at the end of the 8th century in the Prussian border area previously already explored by the Scandinavians, Truso lasted as a major city and commercial center until the early 11th century, when it was destroyed and replaced in that capacity by Gdańsk. The settlement covered an area of 20 hectares and consisted of a two-dock seaport, the craft-trade portion, and the peripheral residential development, all protected by a wood and earth bulwark separating it from the mainland. The port-trade and craftsmen zones were themselves separated by a fire control ditch with water flowing through it. There were several rows of houses, including long Viking hall structures, waterside warehouses, market areas and wooden beam covered streets. Numerous relics were found there, including weights used also as currency units, coins (from English to Arab) and workshops processing metal, jewelry or large quantities of amber. Remnants of long Viking boats were also found, the whole complex being a testimony to Viking preoccupation with commerce, the mainstay of their activities around the Baltic Sea region. The multi-ethnic Truso had extensive trade contacts not only with distant lands and Scandinavia, but also the Slavic areas located to the south and west of it, from where ceramics and other products were transported along the Vistula in river crafts. Ironically, Truso's sudden destruction by fire and subsequent disappearance was apparently a result of a Viking raid.^{[f]}

This connection to the Baltic trade zone led to an establishment of inner-Slavic long-distance trade routes. Lesser Poland participated in exchange centered in the Danubian countries. Oriental silver jewelry and Arab coins, often cut into pieces, "grzywna" iron coin equivalents (of the type used in Great Moravia) in the Upper Vistula basin and even linen cloths served as currency.

=== Magyar intrusion ===
The Magyars were at first yet another wave of nomadic invaders. Of the Uralic languages family, coming from northwestern Siberia, they migrated south and west, occupying the Pannonian Basin from the end of the 9th century. From there, until the second half of the 10th century, when they were forced to settle, they raided and pillaged vast areas of Europe, including Poland. A saber and ornamental elements were found in a Hungarian warrior's grave from the first half of the 10th century in the Przemyśl area.

Geographically, the Magyar invasions interfered with the previously highly influential contacts between Central Europe and centers of Byzantine Christianity. It may have been the decisive factor that steered Poland toward the Western (Latin) branch of Christianity by the time of its adoption in 966.

== 10th-century developments in Greater Poland; Mieszko's state ==
=== Tribal Greater Poland ===
The 10th century brought a notable development in the form of settlement stability on Polish lands. Short-lived prehistoric settlements gradually gave way to villages on fixed sites. The number of villages grew with time, but their sites rarely shifted. The population distribution patterns established from that century on are evident on today's landscape.

Sources from the 9th and 10th centuries make no mention of the Polan (Polanie) tribe. The closest thing would be the huge (400 gords) Glopeani tribe of the Bavarian Geographer, whose name seems to be derived from that of Lake Gopło, but archaeological investigations cannot confirm any such scale of settlement activity in Lake Gopło area. What the research does indicate is the presence of several distinct tribes in 9th-century Greater Poland, one around the upper and middle Obra river basin, one in the lower Obra basin, and another one west of the Warta River. There was the Gniezno area tribe, whose settlements were concentrated around the regional cult center: the Lech Hill of today's Gniezno. Throughout the 9th century, the Greater Poland tribes did not constitute a uniform entity or whole in the cultural, or settlement pattern sense. The centrally located Gniezno Land was at that time rather isolated from external influences, such as from the highly developed Moravian-Czech or Baltic Sea centers. Such separation was probably a positive factor by facilitating the efforts of a lineage of leaders from an elder clan of a tribe there, known as the Piast House, which resulted in the early part of the 10th century in the establishment of an embryonic Polish state.

=== Mieszko's state and its origins ===
What was later to be called the Gniezno state, also known as Mieszko's state, was first expanded at the expense of the subdued tribes in the era of Mieszko's father and grandfather. Writing around 965 or 966 Ibrahim ibn Yaqub described the country of Mieszko, "the king of the North",^{[g]} as the most wide-ranging of the Slavic lands. Mieszko, the ruler of the Slavs, was also mentioned as such at that time by Widukind of Corvey in his Res gestae saxonicae. In its mature form, this state included the West Slavic lands between the Oder and Bug rivers and between the Baltic Sea and the Carpathian Mountains, including the economically crucial mouth areas of the Vistula and Oder rivers, as well as Lesser Poland and Silesia.

The name of Poles (Polanians, Polyans, Polans) appears in writing for the first time around year 1000, just like the country's name Poland (Latinized as Polonia). "Polanie" was possibly the name given by later historians to the inhabitants of Greater Poland (a presumed tribe not mentioned in earlier sources). 10th-century inhabitants of Greater Poland would originate from tribes not known by name that were instrumental in bringing about the establishment of the Polish state; one such tribe had to constitute the immediate power base of Mieszko's predecessors, if not Mieszko himself.

=== The account of Gallus Anonymus vs. archaeology ===
In the early 12th century, the chronicler Gallus Anonymus wrote down or invented a legend about the Piast dynasty. Amid miraculous details, the story offers the names of the supposed ancestors of the royal family, beginning with a man named Chościsko, the father of the central figure Piast the Wheelwright, who was a humble farmer living in Gniezno and married to Rzepka. According to Gallus, the male heads of the Piast clan following after him were Siemowit, Lestek, Siemomysł and Mieszko I, the first "Piast" known with historic certainty. Gallus expressed his own misgivings concerning the trustworthiness of the royal story he passed on, but he did consider the sequence of the last three names of Mieszko's predecessors to be reliable.

The results of archaeological studies of 9th- and 10th-century gords in Greater Poland are at odds with the timing of this story. There was no Gniezno settlement in the 9th century; there was a pagan cult site there beginning only at the turn of the 10th century. The Gniezno gord was built around year 940, possibly because the location, of great spiritual importance to the tribal community, would rally the local population around its building and defense.

=== The early Piast state and its expansion ===
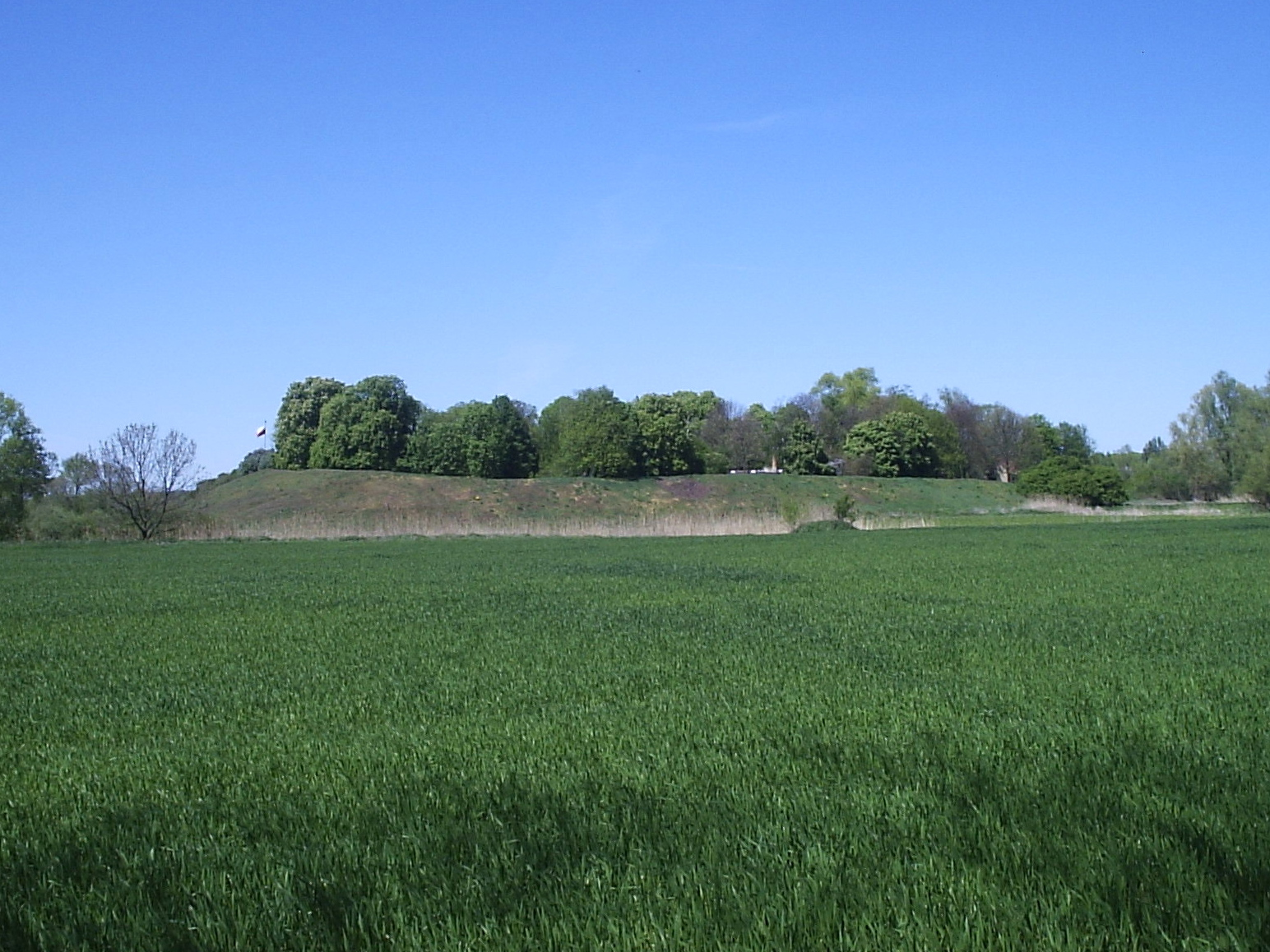
Remnants of the Piast gord in Giecz

Under the old tribal system, the tribal assembly elected a chief in case of an external threat to lead the defense effort, and it was a temporarily granted authority. The Piast clan was able to replace this practice in the Gniezno area with a hereditary ruler, in line with trends in other locations at the time. This allowed the Piast clan to create a state that they could rule over generations.

The development of the Piast state can be traced to some degree by following the disappearance of the old tribal gords, many of them built in Greater Poland during the later part of the 9th century and soon thereafter, which were destroyed by the advancing Gniezno tribal population. The gords in Spławie, Września County and in Daleszyn, Gostyń County, for example, both built soon after 899, were attacked and taken over by the Piast state forces, the first one burned during the initial period of the armed expansion. The old gords were often rebuilt or replaced beginning in the first decades of the 10th century by new, large and massively reinforced Piast gords. Connected by water communication lines, the powerful gords of the mid-10th century served as the main concentrations of forces of the emerging state.

Parallel with the gord building activity of ca. 920–50, the Piasts undertook military expansion by crossing the Warta River and moving south and west within the Oder river basin. The entire network of tribal gords between the Obra and Barycz rivers, among other places, was eliminated. The conquered population was often resettled to central Greater Poland, which resulted in partial depopulation of previously well-developed regions. At the end of this stage of the Piast state formation new Piast gords were built in the (north) Noteć River area and other outlying areas of the annexed lands, for example in Santok and Śrem around 970. During the following decade the job of unifying the core of the early Piast state was finished—besides Greater Poland with Kujawy it included also much of central Poland. Masovia and parts of Pomerania found themselves increasingly under the Piast influence, while the southbound expansion was for the time being stalled, because large portions of Lesser Poland and Silesia were controlled by the Czech state.

The expanding Piast state developed a professional military force. According to Ibrahim ibn Yaqub, Mieszko collected taxes in the form of weights used for trading and spent those taxes as monthly pay for his warriors. He had three thousand heavily armored mounted soldiers alone, whose quality according to Ibrahim was very impressive. Mieszko provided for all their equipment and needs, even military pay for their children regardless of their gender, from the moment they were born. This force was supported by a much greater number of foot fighters. Numerous armaments were found in the Piast gords, many of them of foreign, e.g. Frankish or Scandinavian origin. Mercenaries from these regions, as well as German and Norman knights, constituted a significant element of Mieszko's elite fighting guard.

=== Revenue generating measures and conquests ===
To sustain this military machine and meet other state expenses, large amounts of revenue were necessary. Greater Poland had some natural resources used for trade, such as fur, hide, honey and wax, but those surely did not provide enough income. According to Ibrahim ibn Yaqub, Prague in Bohemia, a city built of stone, was the main center for the exchange of trading commodities in this part of Europe. From Kraków, the Slavic traders brought tin, salt, amber and whatever other products they had, most importantly slaves; Muslim, Jewish, Hungarian and other traders were the buyers of the Prague slave market. The Life of St. Adalbert, written at the end of the 10th century by John Canaparius, records the fate of many Christian slaves sold in Prague as the main curse of the time. Dragging of shackled slaves is shown as a scene in the bronze 12th-century Gniezno Doors. It may well be that the territorial expansion financed itself by being the source of loot, of which the captured local people were the most valuable part. The scale of the human trade practice is arguable, however, because much of the population from the defeated tribes was resettled for agricultural work or in the near-gord settlements, where they could serve the victors in various capacities and thus contribute to the economic and demographic potential of the state. Considerable increase of population density was characteristic of the newly established states in eastern and Central Europe. Because the slave trade not sufficient to meet all revenue needs, the Piast state had to look for other options.

Mieszko thus strove to subdue Pomerania at the Baltic coast. The area was the site of wealthy trade emporia, frequently visited by traders, especially from the east, west and north. Mieszko had every reason to believe that great profits would have resulted from his ability to control the rich seaports situated on long distance trade routes such as Wolin, Szczecin and Kołobrzeg.

The Piast state reached the mouth of the Vistula first. Based on the investigations of the gords erected along the middle and lower Vistula, it appears that the lower Vistula waterway was under Piast control from about the mid-10th century. A powerful gord built in Gdańsk, under Mieszko at the latest, solidified Piast rule over Pomerelia. However, the mouth of the Oder was firmly controlled by the Jomsvikings and the Volinians, who were allied with the Veleti. "The Veleti are fighting Mieszko", reported Ibrahim ibn Yaqub, "and their military might is great". Widukind wrote about events of 963 that involved the person of the Saxon count Wichmann the Younger, an adventurer exiled from his country. According to Widukind, "Wichmann went to the barbarians (probably the Veleti or the Wolinians) and leading them (...) defeated Mieszko twice, killed his brother, and acquired a great deal of spoils". Thietmar of Merseburg also reports that Mieszko with his people became subjects of the Holy Roman Emperor in 963, together with other Slavic entities such as the Lusatians who were forced into subjection by the powerful Margrave Gero of the Saxon Eastern March.

=== Mieszko's relationship with Emperor Otto I ===
Series of military reverses and detrimental relationships, which involved the Czech Přemyslids allied with the Veleti besides rivals, compelled Mieszko to seek the support of the German Emperor Otto I. After the contacts were made, Widukind described Mieszko as "a friend of the emperor". A pact was negotiated and finalized no later than 965. The price Mieszko had to pay for the imperial protection was acceptance of the status of the emperor's vassal. He paid him tribute from the lands up to the Warta River and very likely also made a promise to accept Christianity.

=== Mieszko's acceptance of Christianity ===
In response to immediate practical concerns, the Christian Church was installed in Poland in its Western Latin Church,^{[h]} an act that brought Mieszko's country into the sphere of ancient Mediterranean culture. Of the issues requiring urgent attention, the preeminent one was the increasing pressure of the eastbound expansion of the German state (between the Elbe and the Oder rivers) and its plans to control the parallel expansion of the Church through the archdiocese in Magdeburg, the establishment of which was finalized in 968.

The so-called Baptism of Poland and the attendant processes did not take place through Mieszko's German connections. At that time, Mieszko was in the process of fixing an uneasy relationship with the Bohemian state of Boleslaus I. The difficulties were caused mainly by Czech cooperation with the Veleti. Already in 964, the two parties arrived at an agreement on that and other issues. In 965, Mieszko married Boleslaus' daughter Doubravka. Mieszko's chosen Christian princess, a woman possibly in her twenties, was a devout Christian and Mieszko's own conversion had to be a part of the deal. This act in fact followed in 966 and initiated the Christianization of Greater Poland, a region that up to that point had not been exposed to Christian influence, unlike Lesser Poland and Silesia. In 968, an independent missionary bishopric, reporting directly to the pope, was established, with Jordan installed as the first bishop.

The scope of the Christianization mission in its early phase was quite limited geographically, and the few relics that have survived come from Gniezno Land. Stone churches and baptisteries were discovered within the Ostrów Lednicki and Poznań gords, and a chapel in Gniezno. Poznań was also the site of the first cathedral, the bishopric seat of Jordan and Bishop Unger, who followed him.

=== The early expansion of the Piasts, Great Moravian and Norman contributions ===
Newer research points out some other intriguing possibilities regarding the early origins of the Polish state in Greater Poland. There are indications that the processes that led to the establishment of the Piast state began during the period ca. 890–910. During these years, a tremendous civilizational advancement took place in central Greater Poland, as the unearthed products of all kinds that have been discovered are better made and more elaborate. The timing coincides with the breakdown of the Great Moravian state caused by the Magyar invasions. Before and after its fall in 905–07, many Great Moravian people, fearing for their lives, had to escape. According to the notes made by Constantine VII, they found refuge in neighboring countries. Decorations found in Sołacz graves in Poznań have their counterparts in burial sites around Nitra in Slovakia. In the Nitra area, there was also in medieval times a well-known clan named Poznan. The above indicates that the Poznań town was established by Nitran refugees, and more generally, the immigrants from Great Moravia contributed to the sudden awakening of the otherwise remote and isolated Piast lands.

The early expansion of the Gniezno Land tribe very likely began under Mieszko's grandfather Lestek, the probable real founder of the Piast state. Widukind's chronicle speaks of Mieszko ruling a Slavic nation called "Licicaviki", which was what Widukind made out of "Lestkowicy": the people of Lestko, or Lestek. Lestek was also reflected in the sagas of the Normans, who may have played a role in Poland's origins (an accumulation of treasures from the period 930–1000 is attributed to them). Siemomysł and then Mieszko continued after Lestek, whose tradition was alive within the Piast court when Bolesław III Wrymouth named one of his sons after him and Gallus Anonymous wrote his chronicle. The term "Lechici", popular later as a synonym for "Poles", may also have been inspired by Mieszko's grandfather.

=== Early capitals, large scale gord construction ===
There is some disagreement as to the early seat of the ruling clan. Modern archaeology has shown that the gord in Gniezno did not even exist before about 940. This fact eliminates the possibility of Gniezno's early central role, which is what had long been believed, based on the account given by Gallus Anonymus. The relics found in Giecz (including a great concentration of silver treasures), where the original gord was built some 80 years earlier, point to that location. Other likely early capitals include the old gords of Grzybowo, Kalisz or Poznań. Poznań, which is older than Gniezno, was probably the original site of Mieszko's court in the earlier years of his reign. The first cathedral church, a monumental structure, was erected there. The events of 974–78, when Mieszko, like his brother-in-law Boleslaus II of Bohemia, supported Henry II, Duke of Bavaria, in his rebellion against Otto II, created a threat of the emperor's retribution. The situation probably motivated Mieszko to move the government to Gniezno, which was safer due to its more eastern location. The emperor's response turned out to be ineffective, but this geographical advantage continued in the years to come. The growing importance of Gniezno was reflected in the addition around 980 of a new southern part to the original two segments of the gord. In the existing summary of the Dagome iudex document written in 991–92 before Mieszko's death, Mieszko's state is referred to as Civitas Gnesnensis, or the Gniezno State.

The enormous effort of the estimated population of 100 to 150 thousand residents of the Gniezno region who were involved in building or modernizing Gniezno and several other main Piast gords was made in response to a perceived deadly threat, not just to help them pursue regional conquests. After 935, when the Gniezno people were probably already led by Mieszko's father Siemomysł, the Czechs conquered Silesia and soon moved also against Germany. The fear of desecration of their tribal cult center by the advancing Czechs could have mobilized the community. A Polabian Slav uprising was suppressed around 940 by Germany under Otto I, and the eastbound moving Saxons must have added to the sense of danger at that time (unless the Piast state was already allied with Otto, helping restrain the Polabians). When the situation stabilized, the Piast state consolidated and the huge gords turned out to be handy for facilitating the Piast's own expansion, led at this stage by Siemomysł.

=== Alliance with Germany and conquest of Pomerania ===
Fighting the Veleti from the beginning of Mieszko's rule led to an alliance of his state with Germany. The alliance was natural at this point, because the German state was expanding eastbound as the Polish state was expanding westbound, with the Veleti common target in between. A victory was achieved in September of 967, when Wichmann, this time leading forces of the Volinians, was killed, and Mieszko, helped by additional mounted units provided by his father-in-law Boleslaus, had his revenge. Mieszko's victory was recognized by the Emperor Otto I as the turning point in the struggle to contain the Polabian Slavs, which had distracted him from pursuing his Italian policies. This new status allowed Mieszko to pursue his efforts to obtain for his country an independent bishopric. The Poles thus had their own bishopric before the Czechs, whose tradition of Christianity was much older. The victory of 967, as well as the successful fighting with Margrave Hodo that followed in the Battle of Cedynia of 972, allowed Mieszko to conquer further parts of Pomerania. Wolin however remained autonomous and pagan. Kołobrzeg, where a strong gord was built around 985, was probably the actual center of Piast power in Pomerania. Before, a Scandinavian colony in Bardy-Świelubie near Kołobrzeg functioned as the center of this area. The western part of Mieszko controlled Pomerania (the region referred to by Polish historians as Western Pomerania, roughly within the current Polish borders, as opposed to Gdańsk Pomerania or Pomerelia), which became independent of Poland during the Pomeranian uprising of 1005, when Poland was ruled by Mieszko's son Bolesław.

=== Completion of Poland's territorial expansion under Mieszko ===
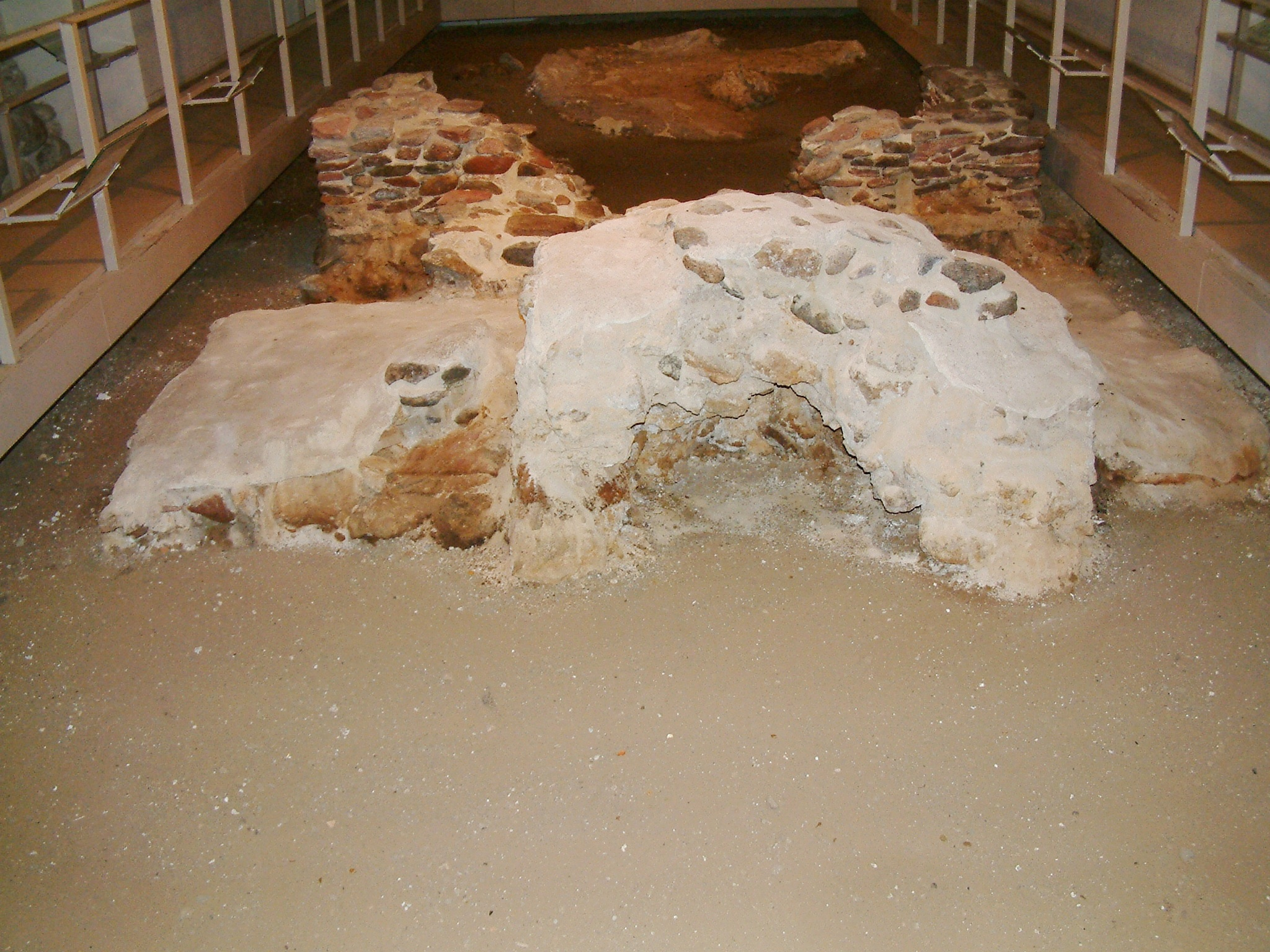
The grave site found at the Poznań Cathedral could have had belonged to Mieszko, or, as is considered more likely now, to Bishop Jordan

Around 980, in the west, Lubusz Land also came under Mieszko's control and another important gord was built in Włocławek much further east. Masovia was still more loosely associated with the Piast state, while the Sandomierz region was for a while their southern outpost.

The construction of powerful Piast gords in western Silesia region along the Oder (Głogów, Wrocław and Opole) took place by 985 at the latest. The alliance with the Czechs was by that time over; Queen Doubravka, a member of the Czech royal family, died in 977. Mieszko, allied with Germany, then fought the Přemyslids and took over part of Silesia and then also eastern Lesser Poland (the Lendian lands). In 989, Kraków with the rest of Lesser Poland was taken over. That region, autonomous under the Czech rule, also enjoyed a special status within the Piast state. In 990, eastern Silesia was added, which completed the Piast takeover of southern Poland. By the end of Mieszko's life, his state included the West Slavic lands in geographic proximity and connected by natural features to the Piast territorial nucleus of Greater Poland. Those lands have sometimes been regarded by historians as "Lechitic", or ethnically Polish, even though in the 10th century, all the western Slavic tribes, including the Czechs, were quite similar linguistically.

Silver treasures, common in the Scandinavian countries, are found also in Slavic areas including Poland, especially northern Poland. Silver objects, coins and decorations, often cut into pieces, are believed to have served as currency units, brought in by Jewish and Arab traders, but locally more as accumulations of wealth and symbols of prestige. The process of hiding or depositing them, besides protecting them from danger, is believed by the researchers to represent a cult ritual.

A treasure located in Góra Strękowa, Białystok County, hidden after 901, includes dirhem coins minted between 764 and 901 and Slavic decorations made in southern Ruthenia that show Byzantine influence. This find is a manifestation of a 10th-century trade route running all the way from Central Asia through Byzantium, Kiev, the Dnieper and Pripyat rivers basins and Masovia to the Baltic Sea shores. Such treasures most likely belonged to members of the emerging elites.

== See also ==
- Prehistory and protohistory of Poland
- Stone Age Poland
- Bronze and Iron Age Poland
- Poland in Antiquity
- History of Poland during the Piast dynasty

== Notes ==
a. "Though their names are now dispersed amid various clans and places, yet they are chiefly called Sclaveni and Antes" (Antes denoting the eastern early Slavic branch). Transl. by Charles Christopher Mierow, Princeton University Press 1908, from the University of Calgary web site.

b. Early Slavic peoples in Poland had their origins outside of Poland and arrived in Poland through migrations according to the allochthonic theory; according to the autochthonic theory the opposite is true, the Slavic or pre-Slavic peoples were present in Poland already in Antiquity or earlier

c. At about the time of the collapse of the Hun empire the Kyiv culture ends its existence and the Kolochin, Penkovka and Prague-Korchak cultures are already well-established, so the Slavic expansion and differentiation had to take place in part within the Hun dominated areas

d. This article reflects the contemporary point of view of the Polish and East European archaeologies. Many of the concepts presented were originally formulated by Kazimierz Godłowski of the Jagiellonian University. The idea of eastern origin of the Slavs was raised before him by J. Rozwadowski, K. Moszyński, H. Ułaszyn, H. Łowmiański (J. Wyrozumski – Historia Polski do roku 1505, p. 47, 63).

e. The Trzcinica site is being restored and developed as The Carpathian Troy Open-Air Archaeological Museum

f. The area is being developed as an outdoor replica of the settlement

g. Ibrahim ibn Yaqub wrote of four (Slavic) kings: The king of Bulgaria, Boleslaus the king of Prague, Bohemia and Kraków, Mieszko the king of the North, and Nako (of the Obotrites) the king of the West; Wyrozumski, p. 77

h. There is a minority opinion according to which Poland (or just southern Poland) was initially Christianized in the Slavic rite by followers of Cyril and Methodius and for a while the two branches coexisted in competition with each other. The arguments and speculations pointing in that direction were collected by Janusz Roszko in Pogański książę silny wielce (A pagan duke of great might), Iskry, Warszawa 1970
