= Przygodzice Radziwiłł Family Fee Tail =

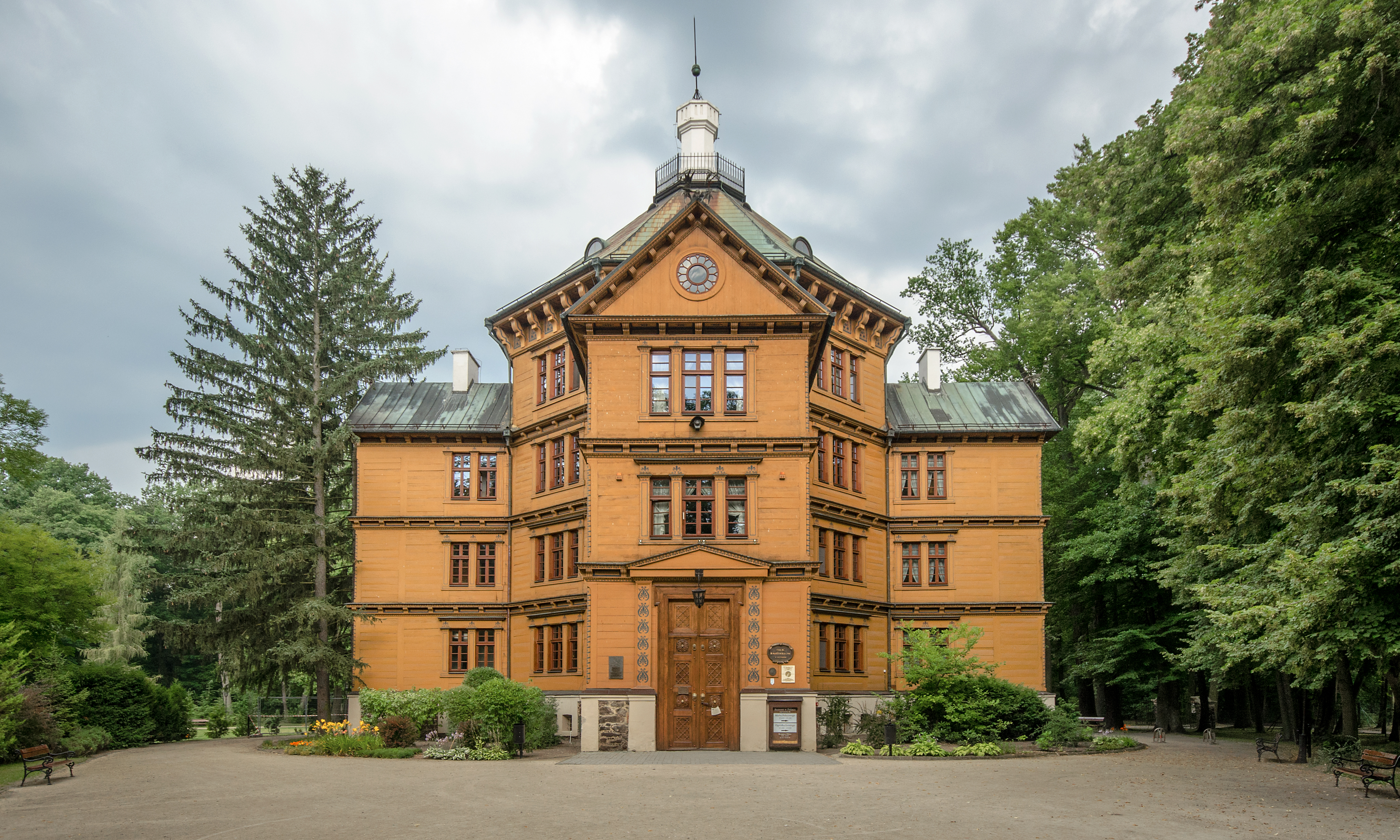
Hunting Palace in Antonin.

The Przygodzice Radziwiłł Family Fee Tail (Polish: Ordynacja Przygodzicka Radziwiłłów) was a fee tail established in the Prussian Partition of Poland by Prince Michał Hieronim Radziwiłł for his son Antoni Henryk Radziwiłł in 1873. It was owned by the Radziwiłł family until the end of World War II.

== Ortynats of the Estate ==
- Antoni Henryk Radziwiłł, I ordynat
- Bogusław Fryderyk Radziwiłł, II ordynat, son of the previous
- Ferdynand Radziwiłł, III ordynat, son of the previous
- Michał Radziwiłł Rudy, IV ordynat, son of the previous

== See also ==
- Radziwiłł Family Fee Tail
- Antonin, Gmina Przygodzice, Ostrów County, Greater Poland Voivodeship
- Przygodzice (Greater Poland)
