= Ziemowit =

Ziemowit, Siemowit
- Gender: male
- Language: Polish

Origin
- Origin: Slavic
- Meaning: siemo ("family") + wit ("to rule, ruler")

Other names
- Related names: Siemomysł

Ziemowit [ʑɛˈmɔvit] - is a Polish male given name of Slavic origin, a corrupted version of name Siemowit which is derived from words: "Siemo" - family and "wit" - ruler, to rule. The name may mean: "The head of the family". Nicknames: Ziemko, Ziemek.

== Notable bearers ==
- Siemowit, Ziemowit, one of the four legendary Piast princes of Poland
- Siemowit I of Masovia, a Duke of Czersk (1247–1248), Duke of Masovia (1248–1262) and Duke of Sieradz (1259–1260). He was a member of the House of Piast
- Siemowit III, Duke of Masovia, a prince of Masovia and a co-regent (with his brother Casimir I of Warsaw) of the lands of Warsaw, Czersk, Rawa, Gostynin and other parts of Masovia
- Siemowit IV, Duke of Masovia
- Siemowit of Cieszyn, a Polish prince, member of the Piast dynasty in the Cieszyn branch.
- Siemowit of Bytom, a Duke of Bytom during 1312-1316 and Duke of Gliwice since 1340 until his death

== Other bearers ==
- Ziemowit Pawluk, a former drummer of Polish streetpunk band The Analogs (1995-2003)
