= Siemowit =

Semi-legendary Polish Figure

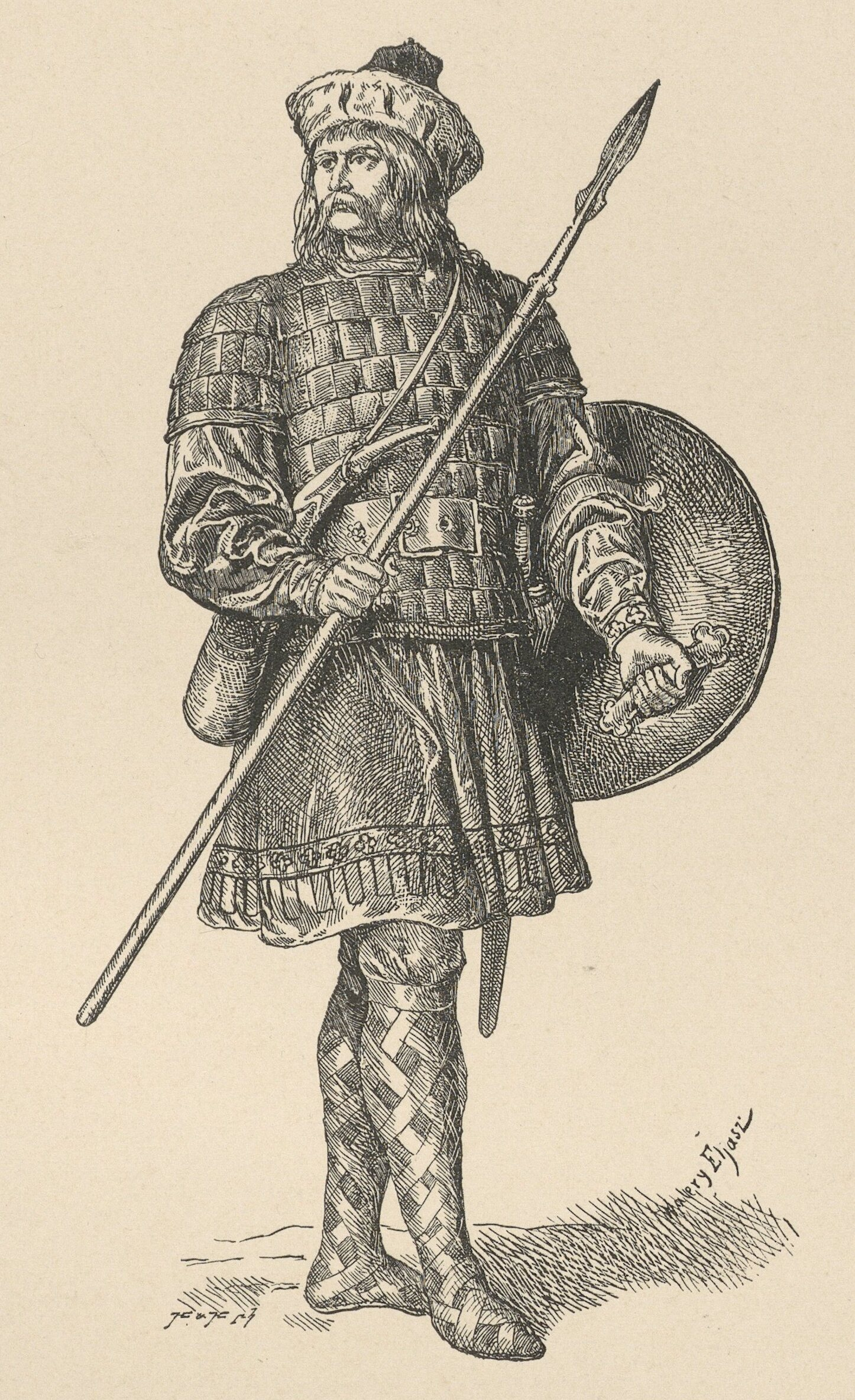

Duke of the Polans
- Reign: c. 861 – 900
- Predecessor: Piast the Wheelwright
- Successor: Lestek
- Born: c. 845
- Died: 900
- Issue: Lestek
- House: Piast
- Father: Piast the Wheelwright
- Mother: Rzepicha
- Religion: Slavic paganism

Siemowit (Polish pronunciation: [ɕɛˈmɔvit], also Ziemowit [ʑɛˈmɔvit]) was, according to the chronicles of Gallus Anonymus, the son of Piast the Wheelwright and Rzepicha. He is considered to be the first ruler of the Piast dynasty.

He became the Duke of the Polans in the 9th century after his father, Piast the Wheelwright, son of Chościsko, refused to take the place of legendary Duke Popiel. Siemowit was elected as new duke by the wiec. According to a popular legend, Popiel was then eaten by mice in his tower on Gopło lake.

The only mention of Siemowit, along with his son, Lestek, and grandson, Siemomysł, comes in the medieval chronicle of Gallus Anonymus.

Siemowit's great-grandson, Mieszko I, was the first Christian ruler of Poland.

== See also ==
- Poland in the Early Middle Ages
- Ziemowit (given name)
