= Radziwiłł Family Fee Tail =

Coat of Arms of the Radziwiłł family

Possessions of Radziwiłł family are marked in blue

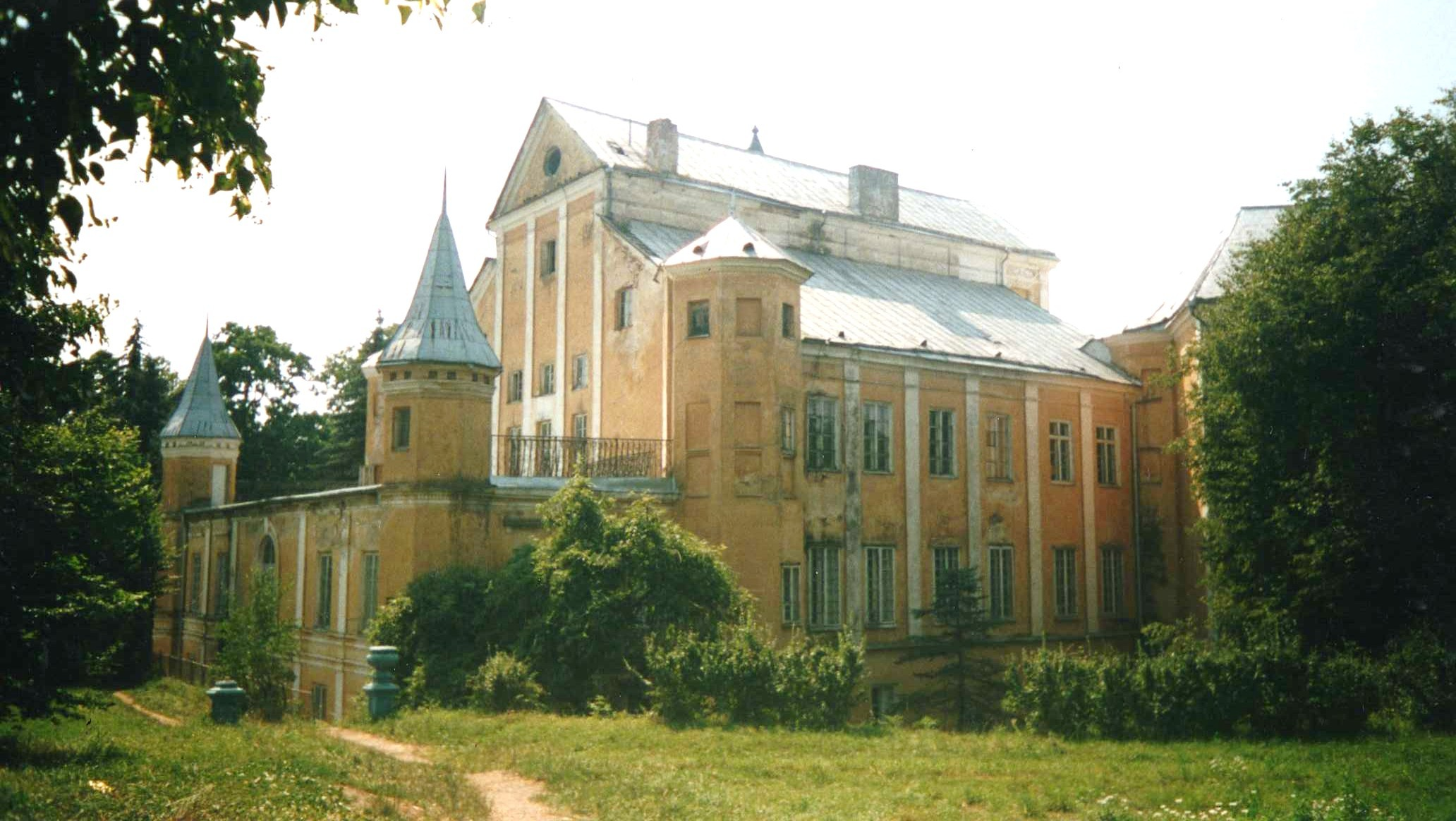
Castle in Nieśwież, residence of the ordynats of the "Nieśwież Fee Tail"

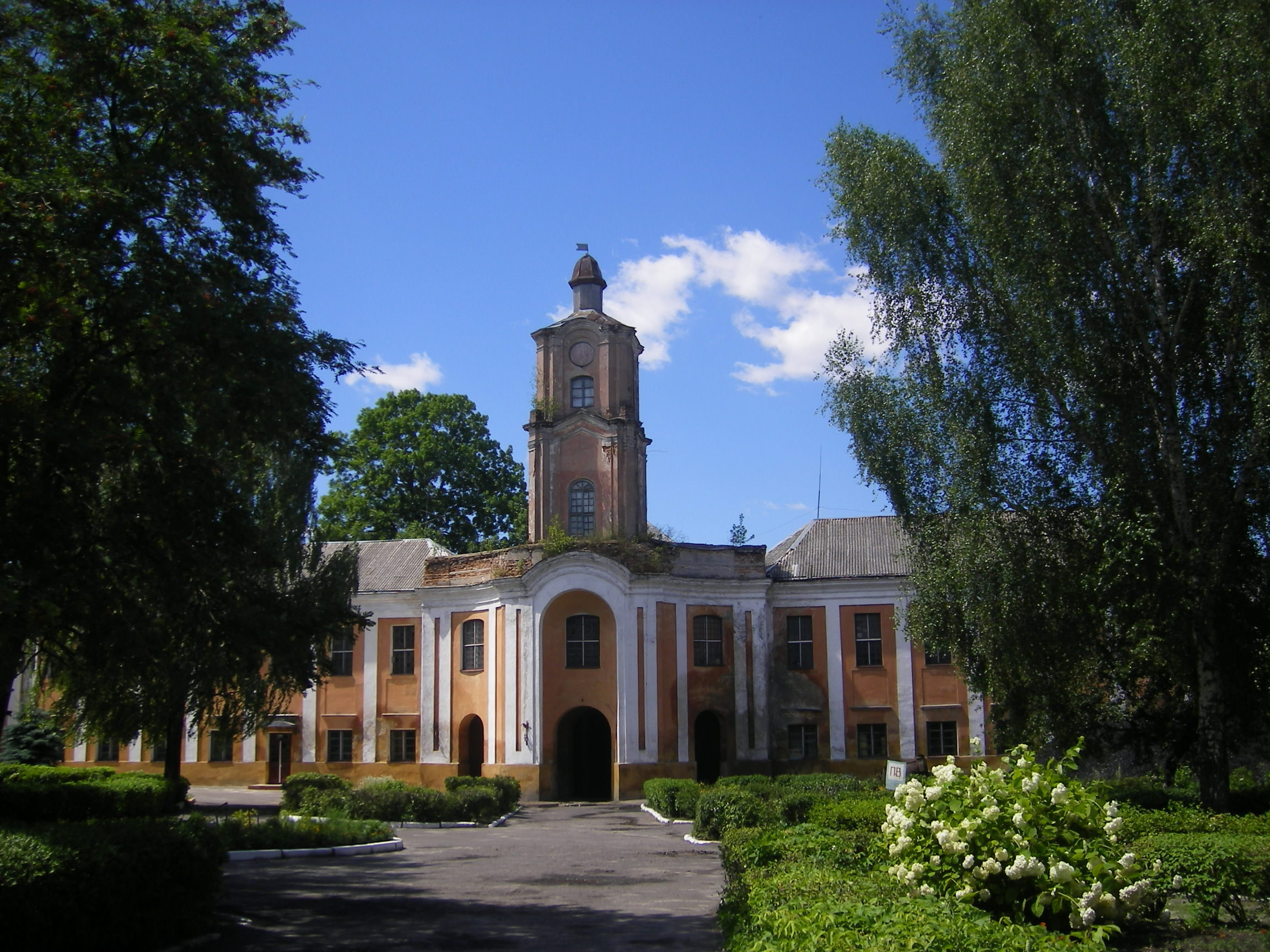
Castle in Ołyka

Radziwiłł Family Fee Tail (Polish: Ordynacja Radziwiłłów, Belarusian: Ардынацыя Радзівілаў) was a fee tail established in the Polish–Lithuanian Commonwealth and owned by the Radziwiłł family.

Three family fee tail estates were established on the basis of an agreement between the three sons of Mikołaj Czarny Radziwiłł on August 16, 1586 in Grodno. The "Nyasvizh Fee Tail" (Ordynacja Nieświeska, Нясвіжская ардынацыя), "Ołyka Fee Tail" (Ordynacja Ołycka) and "Kleck Fee Tail" (Ordynacja Klecka, Клецкая ардынацыя). It was approved by the Sejm in 1589. Ordynat was the title of the principal heir of the Ordynacja.

The family fee tail existed in partitioned Poland and the Second Republic of Poland until the end of World War II. The last ordynat was Prince Leon Władysław Radziwiłł (1888-1956).

== Ortynats of the Estate ==
=== Nyasvizh Fee Tail (Ordynacja Nieświeska) ===
- Mikołaj Krzysztof "Sierotka" Radziwiłł, I ordynat
- Jan Jerzy Radziwiłł, II ordynat, son of the previous
- Albrecht Władysław Radziwiłł, III ordynat, son of the previous
- Zygmunt Karol Radziwiłł, IV ordynat, brother of the previous
- Aleksander Ludwik Radziwiłł, V ordynat, brother of the previous
- Michał Kazimierz Radziwiłł, VI ordynat, son of the previous
- Jerzy Józef Radziwiłł, VII ordynat, son of the previous
- Karol Stanisław Radziwiłł, VIII ordynat, brother of the previous
- Michał Kazimierz "Rybeńko" Radziwiłł, IX ordynat, son of the previous
- Karol Stanisław "Panie Kochanku" Radziwiłł, X ordynat, son of the previous
- Dominik Hieronim Radziwiłł, XI ordynat, nephew of the previous
- Antoni Henryk Radziwiłł, XII ordynat, distant cousin
- Wilhelm Radziwiłł, XIII ordynat, son of the previous
- Antoni Wilhelm Radziwiłł, XIV ordynat, son of the previous
- Jerzy Fryderyk Radziwiłł, XV ordynat, son of the previous
- Albrecht Antoni Wilhelm Radziwiłł, XVI ordynat, son of the previous
- Leon Władysław Radziwiłł, XVII ordynat, brother of the previous, the last ordynat

=== Kleck Fee Tail (Ordynacja Klecka) ===
- Albrecht Radziwiłł, I ordynat
- Jan Albrycht Radziwiłł, II ordynat, son of the previous
- Jan Władysław Radziwiłł, III ordynat, son of the previous
- Michał Karol Radziwiłł, IV ordynat, son of the previous
- Stanisław Kazimierz Radziwiłł, V ordynat, son of the previous
- Dominik Mikołaj Radziwiłł VI ordynat, distant cousin
- Jan Mikołaj Radziwiłł, VII ordynat, son of the previous
- Marcin Mikołaj Radziwiłł, VIII ordynat, son of the previous
- Józef Mikołaj Radziwiłł, IX ordynat, son of the previous
- Michał Hieronim Radziwiłł, X ordynat, son of the previous
- Ludwik Mikołaj Radziwiłł, XI ordynat, son of the previous
- Leon Radziwiłł, XII ordynat, son of the previous
- Jerzy Fryderyk Radziwiłł, XIII ordynat, cousin of the previous
- Albrecht Antoni Wilhelm Radziwiłł, XIV ordynat, son of the previous
- Leon Władysław Radziwiłł, XV ordynat, brother of the previous

=== Ołyka Fee Tail (Ordynacja Ołycka) ===
- Stanisław Radziwiłł, I ordynat
- Mikołaj Krzysztof Radziwiłł, II ordynat, son of the previous
- Albrecht Stanisław Radziwiłł, III ordynat, brother of the previous
- Michał Kazimierz Radziwiłł, IV ordynat, cousin of the previous
- Michał Kazimierz "Rybeńko" Radziwiłł, VII ordynat, son of the previous
- Karol Stanisław "Panie Kochanku" Radziwiłł, VIII ordynat, son of the previous
- Dominik Hieronim Radziwiłł, IX ordynat, nephew of the previous
- Antoni Henryk Radziwiłł, X ordynat, distant cousin
- Bogusław Fryderyk Radziwiłł, XI ordynat, son of the previous
- Ferdynand Radziwiłł, XII ordynat, son of the previous
- Janusz Franciszek Radziwiłł, XIII ordynat, son of the previous
- Edmund Ferdynand Radziwiłł, XIV ordynat, third son of the previous

== See also ==
- Fee tail in the Polish–Lithuanian Commonwealth
- Przygodzice Radziwiłł Family Fee Tail
- Zamoyski Family Fee Tail

== Bibliography ==
- T. Zielińska Ordynacje w dawnej Polsce, „Przegląd Historyczny” 1977 z. 1.
