= Chościsko =

Semi-legendary Polish Figure

- Predecessor: Popiel II
- Successor: Piast the Wheelwright
- Born: Unknown

Chościsko (Polish pronunciation: [xɔɕˈtɕiskɔ]) is a legendary figure in Polish prehistory, father of Piast the Wheelwright, the founder of the Piast dynasty. His name occurs in the first Polish chronicle, Cronicae et gesta ducum sive principum Polonorum by Gallus Anonymus, where the author refers three times to Piast as the son of Chościsko.

Chościsko's name is probably derived from a simplified pronunciation of the word Hastingsko derived from the term Hasding (meaning long-haired) which was difficult to pronounce in Old Slavonic. The other analysis suggests that Chościsko's name is probably derived from chost or chwost meaning tail in Old Slavic.

== See also ==
- Poland in the Early Middle Ages
