= Piast the Wheelwright =

Semi-legendary Polish figure

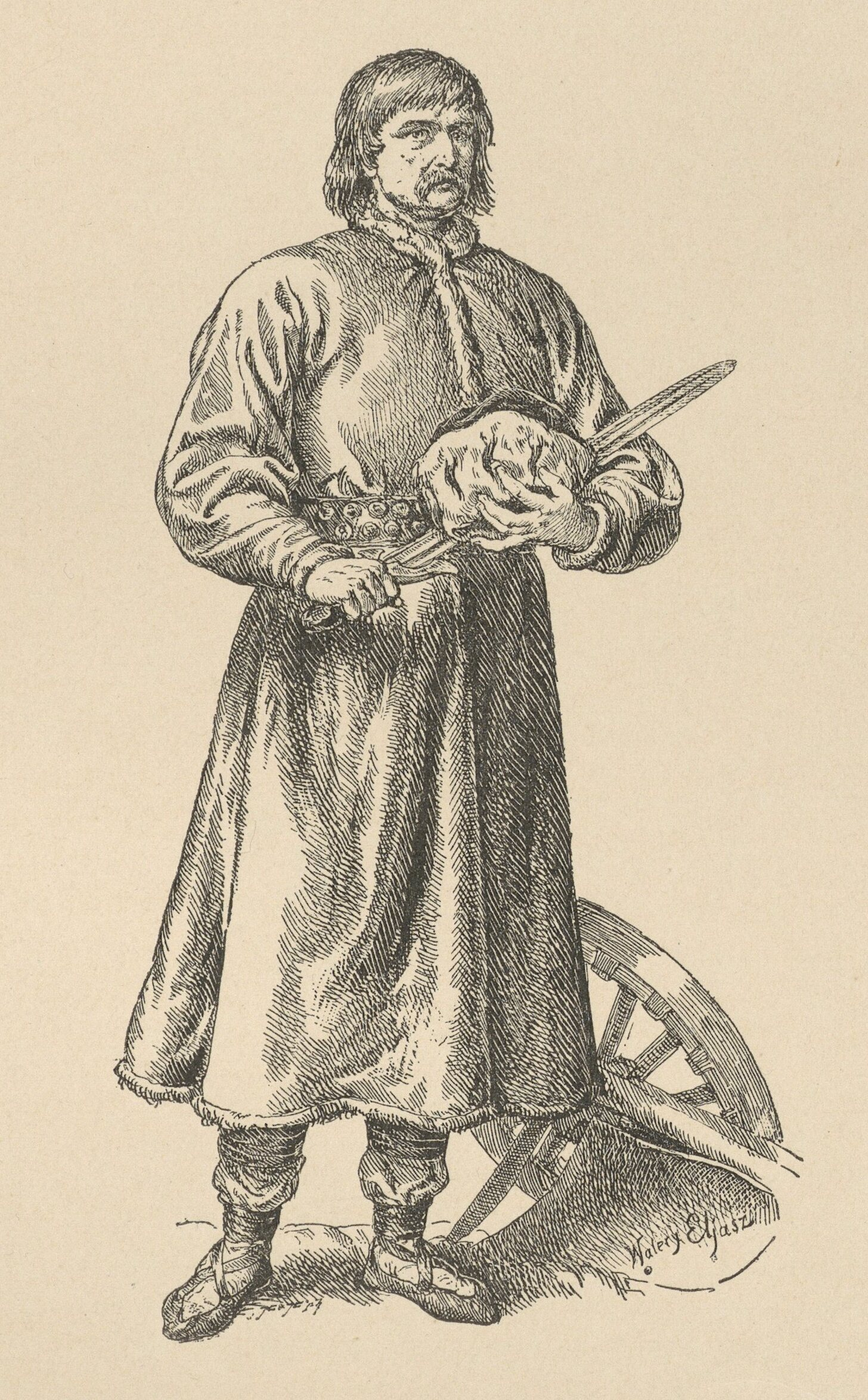
- Portrait of Piast the Wheelwright

Duke of the Polans
- Predecessor: Chościsko
- Successor: Siemowit
- Born: 740/741?
- Died: 861? (claimed age 120)
- Spouse: Rzepicha
- Issue: Siemowit
- House: Piast (founder)
- Father: Chościsko
- Religion: Slavic paganism

Piast the Wheelwright (c. 740/741? – 861?, Polish: Piast Kołodziej [ˈpʲast kɔˈwɔd͡ʑɛj], Piast Oracz, i.e. Piast the Plower, or Piast; Piast Chościskowic, Latin: Past Ckosisconis, Pazt filius Chosisconisu) was a legendary figure in medieval Poland (9th century), the progenitor of the Piast dynasty that ruled the Kingdom of Poland.

== Legend ==
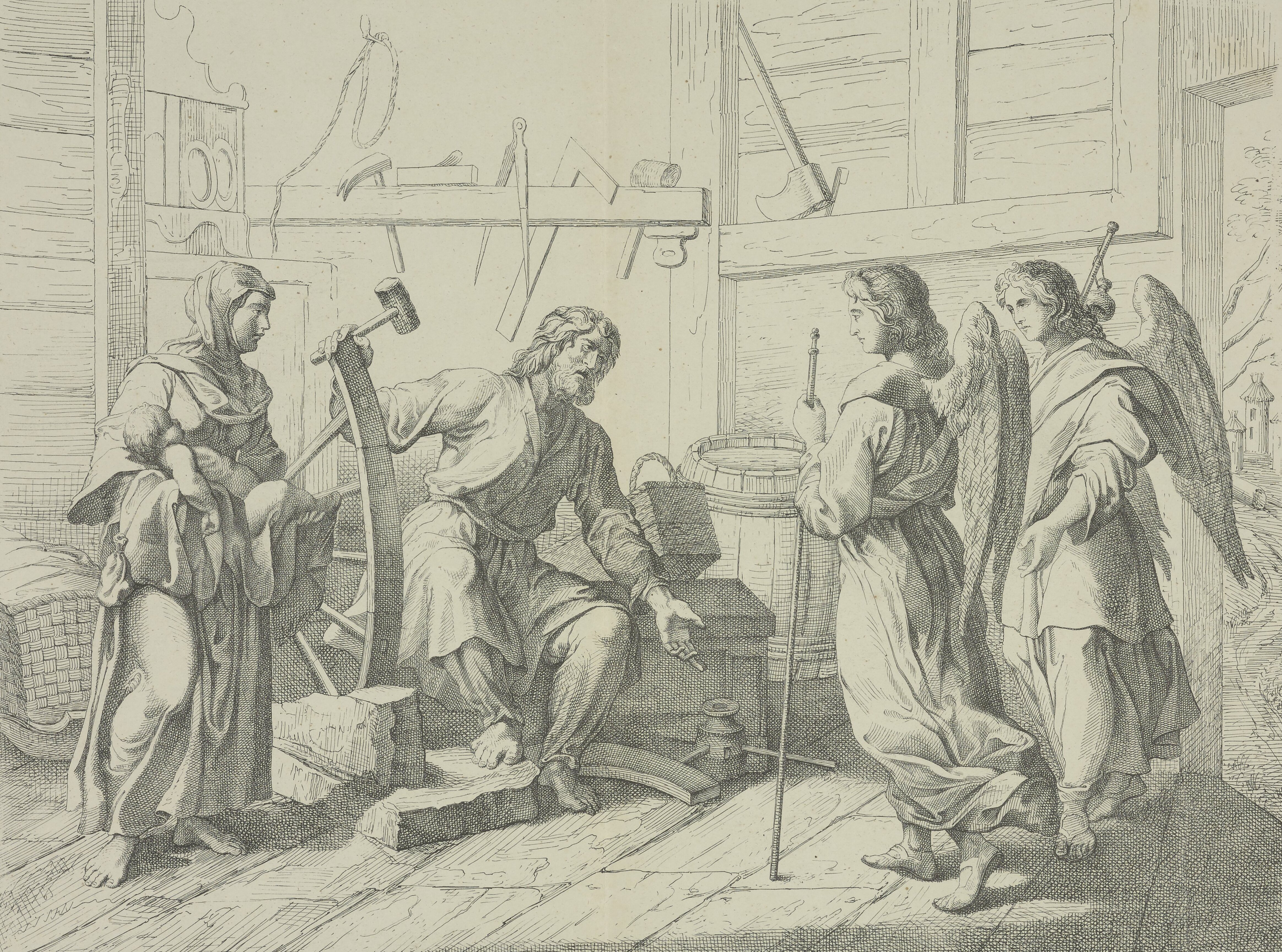
The angels visit the home of Piast the Wheelwright (lithograph, c. 1860)

Piast makes an appearance in the Polish Chronicle of Gallus Anonymus, along with his father, Chościsko, and Piast's wife, Rzepicha.

The chronicle tells the story of an unexpected visit paid to Piast by two strangers. They ask to join Piast's family in celebration of the 7th birthday (a pagan rite of passage for young boys) of Piast's son, Siemowit. In return for the hospitality, the guests cast a spell making Piast's cellar ever full of plenty. Seeing this, Piast's compatriots declared him their new prince, to replace the late Prince Popiel.

If Piast really existed, he would have been the great-great-grandfather of Prince Mieszko I (c. 930–992), the first historic ruler of Poland, and the great-great-great-grandfather of Bolesław I the Brave (967–1025), the first Polish king.

The legendary Piasts were natives of Gniezno, a well-fortified castle town founded between the eighth and ninth century, within the tribal territory of the Polans.

According to legend, he died in 861 at the age of 120 years.

== Legacy ==
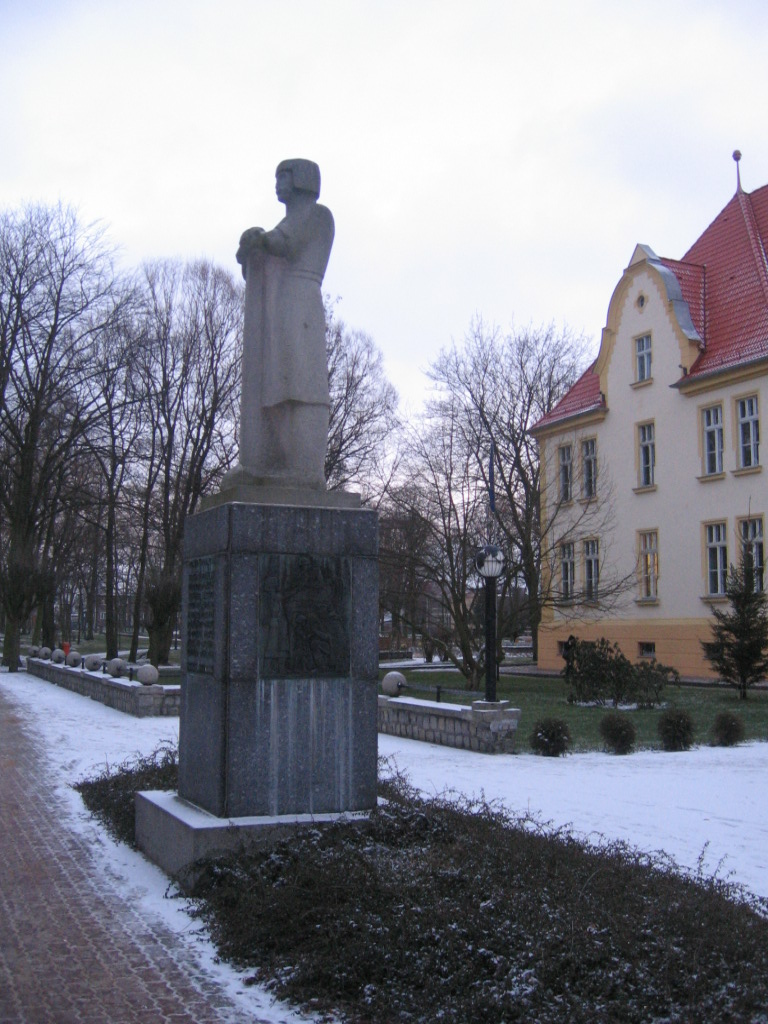
Monument to Piast Kołodziej in Złotów

Across more than the next thousand years, no figure in Polish history was named Piast.

Two theories explain the etymology of the word Piast. The first gives the root as piasta ("[wheel] hub" in Polish), a reference to his profession. The second relates Piast to piastun ("custodian" or "keeper"). This could hint at Piast's initial position as a majordomo, a "steward of the house", in the court of another ruler, and the subsequent takeover of power by Piast. This would parallel the development of the early medieval Frankish dynasties, when the Mayors of the Palace of the Merovingian kings gradually usurped political control.
