= Rzepicha =

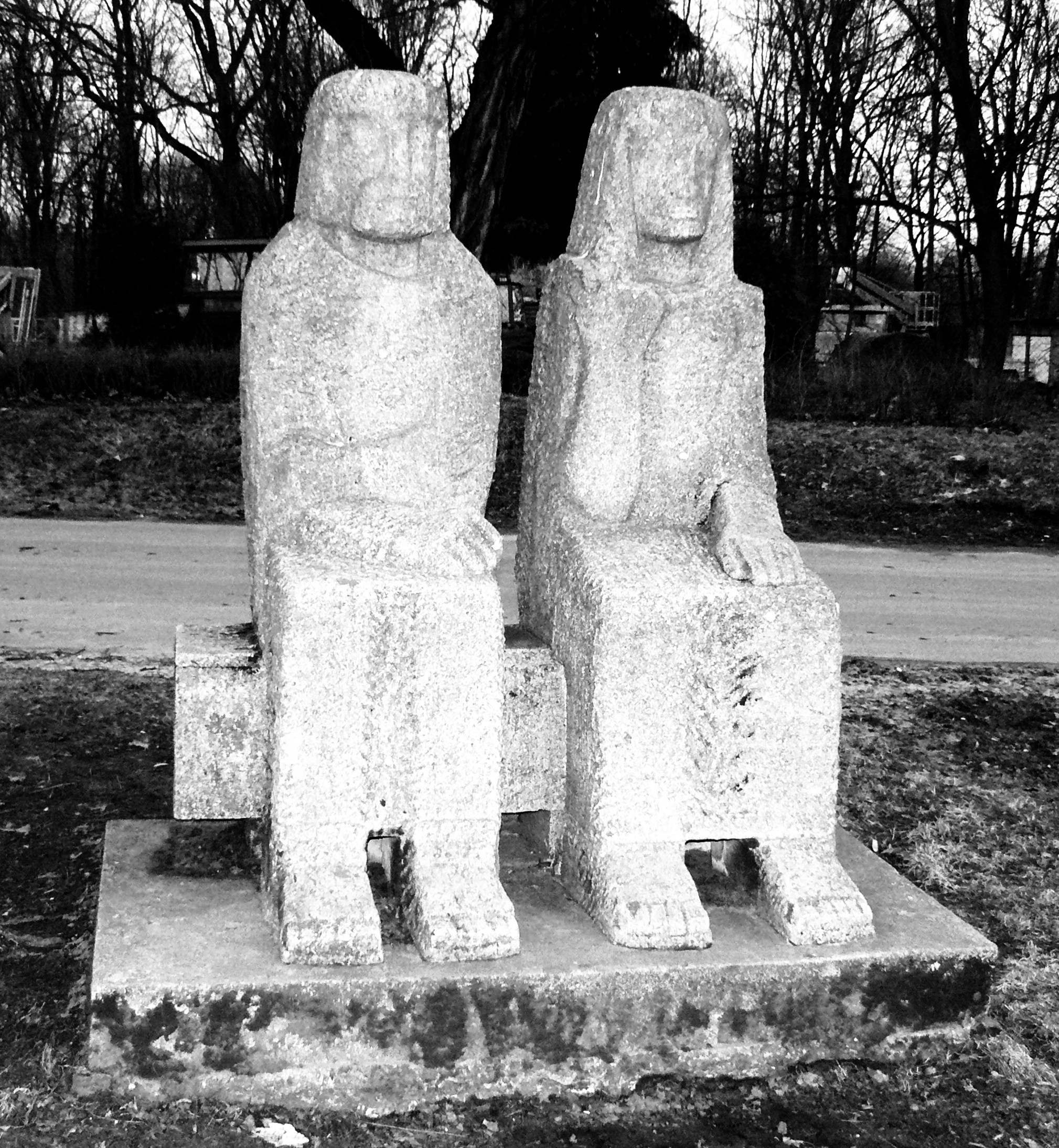
Piast and Rzepicha (Polish rulers) in Poznań (by Czesław Woźniak).

Rzepicha (pronounced [ʐɛˈpixa]) (also Rzepka) was the wife of the semi-legendary Piast the Wheelwright (founder of the Piast dynasty) and the mother of Siemowit. She is mentioned in Gallus Anonymus' Polish Chronicle (Cronicae et gesta ducum sive principum Polonorum), where her name is explicitly referred to twice.

== Biography ==
According to Gallus Anonymus, she lived in the 9th century. Her ancestors are unknown. In the story described in the chronicle she keeps a house together with Piast and hospitably entertains two guests who came to Piast to celebrate their son's first haircut.
