= Mazowiecka Street (Kraków) =

Street in Kraków, Poland

Mazowiecka street
Kraków
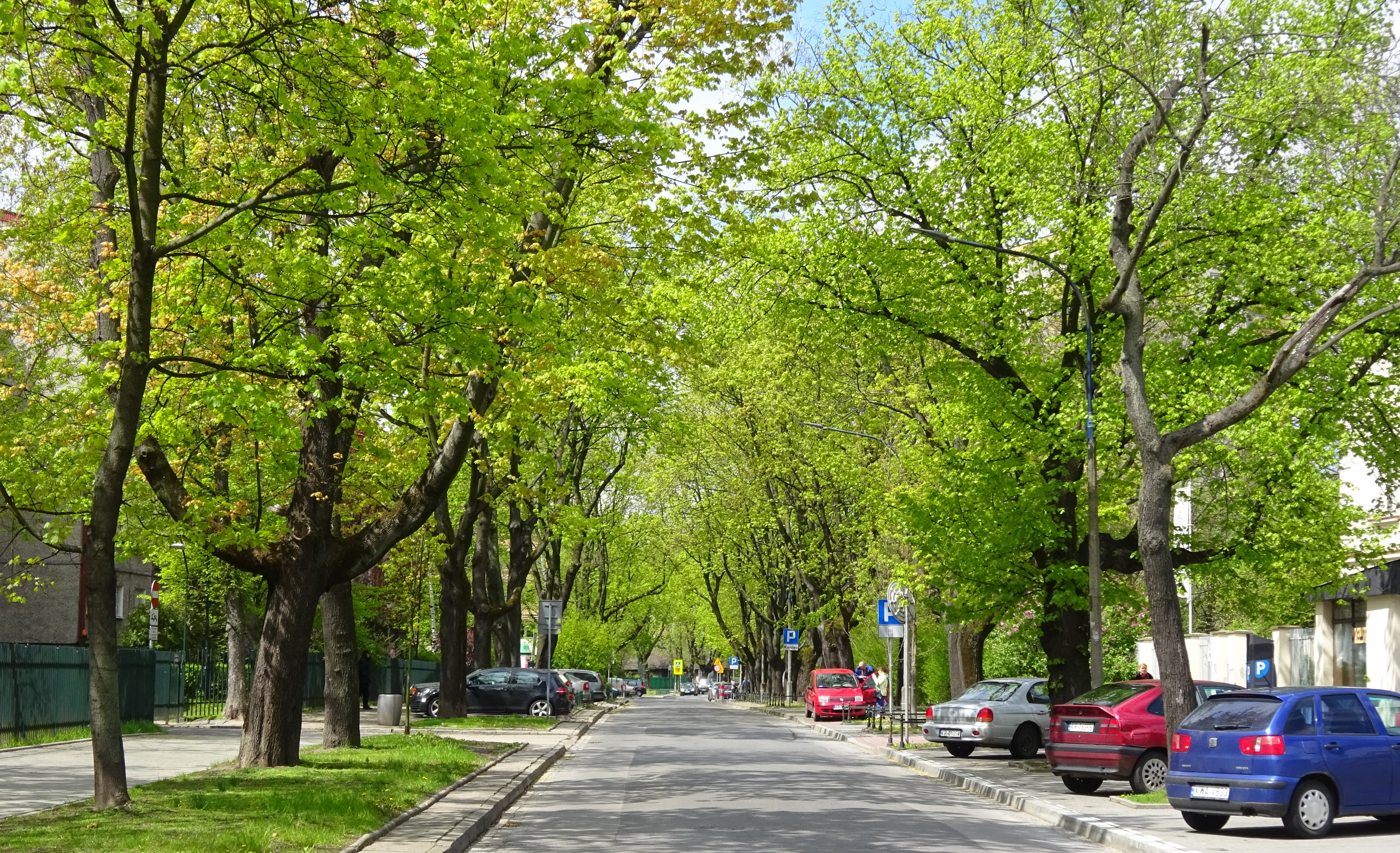
- View from the intersection with Wójtowska Street towards the west (2017)
- Interactive map of Mazowiecka street
- Part of: Kraków Krowodrza district
- Owner: City of Kraków
- Location: Kraków, Poland

Mazowiecka Street is a street in Kraków, in district Krowodrza. It is an extension of Krowoderska Street, running from the intersection with Juliusz Słowacki Avenue to the exit at Kijowska Avenue.

== History ==
For the first time on city maps from the 18th century, it was depicted as an unnamed street leading toward the settlements of Krowodrza and Łobzów. At the beginning of the 20th century, it was referred to as the "Road to Łobzów," and a few decades later, it was called Krowoderska Street (in modern times, it is its extension). In 1912, the street received its current name, derived from the historical name of the Polish region – Mazovia.

== Buildings ==
The following are buildings on Moazowiecka Street.

=== Public administration buildings ===
1. 21 Mazowiecka Street – District Labor Office of Kraków
2. Kraków Łobzów Police Station (Formerly Mazowiecka Street 112, currently moved to Walery Eljasz-Radzikowski Street 29)

=== Cultural and educational institutions ===
1. 43 Mazowiecka Street – Faculty of Art at the Pedagogical University of Kraków
2. 70 Mazowiecka Street – Primary School No. 36
3. 30A Mazowiecka Street – Municipal Nursery No. 18
4. 45 Mazowiecka Street – Municipal Kindergarten No. 43

=== Private Institutions ===
1. 25 Mazowiecka Street – Kraków Engineering Works Company
2. 4–6 Mazowiecka Street – NZOZ Falck Medycyna with an emergency ambulance team

=== Tenement houses ===
- 3a Mazowiecka Street – Tenement house, circa 1935.
- 5a Mazowiecka Street – Tenement house, designed by Zygmunt Grünberg, 1938.
- 7 Mazowiecka Street – Tenement house, designed by Stanisław Osiek, 1937.
- 8 Mazowiecka Street – Tenement house, designed by Zbigniew Odrzywolski, 1929.
- 9 Mazowiecka Street – Tenement house, circa 1920.
- 11 Mazowiecka Street – Tenement house, designed by Ignacy Bierer, 1935.
- 15 Mazowiecka Street (1 Lubelska Street) – Tenement house, circa 1914.
- 26a Mazowiecka Street – Tenement house, designed by Izydor Goldberger, 1936.
- 26b Mazowiecka Street – Tenement house, designed by Izydor Goldberger, 1936.
- 28a Mazowiecka Street – Tenement house, designed by Izydor Goldberger, 1936.
- 28b Mazowiecka Street – Tenement house, designed by Izydor Goldberger, 1936.
- 29 Mazowiecka Street – Tenement house, designed by Aleksander Biborski, 1914.
- 33 Mazowiecka Street – Tenement house, circa 1910.
- 37 Mazowiecka Street – Tenement house, 1928.
- 43 Mazowiecka Street – Tenement house, circa 1910.
- 50 Mazowiecka Street – Tenement house, designed by A. Jakóbek, 1910.
- 64 Mazowiecka Street – Tenement house, 1912.
- 113 Mazowiecka Street (40 Racławicka Street) – Tenement house, 1911.
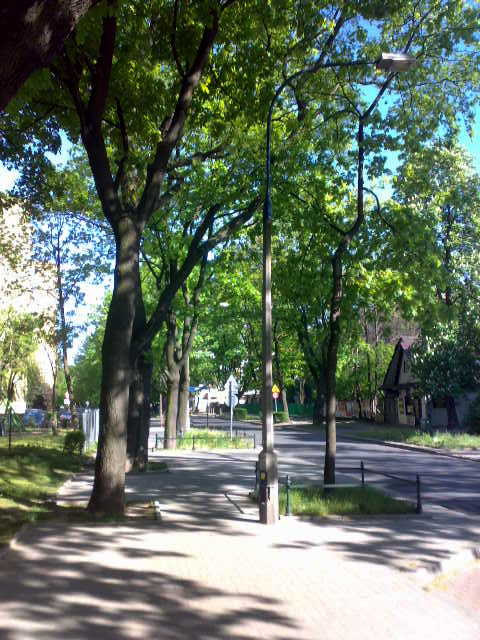
The intersection of Mazowiecka Street and Kmieca Street

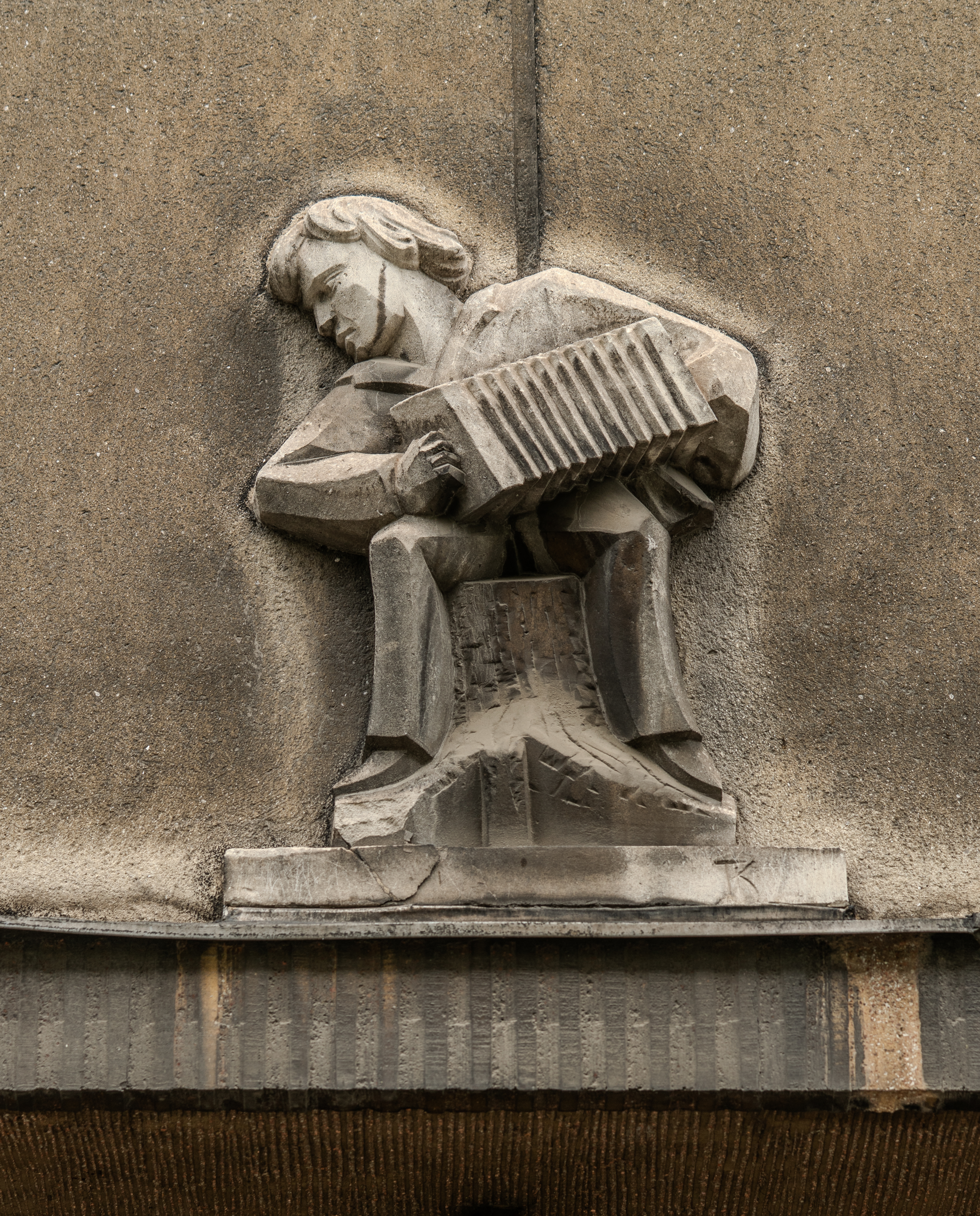
7 Mazowiecka Street, emblem on the facade of the tenement house

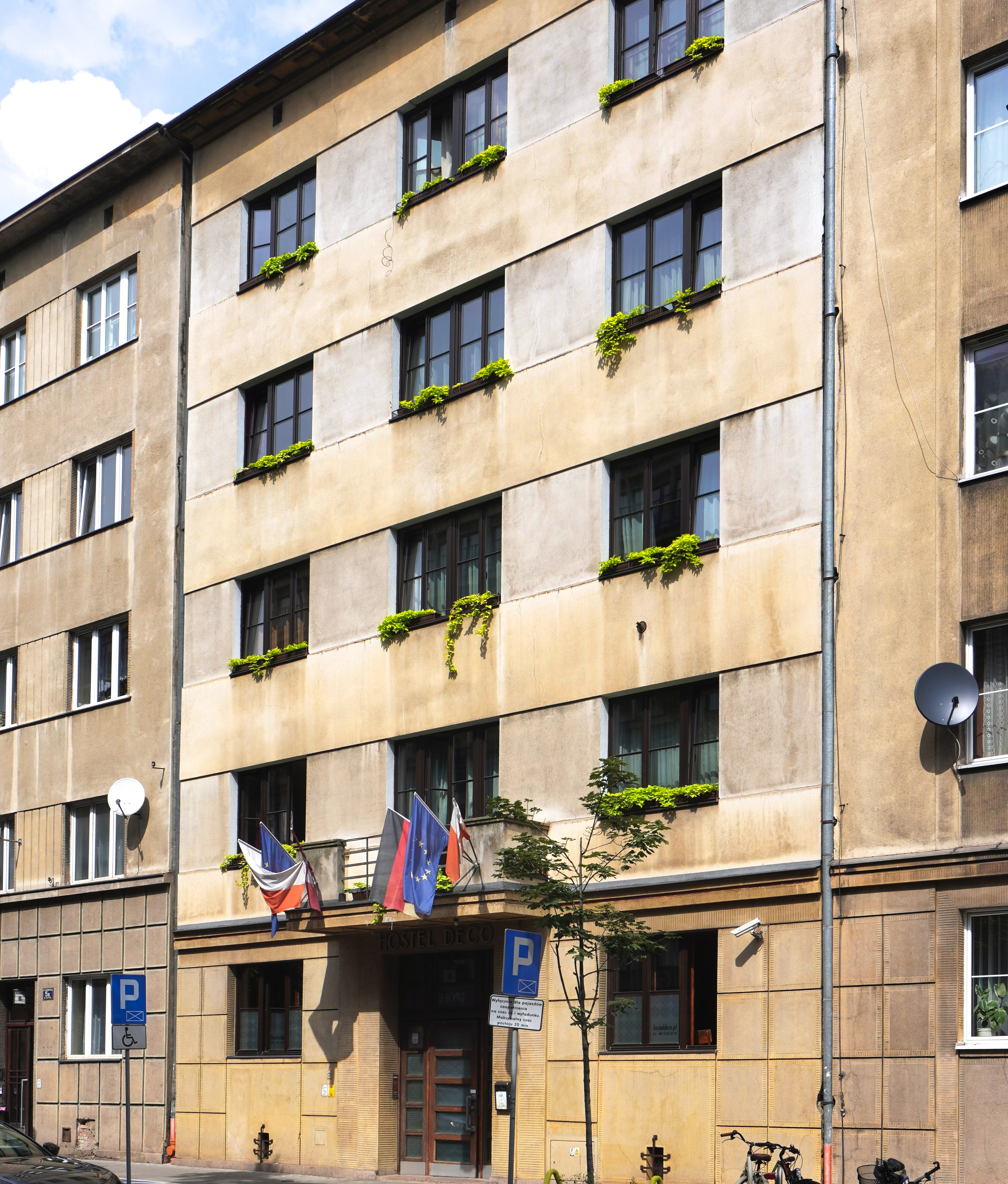
3A Mazowiecka Street
Tenement house (1935)

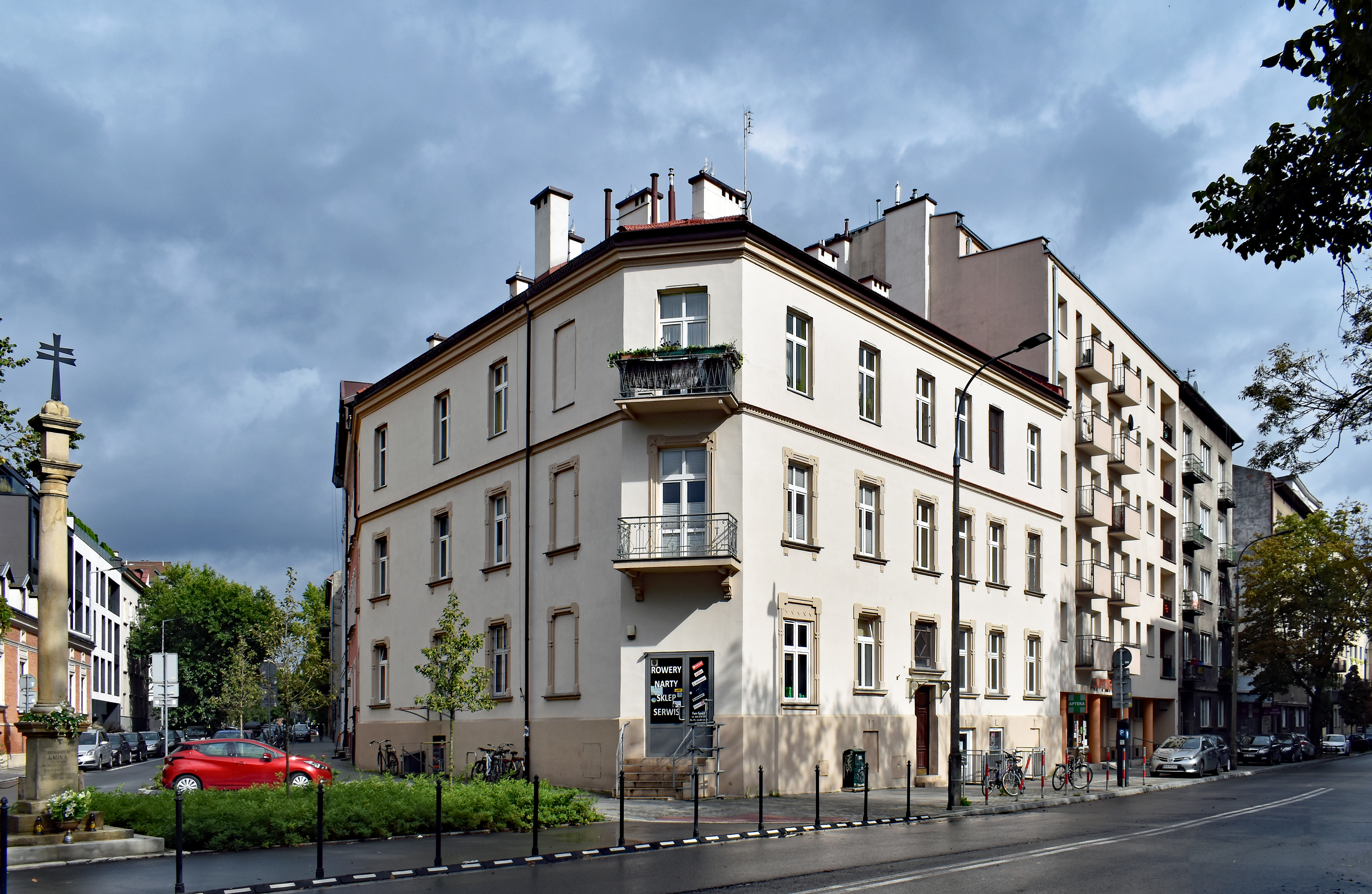
15 Mazowiecka Street (1 Lubelska Street)
Tenement house (1914)

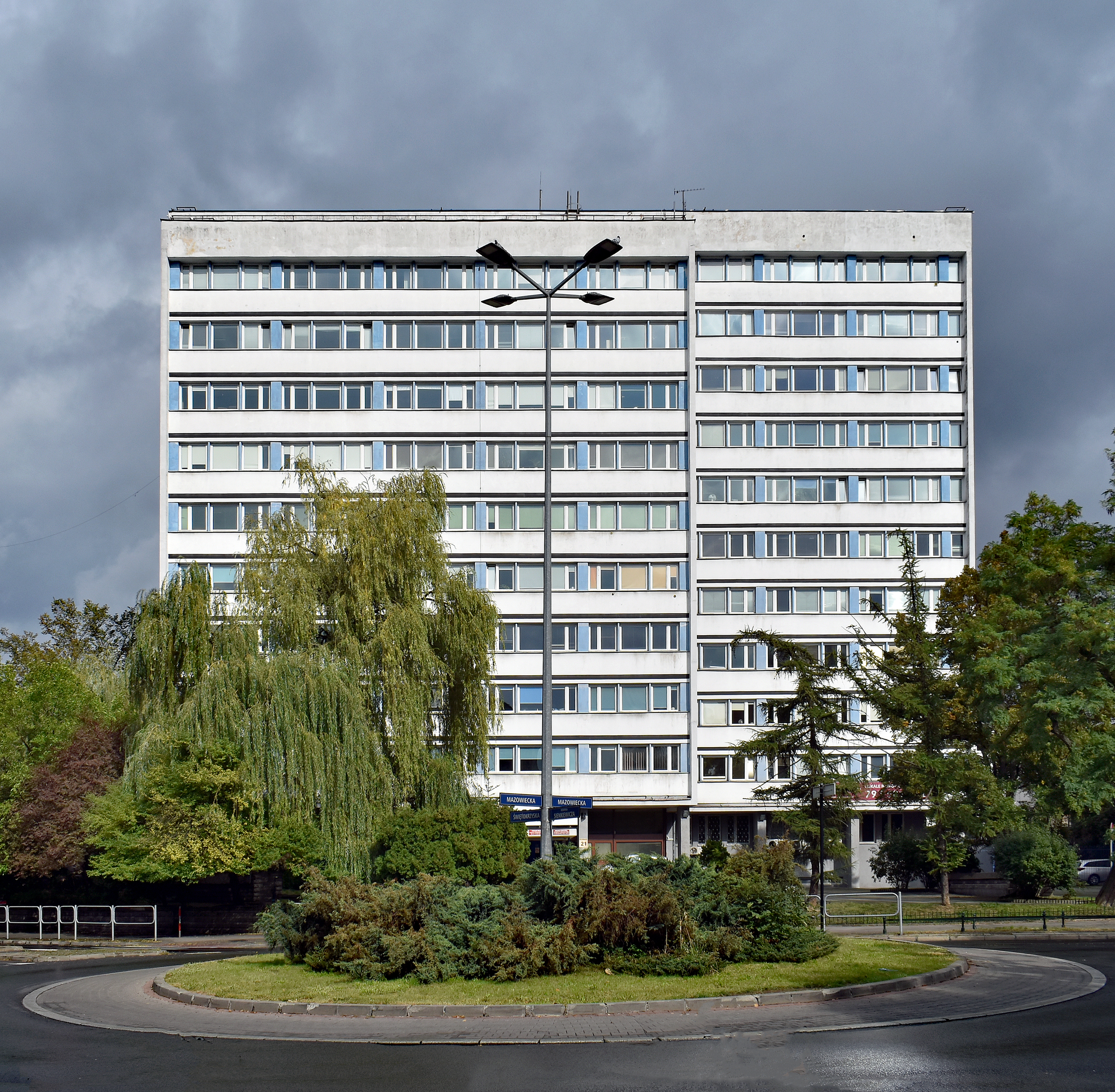
21 Mazowiecka Street
The former office building of "Energoprojekt Kraków" (1968 design. Antoni Mazur)

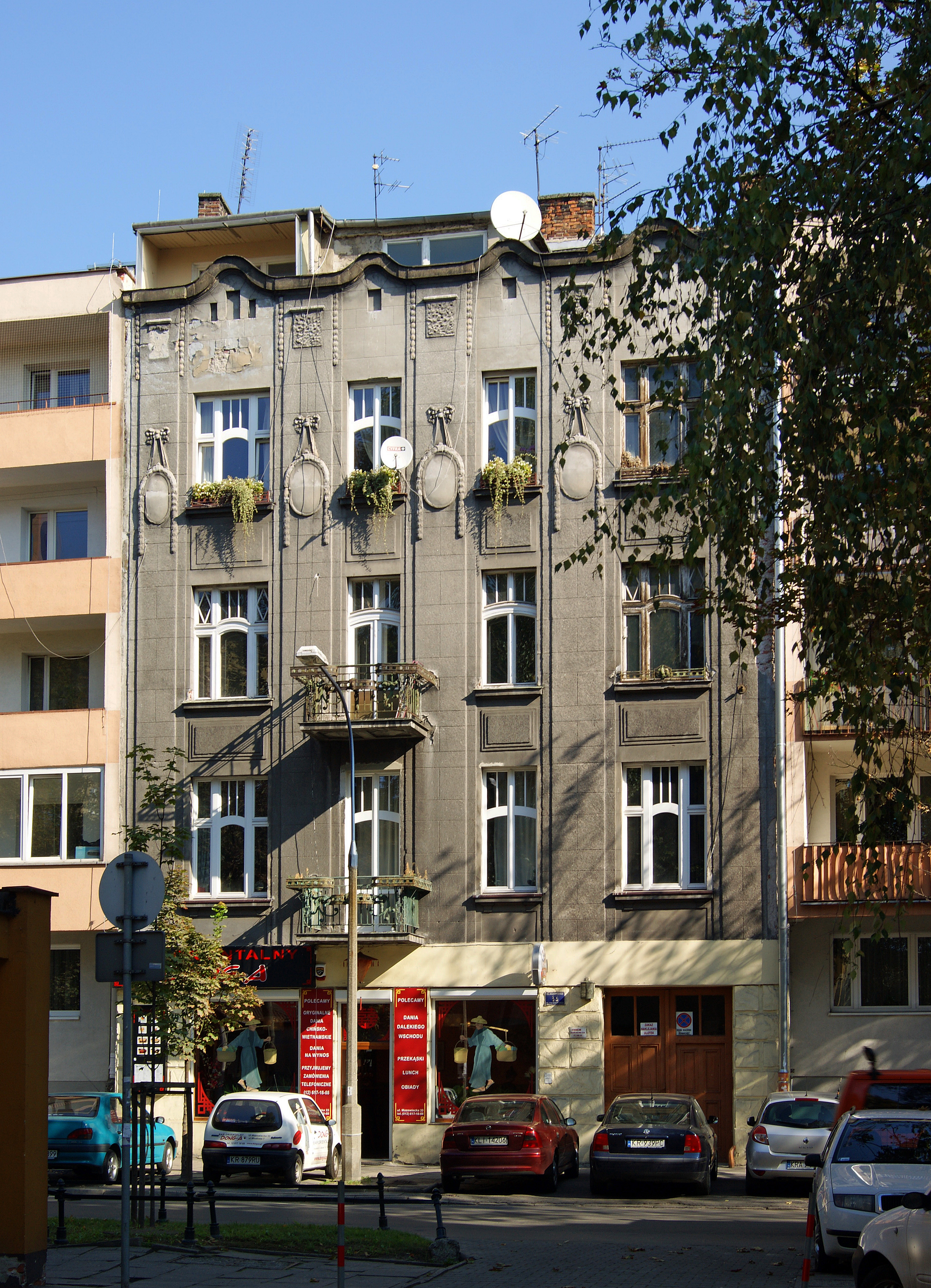
33 Mazowiecka Street
Tenement house (1910)

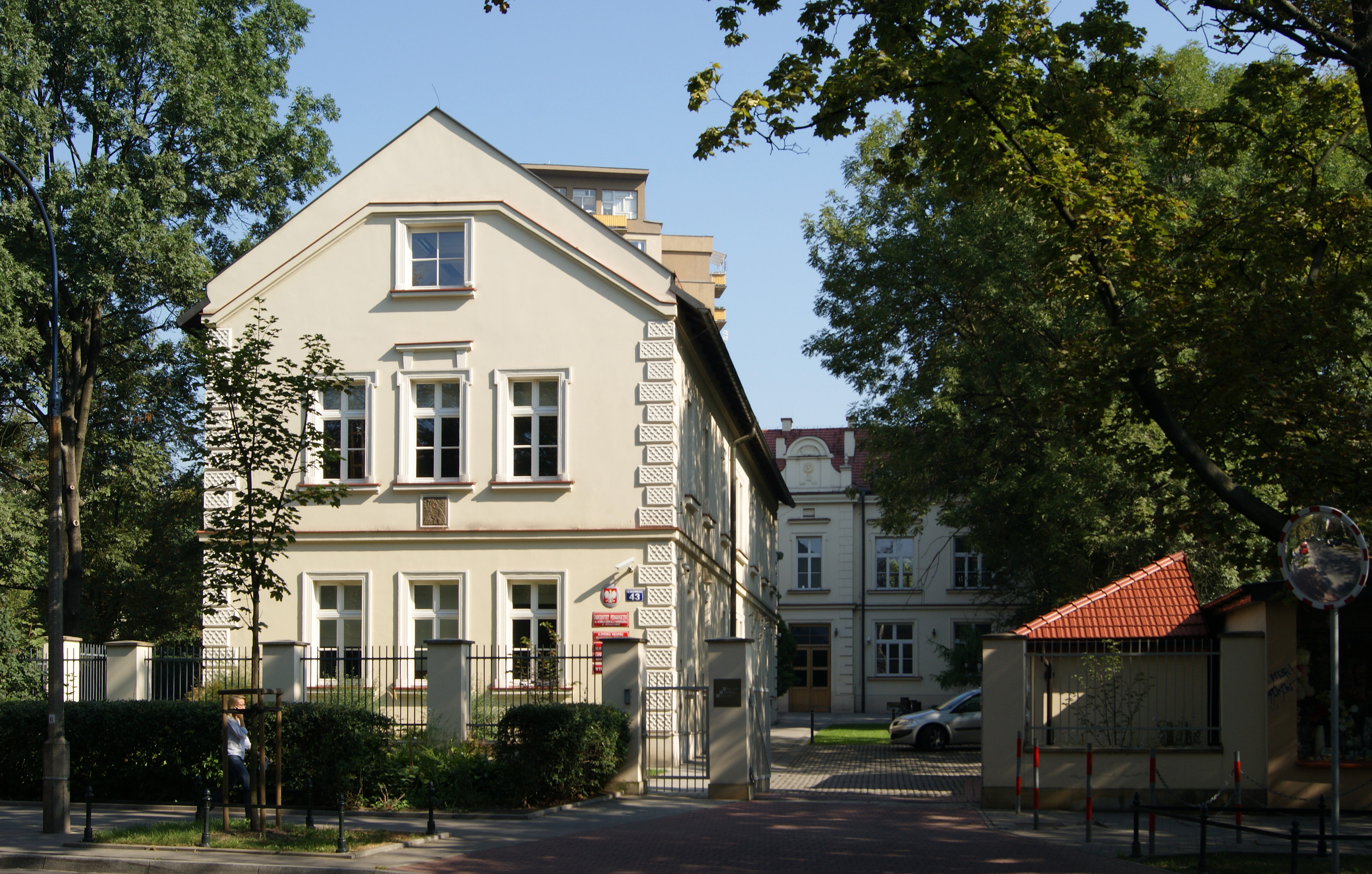
43 Mazowiecka Street
Institute of Painting and Artistic Education Pedagogical University of Kraków
