= Statue of Wojtek the Bear (Kraków) =

Sculpture in Kraków, Poland

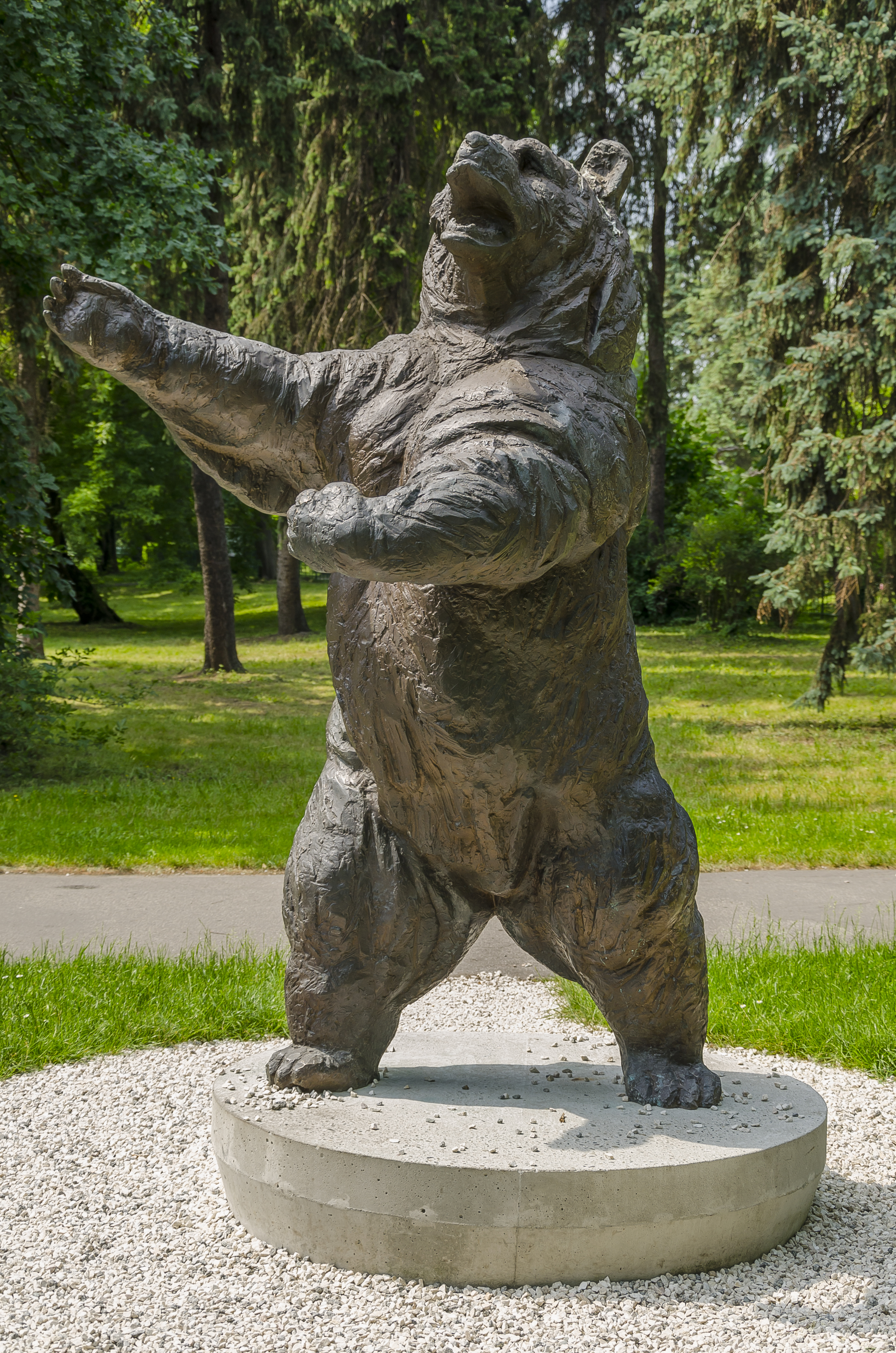
- The statue in 2015.
- Interactive map of Statue of Wojtek the Bear
- Location: Henry Jordan Park, Krowodrza, Kraków, Poland
- Coordinates: 53.449679°N 14.482209°E
- Designer: Wojciech Batko
- Type: Statue
- Material: Bronze
- Height: 2.3 m (7 ft 7 in)
- Opening date: 18 May 2015
- Dedicated to: Wojtek

The statue of Wojtek the Bear (Polish: Pomnik niedźwiedzia Wojtka) is a bronze sculpture in Kraków, Poland, placed in the Henry Jordan Park, within the Krowodrza district. It is dedicated to Wojtek (1942–1963), a Syrian brown bear which accompanied the 2nd Polish Corps during Second World War, most notably serving darting the battle of Monte Cassino. The monument was designed by Wojciech Batko, and unveiled on 18 May 2015.

== History ==
The monument was designed by Wojciech Batko, and unveiled on 18 May 2015, on the 70th anniversary of the capture of Monte Cassino by the 2nd Polish Corps during Second World War. The monument was funded by the Henry Jordan Park Association. It cost 60,000 Polish zloties, which were donated by the residents.

== Design ==
The bronze statue depicts Syrian brown bear Wojtek, standing with his legs wide, roaring, and waving his front legs. It is placed in the Henry Jordan Park, on a corner of two pathways, of which one leads to a children's playground, and another to the avenue decorated with series of bust sculptures dedicated to important historical Polish figures. With his paw, the bear points in the direct of the bust of Władysław Anders, the commander of the 2nd Polish Corps, in which Wojtek served. The statue has the height of 2.3 m.
