= Miasteczko Studenckie AGH =

Student campus of AGH University of Krakow

Coordinates: 50°04′06″N 19°54′21″E

- AGH University of Science and Technology
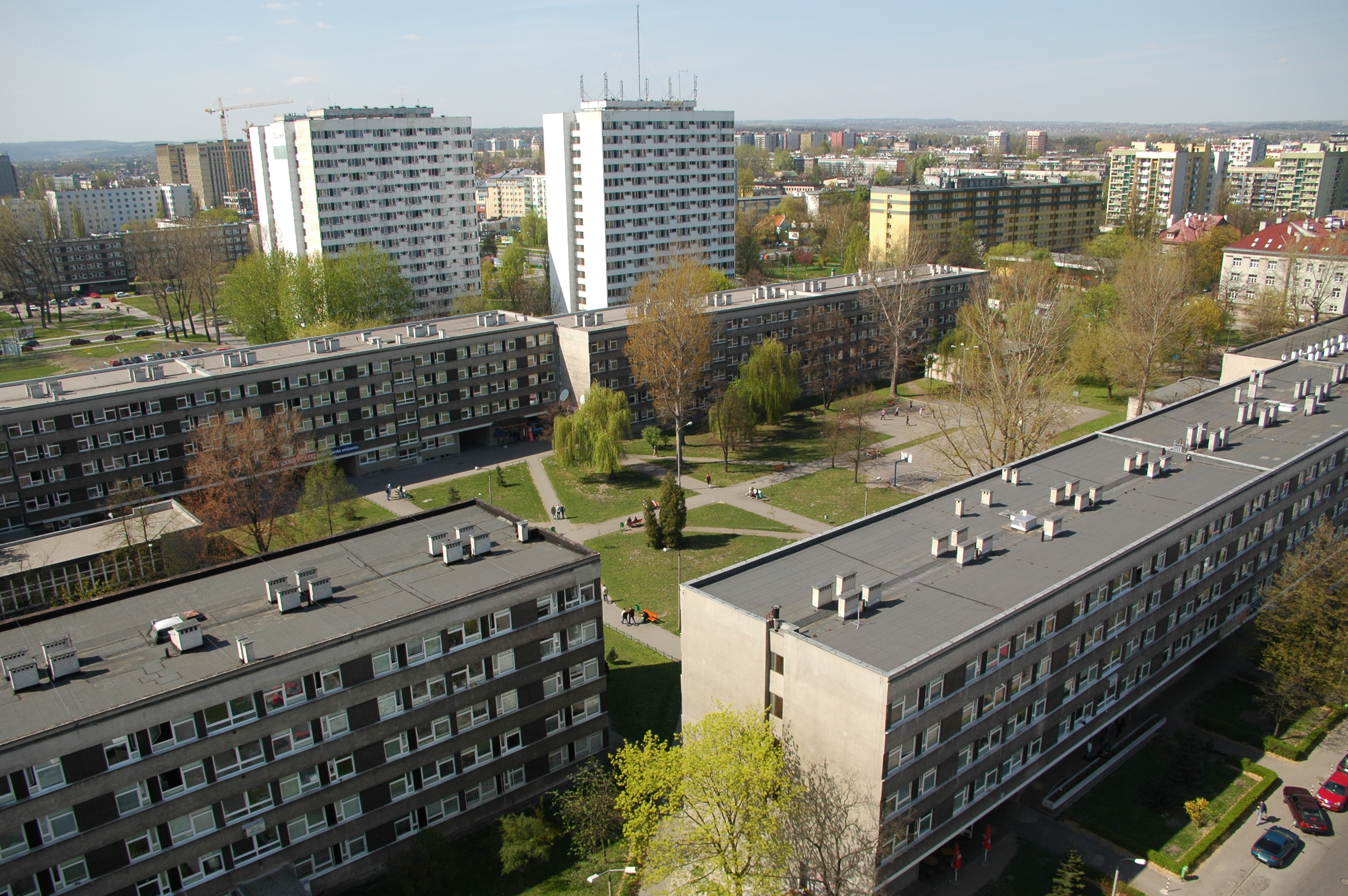
- Location: Kraków, District Krowodrza
- Established: 1978

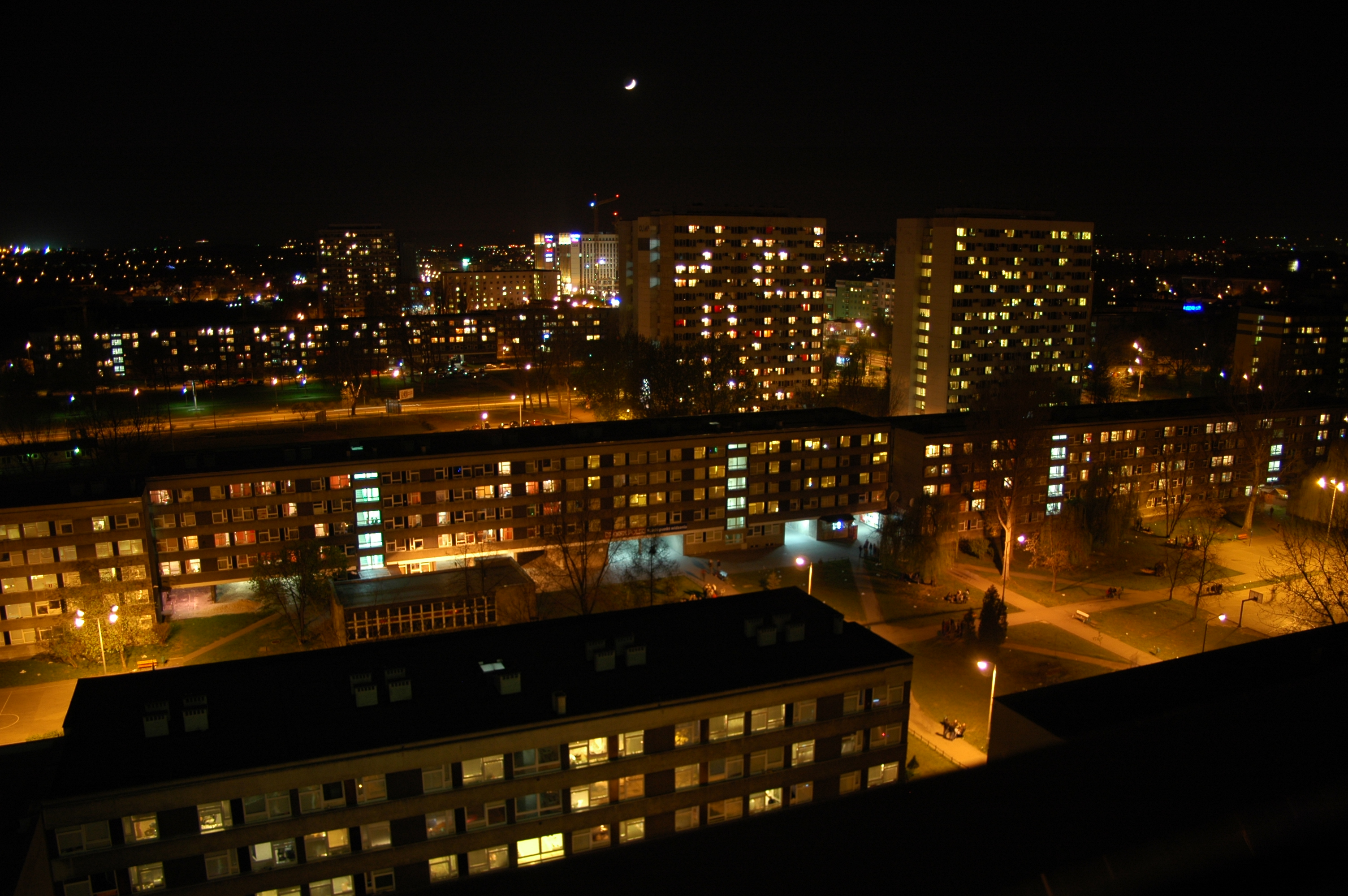
Miasteczko Studenckie AGH – night

Miasteczko Studenckie AGH is the student campus of AGH University of Kraków and an osiedle in Kraków. It lies mostly between Reymonta, Tokarskiego, Nawojki and Miechowska streets.

There are 8500 accommodations for students of AGH (5400 places), Jagiellonian University, Pedagogical University of Kraków, Kraków University of Economics, Agricultural University of Kraków, and others.

Rooms are occupied by 2–3 persons each.

In the summer, it becomes the biggest hotel center in Poland, offering 4,000 accommodations.

Due to the extraterritoriality of the university, it's the only place in Kraków where drinking alcohol in the open air is allowed.

== Dorms ==
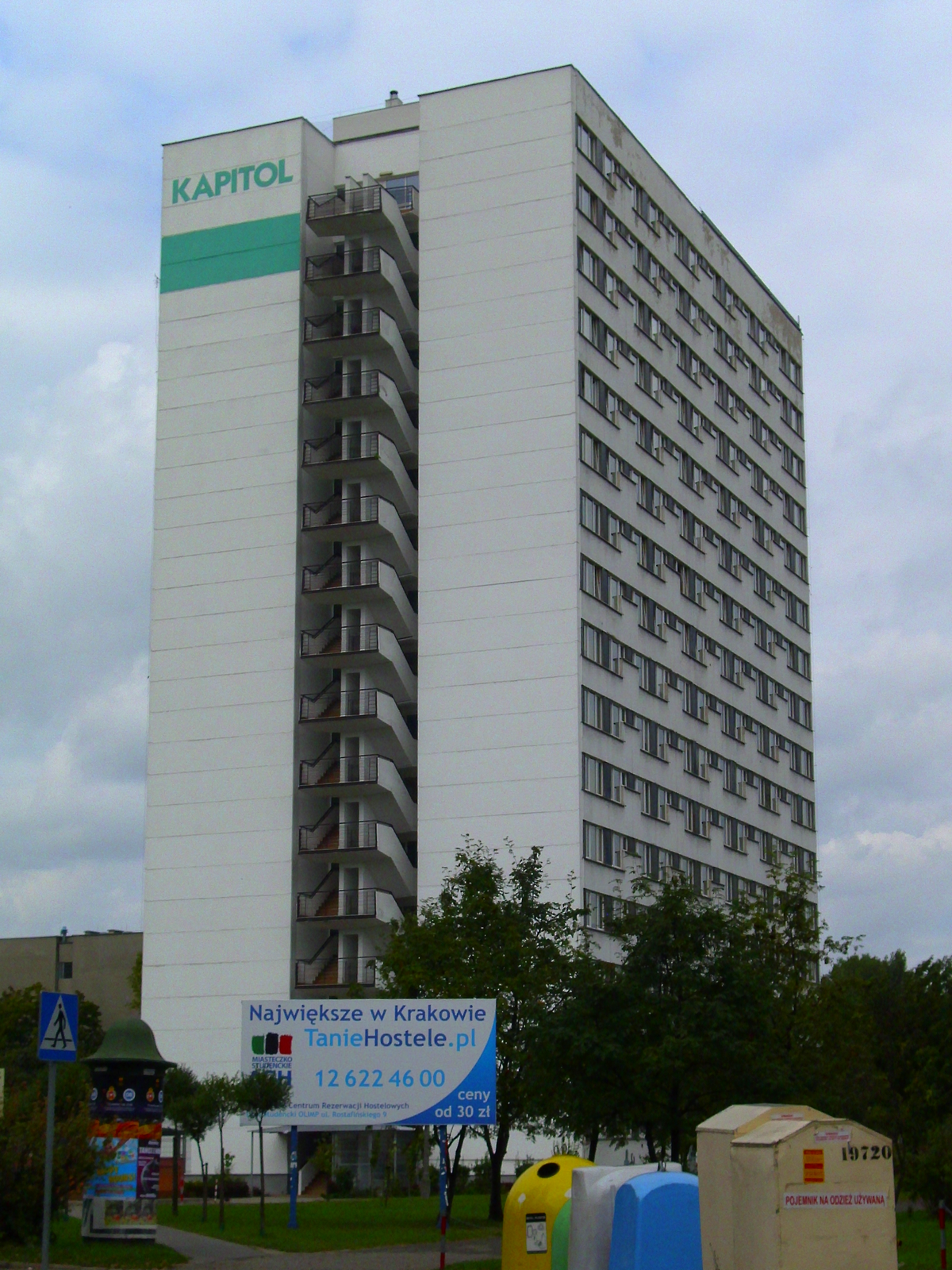
Dom Studencki nr 14 "KAPITOL"

- Dom Studencki nr 1 "OLIMP" ul. Rostafińskiego 9
- Dom Studencki nr 2 "BABILON" ul. Rostafińskiego 11
- Dom Studencki nr 3 "AKROPOL" ul. Tokarskiego 1
- Dom Studencki nr 4 "FILUTEK" ul. Rostafińskiego 10
- Dom Studencki nr 5 "STRUMYK" ul. Rostafińskiego 8
- Dom Studencki nr 6 "BRATEK" ul. Rostafińskiego 6
- Dom Studencki nr 7 "ZAŚCIANEK" ul. Rostafińskiego 4
- Dom Studencki nr 8 "STOKROTKA" ul. Rostafińskiego 2
- Dom Studencki nr 9 "OMEGA" ul. Budryka 9
- Dom Studencki nr 10 "HAJDUCZEK" ul. Budryka 7
- Dom Studencki nr 11 "BONUS" ul. Budryka 5
- Dom Studencki nr 12 "PROMYK" ul. Budryka 3
- Dom Studencki nr 13 "STRASZNY DWÓR" ul. Budryka 1
- Dom Studencki nr 14 "KAPITOL" ul. Budryka 2
- Dom Studencki nr 15 "MARATON" ul. Tokarskiego 10
- Dom Studencki nr 16 "ITAKA" ul. Tokarskiego 8
- Dom Studencki nr 17 "ARKADIA" ul. Tokarskiego 6
- Dom Studencki nr 18 ul. Tokarskiego 4
- Dom Studencki nr 19 ul. Tokarskiego 2
- Dom Studencki "ALFA" ul. Reymonta 17

== Traditions ==
- "Janosik" - making noise with cookware and other hardware to play a melody from the Janosik television series.
- "Papieżowa" - at 9:37 p.m., students gather at the basketball court to sing Barka and an AGH-themed version of Wisła chant.
- Every year there are snowball battles between dorms.
- Grilling is very common on the grass between dorms.
