= Krowodrza =

- Dzielnica of Kraków
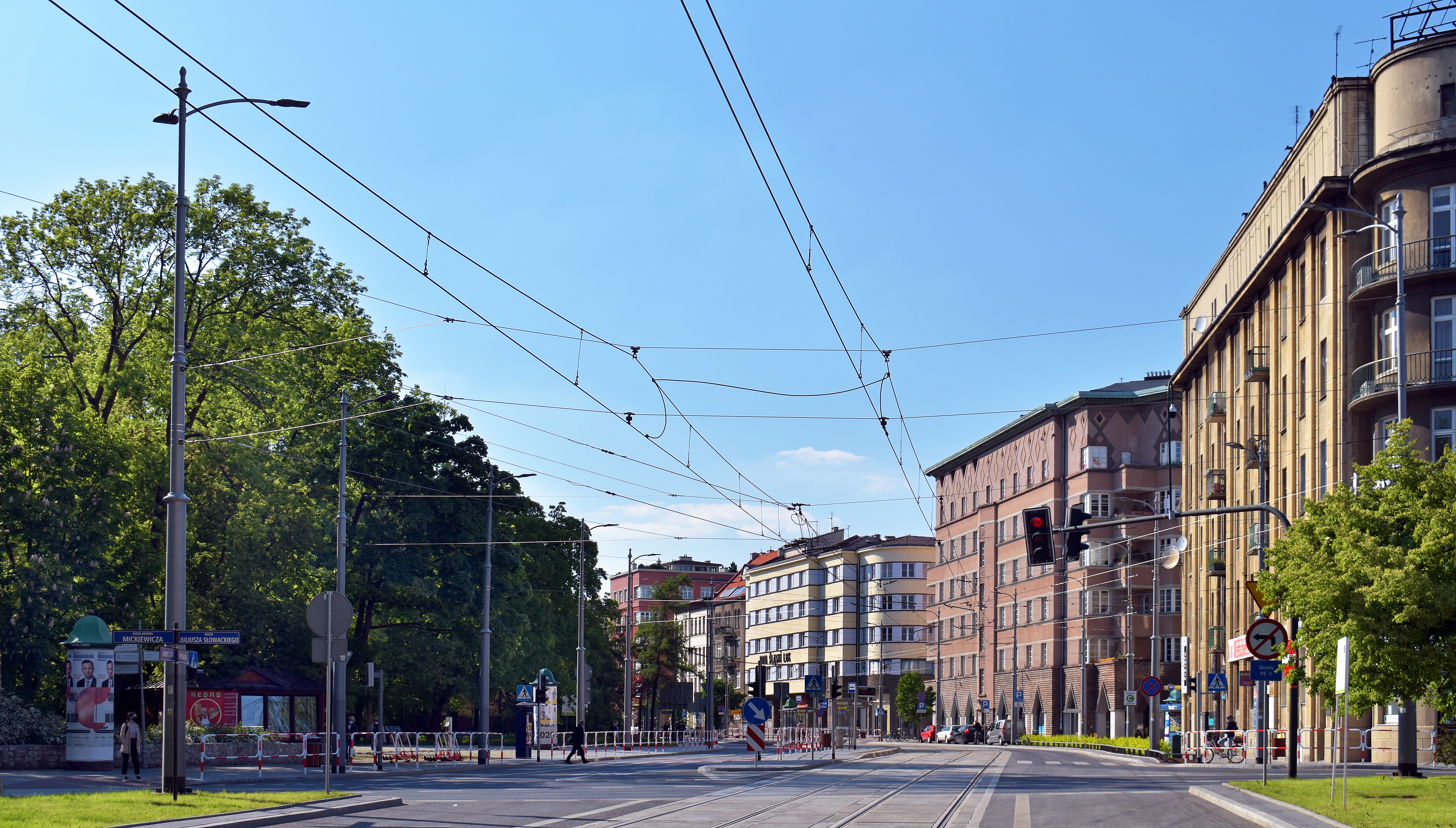
- Iwalidów square

- Location of Krowodrza within Kraków
- Coordinates: 50°4′0″N 19°55′0″E
- Country: Poland
- Voivodeship: Lesser Poland
- County/City: Kraków

Government
  - President: Zygmunt Wierzbicki

Area
  - Total: 5.62 km^{2} (2.17 sq mi)

Population (2014)
  - Total: 31,870
  - Density: 5,670/km^{2} (14,700/sq mi)
- Time zone: UTC+1 (CET)
  - Summer (DST): UTC+2 (CEST)
- Area code: +48 12
- Website: http://www.dzielnica5.krakow.pl

Krowodrza is one of 18 districts of Kraków, located in the western part of the city. The name Krowodrza comes from a village of same name that is now a part of the district.

According to the Central Statistical Office data, the district's area is 5.62 square kilometres (2.17 square miles) and 31 870 people inhabit Krowodrza.

== History ==
The oldest part of the district is Łobzów, originally a village, which is home to a royal palace built in the 14th century and later rebuilt in the 16th, 17th and 19th centuries. In addition to Łobzów, the current district also includes the former villages of Krowodrza, Czarna Wieś and Nowa Wieś. All of them were incorporated into Krakow in 1910, after which they underwent significant metropolitan development.

== Subdivisions of Krowodrza ==
Krowodrza is divided into smaller subdivisions (osiedles). Here's a list of them.

- Cichy Kącik
- Czarna Wieś
- Krowodrza
- Łobzów
- Miasteczko Studenckie AGH
- Nowa Wieś

== Buildings ==
- Łobzów Royal Palace - first built in the 14th century, rebuilt many times since then, now houses the Faculty of Architecture of the Cracow University of Technology
- Fort "Kleparz" - part of the Kraków Fortress, built 1856-1859
- AGH University Main Building, designed by Sławomir Odrzywolski and Wacław Krzyżanowski, built 1924-1935 in Neoclassical style
- ZUPU tenement house, designed by Wacław Nowakowski and built 1927-1929 in Expressionist style
- Jagiellonian Library, designed by Wacław Krzyżanowski and built 1929–39
- Silesian House - built 1932-1937 in modernist style
- St Stephen's Church - designed by Zdzisław Mączeński and Franciszek Mączyński, built 1933–1938
- Main Building of the National Museum in Kraków, designed by Adolf Szyszko-Bohusz, Czesław Boratyński, Edward Kreisler and Bolesław Szmidt, built 1933-1989 in Modernist style
- Housing estate for officials of the General Government on Królewska Street - built in Nazi architecture style in the years 1941–1943
- Biprostal - high-rise office building built 1959-1965 in the International Style, famous for its giant mosaik by Celina Styrylska-Taranczewska on the side wall
- Miasteczko Studenckie AGH - student campus built 1964-1975 in modernist style
- Radio Kraków headquarters - built 1996-1999 in Postmodern style

== Gallery ==
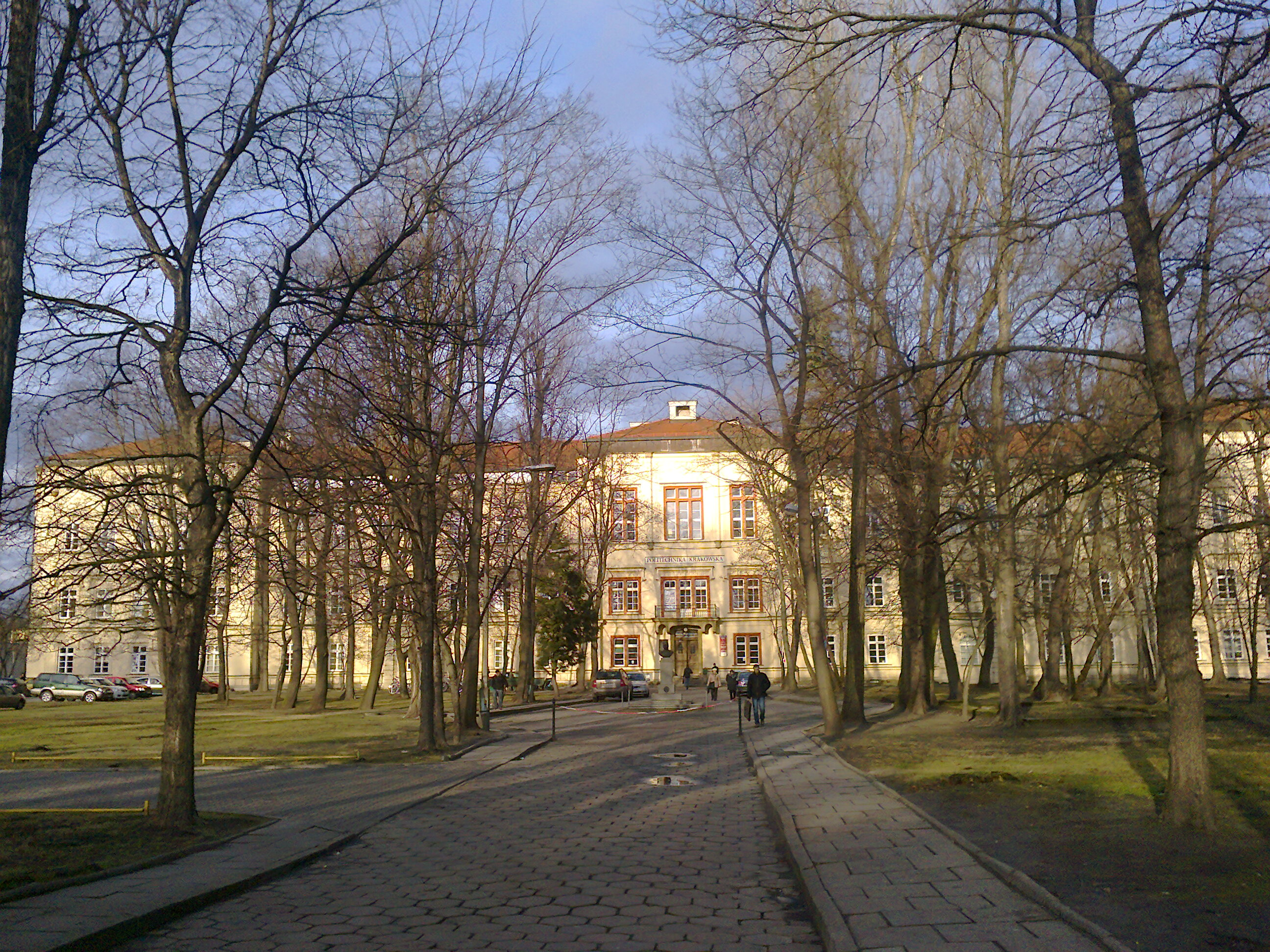
Łobzów Royal Palace

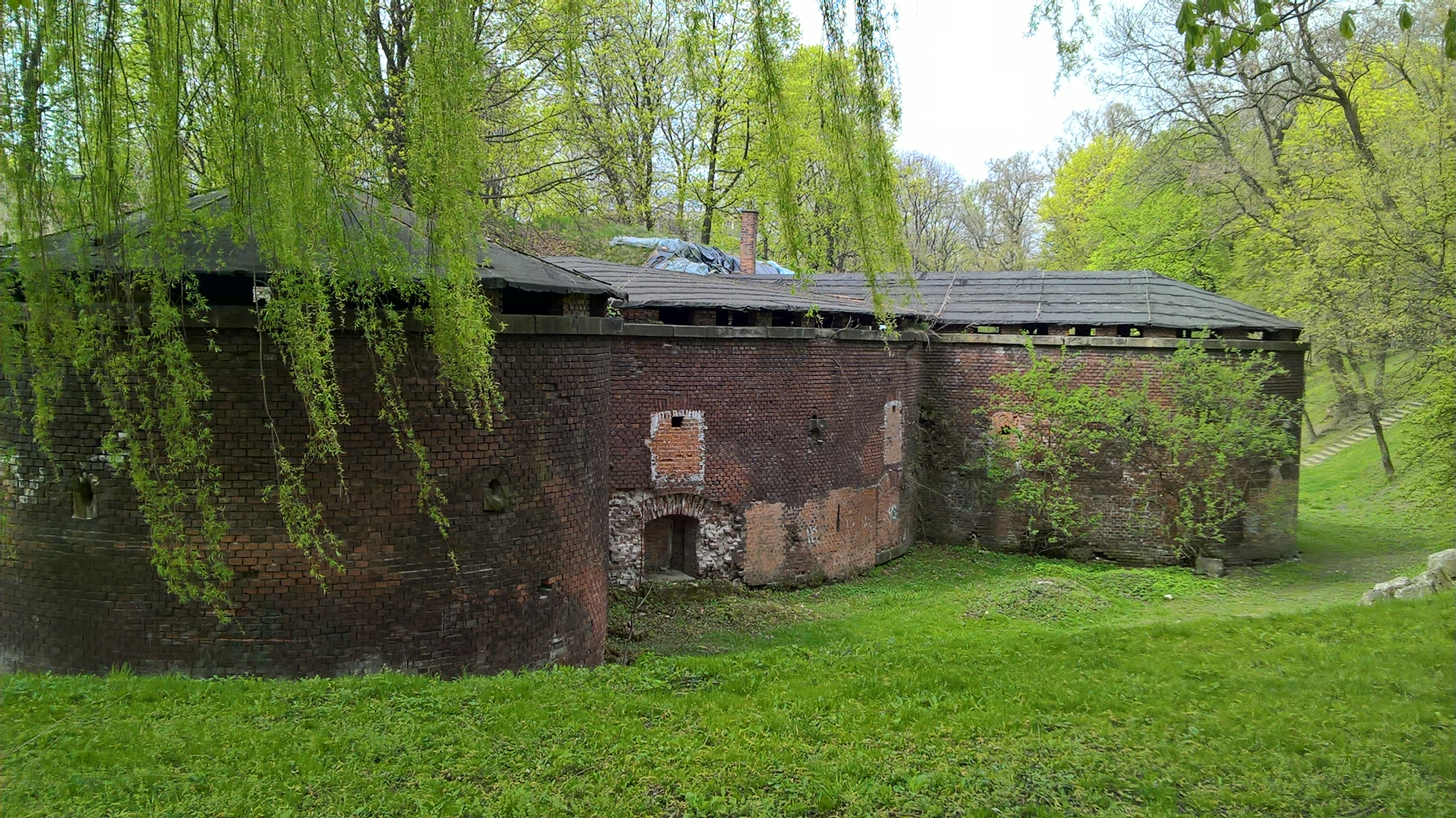
Fort "Kleparz"

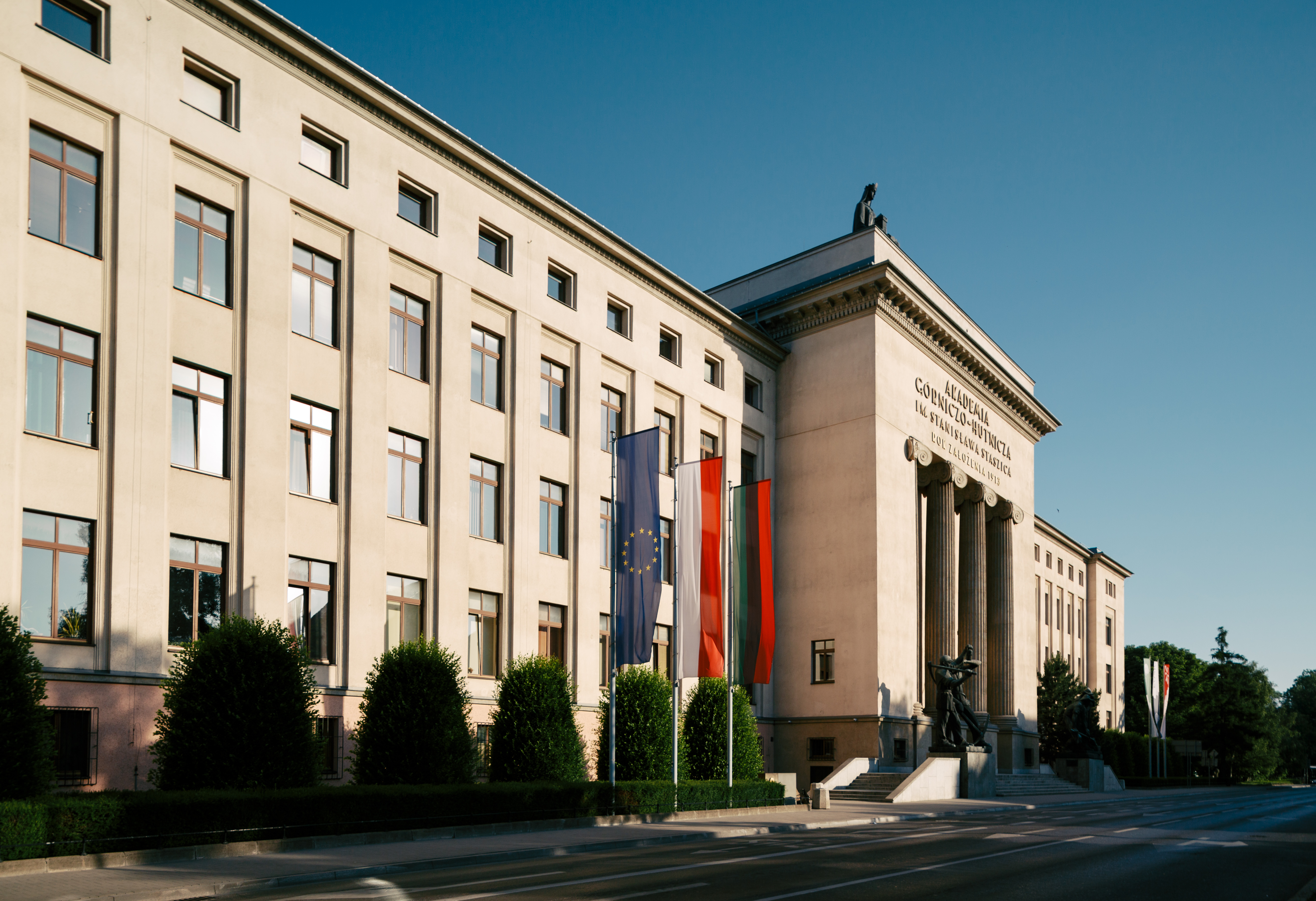
AGH University Main Building

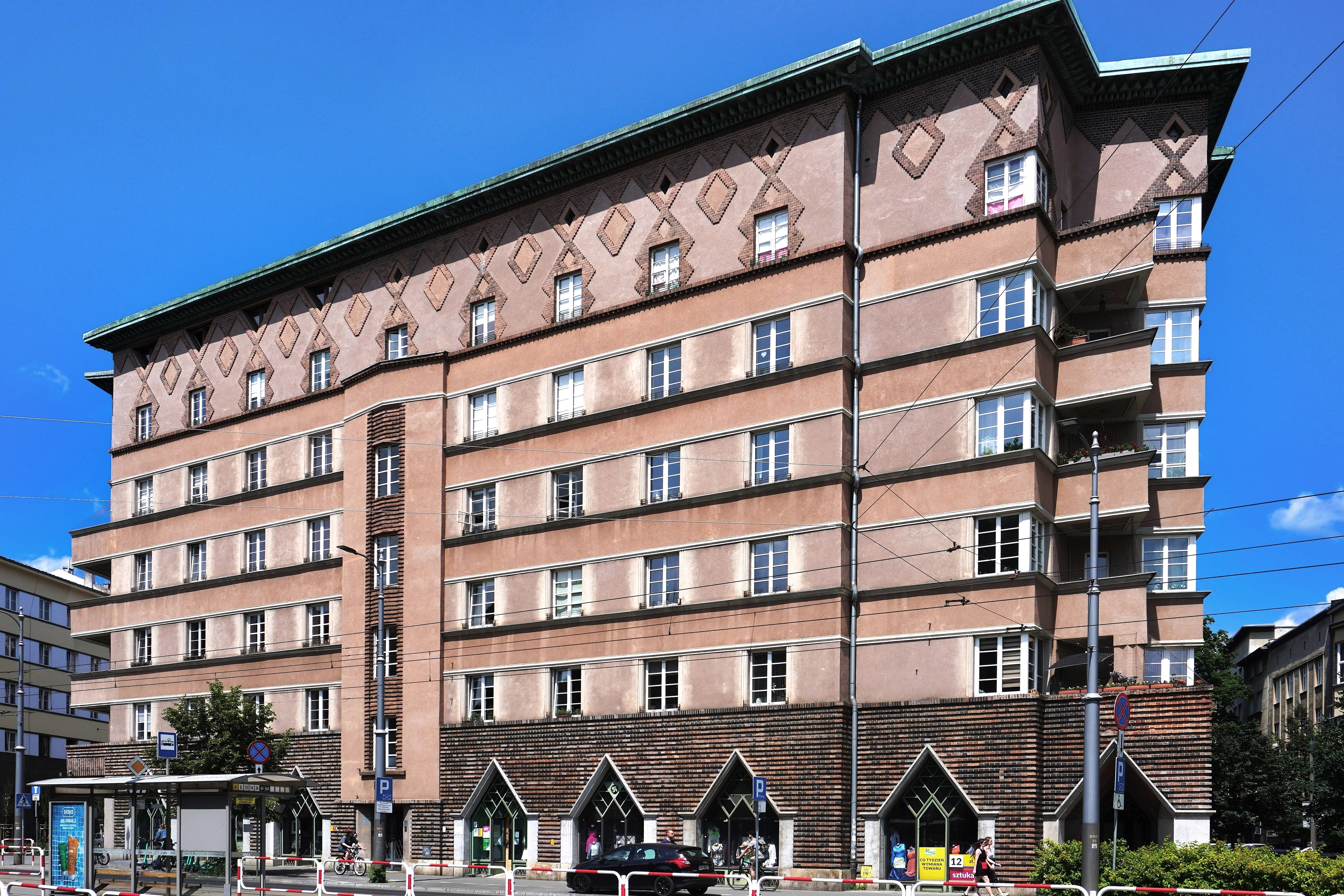
ZUPU tenement house

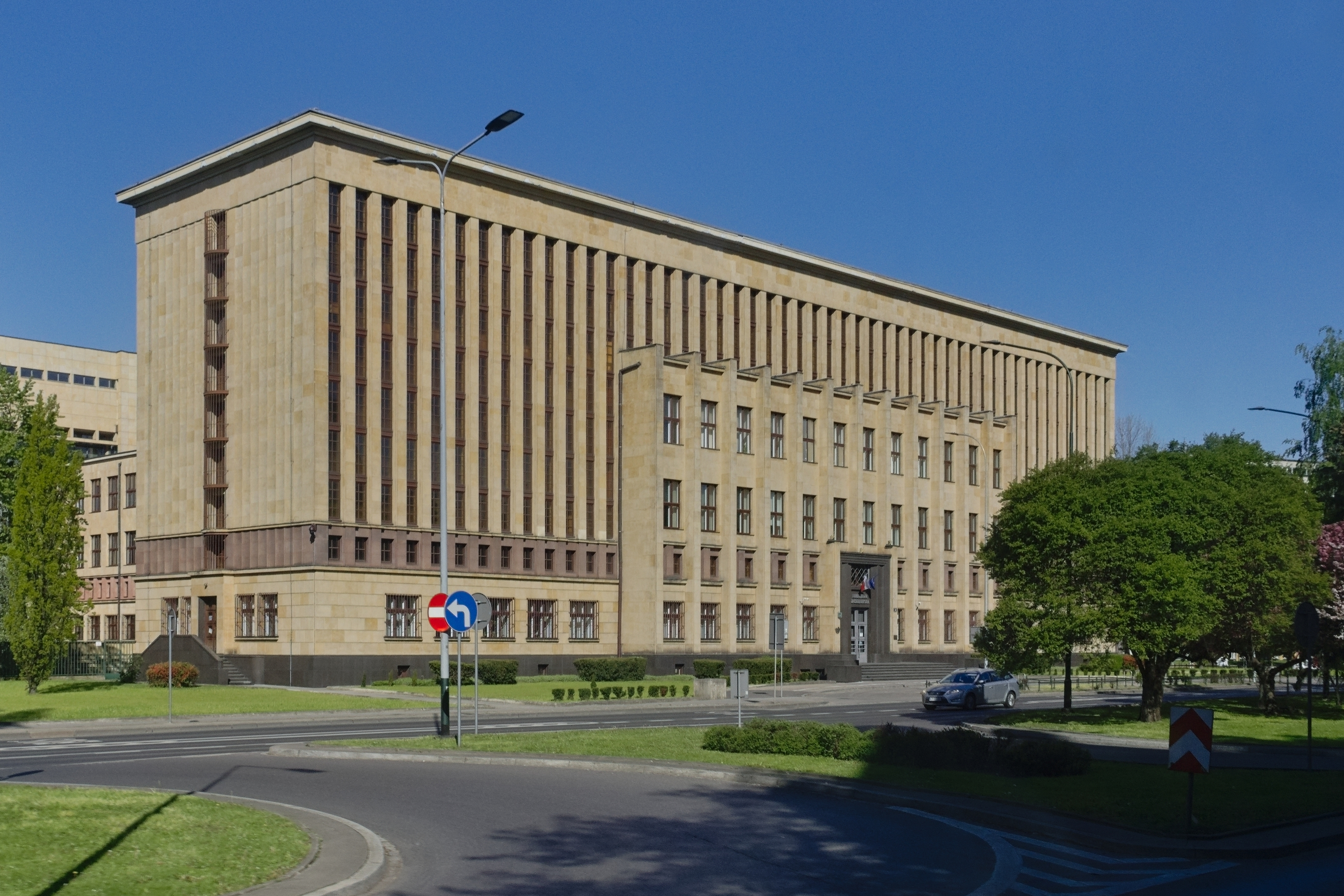
Jagiellonian Library

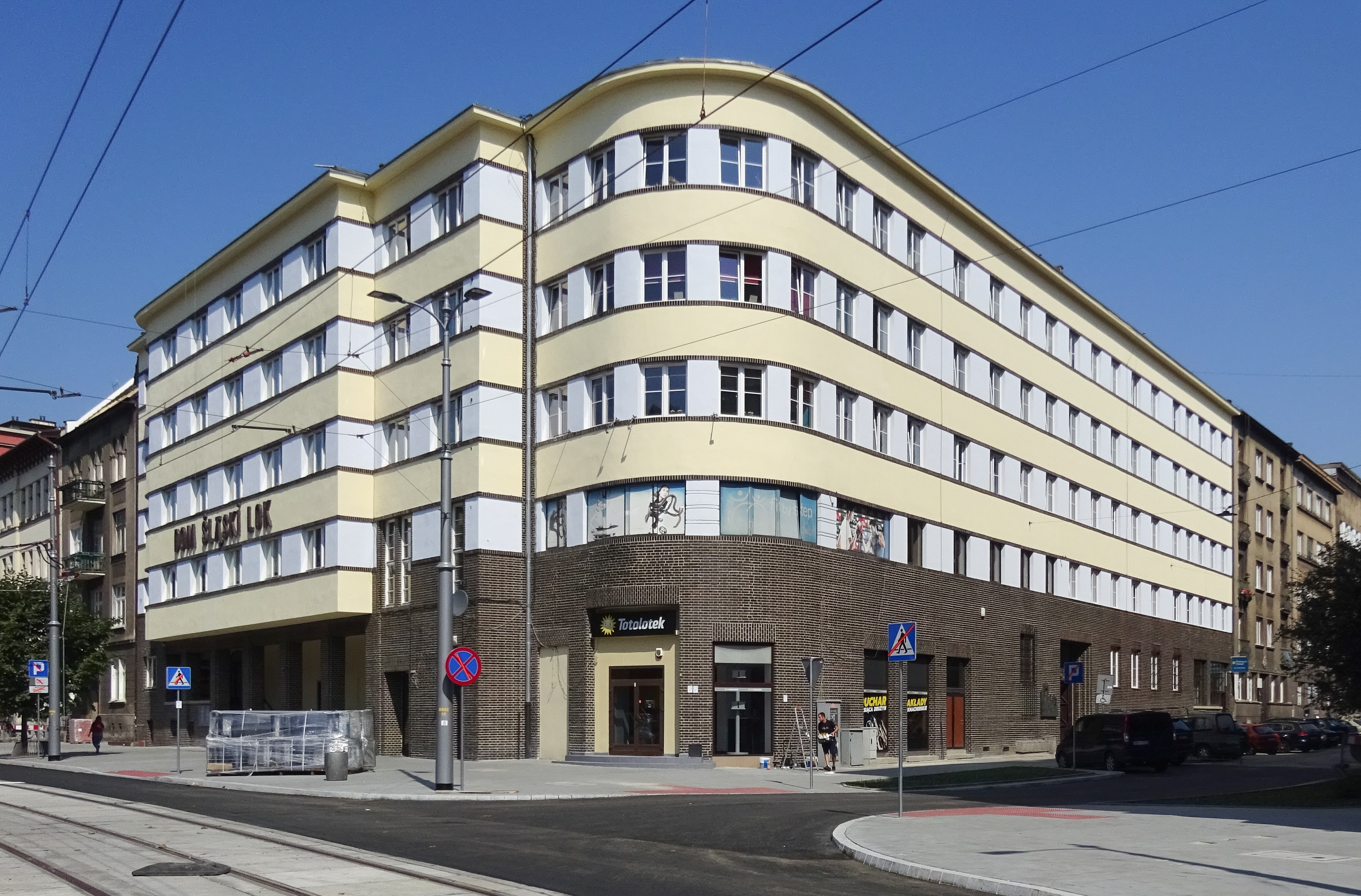
Silesian House

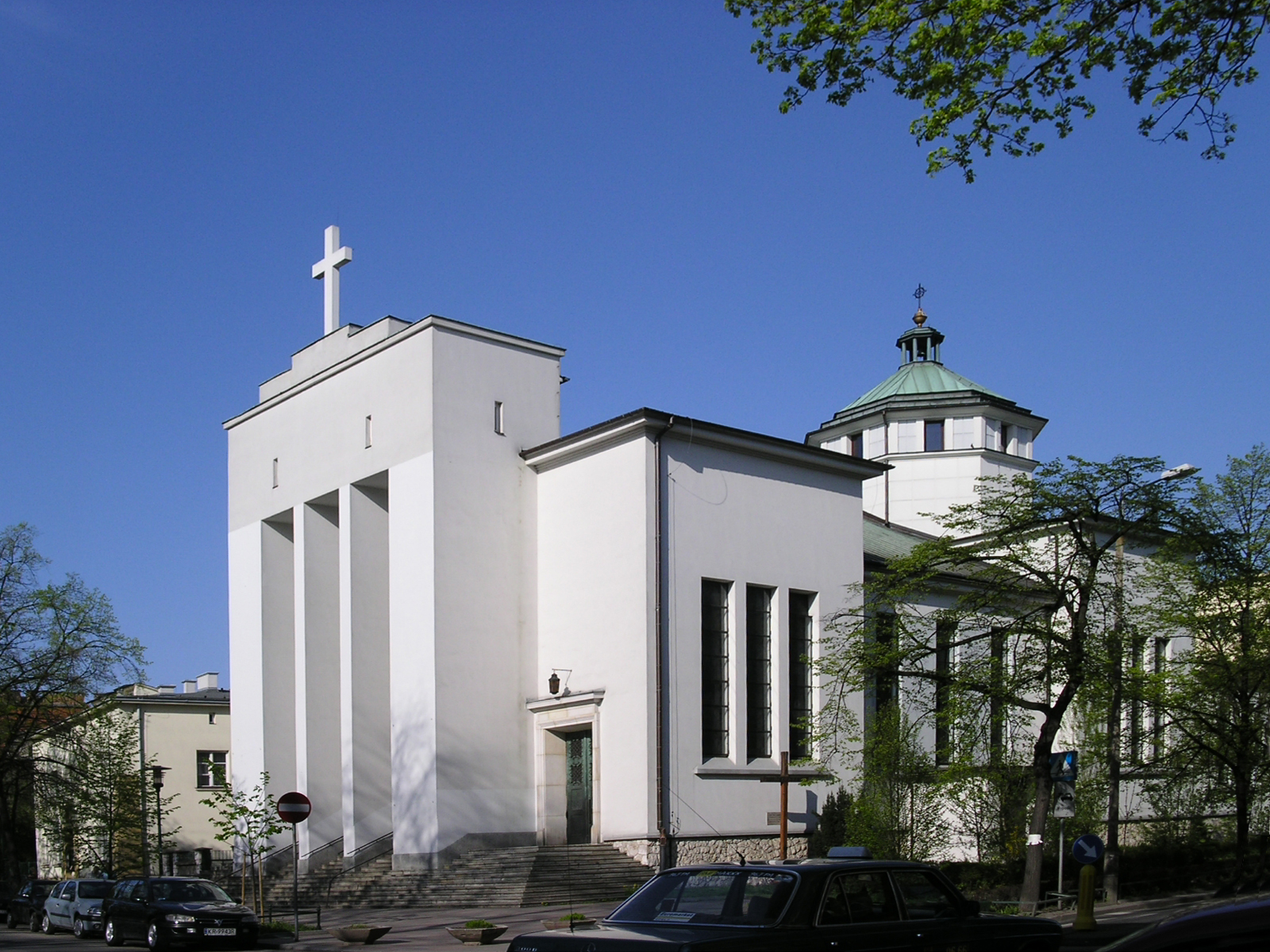
St Stephen's Church

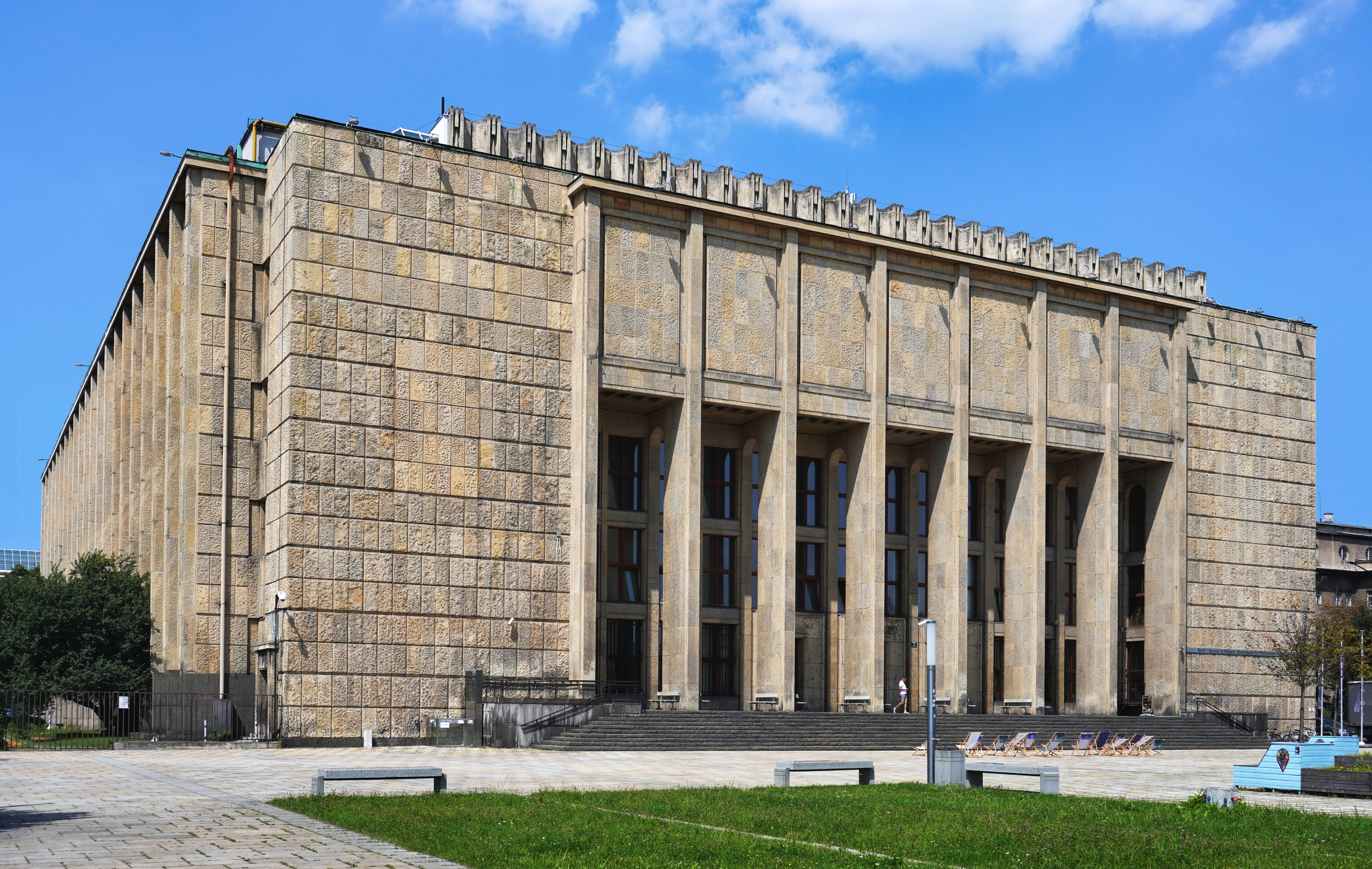
Main Building of the National Museum in Kraków

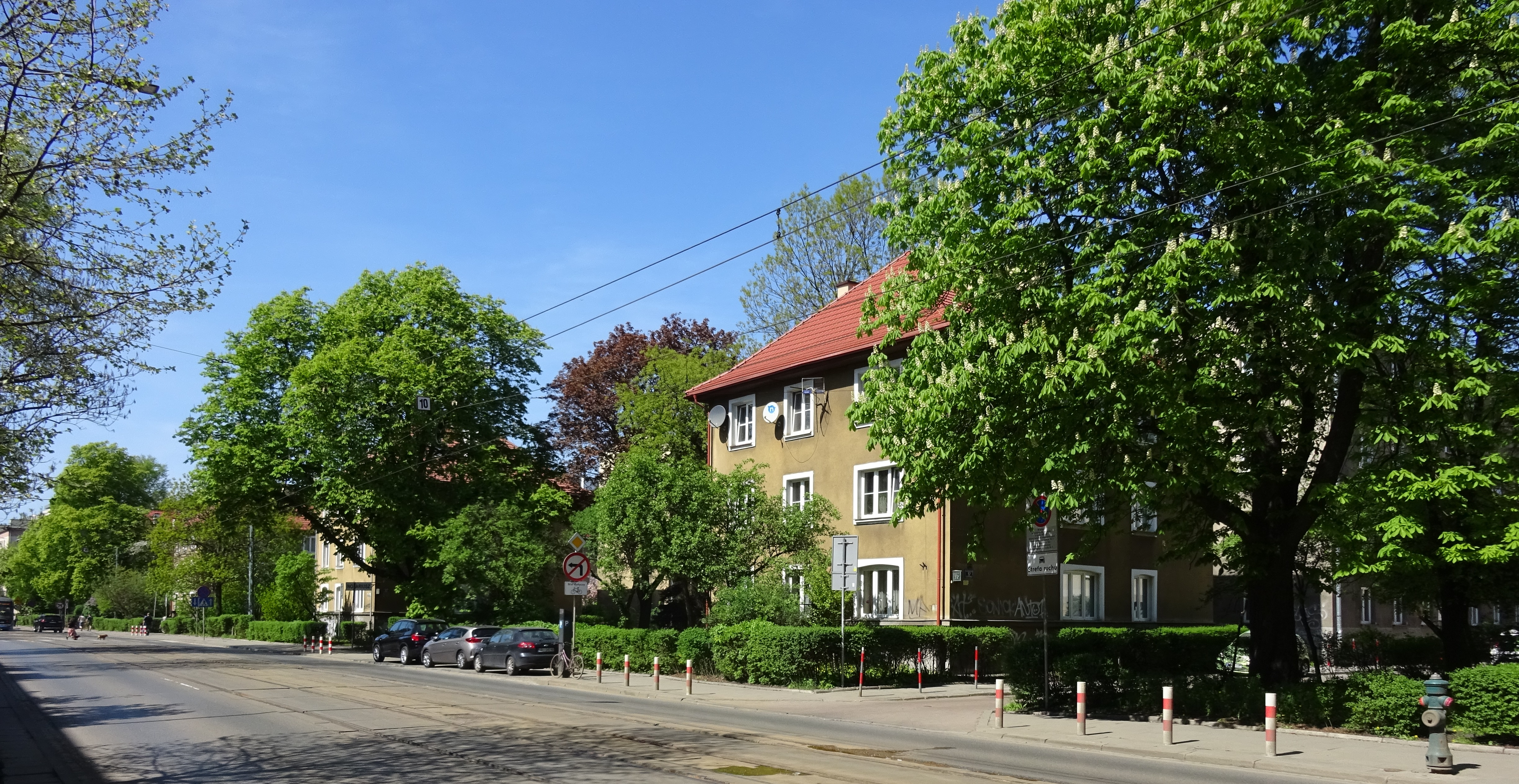
Housing estate for officials of the General Government

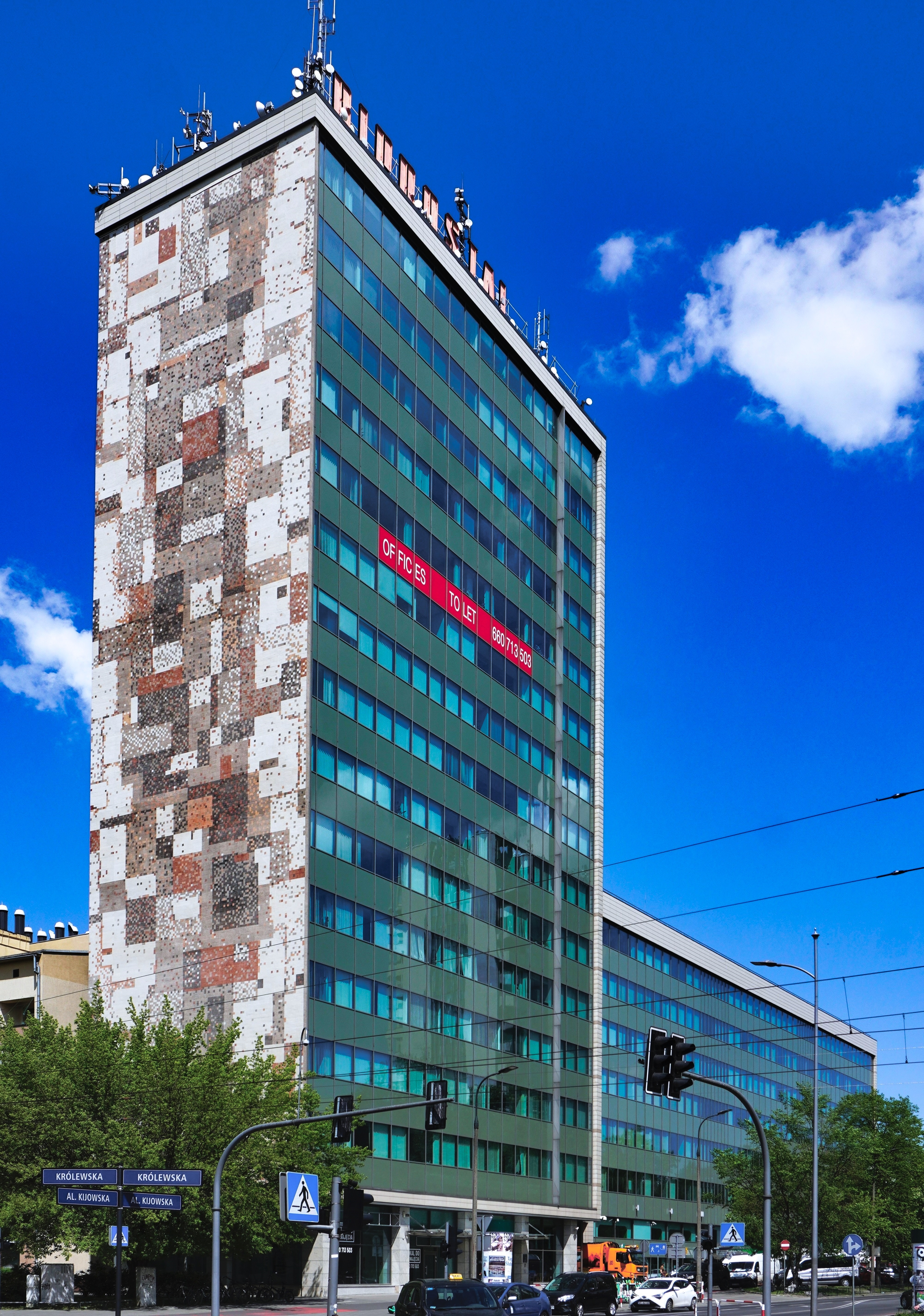
Biprostal

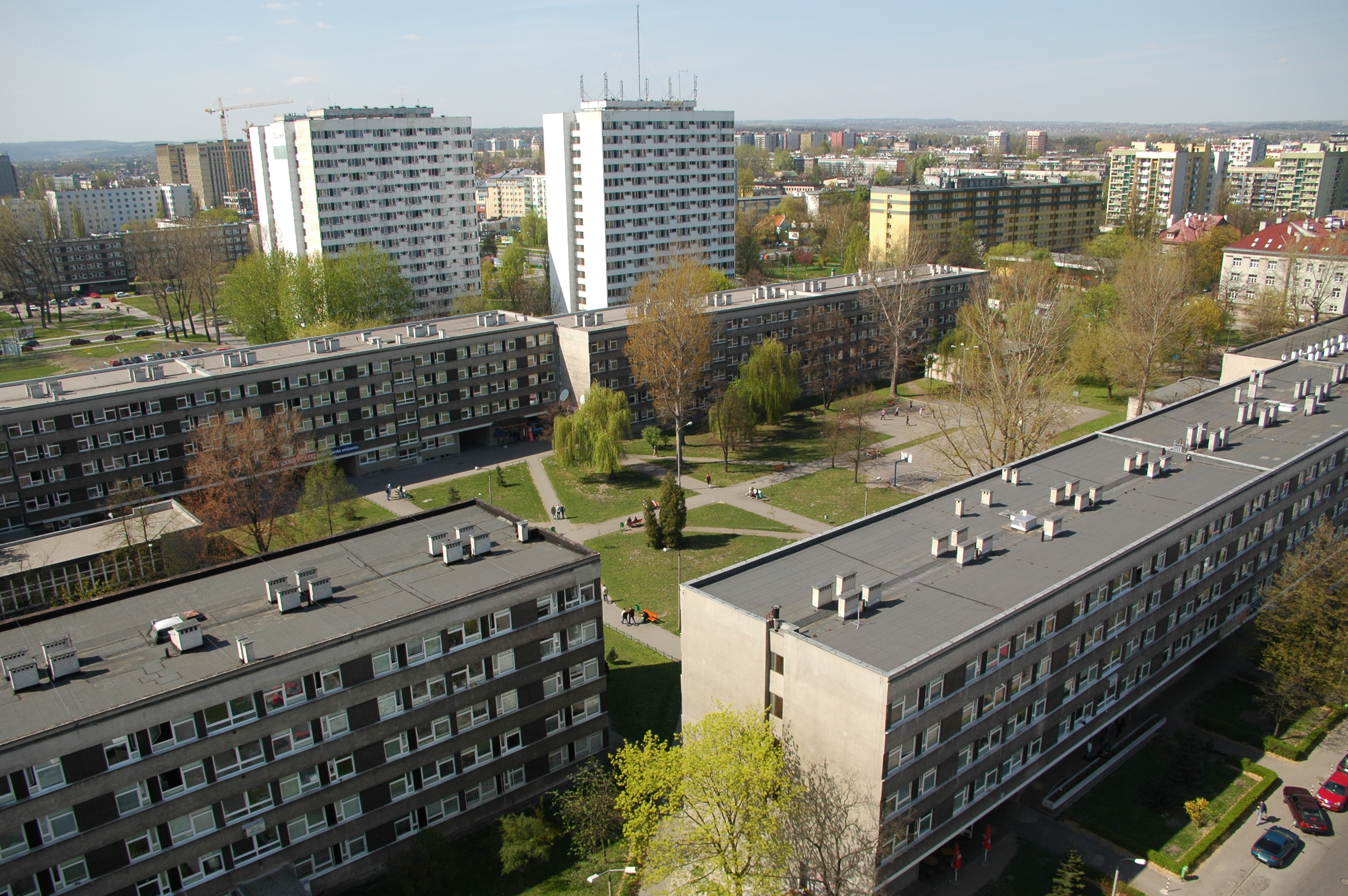
Miasteczko Studenckie AGH

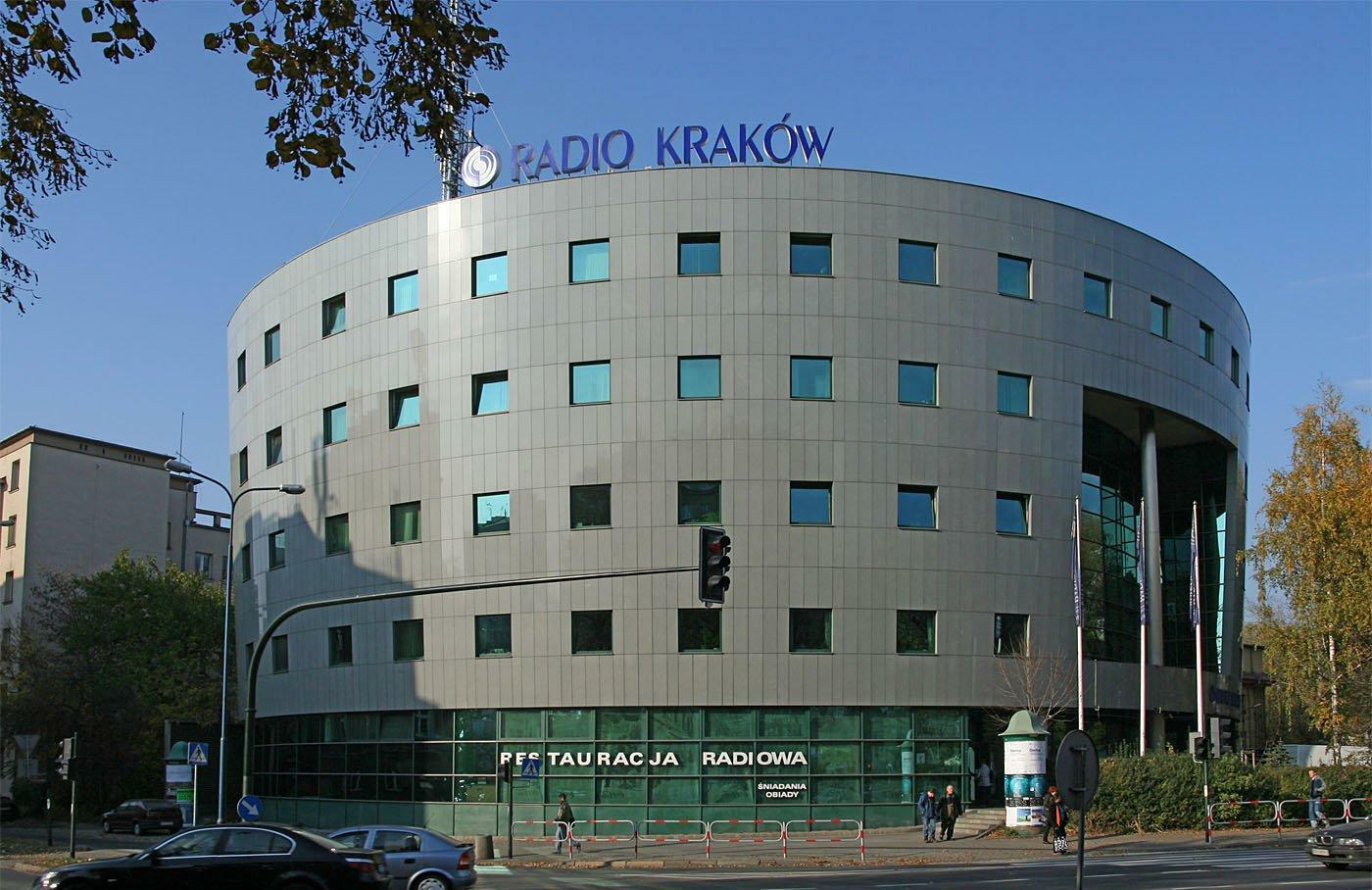
Radio Kraków headquarters
