= AGH University of Kraków =

Technical university in Kraków, Poland

Coordinates: 50°03′52.3″N 19°55′25.5″E

AGH University of Krakow
- Akademia Górniczo-Hutnicza im. Stanisława Staszica w Krakowie
- Logo
- Other name: AGH
- Motto: Labore creata, labori et scientiae servio
- Motto in English: "Born in labour, I serve the labour and science"
- Type: Public
- Established: 1913
- Affiliations: EUA, IAU, SEFI
- Rector: Professor Jerzy Lis
- Faculty: 18
- Students: 21,121 (12.2025)
- Doctoral students: 909 (31 December 2025)
- Location: Kraków, Poland
- Campus: Urban
- Colors: Green, black and red
- Website: agh.edu.pl

University rankings

Global – Overall
- ARWU World: 701–800 (2026)
- CWTS World: 500 (2026)
- QS World: 761-770 (2027)

AGH University of Krakow, (abbreviated as AGH University; formerly: AGH University of Science and Technology or AGH UST; in full the Stanisław Staszic Mining and Metallurgical Academy in Kraków (Polish: Akademia Górniczo-Hutnicza im. Stanisława Staszica w Krakowie)) is a public university in Kraków, Poland. Founded in 1913, its inauguration took place in 1919. The AGH University focuses on innovative technologies, its research profile also includes engineering disciplines, exact sciences, Earth sciences, and social sciences.

The AGH University is one of 10 Polish higher education institutions that has been granted the status of a research university. It has 18 faculties, the AGH University Academic Centre for Materials and Nanotechnology, and numerous didactic centres. It offers three levels of education: first-cycle, second-cycle, and third-cycle (doctoral schools). The AGH University educates more than 21,000 students and employs more than 2,300 academic staff (including more than 260 professors and more than 500 associate professors).

The AGH University regularly ranks first among Polish technical universities in the Center for World University Rankings or the Academic Ranking of World Universities.

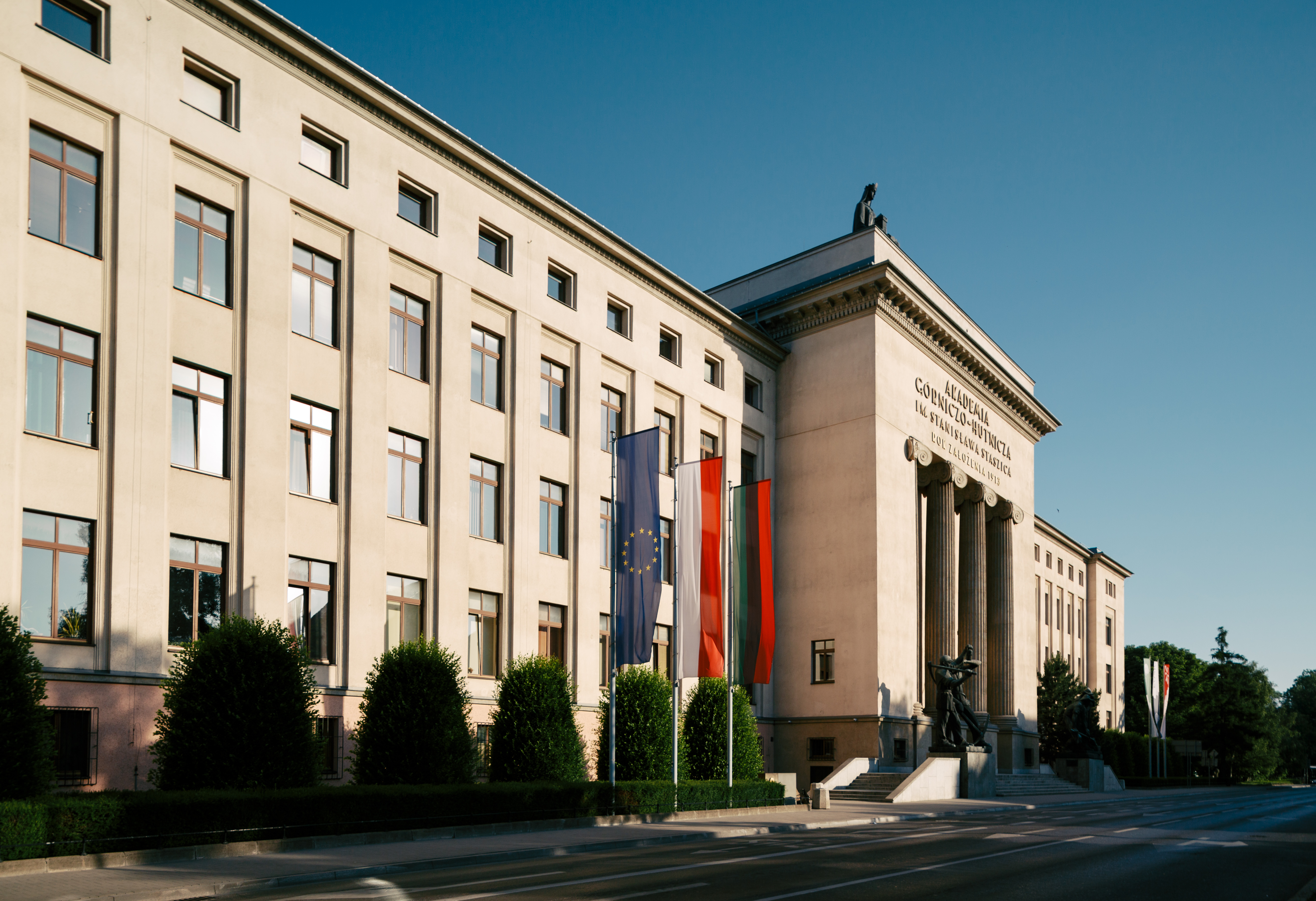
AGH University Main Building

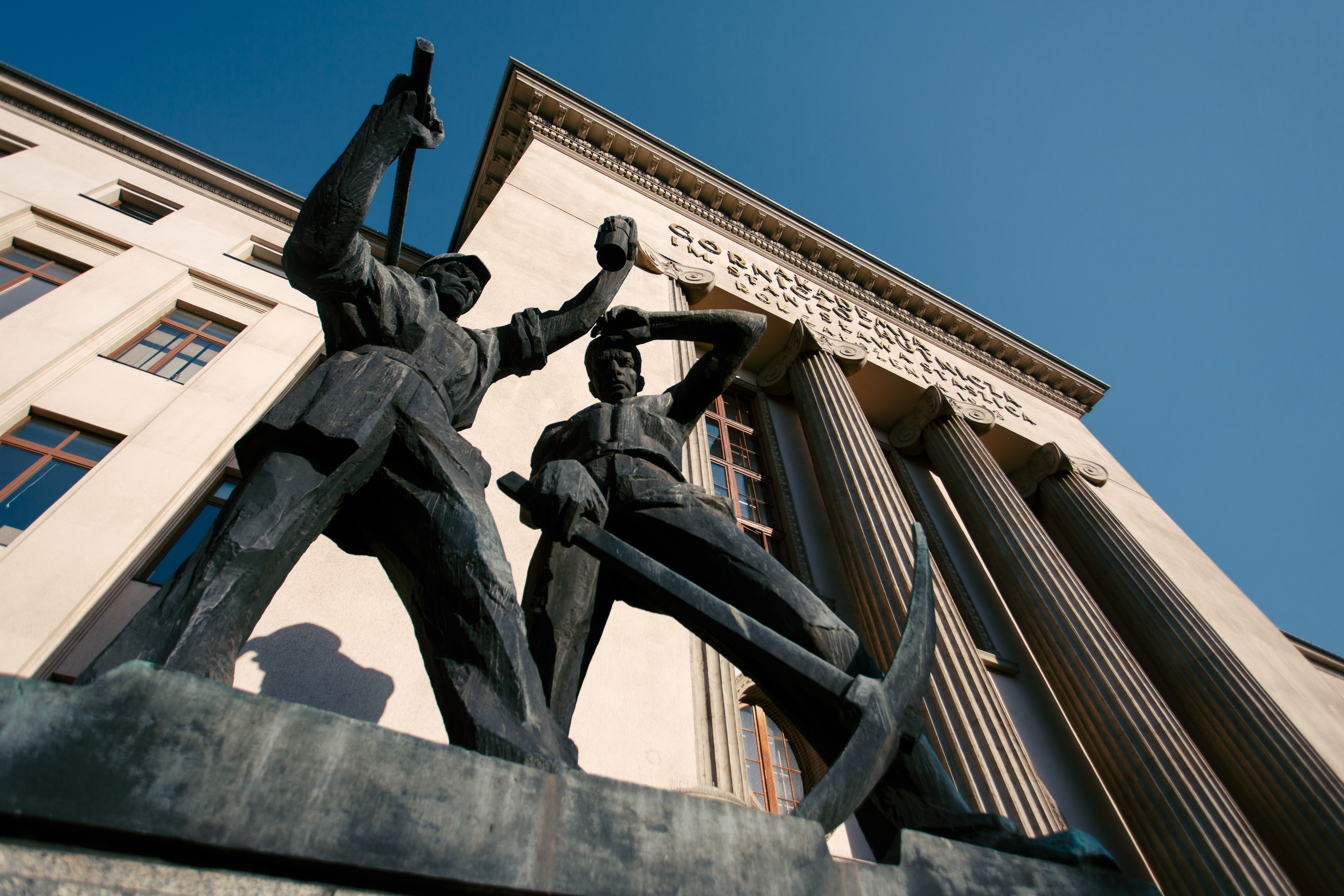
Main Building façade

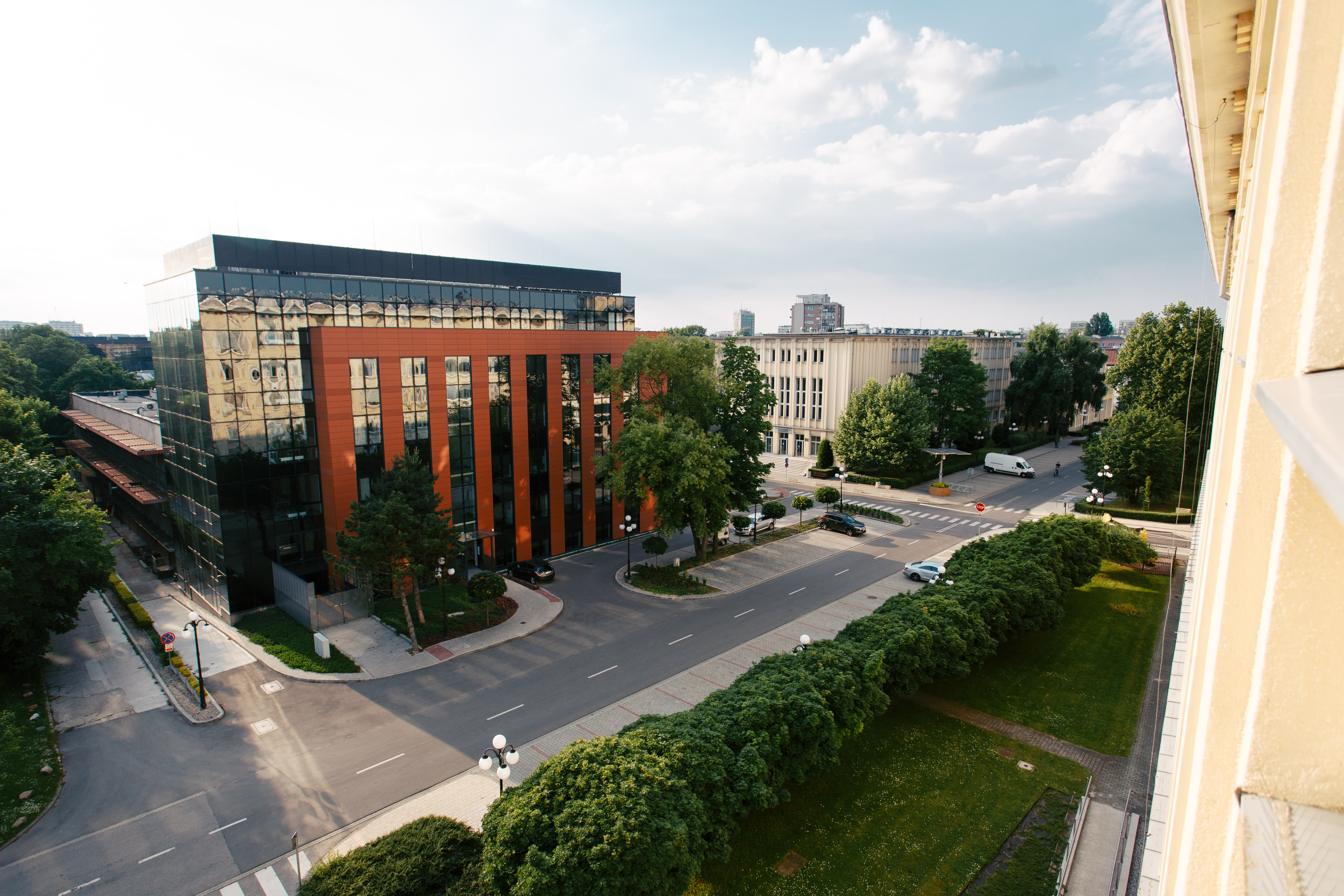
Faculty of Drilling, Oil and Gas and Faculty of Electrical Engineering, Automatics, Computer Science and Engineering in Biomedicine

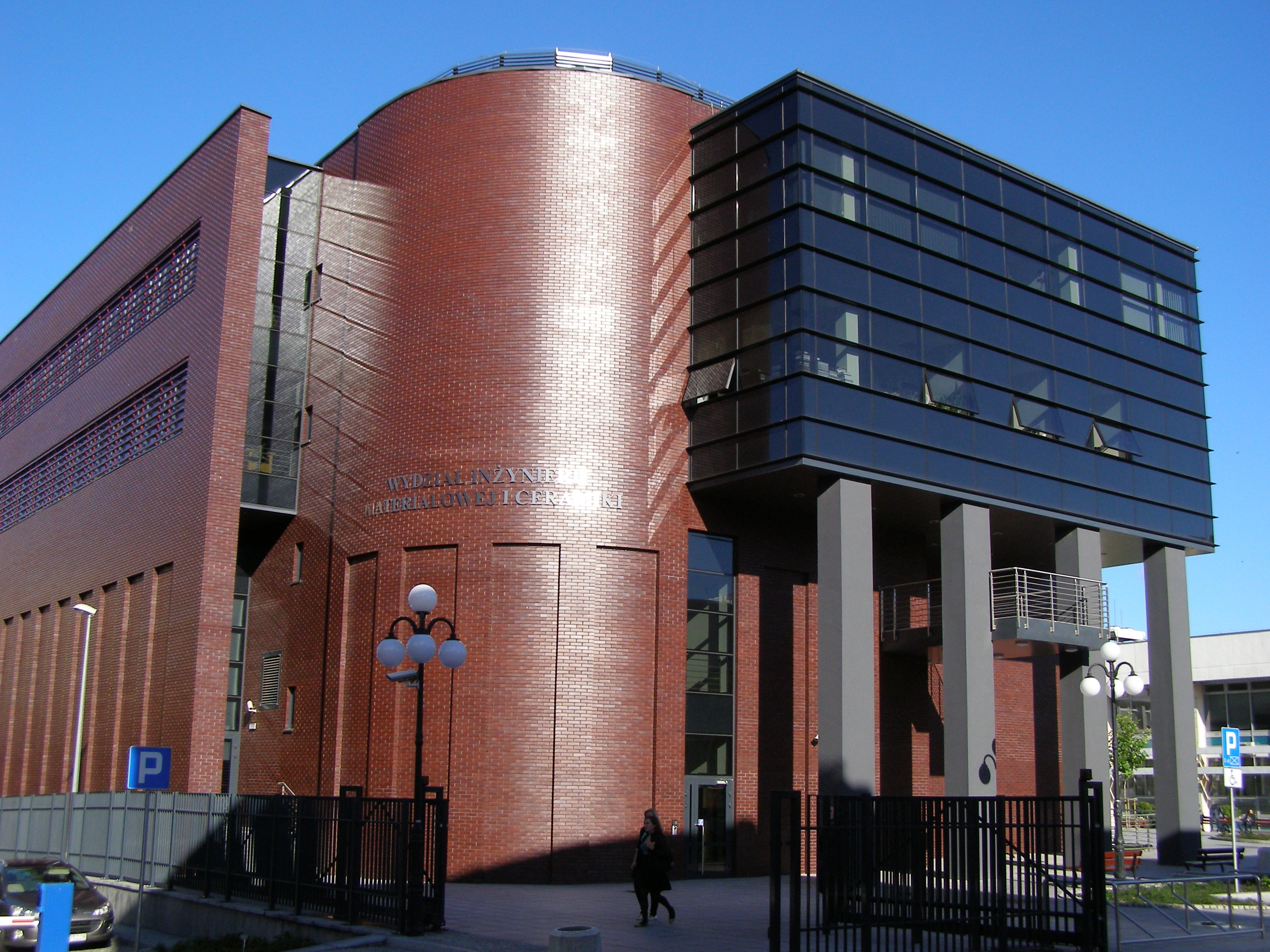
Faculty of Materials Science and Ceramics

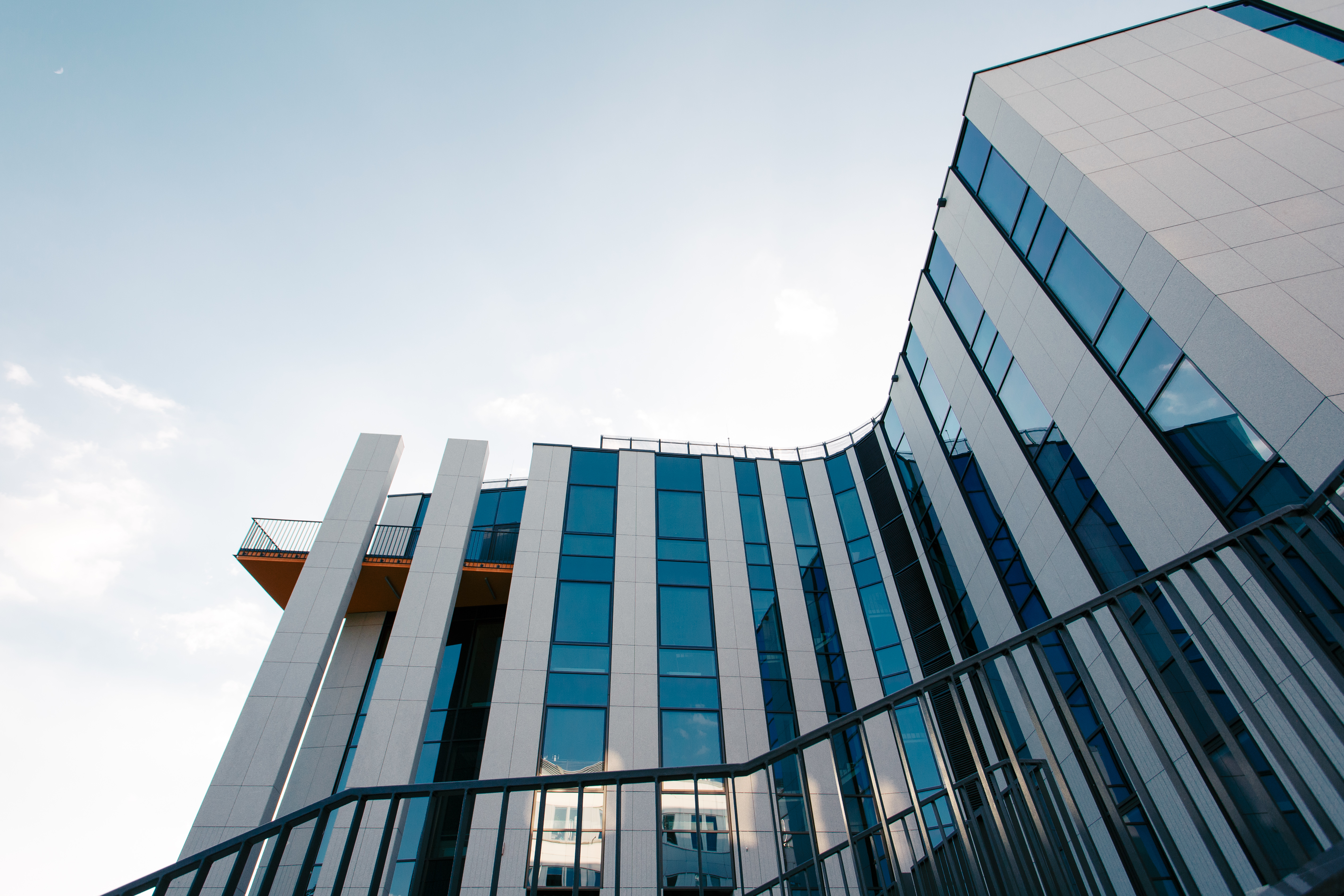
Faculty of Physics and Applied Computer Science

== Governance ==
The Rector is a one-person university body; the AGH University collegial bodies include: University Council, Senate, and Scientific Discipline Councils.

The Rector serves as the executive head of the AGH University, plays a prominent representative role, and acts as the governing body over staff, students, and doctoral students. The Rector has five Vice-Rectors who aid in governing the AGH University.

The AGH University Council comprises six people appointed by the Senate (including three people from outside the academic community) and the chairperson of the student government.

The Senate comprises:

- Rector as the Chairperson
- Professors and Associate Professors
- Academic teachers
- Non-academic staff
- Students and doctoral students who constitute, one student for each faculty, and at least one doctoral student's representative.

For a scientific discipline that is classified at least into category B+ (by the Polish Ministry of Science and Higher Education), a Scientific Discipline Council is established. Currently, there are 17 scientific discipline councils at the AGH University.

== Rankings ==
- The Center for World University Rankings, CWUR (2026 edition) – 1st place among Polish technical universities; world rank: 627th place.
- ARWU Academic Ranking of World Universities 2026 World Top 1000, Shanghai Ranking (2026 edition) – world rank range: 701–800. 1st place among Polish technical universities.
- CWTS Leiden Ranking (2025 edition) – global ranking: 500th place.
  CWTS Leiden Ranking Open Edition (2025 edition) – 1st place in Poland according to the scientific impact indicator – the top 1% most frequently cited in Mathematics and computer science, 3rd place in Poland according to the scientific impact indicator – the top 1% most frequently cited in Physical sciences and engineering.
- University Ranking by Academic Performance, URAP (2025–2026 edition) – world rank: 703. URAP by field rankings (2024–2025 edition): Metallurgy Engineering – rank: 59, Energy & Fuels – rank: 195, Mechanical Engineering – rank: 210, Chemical Engineering – rank: 248, Materials Engineering – rank: 278, Physical Sciences – rank: 295
- GRAS Global Ranking of Academic Subjects, developed by the team preparing the so-called "Shanghai Ranking" (2025 edition):
  Mining & Mineral Engineering – rank 37
  Metallurgical Engineering – rank range 51–75,
  Mathematics – rank range 101–150
  Physics – rank range 151–200,
  Instruments Science & Technology – rank range 151–200,
  Artificial Intelligence – rank range 201–300.
- THE Times Higher Education World University Ranking by subject (2026 edition): Computer Science – rank range: 601–800, Business and Economics – rank range: 601–800, Engineering – rank range: 801–1000, Physical Sciences – rank range: 801–1000, Social Sciences – rank range: 801–1000.

== Research University ==
In 2019, the AGH University received the title of a research university. The laureates of the project titled Initiative for Excellence – Research University, launched by the Polish Ministry of Science and Education, are the 10 best Polish higher education institutions.

== Accreditations ==
=== ABET accreditation ===
In 2017, the first- and second-cycle Mechatronic Engineering programmes of study at the AGH University Faculty of Mechanical Engineering and Robotics, with English as the language of instruction, received ABET accreditation. The AGH University was able to obtain accreditation as the first university in Poland and one of a few in Europe.

=== ENAEE accreditation ===
Four first- and second-cycle programmes of study at the AGH University received accreditation from the European Network for Accreditation of Engineering Education, namely, Mining Engineering at the Faculty of Civil Engineering and Resource Management, Technical Computer Science, Materials Engineering, and Metallurgy at the Faculty of Metals Engineering and Industrial Computer Science.

== International cooperation ==
The AGH University has concluded more than 280 general agreements on cooperation with higher education institutions around the world. The AGH University has partners in more than 60 countries.

The AGH University participates in international programmes, such as Erasmus+, Erasmus Mundus Joint Doctorate (EMJD), SMILE, CEEPUS, T.I.M.E., VULCANUS in Japan, HUSTEP, SIT, NAWA, and Spinaker.

The AGH University is a member of the following international organisations: ACRU, EUA, IAU, SEFI, AEUA, KMM-VIN AISBL, C-MAC NSU NPO, T.I.M.E., Magalhaes Network, EIT InnoEnergy, CEEPUS, UNIVERSEH (the European Space University for Earth and Humanity), IROs Forum, SPIRE, and UN Global Compact.

== Business cooperation ==
Cooperation with the economic sector, higher education institutions, and research institutes, as well as participation in Polish and international scientific and industrial consortia allows the AGH University to carry out numerous projects and implement them to the market. Annually, the AGH University concludes about 100 contracts, letters of intent, and agreements on cooperation with industry, central administration, and business environment institutions. Additionally, the AGH University implements about 1,000 research and development contracts annually, among which more than 75% are commissioned by industry.

The research and innovation activities of AGH University of Science and Technology are supported by its intellectual property portfolio, which includes patents, trademarks, utility models, and the expertise of its researchers and students. The university obtains several dozen patents annually and grants a comparable number of licences.

== Campus ==
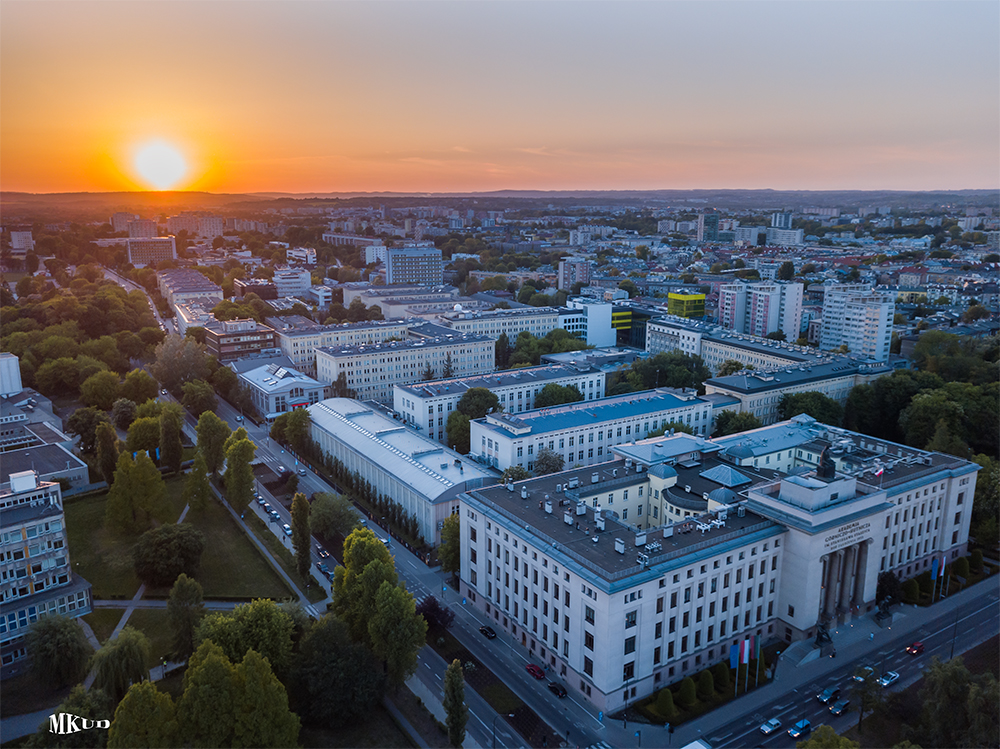
AGH University Campus

The AGH University Campus is located in the centre of Krakow. All teaching facilities, seats of faculties, administration, and student organisations, as well as the largest in Poland AGH University Student Campus, together with student clubs and sports and recreation facilities constitute a compact 40-hectare hub.

The Main Building (A-0) was erected between 1923 and 1935. The winning building design was presented at a competition organised in 1913 and won by an architect from Krakow – Sławomir Odrzywolski. After the First World War, the project served as a starting point, and Wacław Krzyżanowski was asked to cooperate thereon; he designed the façade and the interior of the building. The monumental edifice serves as a perfect example of academic classicism in Poland, in style during the 1920s. Currently, the building houses the AGH University's central authorities and administration, the Faculty of Geology, Geophysics, and Environmental Protection, and the Geological Museum.

With the development of the AGH University after the war, the campus began to grow. A prospective construction plan of the AGH University, aimed at expanding its premises, was initiated by Professor Walery Goetel and continued throughout the following decades.

In 1964, construction of the student campus began. To date, it remains the largest academic settlement of this kind in Poland. Its designer was Professor Tomasz Mańkowski. Until the end of 1979, 21 student dormitories were erected.

The beginning of the 21st century marks an intense expansion of the entire campus. More than a dozen modern buildings were constructed, and the numerous existing ones have been extended or modernised.

=== AGH University Main Library ===
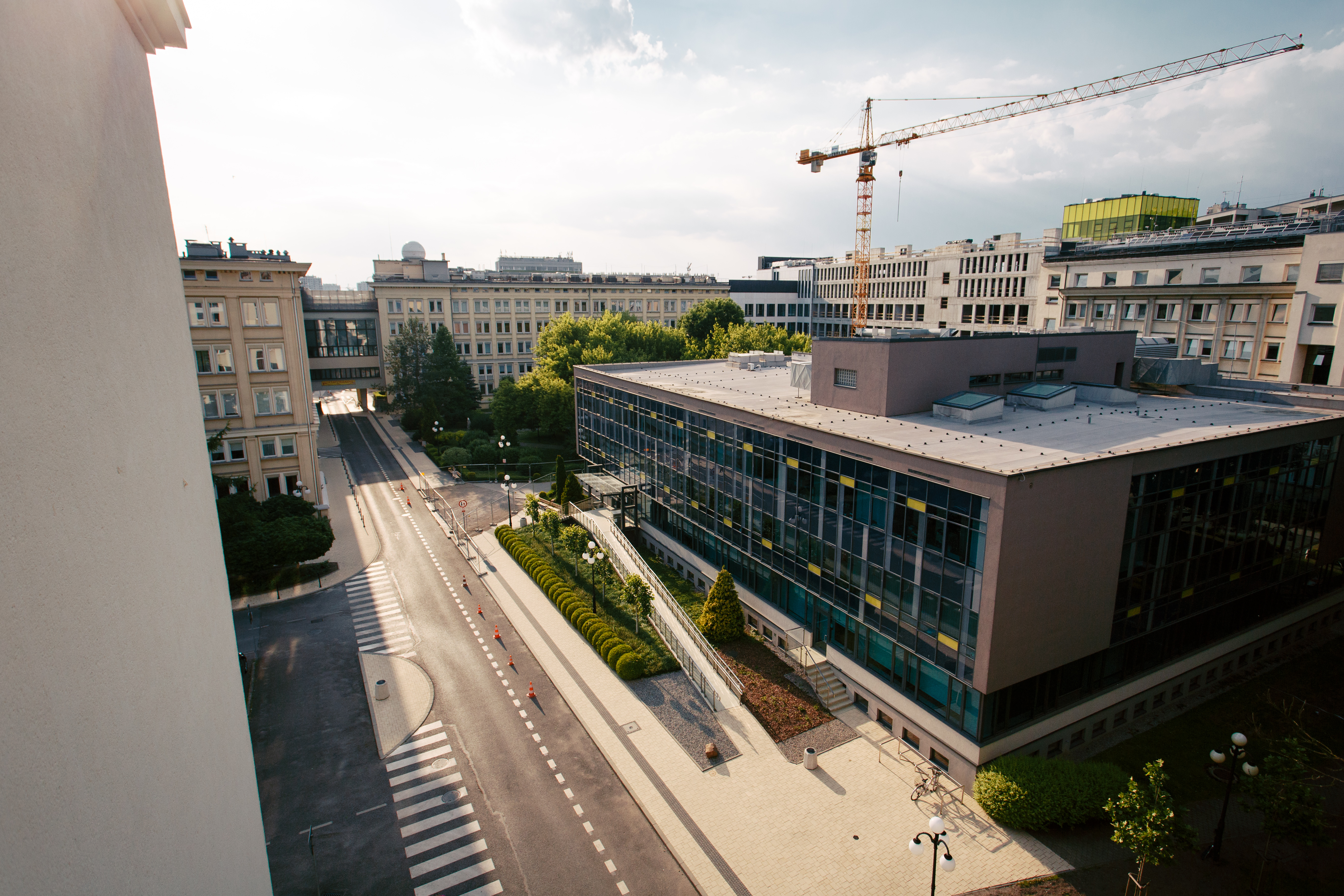
AGH University Main Library

The Main Library of AGH University is the largest technical library in Krakow and one of the largest in Poland.

The library was established in the academic year 1921–22 and its initial loci were 18 Loretańska Street and subsequently 7 Smoleńsk Street. In 1929, the library collection was transferred to a room within the newly built main building of the Mining Academy at 30 Mickiewicza Avenue. In 1938, the book collection amounted to more than 17,000 volumes. During World War II, the collection was deposited at the Jagiellonian Library. Despite the prohibition introduced by the General Government administration, the books were secretly lent out to MA students and employees. After the war, the collection, reduced by 25%, returned to the main building of the academy.

In 1966, a new free-standing library building was opened, erected due to the efforts of Władysław Piasecki, the library head. Since then, the library has begun to develop dynamically. As a result of launching new programmes of study at the Mining Academy, the library's book collection grew and its thematic scope broadened.

In the 1990s, the library underwent digitalisation. Between 1996 and 1999, the interior was renovated and in 2010, the façade of the main library building was modernised, and the decision was taken to expand it and completely remodel it. The modernised building was made available in 2014.

Currently, the library collection has more than 900,000 volumes including books, journals, and special items. Furthermore, the library's collection, in addition to printed materials, also includes access to Polish and foreign databases, online journals and e-books.

=== Laboratories ===
The AGH University has more than 800 laboratories equipped with state-of-the-art apparatus, including the transmission electron microscope Titan Cubed G-2 60-300, devices requiring the so-called clean room conditions, nanotechnology and material nanodiagnostics equipment, a computed tomography scanner to study construction materials, an electron microprobe Jeol SuperProbe JXA-8230 that facilitates the determination of elemental contents from boron to uranium in all kinds of solid substances, mass spectrometers, diffractometers, 3D printers for prototype creation, numerous appliances for environmental tests, microscopes for microstructure parameter analyses and measurements, as well as various types of laboratory installations (including a fully functional production line in the Industry 4.0 Laboratory or a singing Tesla coil in the High Voltage Laboratory). The AGH University has one of the quietest places in Poland – an anechoic chamber, as well as the Experimental Mine, which is unique in Poland and one of the few such research and educational laboratories in Europe, and also serves as a museum.

=== Green areas and an outdoor gallery ===
The green spaces and garden squares of the campus constitute an outdoor gallery. It features, for example, sculptures of Bronisław Chromy, a Krakow artist, sculptures of students from the Faculty of Sculpture of the Jan Matejko Academy of Fine Arts in Krakow, as well as natural creations – glacial erratics. Moreover, campus premises abound in industrial machines related to the development of technological thought and research activity of respective faculties.

=== AGH University Student Campus ===
The Miasteczko Studenckie AGH, which spans about 13 ha, is an integral part of the AGH University campus and remains the largest student settlement in Poland. The 20 student houses offer more than 7,500 beds to students.

The campus comprises student clubs, a swimming pool with a gym and bowling alley, and sports fields.

Student clubs:

- Academic Cultural Centre, Klub STUDIO – one of the largest concert clubs in Poland
- Klub Zaścianek
- Klub Gwarek
- Klub Filutek

== History ==
=== Efforts to establish the Mining Academy ===
The efforts to establish a Polish mining school in Krakow and to appoint suitable teaching staff began in the second half of the 19th century and intensified when Galicia gained autonomy in 1860. This endeavour involved Polish engineers – miners and metallurgists, Galician representatives, and Krakow authorities. Concentrated diplomatic action was taken in Vienna to win the favour of the Austrian government.

At the beginning of the 20th century, a group of prominent engineers and mining activists, led by engineer Jan Zarański, went to great lengths to obtain approval for establishing a higher education institution in Krakow to educate mining engineers. These efforts were successful, and on 10 July 1912, Krakow authorities received a permit to open an academy.

=== 1913 – institution of the Mining Academy ===
In April 1913, the Ministry of Civil Engineering in Vienna appointed the Organising Committee of the Mining Academy in Krakow, chaired by Professor Józef Morozewicz.

The document that confirmed the establishment of a higher school of mining in Krakow was signed on 31 May 1913, by emperor Franz Joseph I of Austria.

The outbreak of World War I made it impossible to inaugurate the first academic year of the newly established academy in October 1914. The minutes from a conference at the President of Krakow, Juliusz Leo, contain a footnote related to the Mining Academy. A magistrate official, probably reorganising documents, wrote an additional note at the bottom of one of them that said: ‘Due to the outbreak of war, the Mining Academy was not opened, the whole matter being postponed to more peaceful times, 21st March 2015.’

=== 1919 – the opening of the academy ===
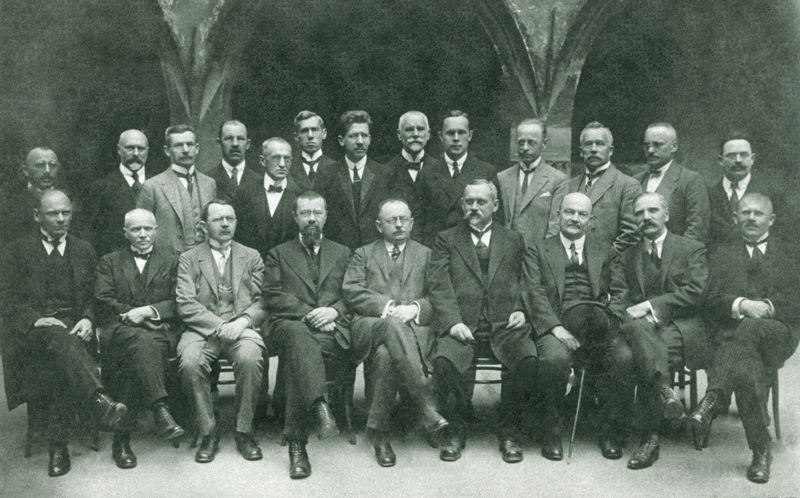
Group of professors and lecturers of the Mining Academy from the 1920s.

When Poland regained its independence in 1918, the Organising Committee of the Mining Academy in Krakow recommenced its work.

On 8 April 1919, the Council of Ministers put forward an official motion to establish and open the Mining Academy in Krakow. On 1 May 1919, the first six professors of the Mining Academy were appointed.

On 20 October 1919, Józef Piłsudski officiated a celebratory inauguration of the Mining Academy in the main hall of the Jagiellonian University.

=== Polish-Soviet War ===
Students of the Mining Academy took active part in the Polish-Soviet war in 1920. These events were described by Professor Antoni Hoborski: 'our youth submitted to voluntary conscription, which I witnessed; then, on the 19th day of July 1920, they all went to their camps (only 6 were deemed unfit for military service)’.

=== Development in the interwar period ===
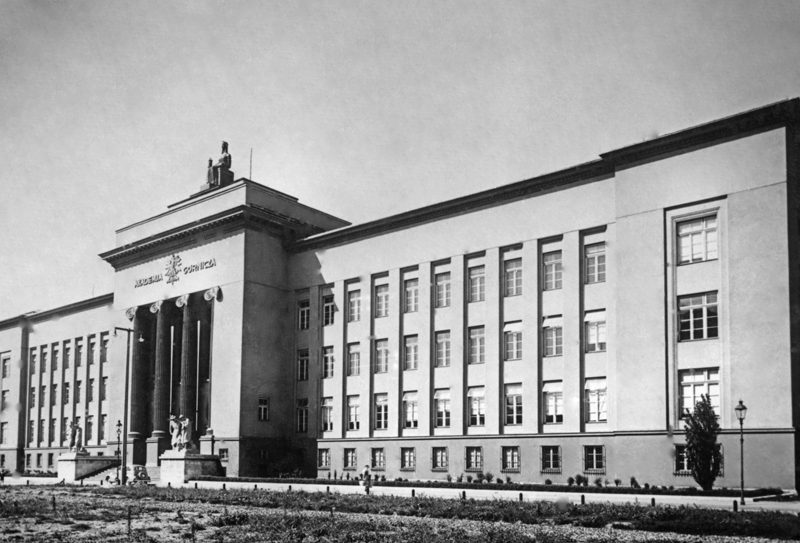
Mining Academy building with the original statue of St. Barbara on top, placed there on 24 August 1939

On 15 June 1923, with the participation of the contemporary President of the Republic of Poland, Stanisław Wojciechowski, and numerous representatives of the world of science and mining industry, the cornerstone of the new main building of the academy was laid.

In 1925, the design of the Mining Academy emblem was created. It had the initials B.T. (Bogdan Treter) on it. It was probably approved by the General Assembly of Professors.

From September 1929 to March 1930, the main building was gradually filled with departments and central administration of the academy. In 1935, the building was officially and ceremonially blessed.

The academy has achieved a quality level of education, assuming its place among contemporary mining schools in Europe. Moreover, since its inauguration, the academy has cooperated closely with industry, according to its resources and capabilities, and maintained connections with the Polish economy.

The Main Building of the Mining Academy assumed its final shape shortly before the outbreak of World War II. The construction is a perfect example of academic classicism, in style in the 1920s in Poland, which constitutes a manifestation of the power and might of the reborn Polish state. The façade decoration was complemented by monumental statues of miners and metallurgists. The figures were made in 1935 by the sculptor Jan Raszka. On 24 August 1939, the top of the building was crowned with the statue of Saint Barbara made by Stefan Zbigniewicz.

At its two faculties, the Faculty of Mining and the Faculty of Metallurgy, in the interwar period, the Mining Academy had educated 792 engineers, many of whom later held high positions in Polish industry and higher education.

=== World War II ===
The Nazi German invasion of Poland in September 1939 brought the AGH University to a halt. On 6 September, Krakow was seized by German troops. They began to loot and plunder the AGH University property, and reorganise the Main Building of the Mining Academy to house the Regierung des Generalgouvernements (General Government administration). In 1940, the statue of Saint Barbara was thrown off the top of the main building and shattered to pieces.

==== Sonderaktion Krakau ====
On 6 September 1939, a general assembly of Jagiellonian University professors was called to inform them about the policy of German authorities on science and education. On this day at noon, in room 66 of the JU Collegium Novum, professors and lecturers gathered numerously. The building was surrounded by the Gestapo and the meeting participants were arrested. Among the detainees were also Mining Academy professors who had attended another meeting in the boardroom of the JU Faculty of Philosophy. 183 people were imprisoned, among them professors, associate professors, and assistants from both universities, as well as many other people outside the academic community.

The arrested were detained at the prison at Montelupich Street in Krakow and subsequently transferred to the barracks at Mazowiecka Street. Later, they were transported to a prison in Wrocław and finally to the concentration camp in Sachsenhausen.

The concentration camp took the lives of the following:

- Professor Antoni Hoborski – first Mining Academy rector (1920–1922),
- Professor Władysław Takliński – Mining Academy rector (1933–1939),
- Antoni Meyer, DSc – head of the MA Faculty of Mining Department of Legal Theory (1932–1939).

Others who remained in the camp were Andrzej Bolewski, Stanisław Gołąb, and Julian Kamecki. They were transported to the concentration camp in Dachau and released only in the last quarter of 1940. Releasing the professors was possible due to a united protest action of world scientific communities.

==== Mining Academy employees as victims of the Katyn massacre ====
Among the victims murdered by the NKVD on the territory of the Soviet Union between April and May 1940 were three Mining Academy employees:

- Zygmunt Mitera, DSc – Assistant Professor at the Faculty of Mining (murdered in the so-called Kharkov camp),
- Tadeusz Ramza, Eng – Senior Teaching Assistant at the Faculty of Mining (shot in the back of the head during the liquidation of the prison camp of Polish officers in Starobielsk),
- Augustyn Jelonek – Assistant Professor at the Faculty of Metallurgy (shot in the back of the head during the liquidation of the prison camp of Polish officers in Starobielsk).

Forced by the Germans, but with the consent of the Polish government in London and the Polish Underground State, in 1943, more than a dozen Poles went to Katyn, including the writer Ferdynand Goetel (secretary of the Mining Academy between 1920 and 1925, brother of Professor Walery Goetel). The committees corroborated that the massacre of Polish officers was executed by the Soviets. After the war, Ferdynand Goetel was to the Soviets one of the most inconvenient witnesses of the Katyn massacre.

==== Education during the war ====
Thanks to the generosity and dedication of the Mining Academy employees, the collection of the MA Main Library was safely deposited in the Jagiellonian Library. Academy activities had to go underground, and the governance attempted to reclaim or establish makeshift teaching venues and educational materials.

With the consent of the occupier, in 1940, a State School of Mining, Metallurgy, and Measurement (Staatlische Fachschule für Berg- Hütten- und Vermessungwesen) was established with Polish as the language of instruction. Professor Walery Goetel took the position of the head teacher; other professors from the closed Mining Academy became teachers. Both professors and assistants were also involved in underground education, lecturing, and teaching classes for academic students. During the underground schooling action, 278 examinations and 16 diploma exams took place.

=== After World War II ===
In 1947, by virtue of an important resolution, the academy was renamed Academy of Mining and Metallurgy (Polish: Akademia Górniczo-Hutnicza, AGH). Formal approval of this change by the central authorities came only in 1949.

Professor Walery Goetel, who promoted a far-reaching development plan, initiated the expansion of the academy. His plan was carried out and implemented in the following decades. During the authoritarian times of the Polish People's Republic (Polish: Polska Republika Ludowa, PRL), the academic and educational profile of the academy was adjusted to the needs of industry, and the AGH University itself thrived, as no other higher education institution at that time.

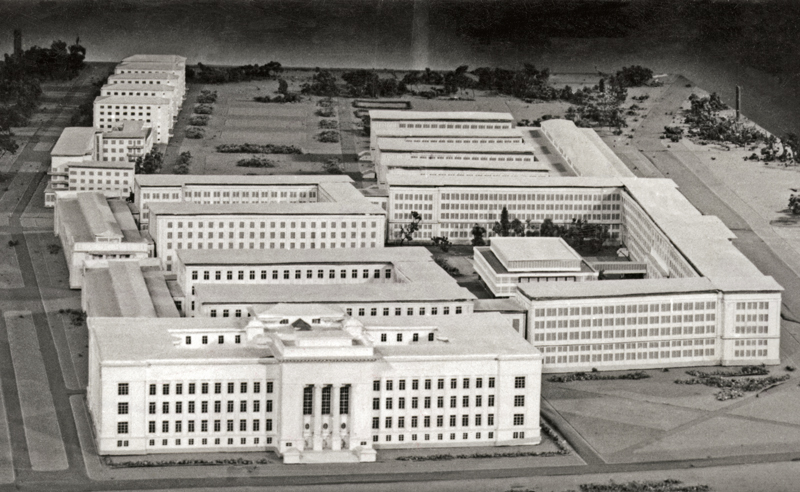
Model of the Academy of Mining and Metallurgy extended in the post-war years

In 1969, the academy received a patron – Stanisław Staszic. It was also when the academy obtained its banner.

On 14 December 1981, the AGH academic community, under the banner of the 'Solidarity' Movement, took a stand and protested against suppressing – by introducing martial law – the newly acquired sense of freedom and fellowship. The AGH NSZZ 'Solidarity' was an academic organisation, the only one in Krakow and one of three in the country, that organised sit-down strikes in the first days of the martial law.

Since the 1990s, the academy has been developing programmes of study that chart out technological advancement, such as control engineering and robotics, computer science, electronics and telecommunications, biomedical engineering, and mechatronics.

In 1999, the top of the AGH Main Building was once again crowned with a reconstructed statue of Saint Barbara, made by Jan Siek. The figure was blessed on 17 June 1999, by pope John Paul II during his sixth pilgrimage to Poland (5–17 June 1999).

In relation to a debate on the change of the academy name in 2003, it has been decided that the English translation of the name will be: AGH University of Science and Technology. However, there are many documents, books, research papers etc. in English that still use the literal translation of the AGH University name in Polish.

In the academic year 2006–2007, the AGH UST implemented a new Visual Identity System, including a new sign identifying the AGH University.

In 2023, the AGH University Senate decided that the name AGH University of Science and Technology (AGH UST) will be changed into AGH University of Krakow (AGH University).

In the 21st century, the AGH University has experienced extensive expansion. The campus premises have gained more than a dozen new buildings, and numerous existing objects have been modernised.

== University symbols ==
=== Emblem ===
The AGH University emblem shows a stylised eagle with a crown, head turned right, and a shield with Hammer and Pick (symbol of mining), as well as AGH University initials.

The present version of the emblem was designed on the basis of a drawing made in 1925 by Bogdan Treter. The AGH University emblem ought to be used exclusively to promote the history and scientific legacy of the AGH University.

=== Graphic symbol ===
The AGH University graphic symbol is the only sign used for everyday visual identification of the AGH University. It has replaced the AGH University emblem in this role. The ideogram represents a stylised eagle, which is an allusion to the AGH University emblem. In its coloured version, the ideogram has three colours.

=== Colors ===
AGH University colors are green, black and red in reference to the tradition of mining and metallurgy. Green being a symbol of nature, black symbolizing mines, prudence and wisdom and red being a symbol of fire and molten iron.

== Traditions ==
=== Mining Ceremonies ===
Barbórka (English: St. Barbara's day) is a mining holiday, deeply embedded in the AGH University tradition, drawing on the customs of old Austrian mining schools, which were transplanted onto the Krakow soil by the AGH University professors. Each year, on 4 December, Pochód lisów (English: March of the Foxes) – a mining procession parades through the streets of Krakow. 'Foxes' are newly admitted students who enter the mining tribe. On this day, in St. Anna's Collegiate Church a ceremonial mass is said. The highlight of the celebration is held in the Assembly Hall. Subsequently, in the Main Hall, the traditional skok przez skórę (English: leather jump) takes place, which consists in jumping over the miner's apron (a short leather apron traditionally worn to protect the miners' clothing as they sat or knelt while working). For first-year mining and geology students, the jump constitutes a rite of acceptance as a miner. The celebration is accompanied by the recurrent Mining Division Student Research Clubs Conference and the International Exhibition and Trade Fair of Minerals, Fossils, and Jewellery. The culmination of the celebration is the annual meeting of the gwarki (English: guilds).

=== Metallurgy Ceremonies ===
Another remarkable celebration held at the AGH University is the Metallurgist's Day. The way in which it is celebrated is very similar to the mining ceremonies. The event takes place annually in May, and in addition to the official ceremonies in the Assembly Hall, the programme includes, among other things, the Metallurgy Division Student Research Clubs Conference and an academic conference. Metallurgical traditions, which are nurtured at the AGH University, include the Metallurgist's Vowing ceremony, which takes place in the Main Hall of the AGH University Main Building. Traditionally, the celebration is accompanied by a meeting of academic staff and students during the so-called karczma hutnicza (English: metallurgy tavern).

=== Hoborski Science Days ===
Each year, in October, the AGH University holds Science Holidays – better known as Hoborski Science Days. The event aims to popularise science and its technical applications, simultaneously commemorating the figure of Professor Antoni Hoborski, a prominent Polish mathematician, the first rector of the Mining Academy.
