= Armii Krajowej Street =

Street in Kraków, Poland

Armii Krajowej street
Kraków
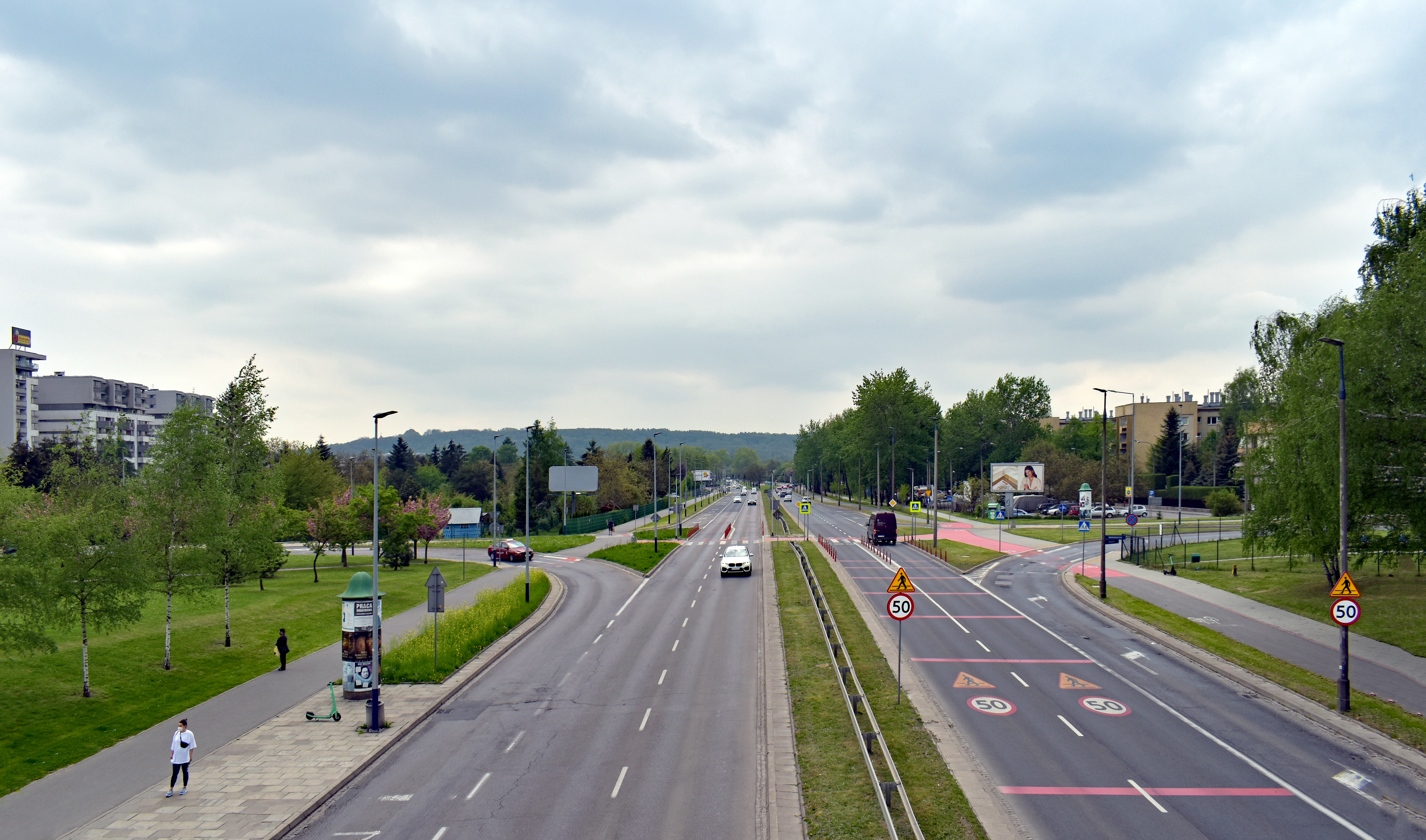
- View south from the viaduct onto Bronowicka Street. On the left: Salwator City, on the right Bronowice Nowe Estate
- Interactive map of Armii Krajowej street
- Part of: Kraków Bronowice, Krowodrza district
- Owner: City of Kraków
- Location: Kraków, Poland

Armii Krajowej Street is a street in Kraków running through districts Bronowice and Krowodrza, passing through Bronowice Małe and Łobzów.

The section from the Ofiar Katynia Roundabout to the dis tinctive "arc" of the street, where it changes direction from south to east, is part of the III Ring Road. Its total length is 2.8 km.

The current name of the street has been in use since 1991. Previous names include Fizyków Street (the section from Radzikowskiego Street to Bronowicka Street) and Ivana Konev Street (the section from Bronowicka Street to Piastowska Street). Between 1987 and 1991, a monument to Ivan Konev by Antoni Hajdecki was located on the street.

== Route ==
The street begins at Ofiar Katynia Roundabout. It then runs south, passing under railway viaducts and under Balicka Street, with which it is connected by three link roads. Two of these also provide access to Bronowicka Street. It is connected to Zarzecze and Stanisław Przybyszewski Streets via intersections with traffic lights. It ends at the intersection with Piastowska and Nawojki Streets.

== Public transport ==
Along the street, there are several bus stops served by Kraków's public transport system, as well as the Kraków Bronowice railway station, which handles agglomeration and regional trains.

== Future plans ==
There are plans to build a multi-level interchange and connect the street with the planned Balicka and Zwierzyniecka routes.

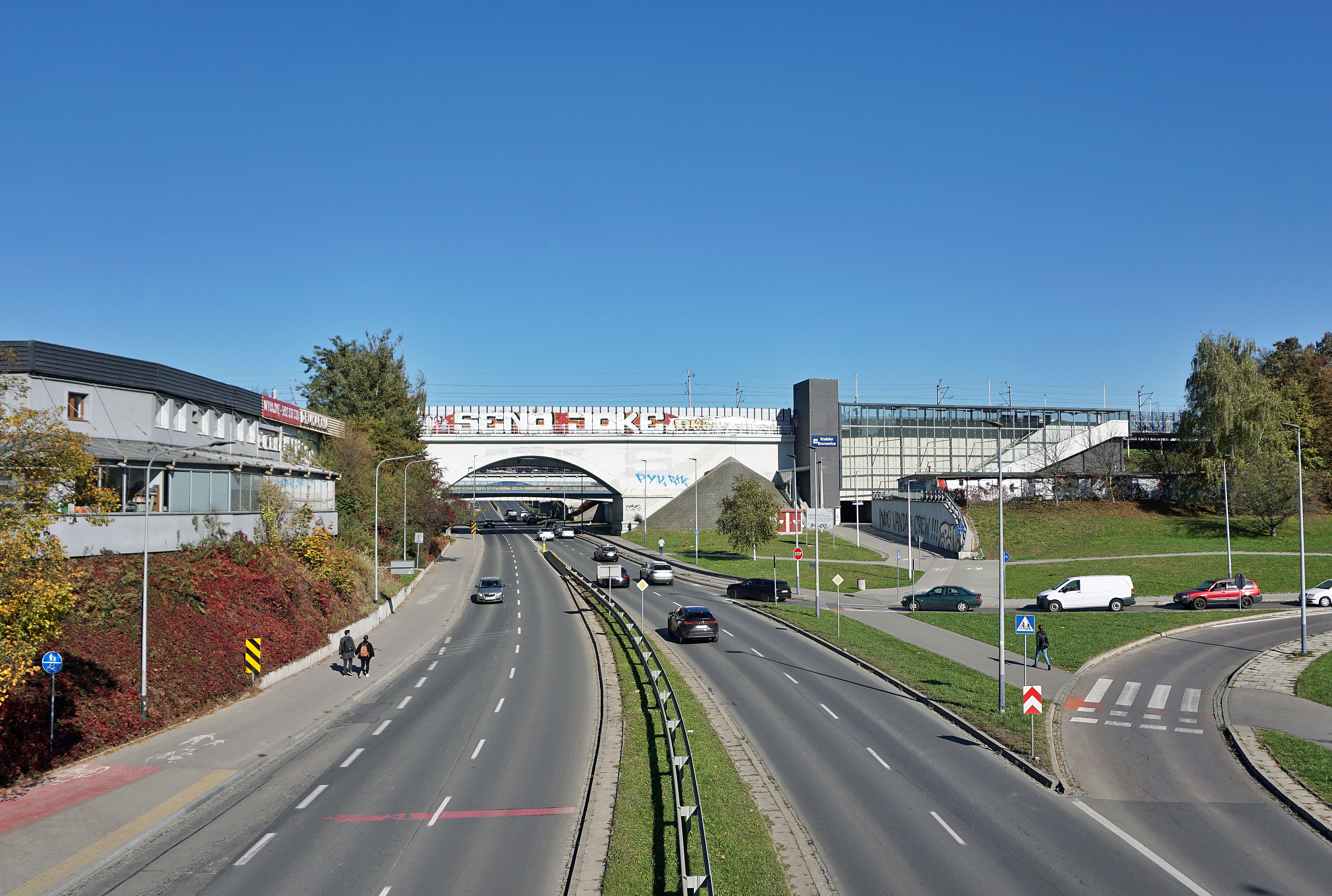
View north from the viaduct onto Bronowicka Street

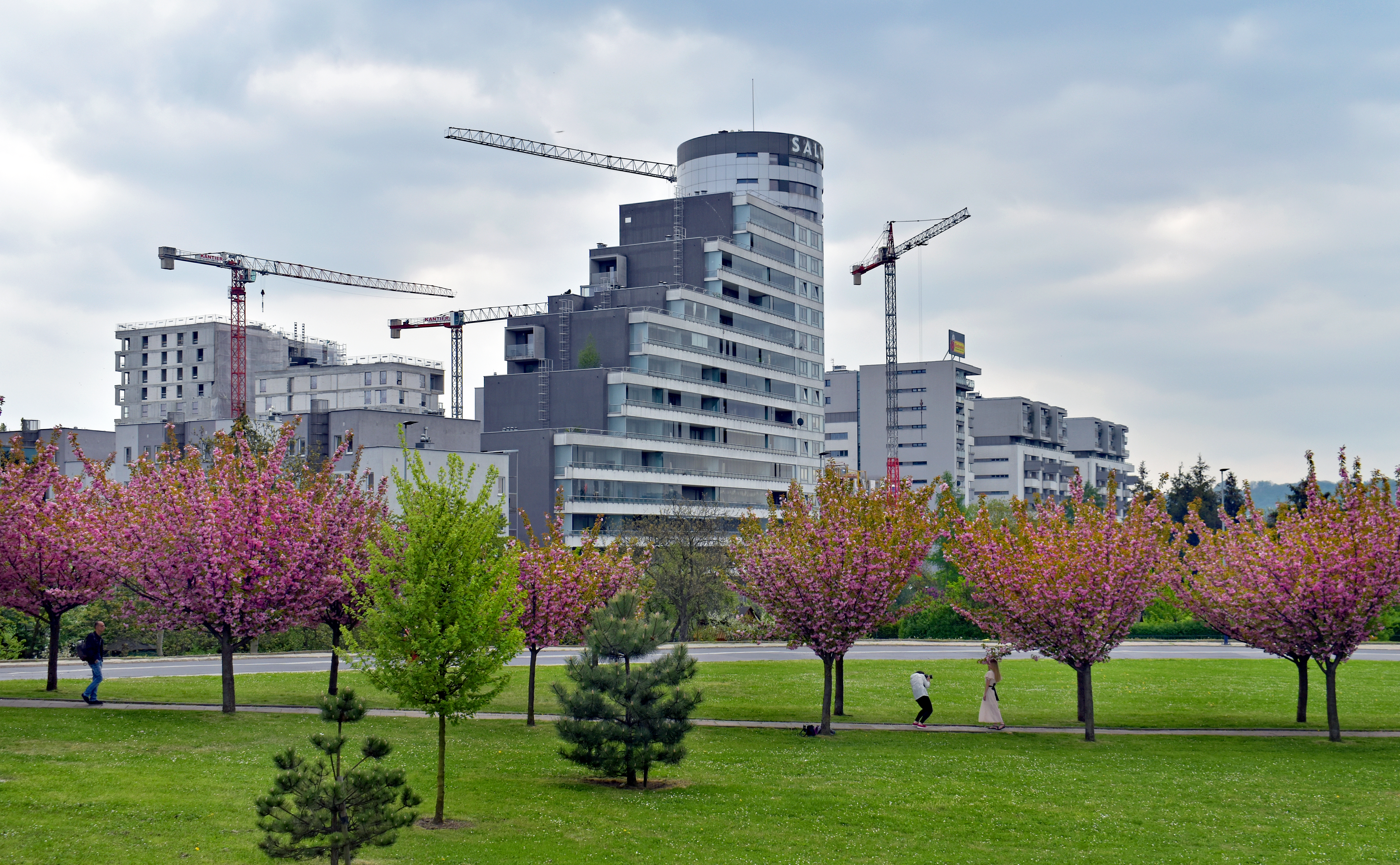
Salwator Tower, Salwator City and the "cherry alley" at the intersection with Bronowicka Street (2021)

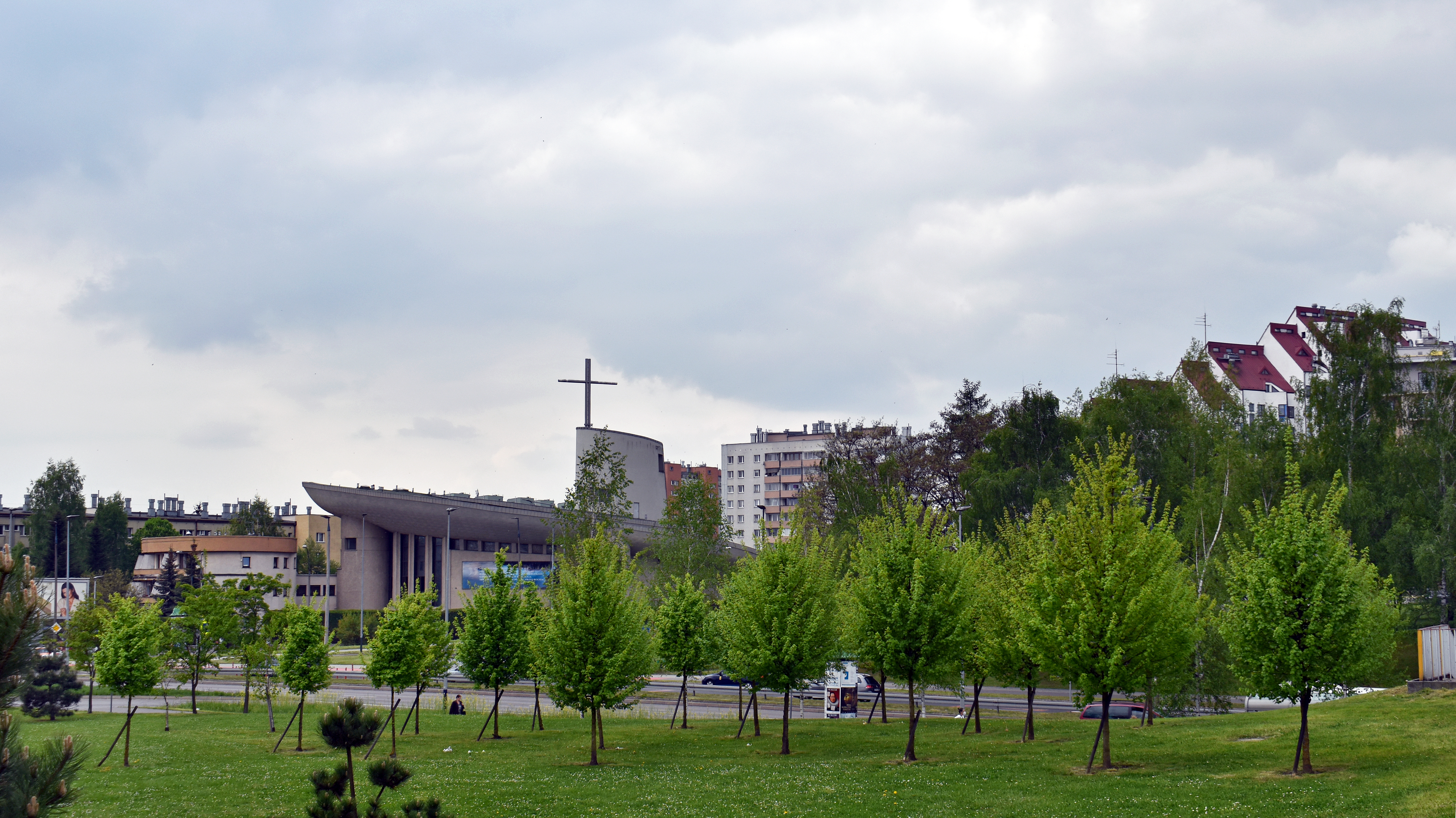
Street and Bronowice Nowe Estate (formerly Widok) and the Church of St. Jan Kanty

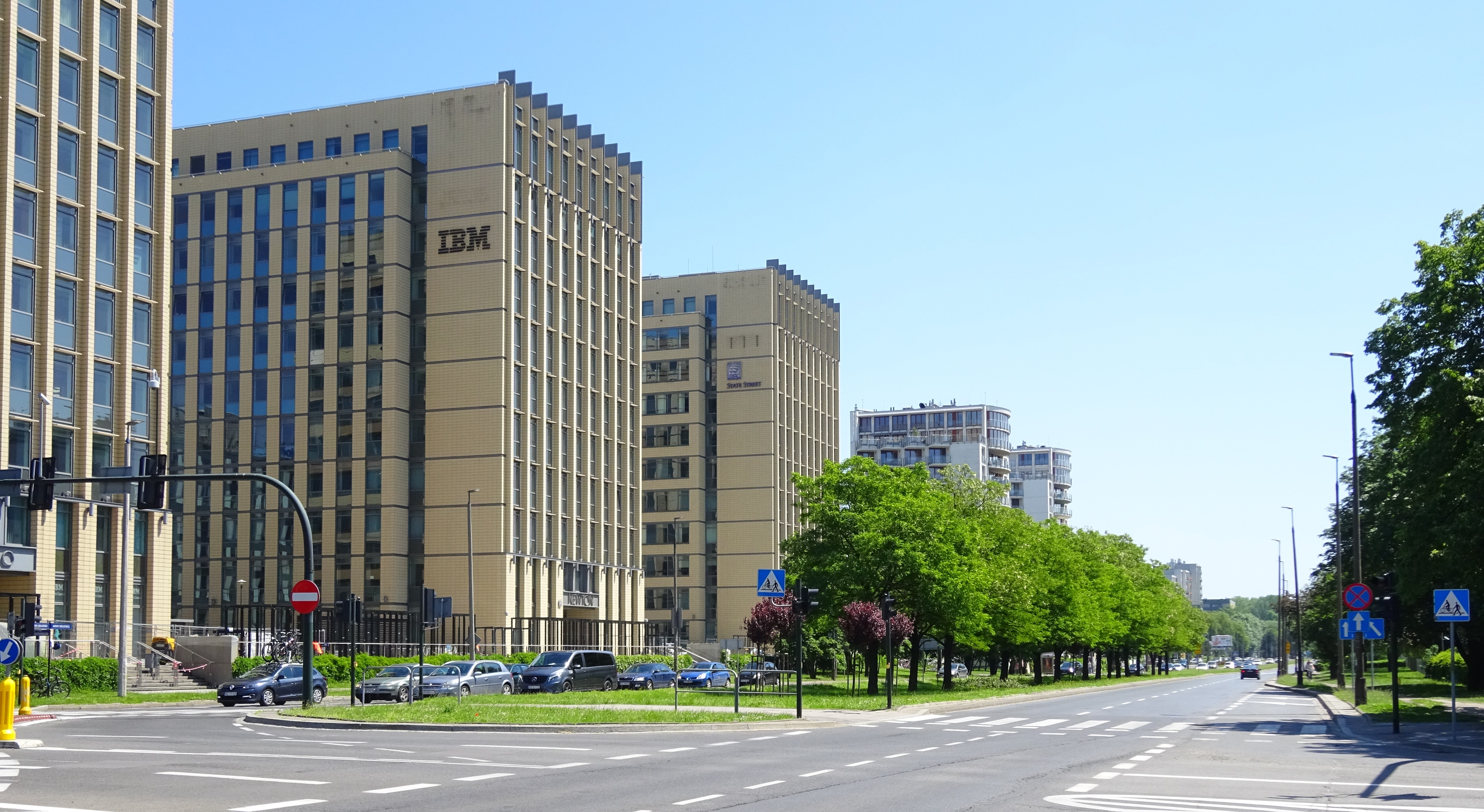
View from the intersection with Stanisław Przybyszewski Street to the east
