= Lucjan Rydel Street =

Street in Kraków, Poland

Lucjan Rydel street
Kraków
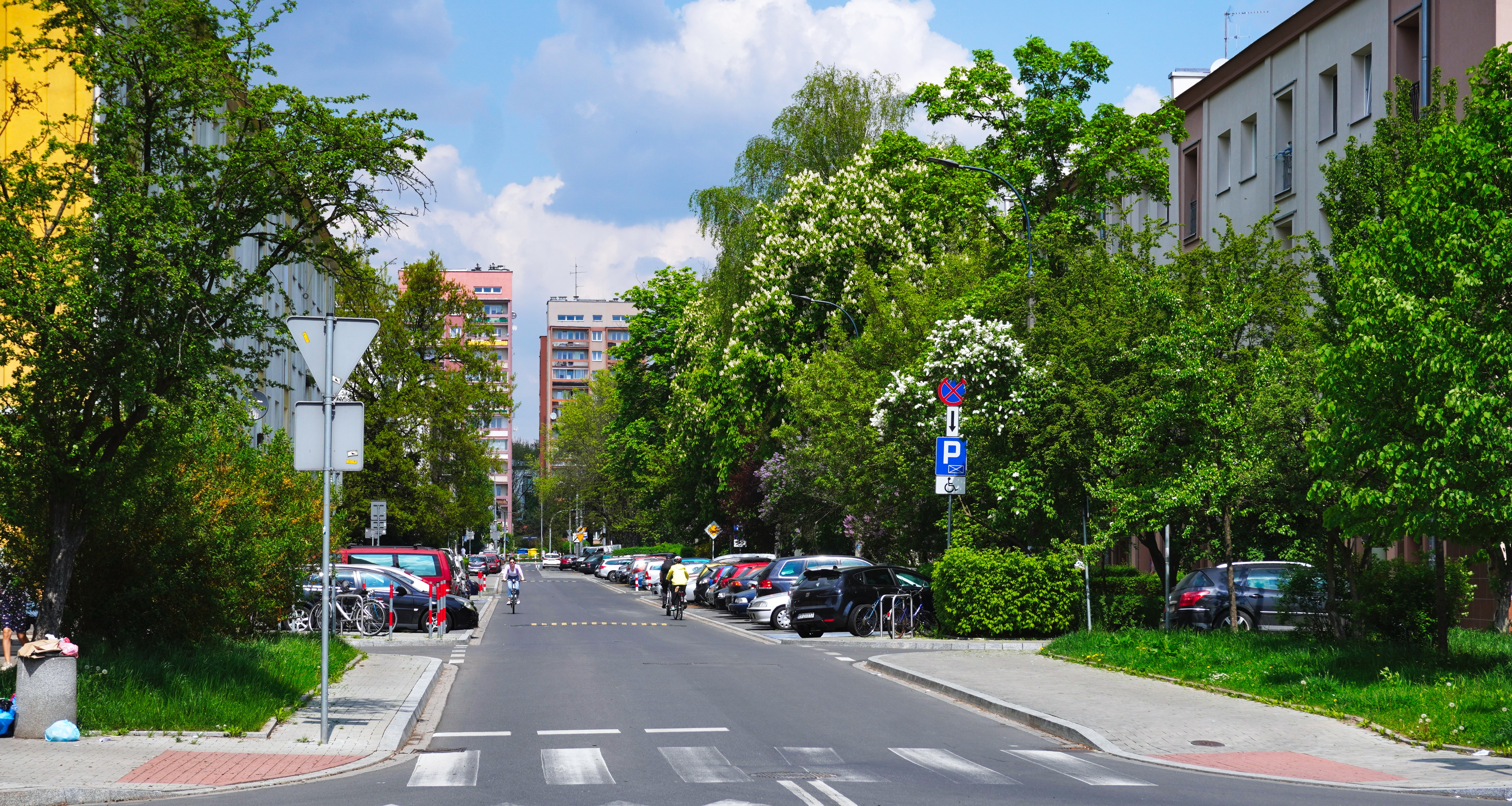
- View from the south, from the intersection with Jadwiga z Łobzowa Street
- Interactive map of Lucjan Rydel street
- Part of: Kraków Bronowice, Prądnik Biały district
- Owner: City of Kraków
- Location: Kraków, Poland

Lucjan Rydel Street is a street in Kraków, located in districts Bronowice and Prądnik Biały, running from the intersection with Jadwiga z Łobzowa Street in a north-easterly direction to the intersection with Walery Eljasz-Radzikowski Street.

It crosses Bronowicka Street and the railway line from Kraków towards Katowice and the Kraków John Paul II International Airport. Part of the street is shaped as a chestnut tree avenue.

== History ==
Historically, it was a boundary road between Bronowice Małe and Łobzów. Between 1857 and 1865, Fort Reditowy No. 7 Bronowice was built on the western side of the street. The street was named in 1933 after the poet associated with Bronowice – Lucjan Rydel.

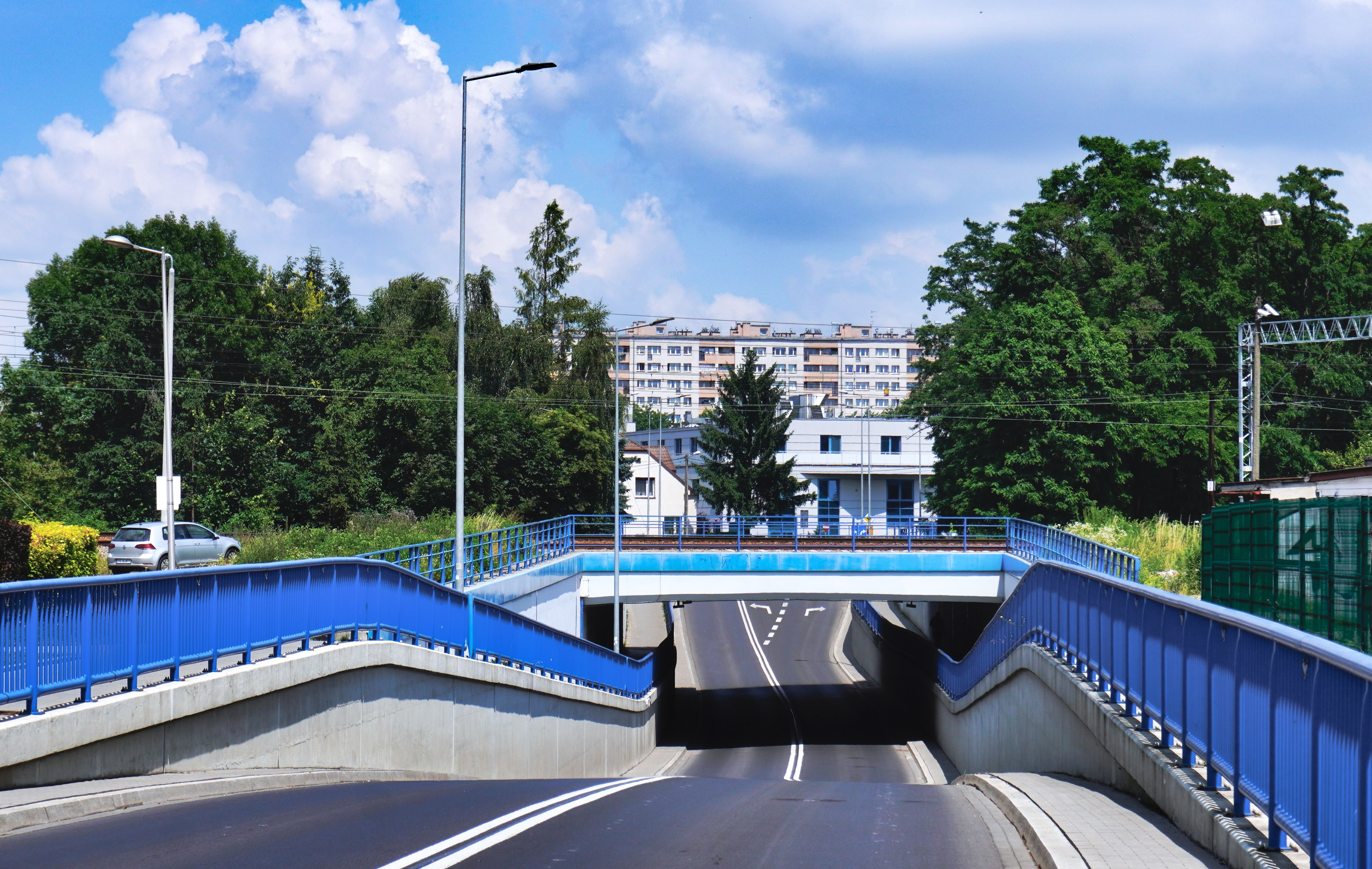
The northern part of the Lucjan Rydel Street, railway viaduct put into use in 2019, view to the north, Azory estate in the background

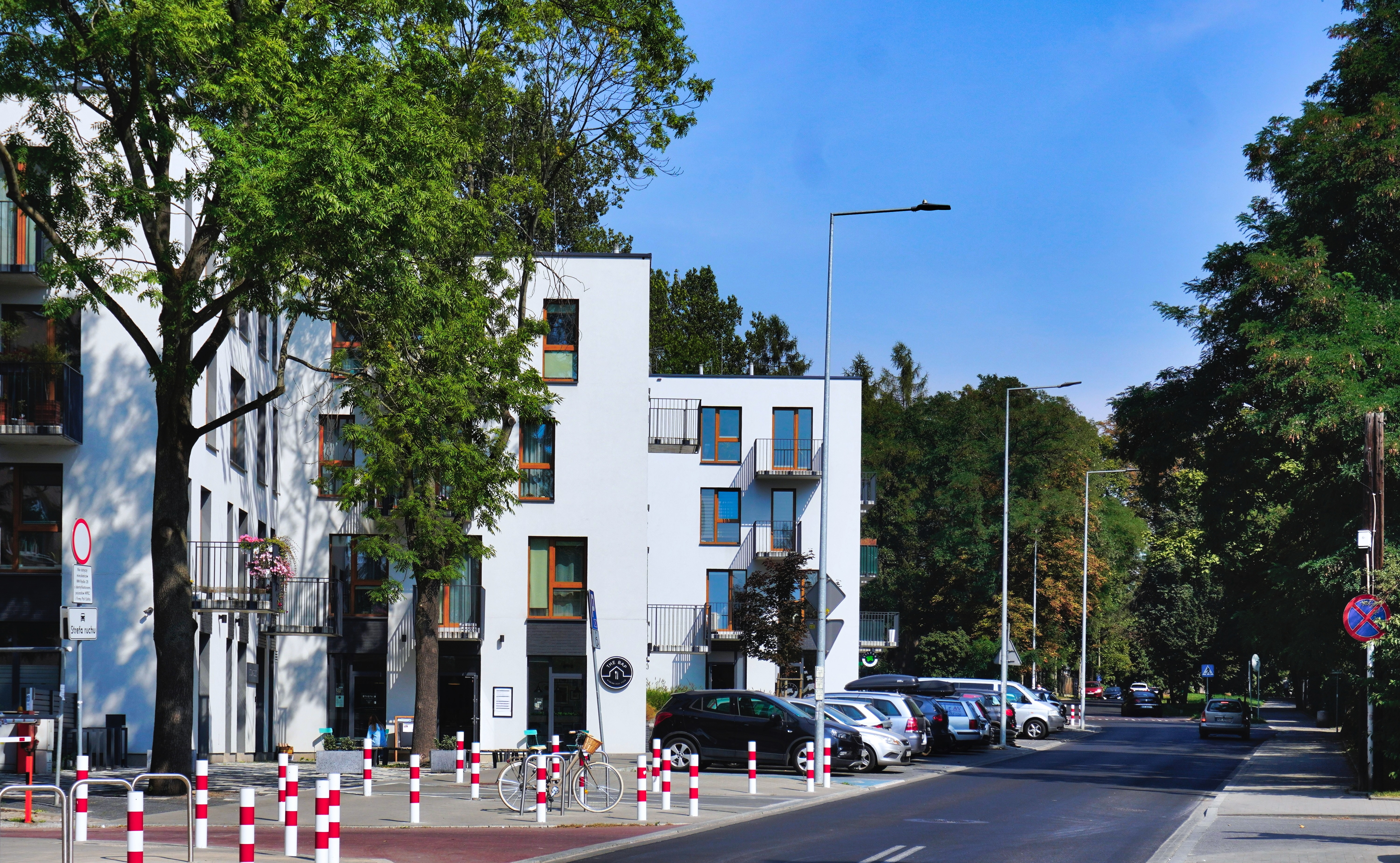
View from the intersection with Zaczarowane Koło Street north
