= Bronowicka Street =

Street in Kraków, Poland

Bronowicka street
Kraków
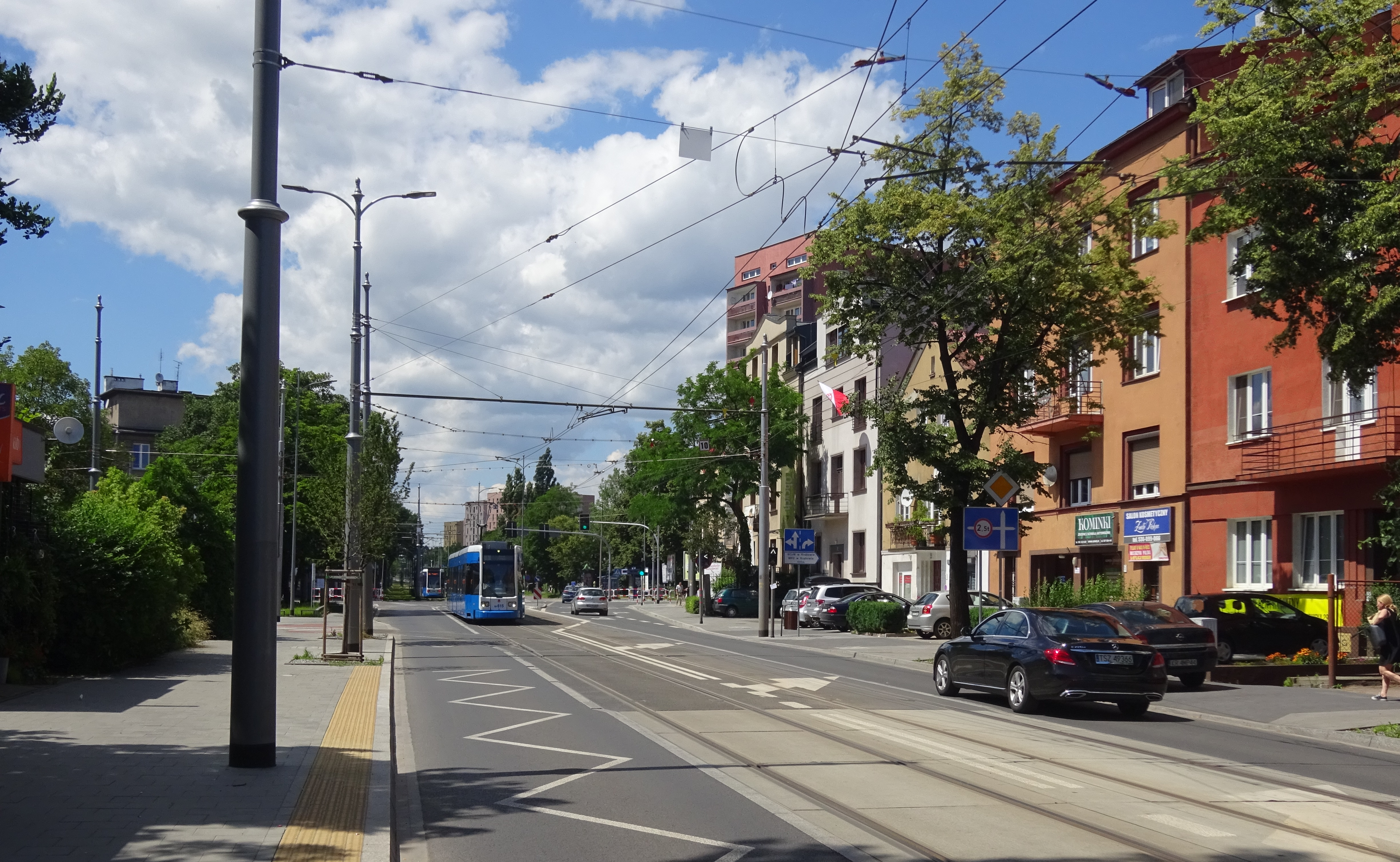
- View of the section between the intersections with Piastowska and Lucjan Rydel streets looking northwest
- Interactive map of Bronowicka street
- Part of: Kraków Bronowice district
- Owner: City of Kraków
- Location: Kraków, Poland

Bronowicka Street is a street in Kraków, in district Bronowice.

It connects Armii Krajowej Street and Balicka Street with Piastowska Street, Podchorążych Street, and Bartosz Głowacki Street.

In the 1940s, a tram track was built on a section of the street leading to a tram loop located at the intersection with Lucjan Rydel Street. In 1975, a tram track was constructed along the entire length of the street, culminating in a loop located near Balicka Street.

== History ==
- Around 1920 – the creation of a dirt road connecting Łobzów with Balice.
- Around 1930 – the street was named Bronowicka Street.
- Around 1980 – the construction of a junction at Armii Krajowej Street, shortening Bronowicka Street by approximately 100 meters.

== Important buildings and infrastructure element ==
- Bronowice tram loop
- Post office
- Former municipal school building at the corner of the intersection with Bartosz Głowacki Street, designed by Jan Zawiejski and built between 1913 and 1915.
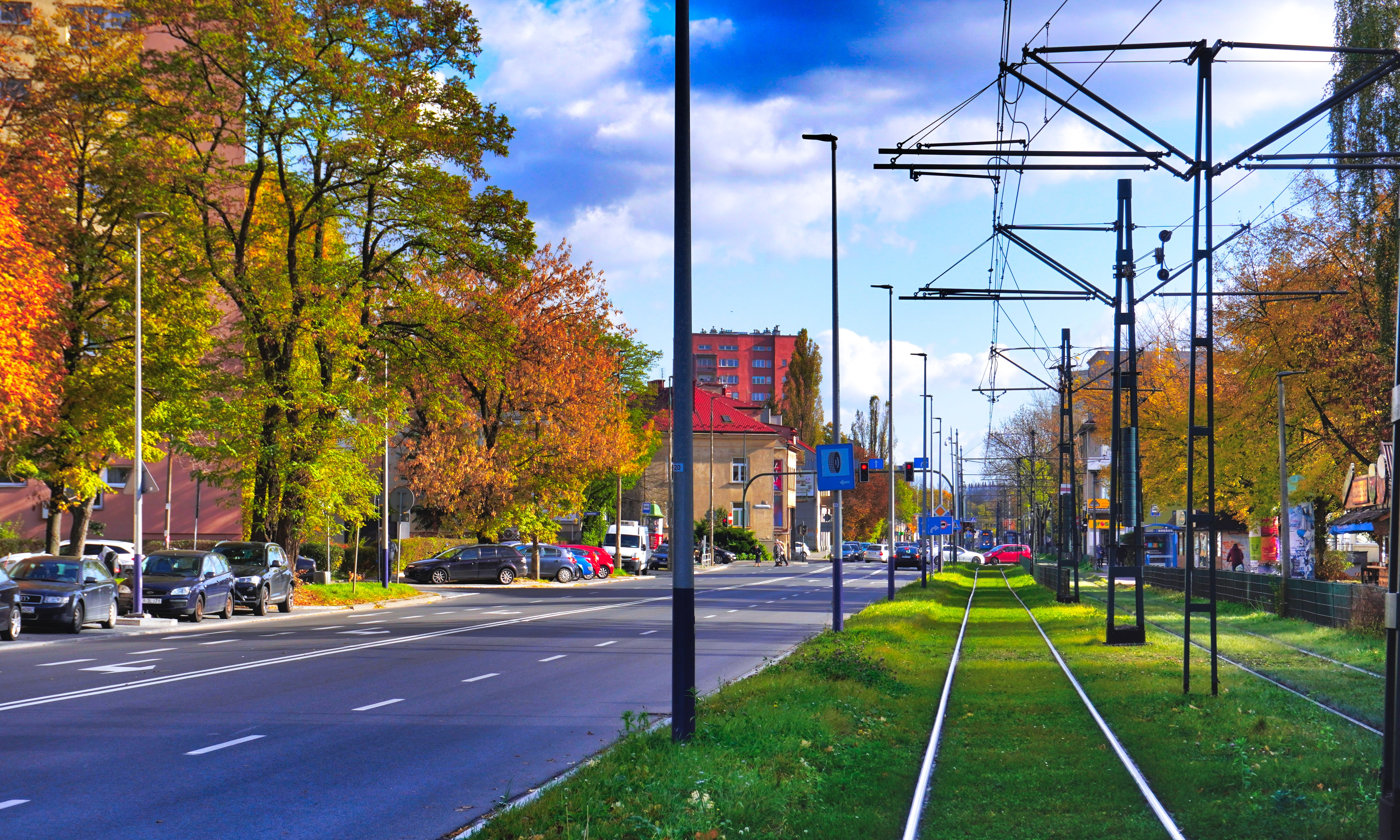
View from the intersection with Stańczyk Street to the southeast.

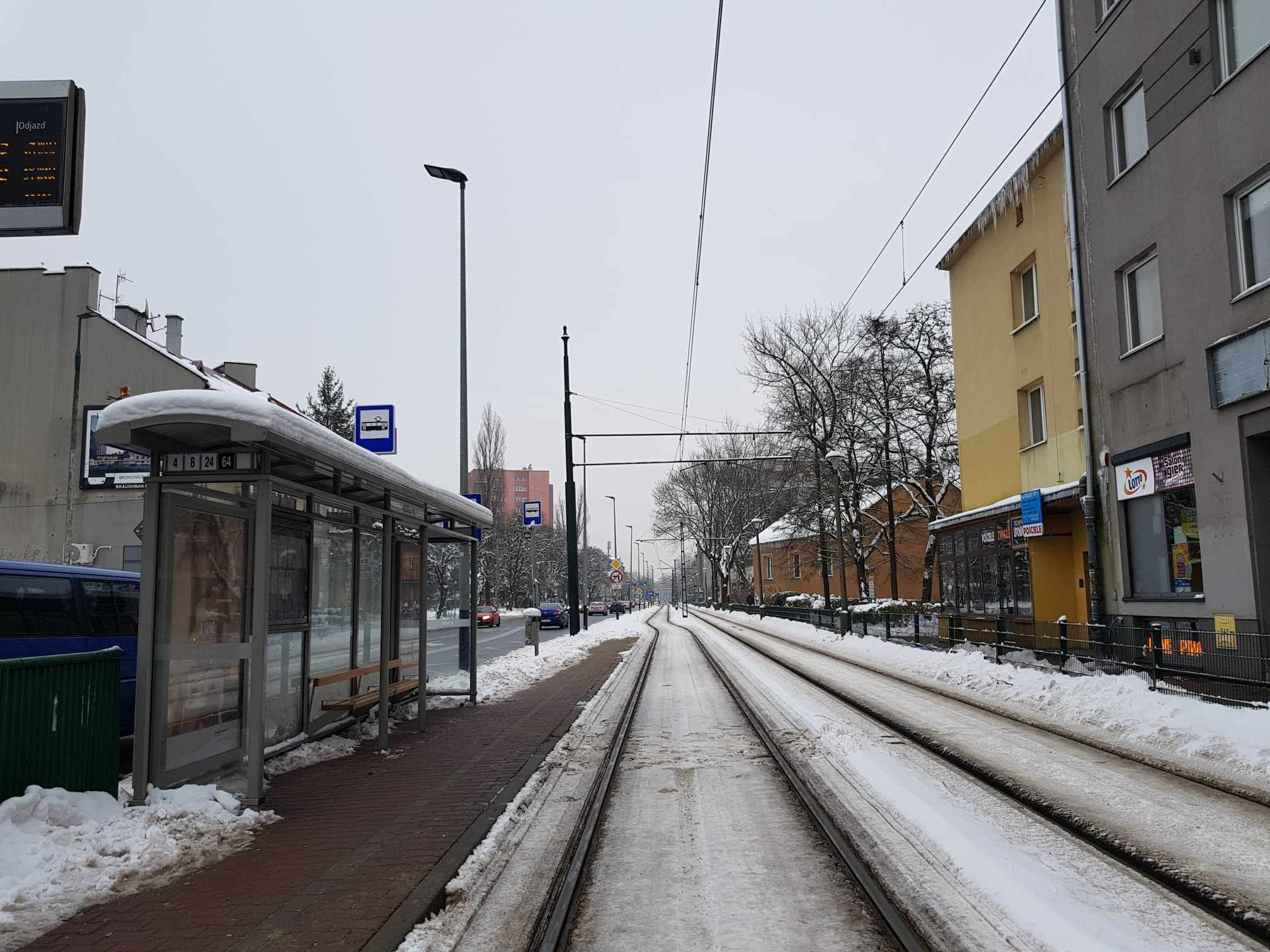
Tram tracks running across the street.

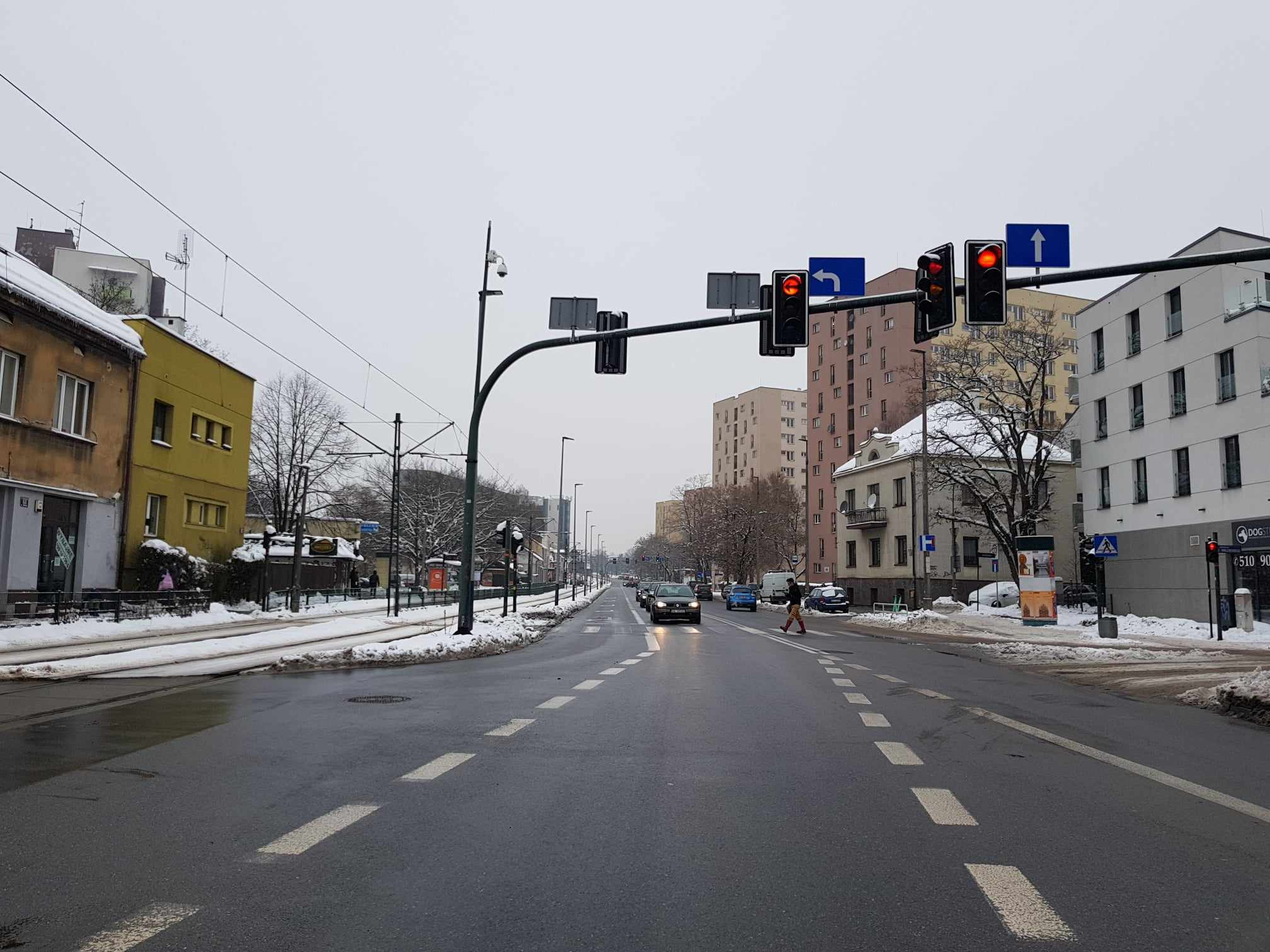
View to the northwest.

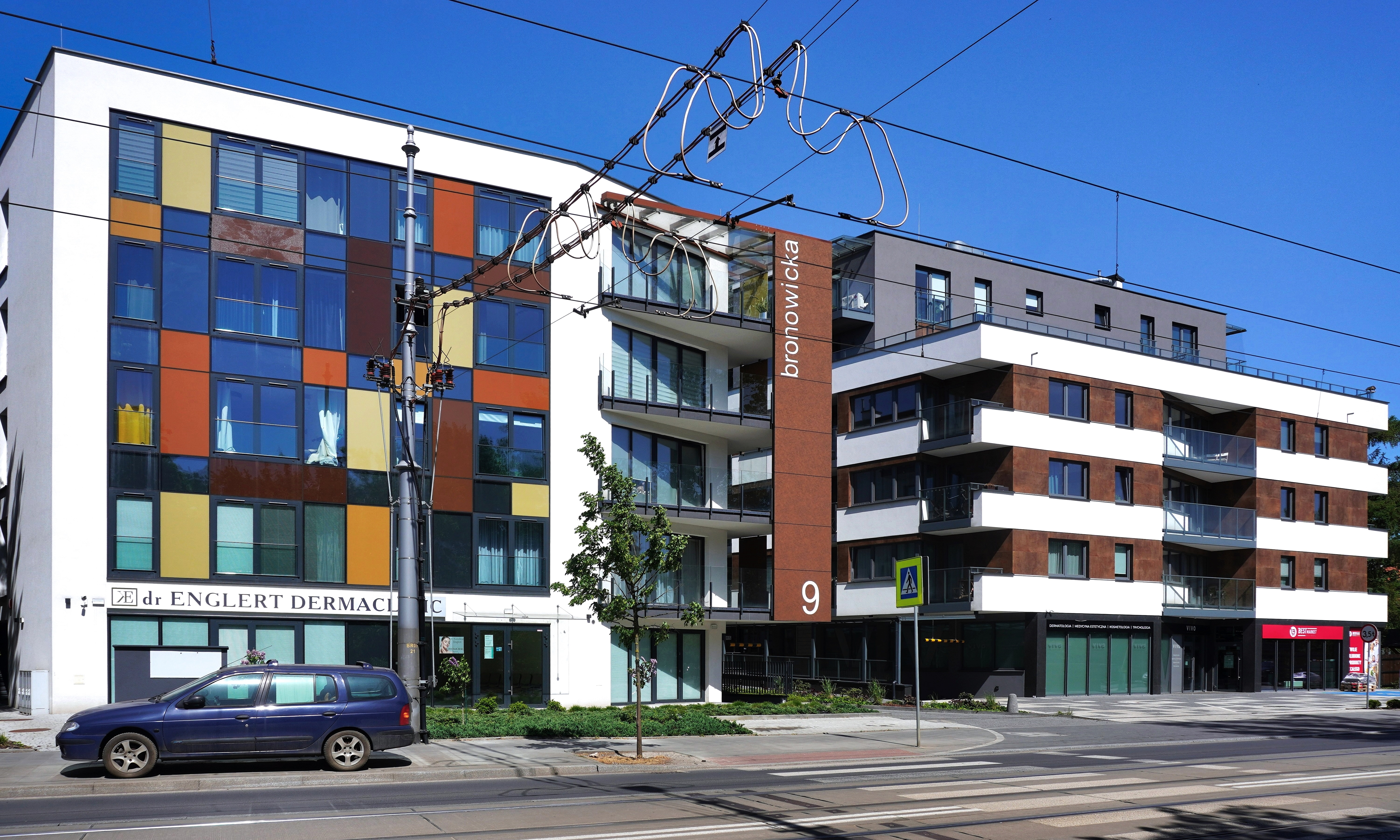
5–9 Bronowicka Street
Residential buildings (2020–2022)
