= Piastowska Street =

Street in Kraków, Poland

Piastowska street
Kraków
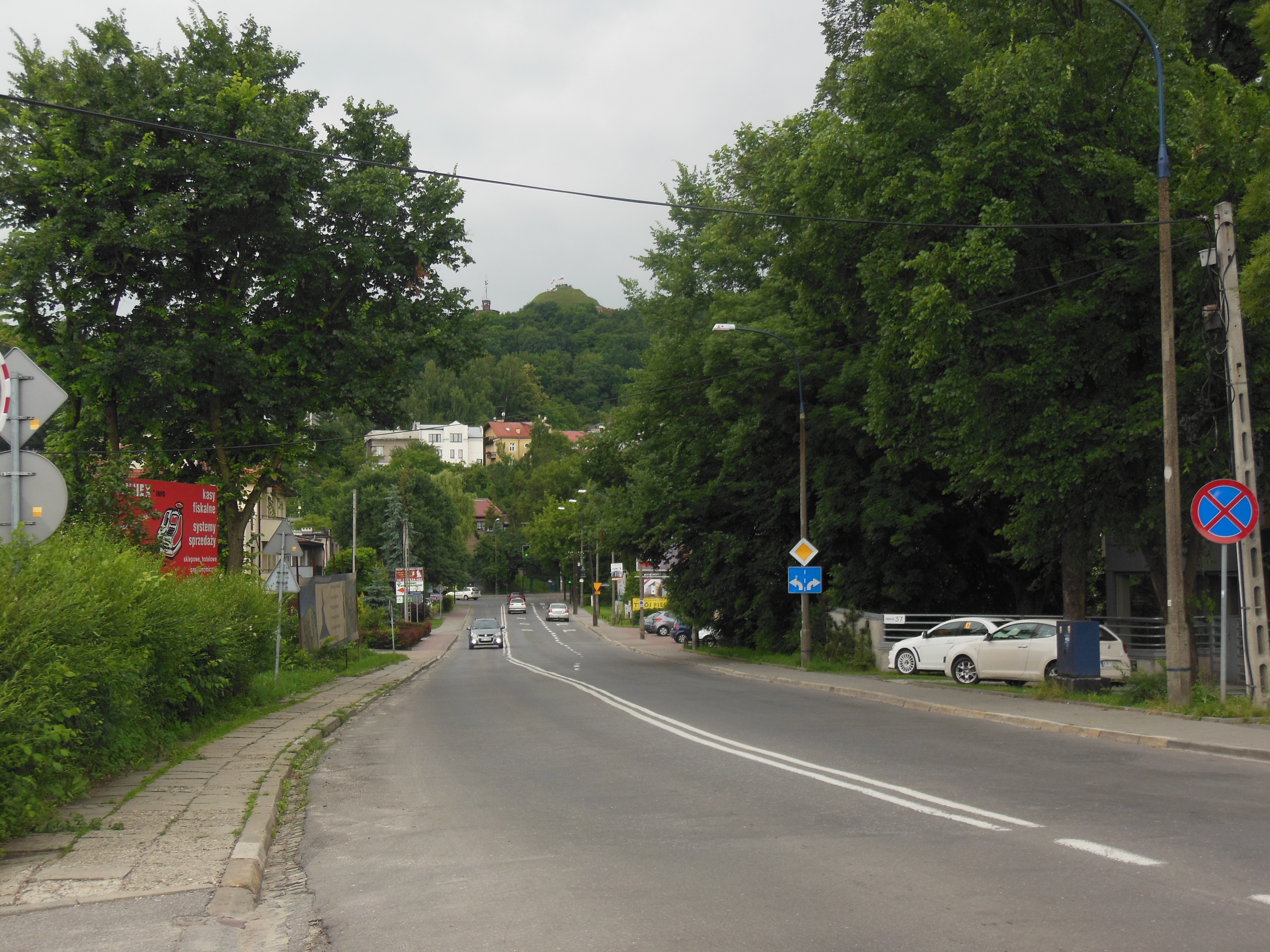
- View to the south, with the Kościuszko Mound in the background
- Interactive map of Piastowska street
- Part of: Kraków Krowodrza, Bronowice, and Zwierzyniec
- Owner: City of Kraków
- Location: Kraków, Poland

Piastowska Street is a street in Kraków in the districts of Krowodrza, Bronowice, and Zwierzyniec.

It runs from the intersection with Podchorążych and Bronowicka streets in a southerly direction, then turns southwest to the intersection with Królowej Jadwigi Street. It is 2,047 meters long.

== History ==
The street was laid out on the historical lands of Zwierzyniec, Czarna Wieś, and Łobzów, partially utilizing existing rural roads. Around the mid-19th century, it served as a fortress road connecting the system of fortifications around the city (Kraków Fortress). The street takes its name from the Piast dynasty and has been in use since 1912.

On the section between the Rudawa River and the intersection with 3 Maja Avenue, it marks the western boundary of Błonia Park. In the central part, the residential neighborhood Cichy Kącik is located on the eastern side, while the sports facilities of the Jagiellonian University (UJ) are on the western side. Further on, between Reymonta and Nawojki Streets, it crosses the area of the Miasteczko Studenckie AGH. The northern section runs alongside a residential block complex (built between the 1960s and 1990s).

The square at the intersection of Piastowska Street and Podchorążych Street has been named after General Franciszek Ksawery Latinik.

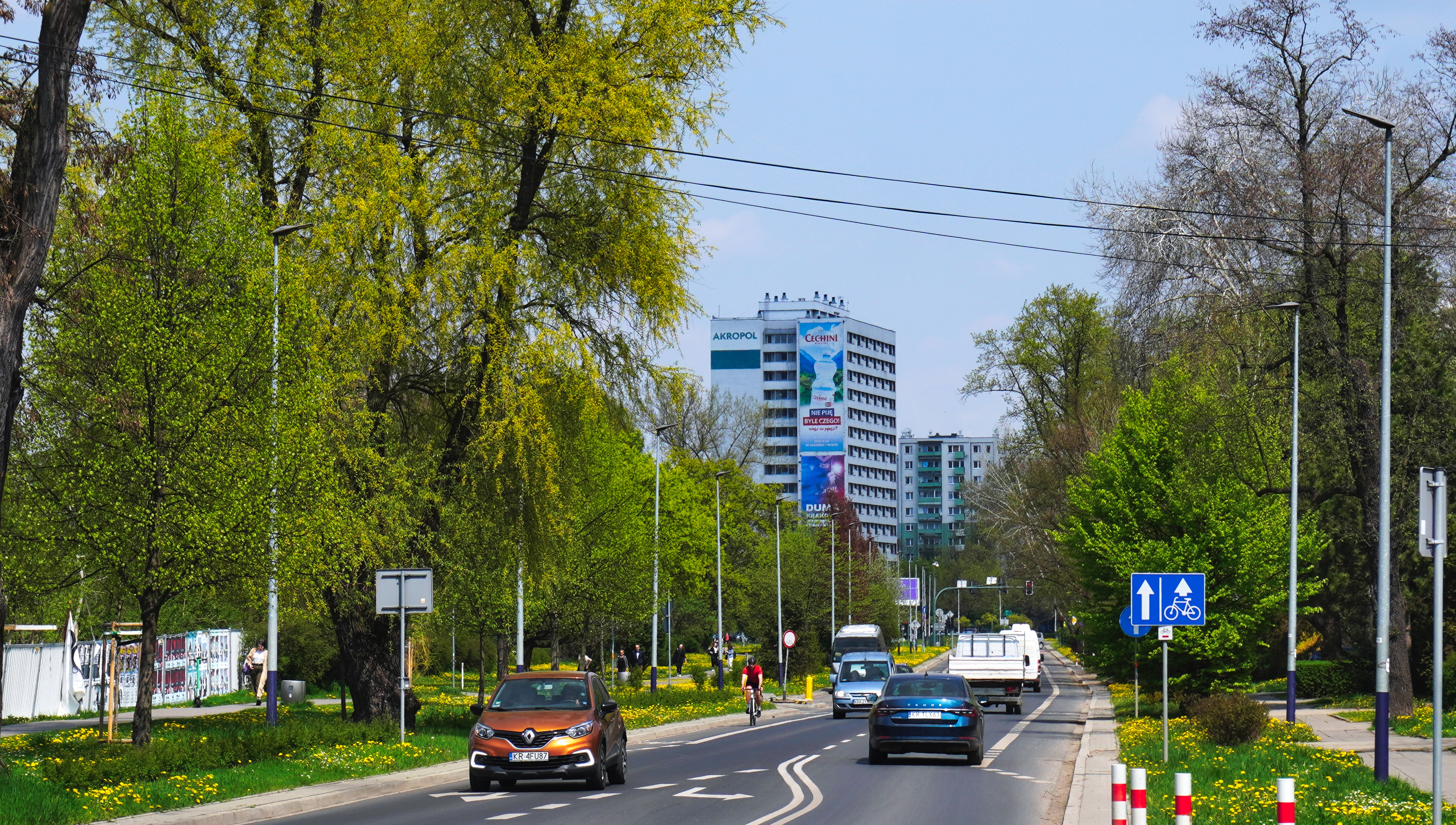
View from the "Cichy Kącik" tram terminus looking north
