= Bronowice Małe =

Neighborhood in Kraków, Poland

- Neighborhood
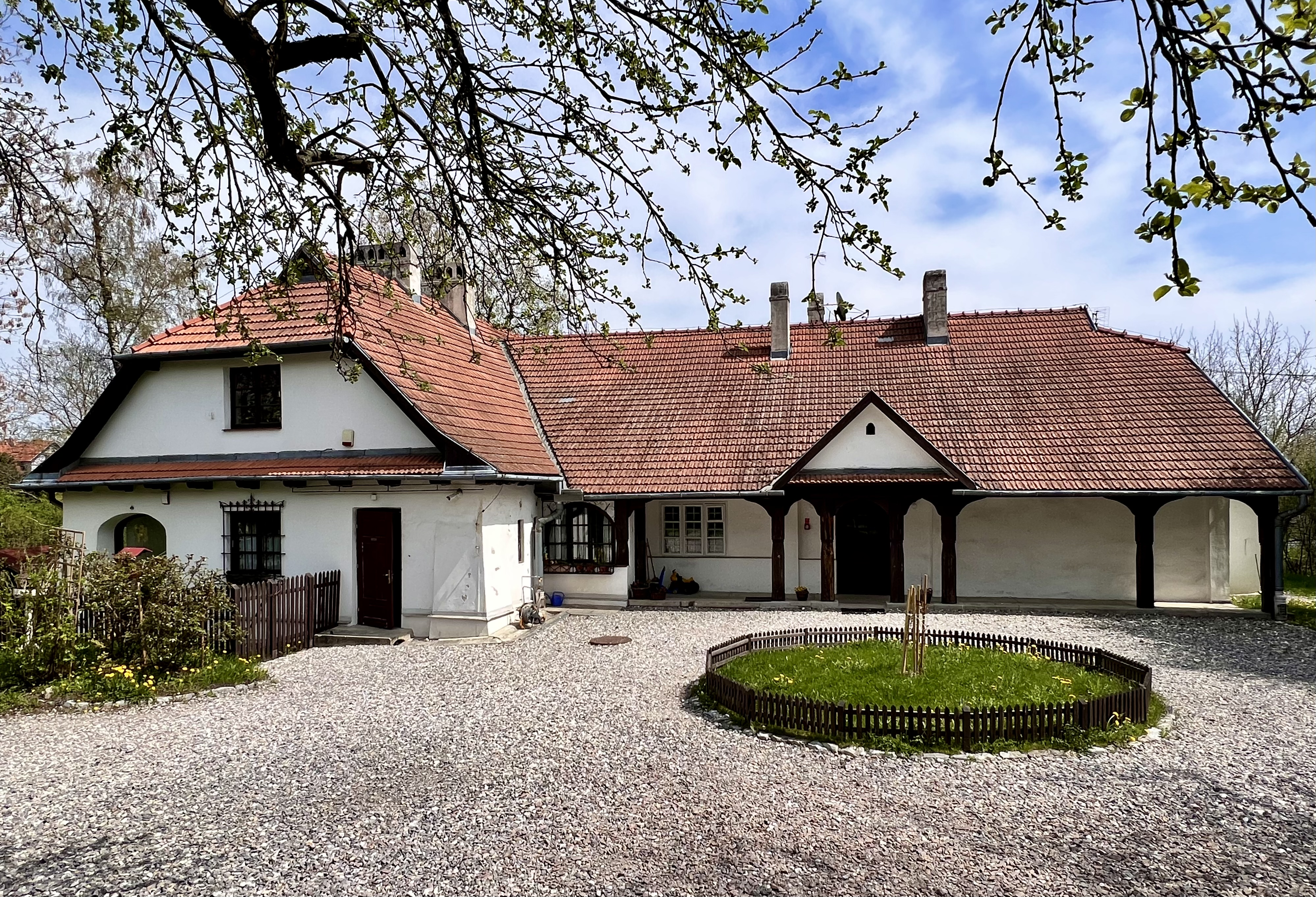
- Rydlówka manor house-museum

- Location within Poland
- Coordinates: 50°5′11.37″N 19°52′54.97″E
- Country: Poland
- Voivodeship: Lesser Poland
- City: Kraków
- District: Bronowice
- Time zone: UTC+1:00 (CET)
  - Summer (DST): UTC+2:00 (CEST)

Bronowice Małe is a neighborhood (osiedle) of Kraków, part of the Bronowice district.

== History ==
Since 1294 the location was recorded to be a property of St. Mary's Basilica, Kraków. In 1934–1941 it was part of rural gmina Gmina Bronowice Małe and was its administrative center.

== People associated with Bronowice Małe ==
- Rydel family; see Rydlówka manor house-museum
  - Lucjan Rydel (1870–1918), poet, playwright
  - Lucjan Rydel (ophthalmologist) (1833–1895), professor, rector of the Jagiellonian University
  - Anna Rydlówna (1884–1969), nurse, recipient of the Florence Nightingale Medal
  - Jan Rydel, historian, chief of the Polish section of the European Network Remembrance and Solidarity
  - Maria Rydlowa, literature historian, editor, author, museum curator, recipient of the Silver Medal for Merit to Culture – Gloria Artis
- Józefa Singer (Perel Singer, Pepa Singer) (1881–1955), the prototype of Rachel from The Wedding, an influential 1901 play by Stanisław Wyspiański
- Włodzimierz Tetmajer (1861–1923), artist and writer
