= Third of May Avenue =

Street in Kraków, Poland

Kraków
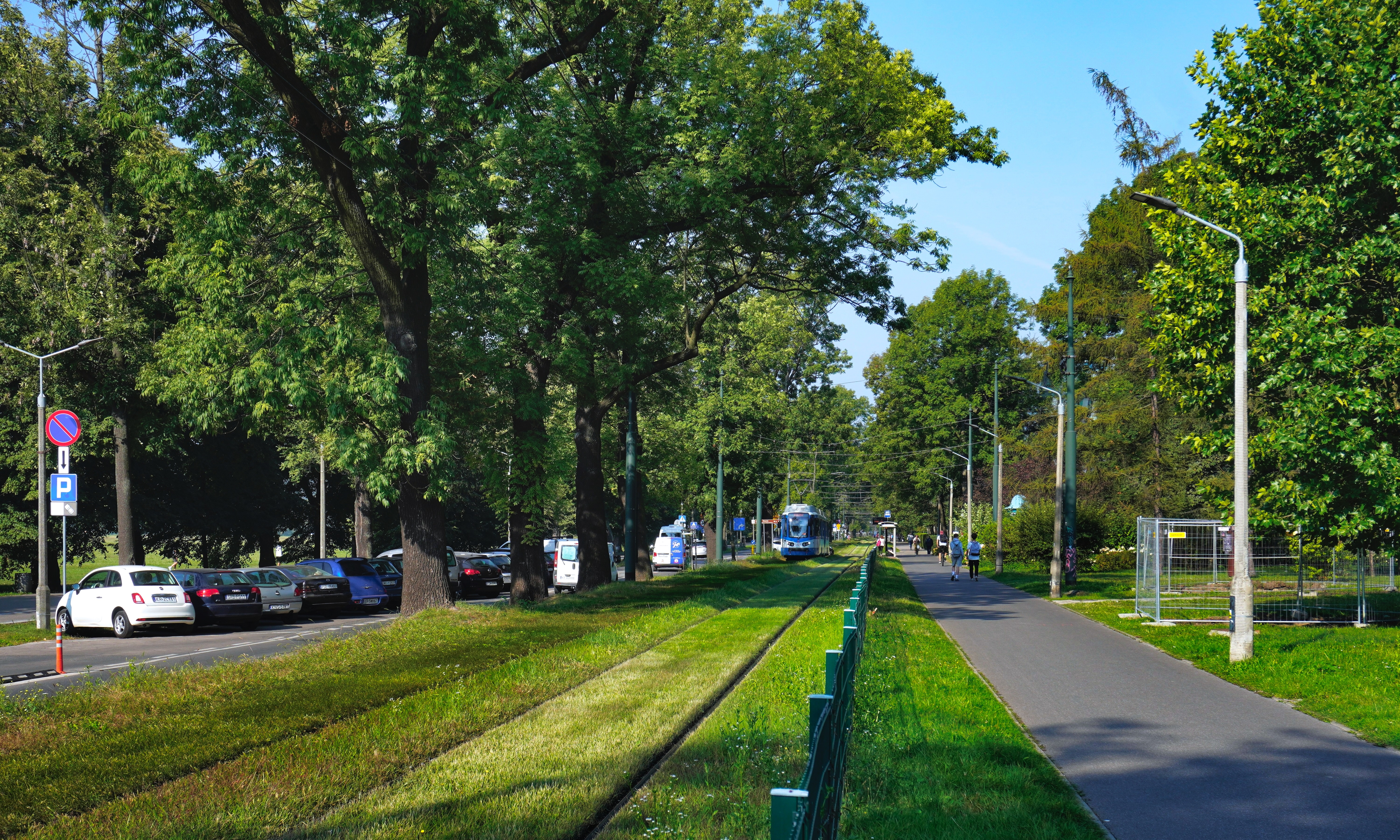
- View west
- Interactive map of Third of May Avenue
- Part of: Kraków Old Town
- Owner: City of Kraków
- Location: Kraków, Poland

Third of May Avenue is a street in Kraków serving as a boundary between Półwsie Zwierzynieckie and District V Krowodrza on one side, and Czarna Wieś and District VII Zwierzyniec on the other.

The avenue connects Ferdinand Foch Avenue and the Aleje Trzech Wieszczów (Avenue of the Three Bards) with Piastowska Street and is approximately 1.6 kilometers long.

== History ==
The former Road to Wola Justowska was rebuilt and lined with trees by Austrian troops between 1850 and 1855. The military was involved due to the strategic importance of the road, which provided access to a fort in Cichy Kącik that existed until 1934. The avenue received its current name in 1912.

== Objects ==
- 3 Maja Avenue 1 – Main Building of the National Museum
- 3 Maja Avenue 5 – Student Hotel "Żaczek" and the SCK Rotunda
- 3 Maja Avenue 7 (2 Oleandry Street) – Józef Piłsudski House
- 3 Maja Avenue 11 (18 Władysława Reymonta Street) – Henryk Jordan Park
- 3 Maja Avenue 51 – AC Hotel by Marriott Krakow
- 3 Maja Avenue 55 – Former site of the KS Cracovia swimming pool complex; only the locker room and filter building remain
- Tram loop "Cichy Kącik"
- Błonia
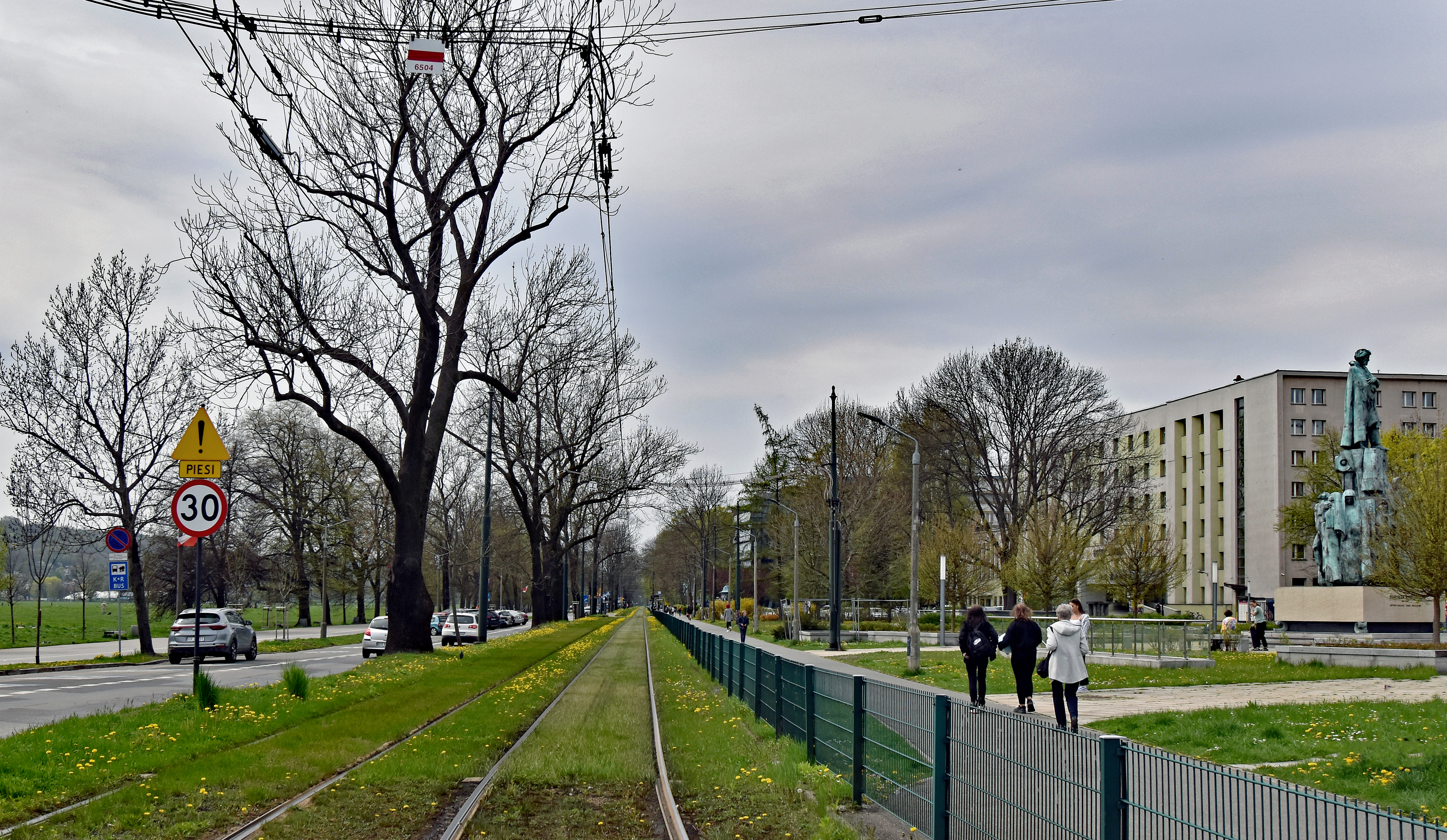
The street seen from the east (from Ferdinanda Focha Avenue)

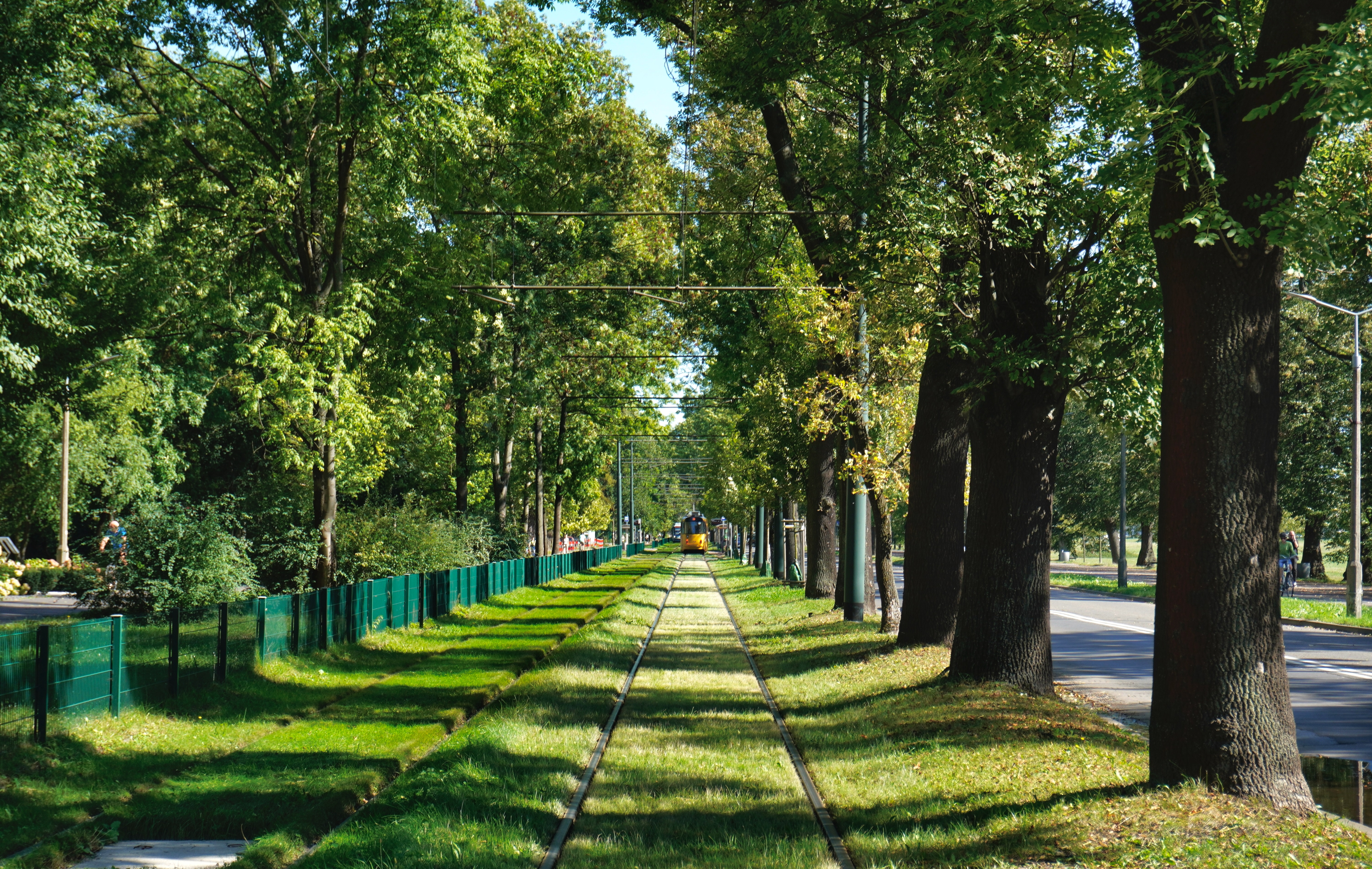
View to the east, from the tram loop "Cichy Kącik"

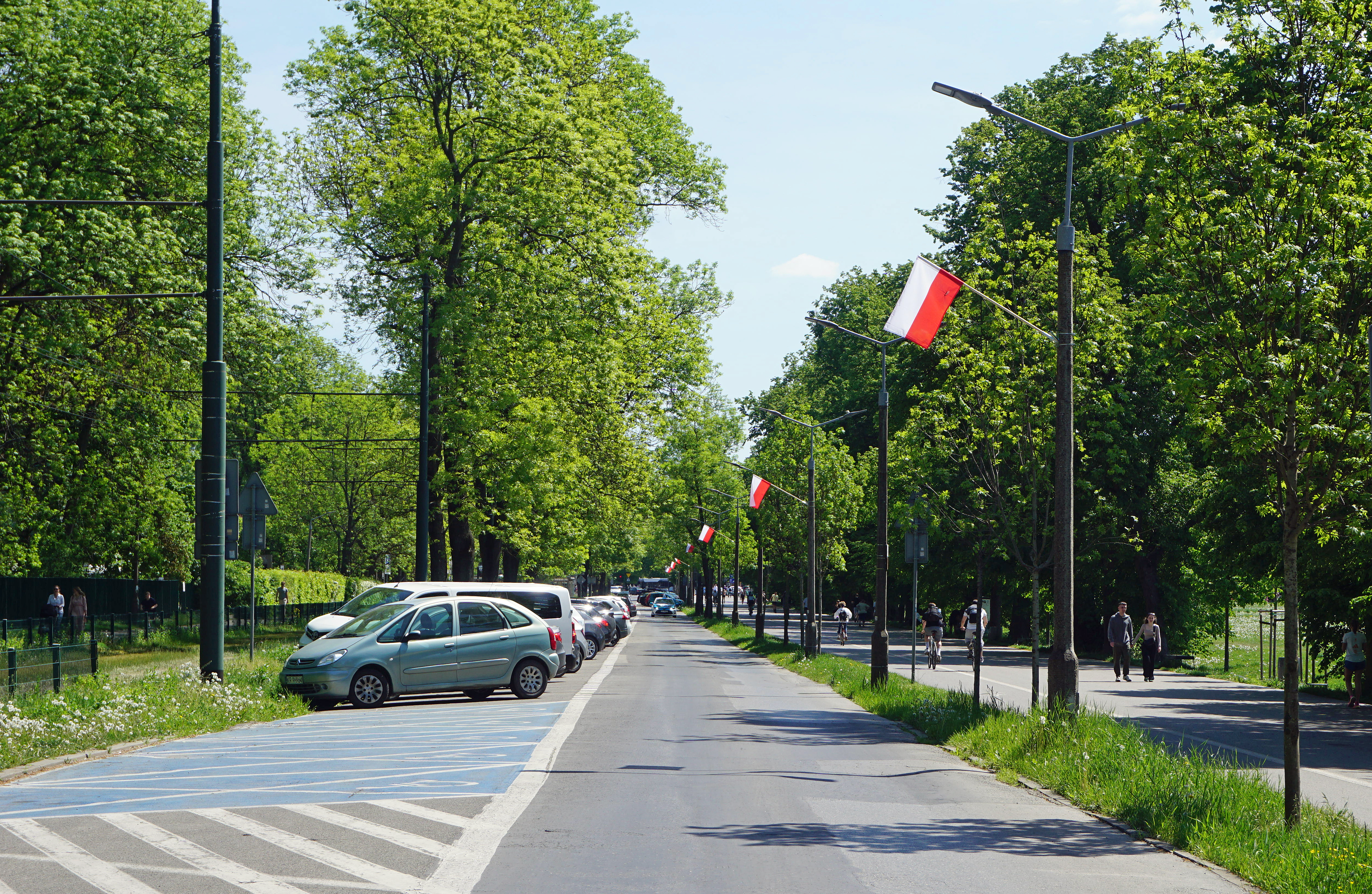
Flag Day of the Republic of Poland, 2025

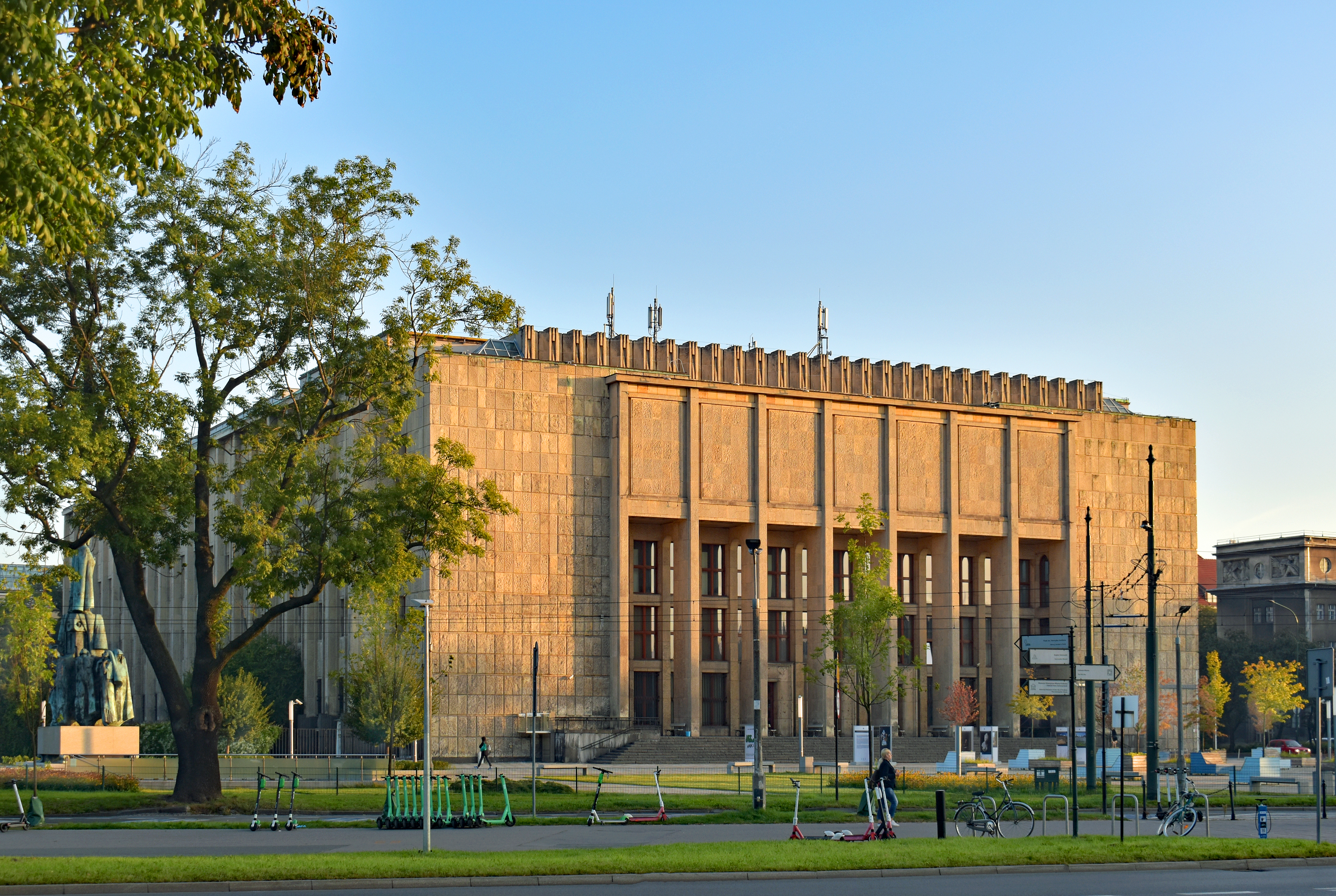
1 3 Maja Avenue
Main Building of the National Museum

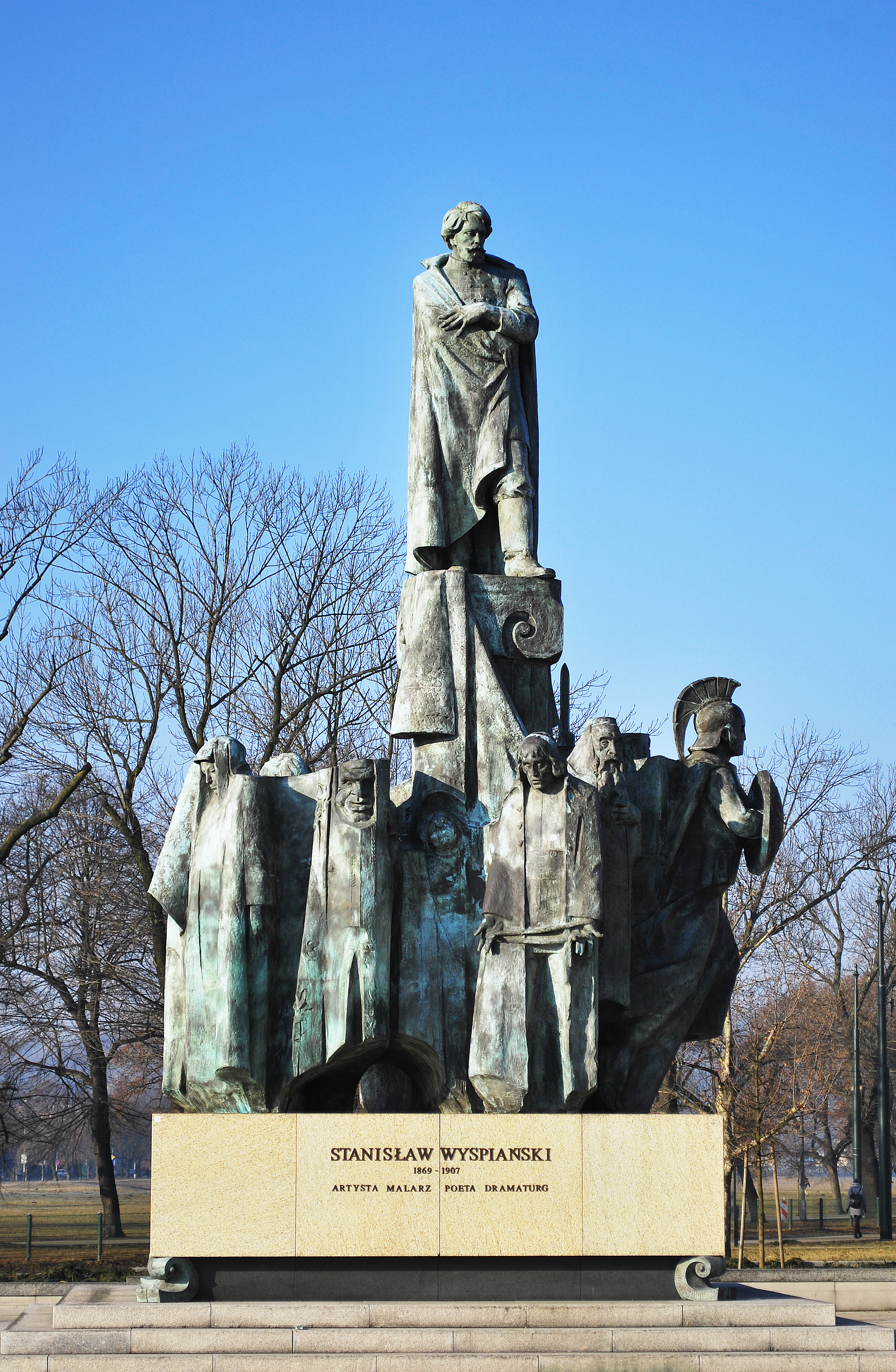
1 3 Maja Avenue
Monument to Stanisław Wyspiański

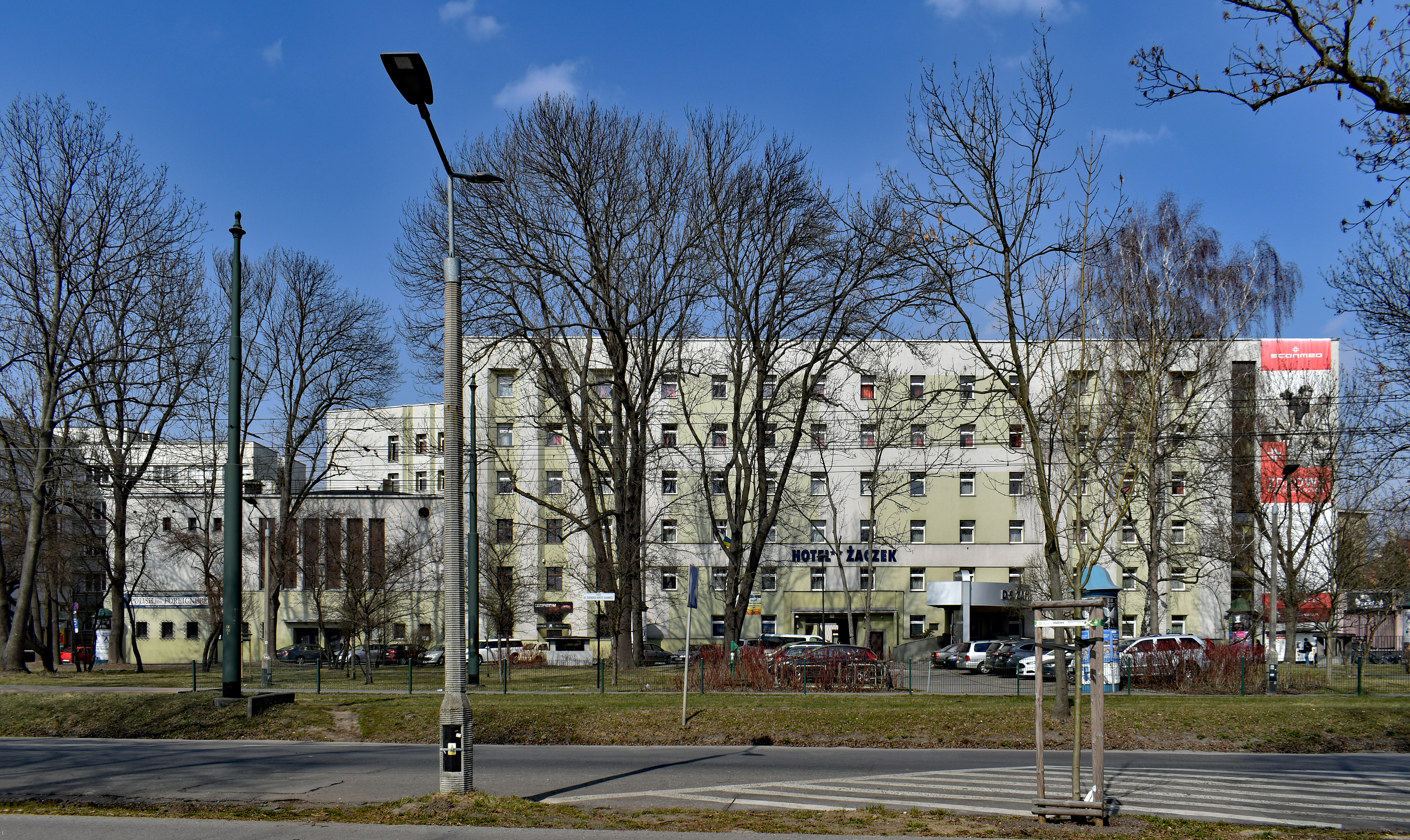
5 3 Maja Avenue
Hotel "Żaczek" and "Rotunda"

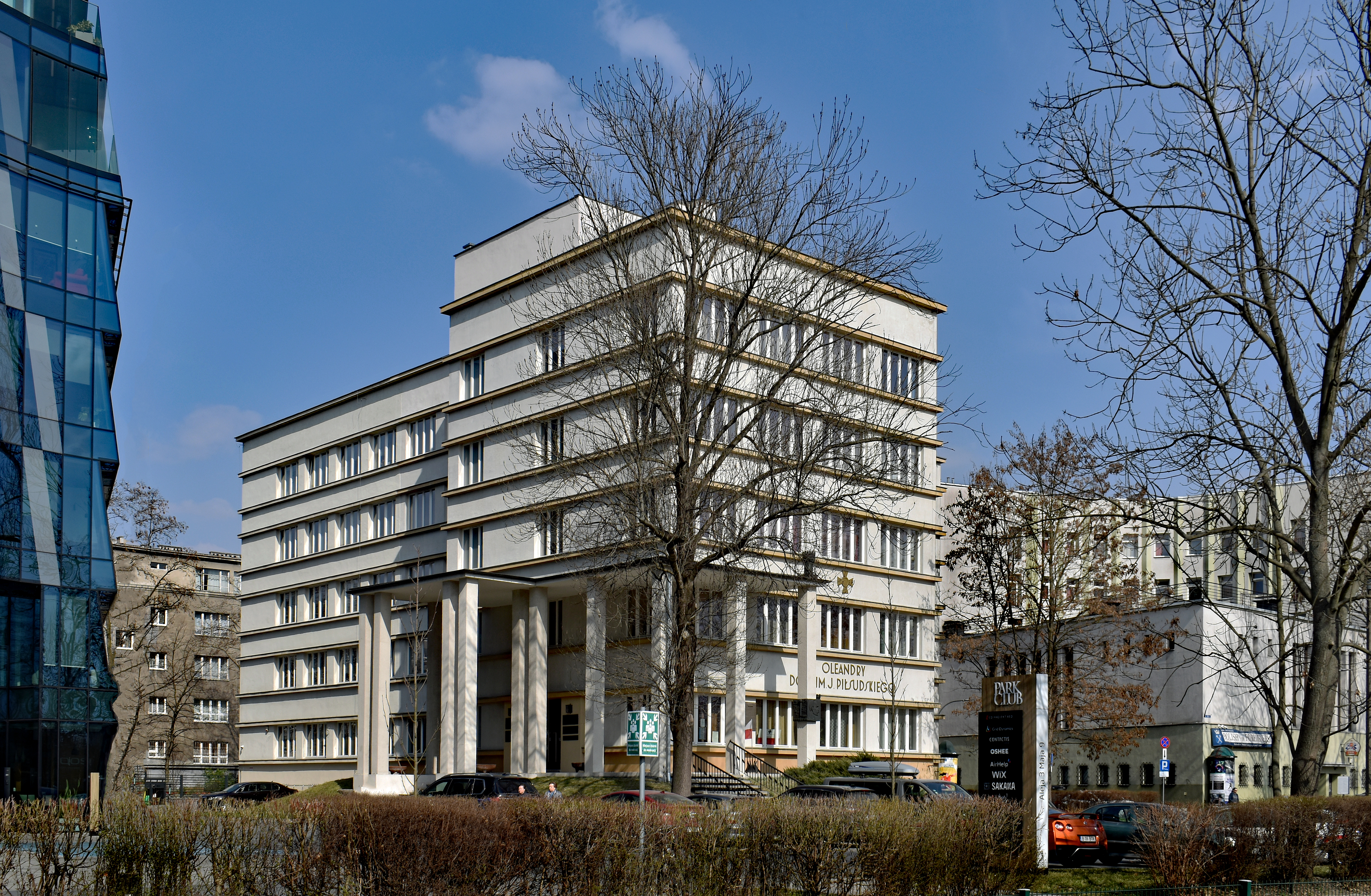
7 3 Maja Avenue
House named after Józef Piłsudski

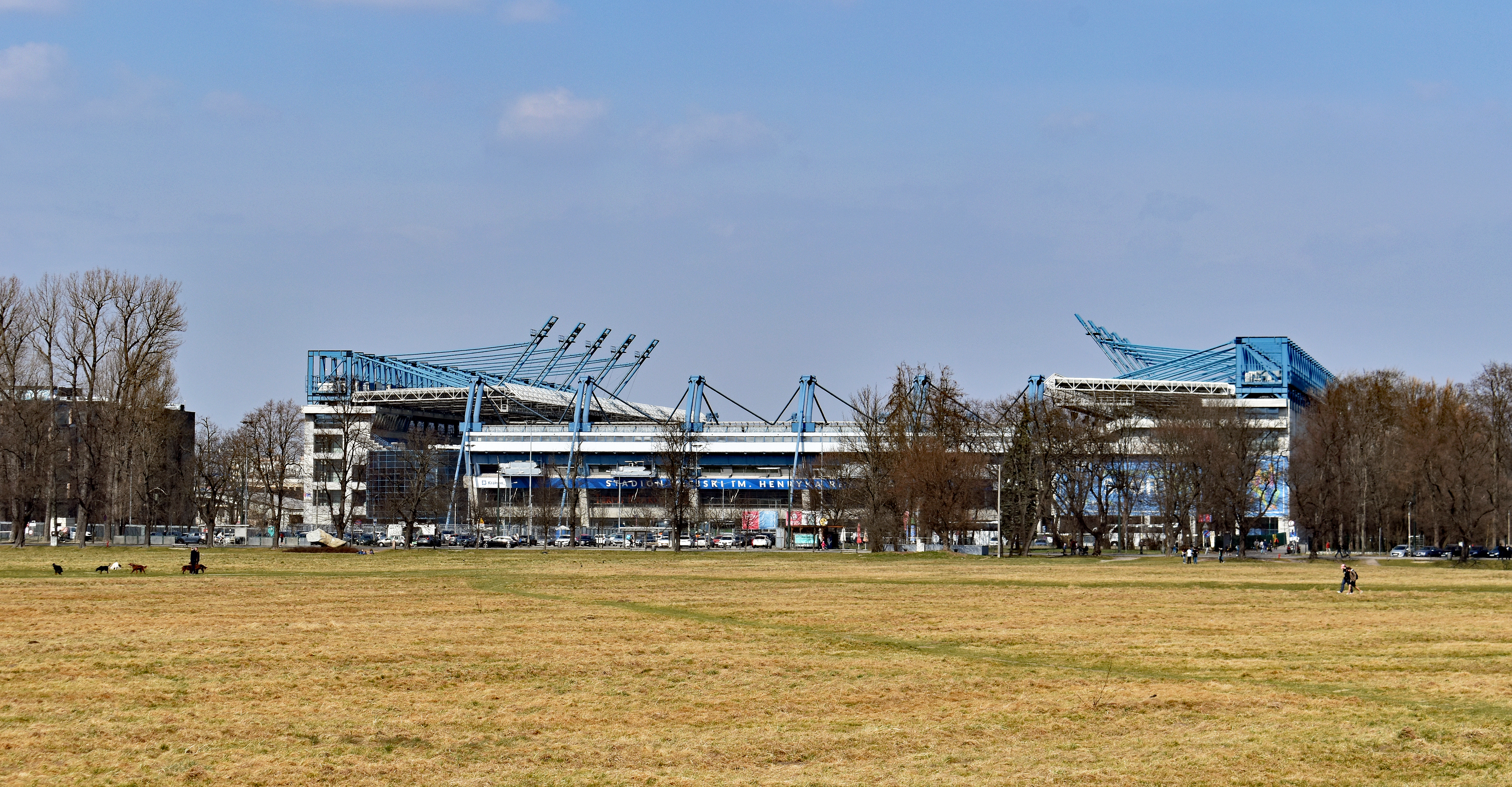
3 Maja Avenue
Henryk Reyman Municipal Stadium seen from Błonia

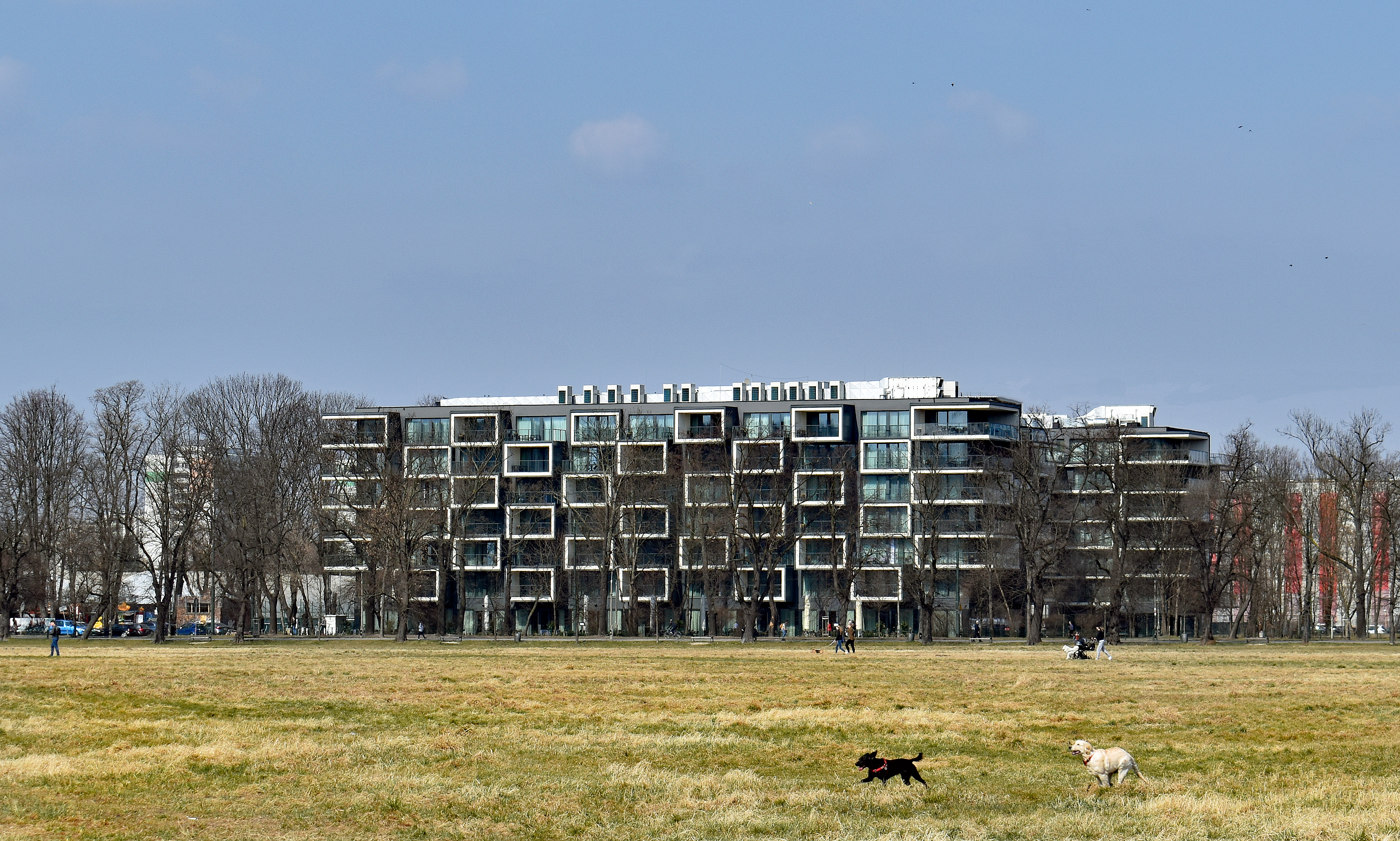
51 3 Maja Avenue
AC Hotel by Marriott Krakow

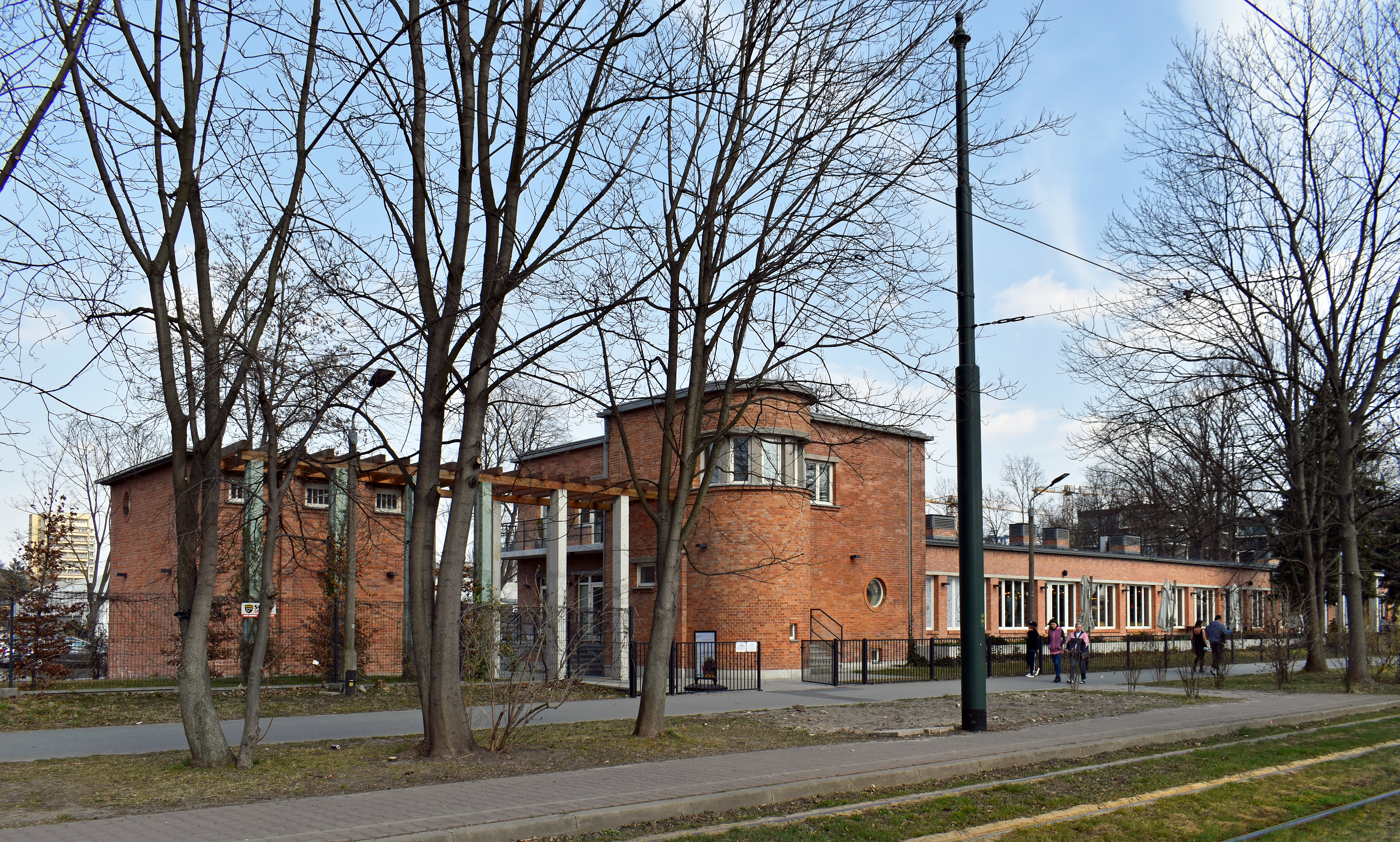
55 3 Maja Avenue
Former KS Cracovia swimming pools, cloakroom and filter buildings
