= Anna Rydlówna =

Polish nurse (1884–1969)

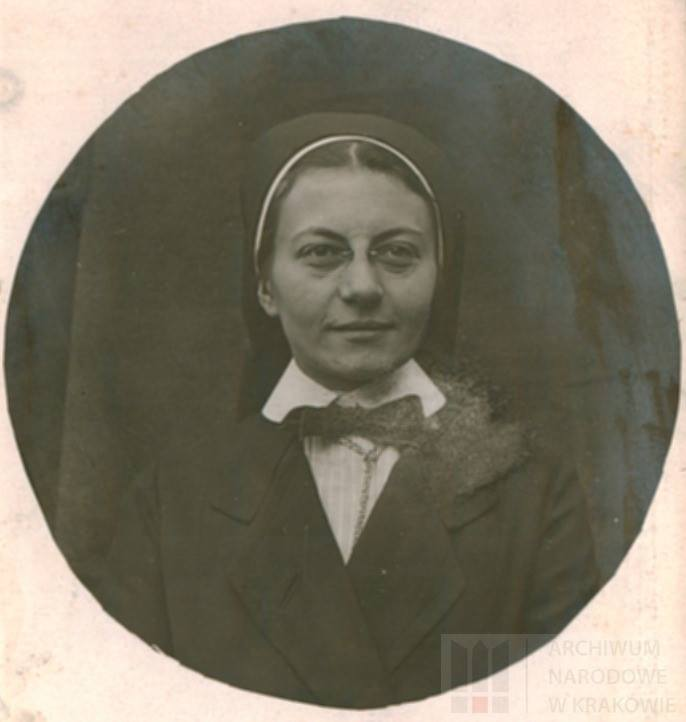

Anna Rydlówna (30 December 1884, Kraków – 6 March 1969, Kraków) was a Polish nurse and recipient of the Florence Nightingale Medal.

The school of nursing in Kraków is named in her memory.
