= Rydlówka =

Museum in Kraków, Poland

Coordinates: 50°05′16″N 19°52′41″E

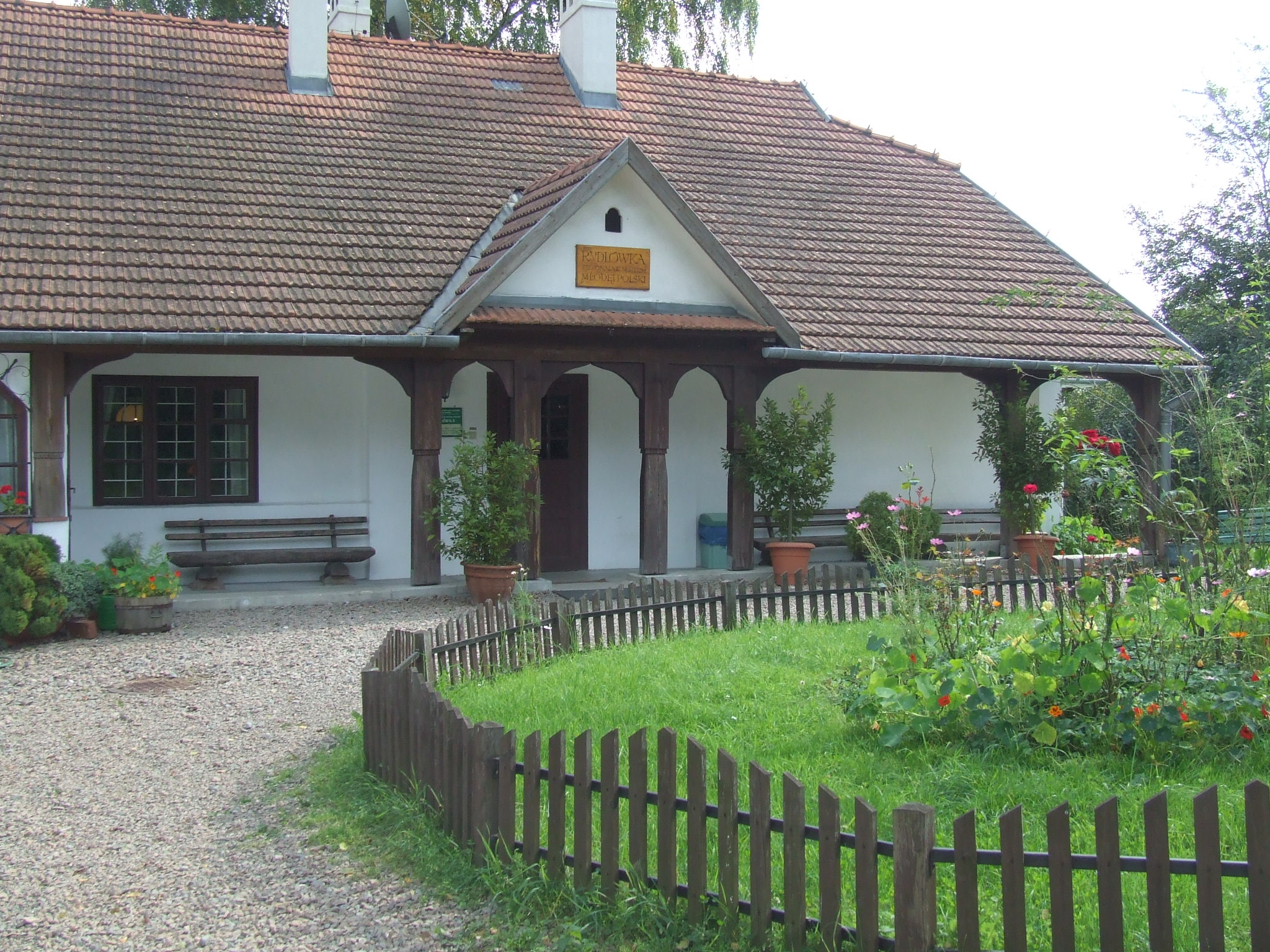

Regionalne Muzeum Młodej Polski "Rydlówka" is a museum in Kraków, Poland. It was constructed in 1894.
