= Łobzów =

- Village
- Location within Poland
- Coordinates: 50°24′16″N 19°46′04″E
- Country: Poland
- Voivodeship: Lesser Poland
- County: Olkusz
- Gmina: Wolbrom
- Population: 1,100

Łobzów [ˈwɔbzuf] is a village in the administrative district of Gmina Wolbrom, within Olkusz County, Lesser Poland Voivodeship, in southern Poland.

== History ==
As a result of the Partitions of Poland (1772–95), the Galicia area and Kraków ware attributed to the Habsburg Monarchy. Łobzów was in the Bezirkshauptmannschaft (powiat?) of Kraków in Austrian Galicia in 1900.

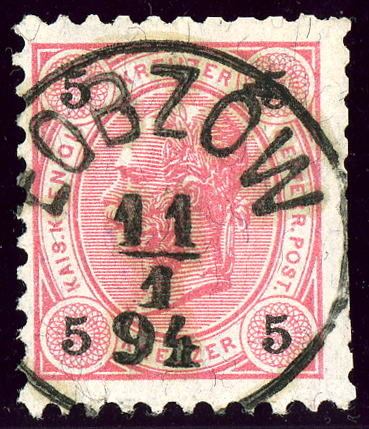
Austria KK 5 kreuzer stamp, cancelled at Łobzów in 1894
