= Bronowice, Kraków =

Bronowice
- Dzielnica of Kraków
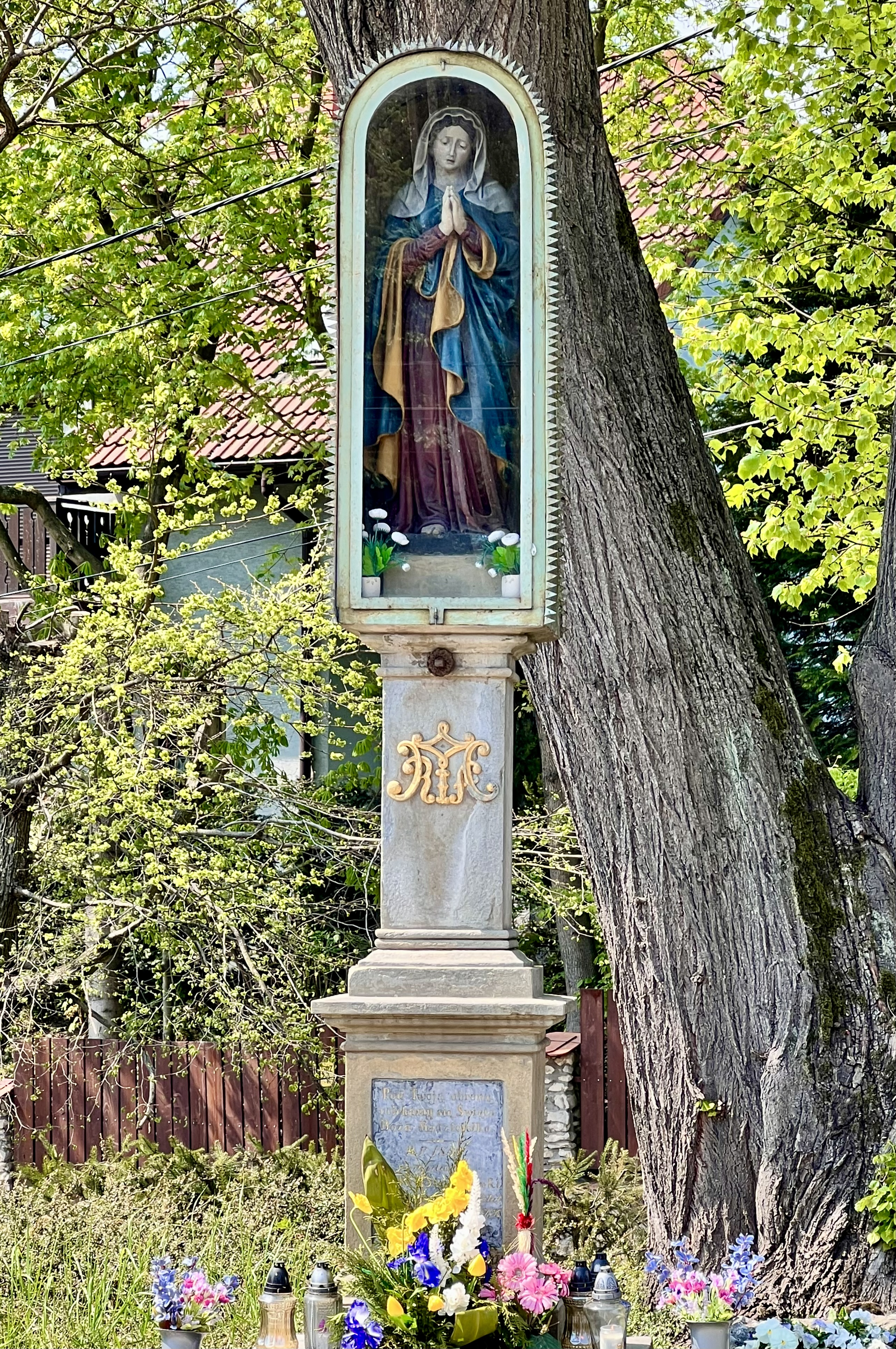

- Location of Bronowice within Kraków
- Coordinates: 50°5′0″N 19°52′0″E
- Country: Poland
- Voivodeship: Lesser Poland
- County/City: Kraków

Government
  - President: Bogdan Smok

Area
  - Total: 9.56 km^{2} (3.69 sq mi)

Population (2020)
  - Total: 24,014
  - Density: 2,510/km^{2} (6,510/sq mi)
- Time zone: UTC+1 (CET)
  - Summer (DST): UTC+2 (CEST)
- Area code: +48 12
- Website: http://www.dzielnica6.krakow.pl

Bronowice is one of 18 districts of Kraków, located in the western part of the city. The name Bronowice comes from a village of same name that is now a part of the district.

According to the Central Statistical Office data, the district's area is 9.56 square kilometres (3.69 square miles) and 24,014 people inhabit Bronowice.

== Subdivisions of Bronowice ==
Bronowice is divided into smaller subdivisions (osiedles).

- Mydlniki
- Bronowice Małe
- Bronowice Małe Wschód
- Osiedle Bronowice Nowe
- Osiedle Widok Zarzecze
