= Jan Środoń =

Polish geologist (born 1947)

- Born: 26 April 1947 (age 79)
- Citizenship: Polish
- Education: AGH
- Occupation: Geologist

Jan Środoń (born 26 April 1947) is a geologist and mineralogist, professor of the Institute of Geological Sciences of the Polish Academy of Sciences.

== Biography ==
Son of Andrzej Środoń and Maria Łańcucka-Środoń.

He graduated from AGH in 1970. He obtained doctorate from AGH in 1975. He obtained habilitation in 1986. In September 1980 he joined the Solidarity. He supervised five doctoral dissertations.

== Accolades ==
- Knight's Cross of the Order of Polonia Restituta (2007)
- Officer's Cross of the Order of Polonia Restituta (2017)
