= Teofil Lenartowicz Street =

Street in Cracow

Teofil Lenartowicz street
Kraków
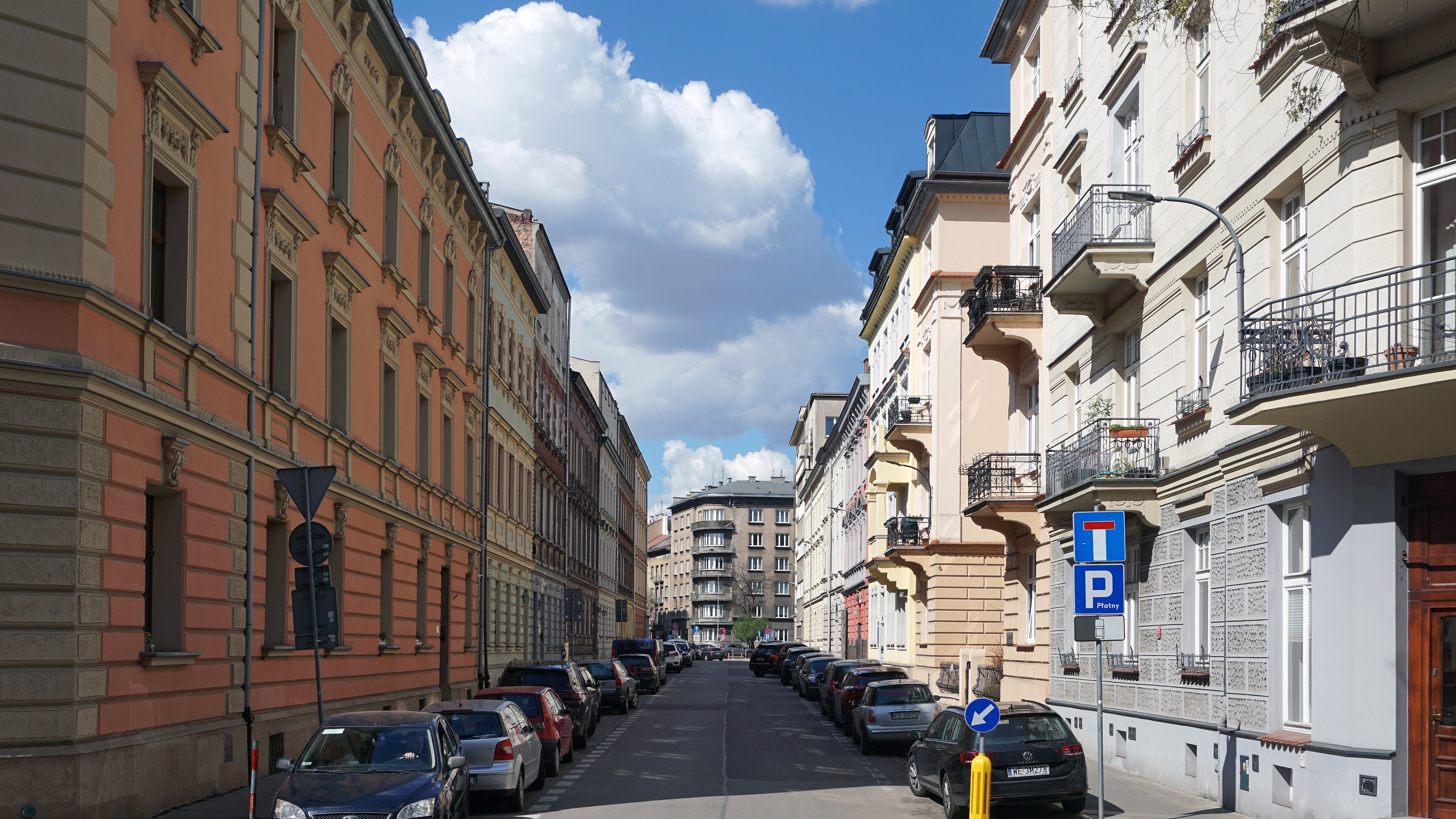
- View of the street
- Interactive map of Teofil Lenartowicz street
- Part of: Kraków Old Town and Krowodrza district
- Owner: City of Kraków
- Location: Kraków, Poland

Teofil Lenartowicz in Kraków is a street in Kraków, in District I Old Town, in Piasek and in District V Krowodrza in Nowa Wieś.

It connects Henryk Sienkiewicz Street with Henryk Siemiradzki Street. It is a single-carriageway road.

== History ==
The street in its current form was laid out in 1893. Originally, it ran from Henryk Siemiradzki Street to Juliusz Słowacki Avenue, and its extension beyond the avenue to Henryk Sienkiewicz Street took place in the 1930s.

A year after its establishment, in 1894, the street was named after Teofil Lenartowicz – a Polish ethnographer, sculptor, conspirator, and Romantic poet.

== Buildings ==
On the western side of the street:

- 2 Teofil Lenartowicz Street (27 Henryk Siemiradzki Street) – tenement house, 19th century.
- 4 Teofil Lenartowicz Street – tenement house, 19th century.
- 6 Teofil Lenartowicz Street – tenement house, 19th century.
- 8 Teofil Lenartowicz Street – tenement house, 19th century.
- 10 Teofil Lenartowicz Street – tenement house, 19th century.
- 12 Teofil Lenartowicz Street – tenement house, 19th century.
- 14 Teofil Lenartowicz Street (Juliusz Słowacki Avenue) – tenement house, 1895–1896.
- 18 Teofil Lenartowicz Street – tenement house. Designed by Alfred Düntuch and Stefan Landsberger, 1934.
- 20 Teofil Lenartowicz Street (9 Henryk Sienkiewicz Street) – tenement house, 1935.

On the eastern side of the street:

- 1 Teofil Lenartowicz Street (25 Henryk Siemiradzki Street) – tenement house. Designed by Kazimierz Zieliński, 1911–1912.
- 3 Teofil Lenartowicz Street – tenement house, 20th century.
- 5 Teofil Lenartowicz Street – tenement house, 20th century.
- 7 Teofil Lenartowicz Street – tenement house, 19th century.
- 9 Teofil Lenartowicz Street – tenement house, 20th century.
- 11 Teofil Lenartowicz Street – tenement house, 19th century.
- 13 Teofil Lenartowicz Street – tenement house. Designed by Jakub Spira, 19th century.
- 15 Teofil Lenartowicz Street – tenement house. Designed by Samuel Nebenzahl, 1937.
- 19 Teofil Lenartowicz Street – tenement house. Designed by Zygmunt Grünberg, 1936.
- 21 Teofil Lenartowicz Street – tenement house. Designed by Stanisław Nebenzahl, 1935.
- 23 Teofil Lenartowicz Street (11 Henryk Sienkiewicz Street) – tenement house, 1935.
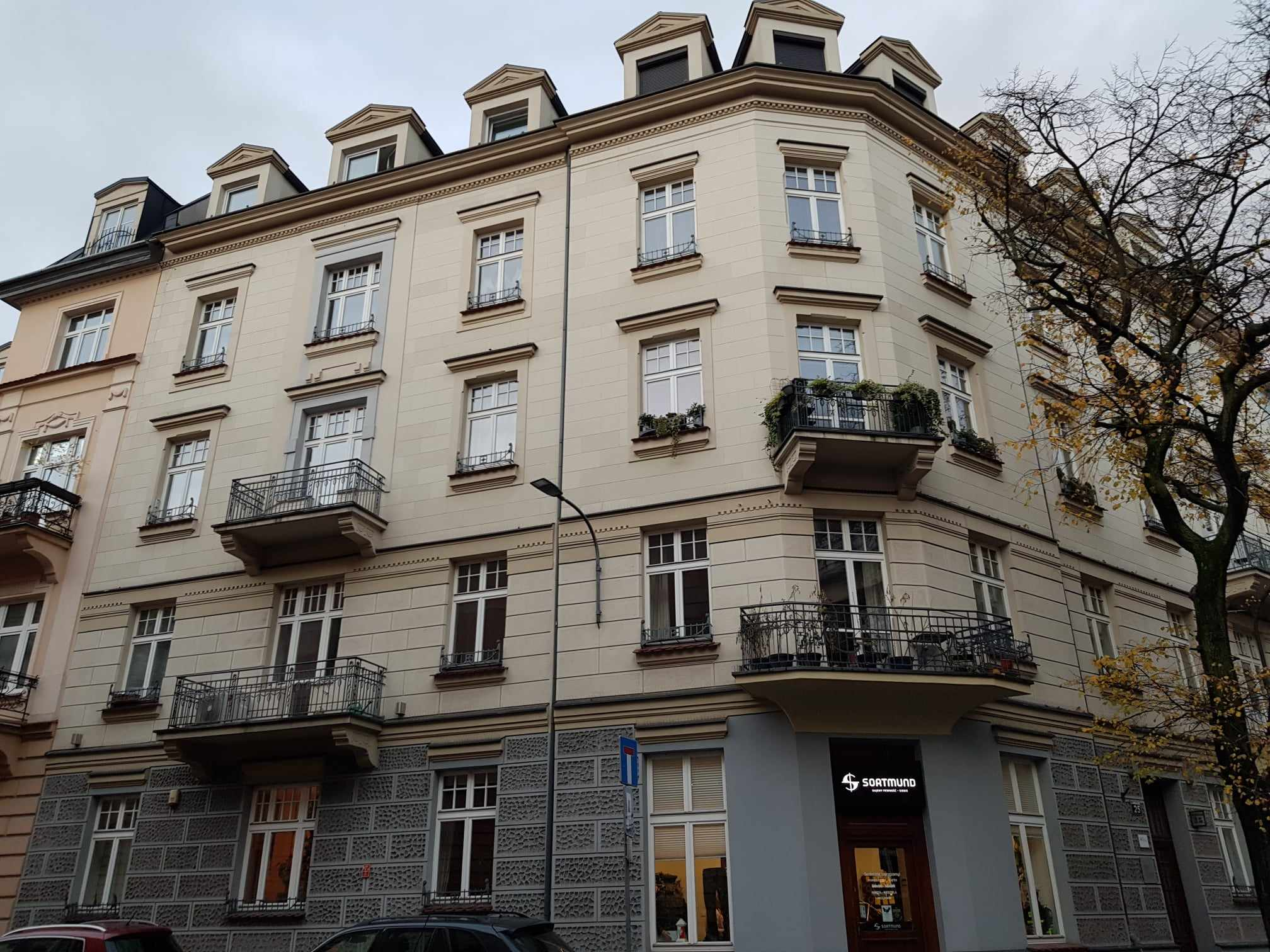
1 Teofil Lenartowicz Street Tenement house (design. Kazimierz Zieliński, 1911–1912)

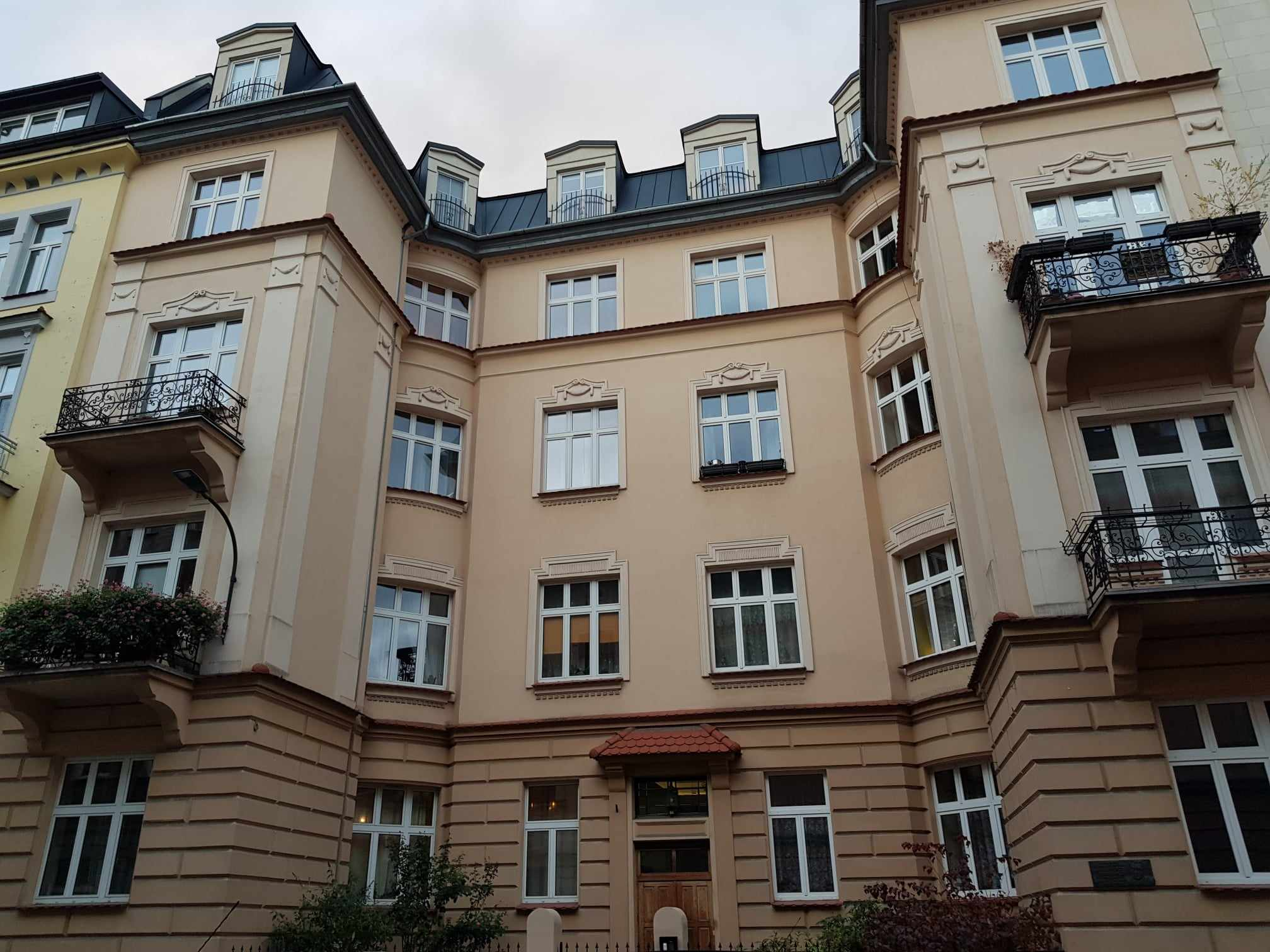
3 Teofil Lenartowicz Street Tenement house (20th century)

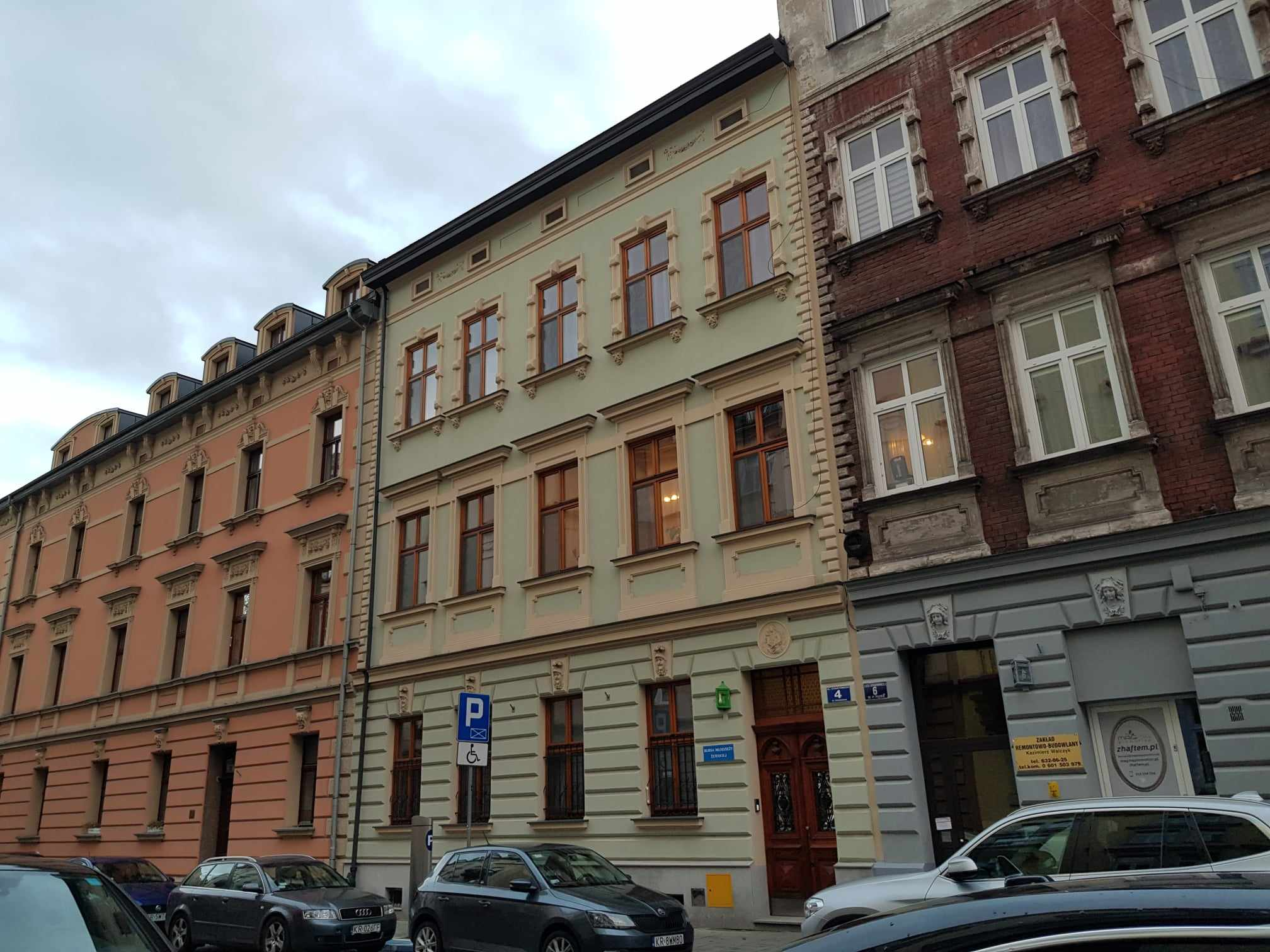
4 Teofil Lenartowicz Street Tenement house (19th century)

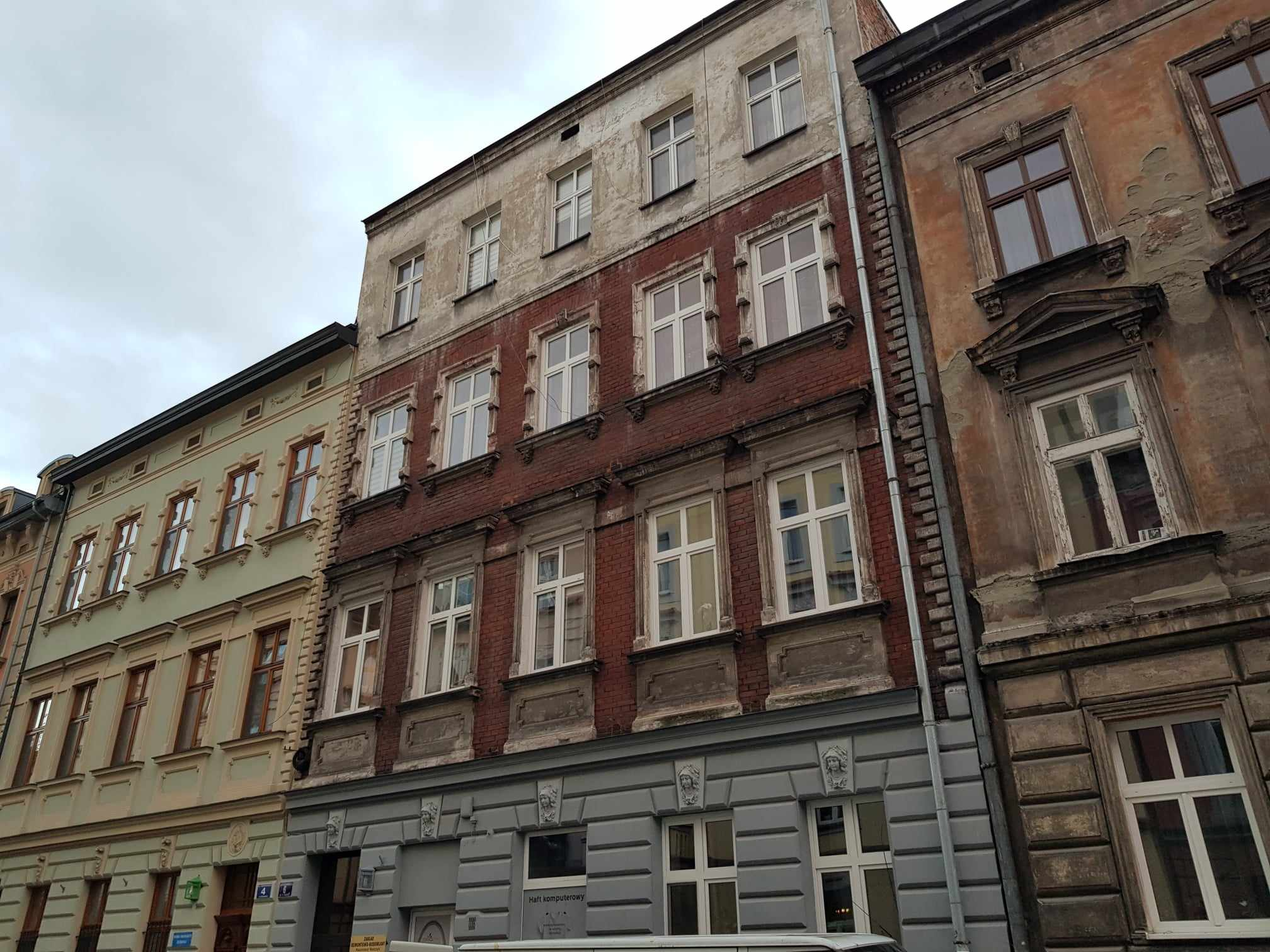
6 Teofil Lenartowicz Street Tenement house (19th century)

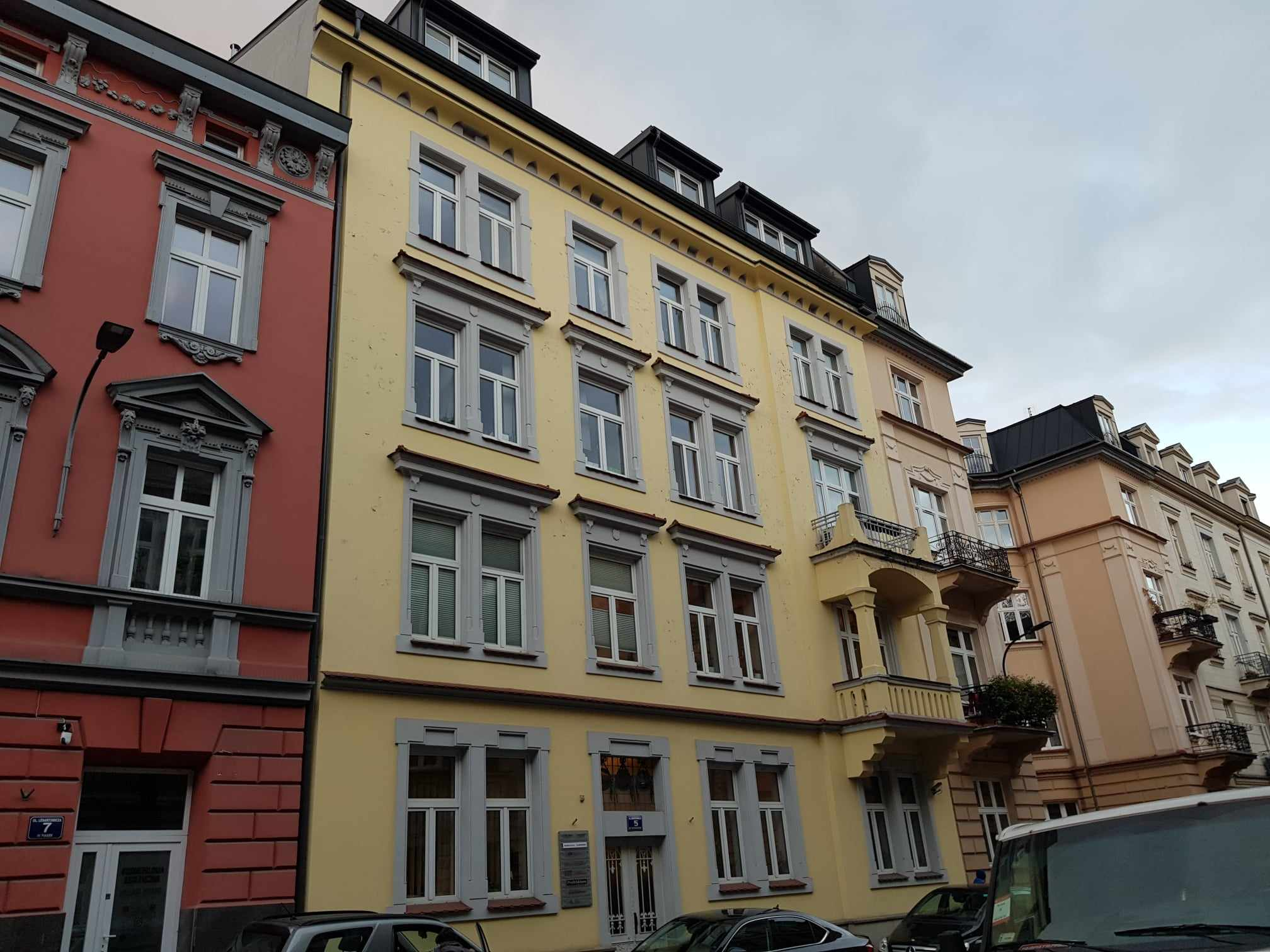
5 Teofil Lenartowicz Street Tenement house (20th century)

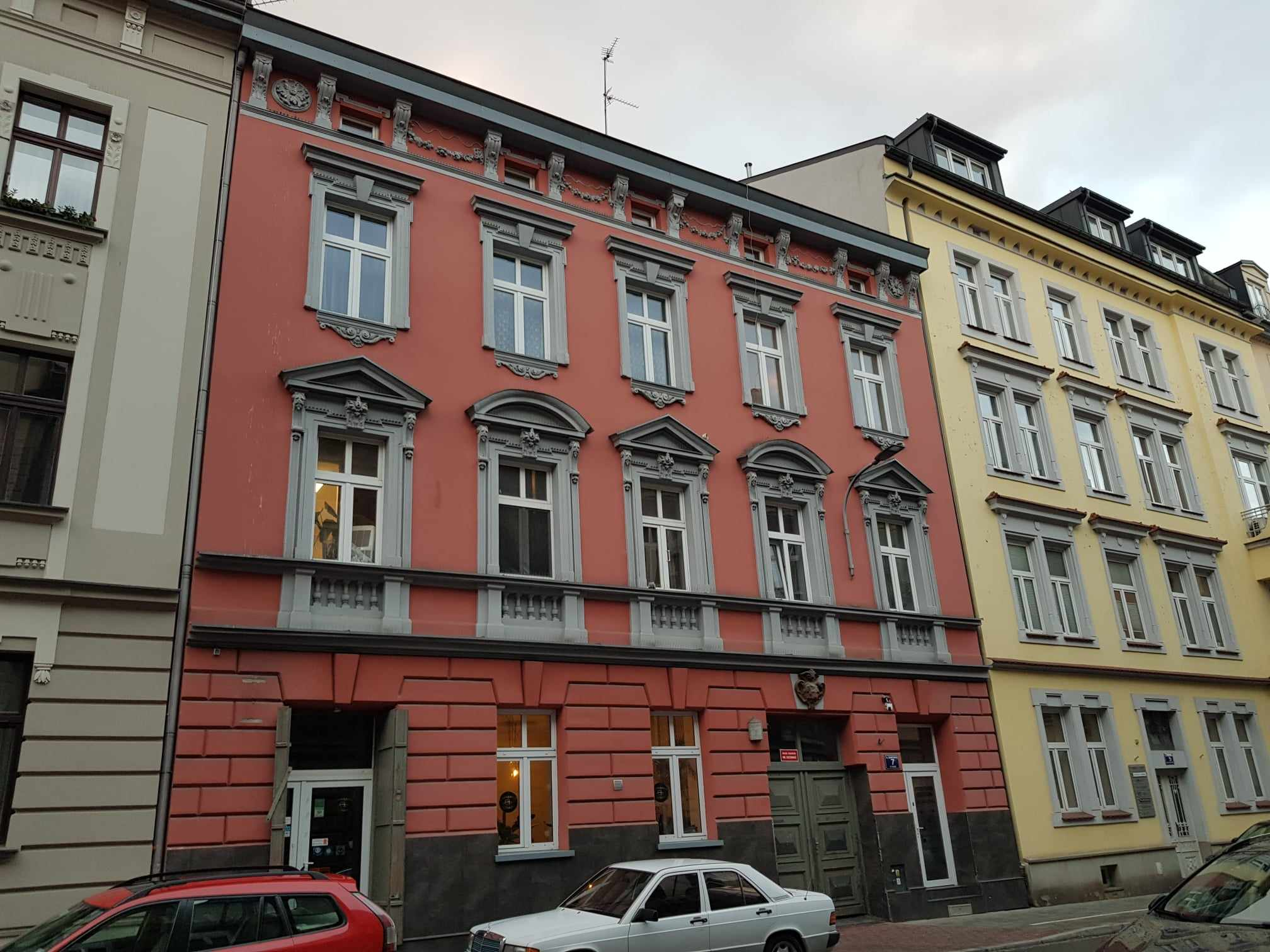
7 Teofil Lenartowicz Street Tenement house (19th century)

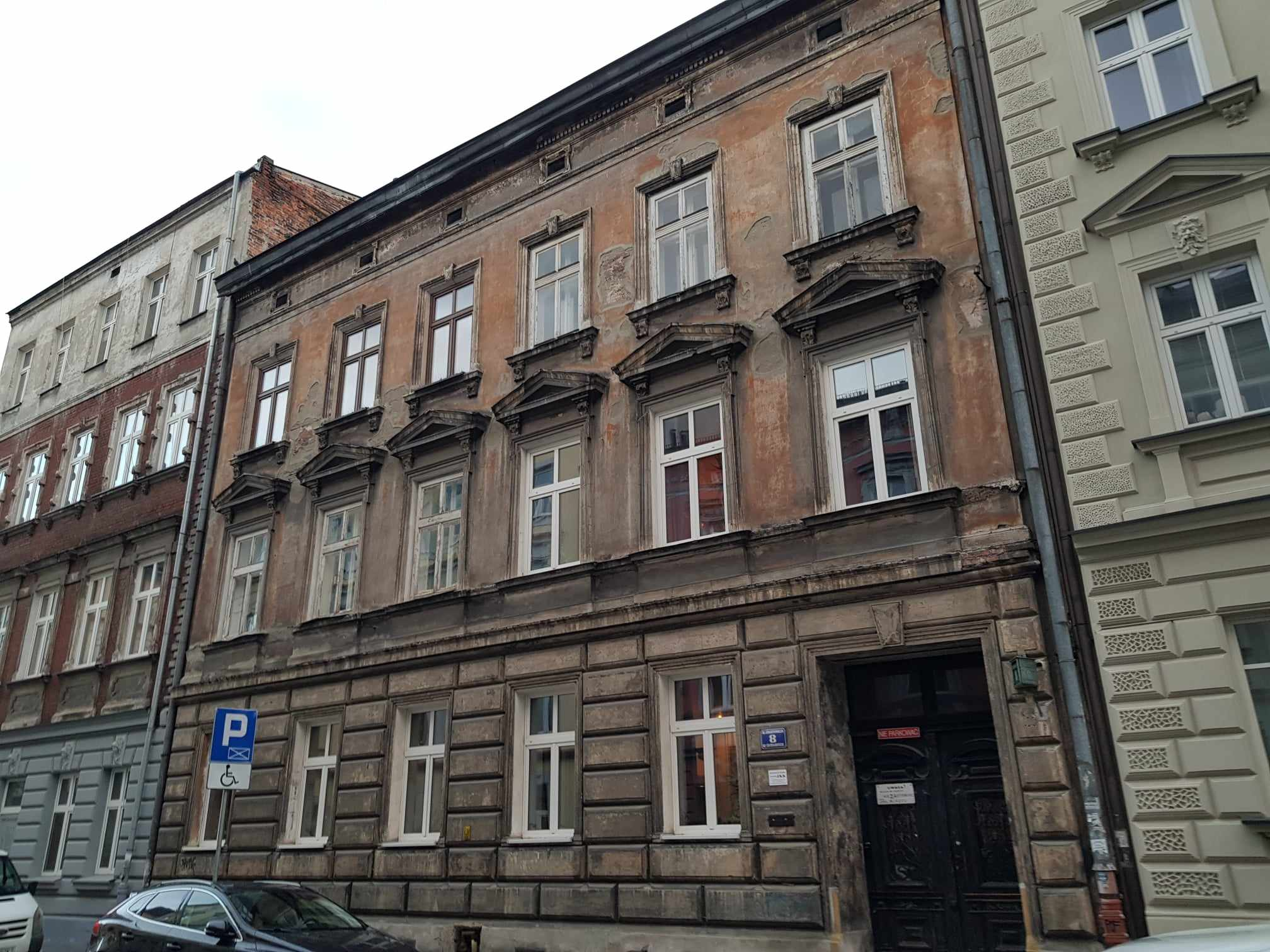
8 Teofil Lenartowicz Street Tenement house (19th century)

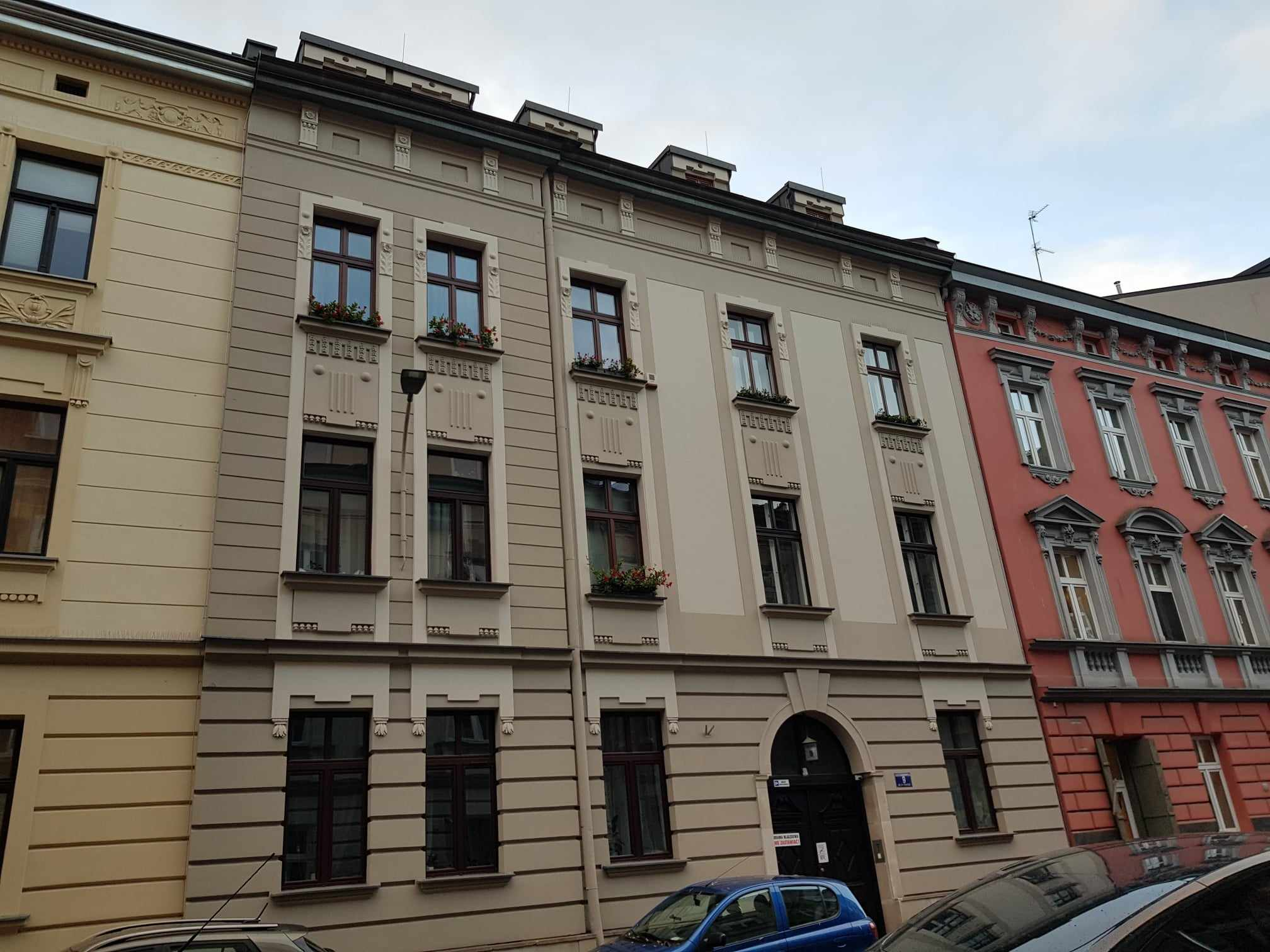
9 Teofil Lenartowicz Street Tenement house (20th century)

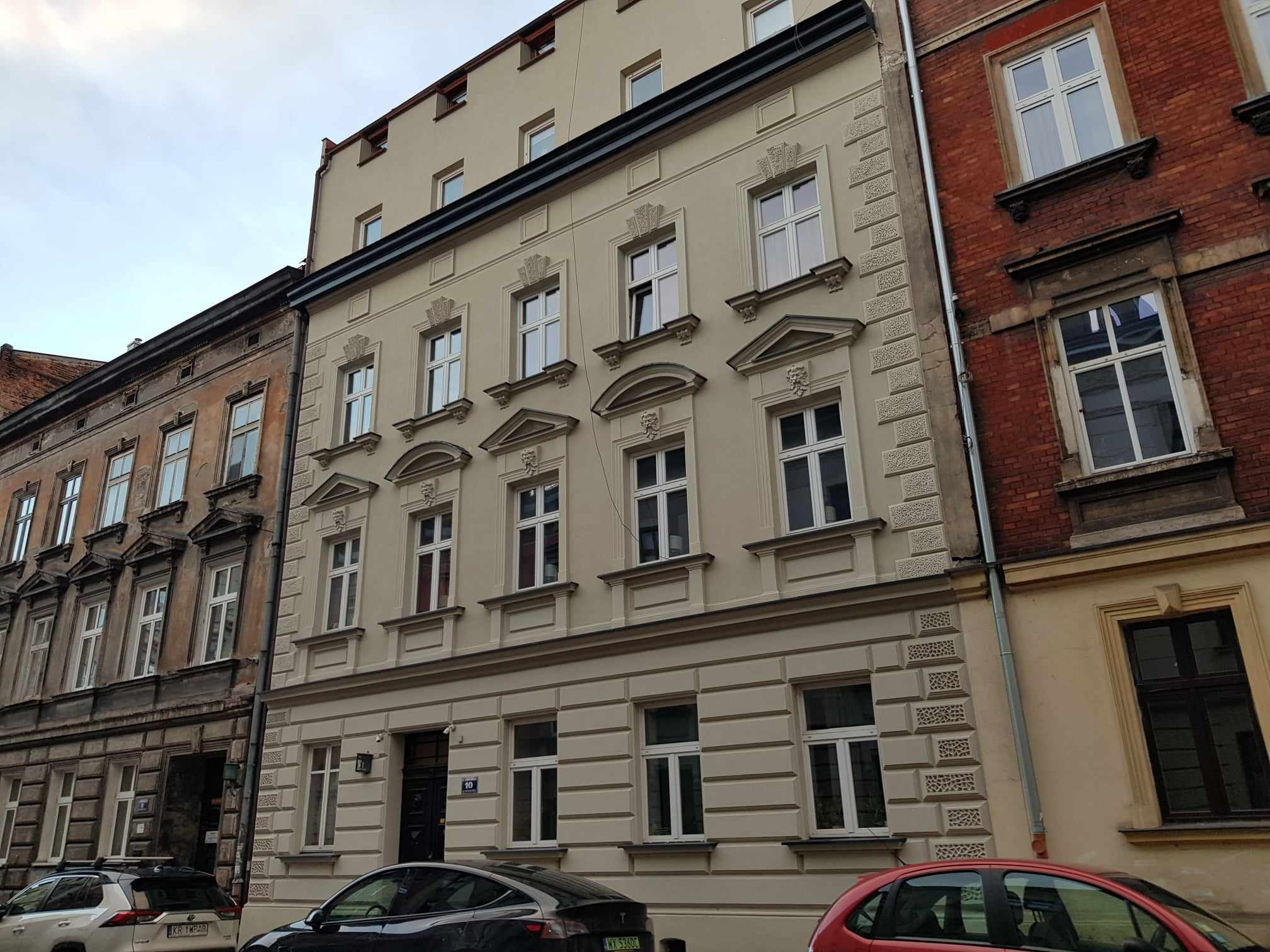
10 Teofil Lenartowicz Street Tenement house (19th century)

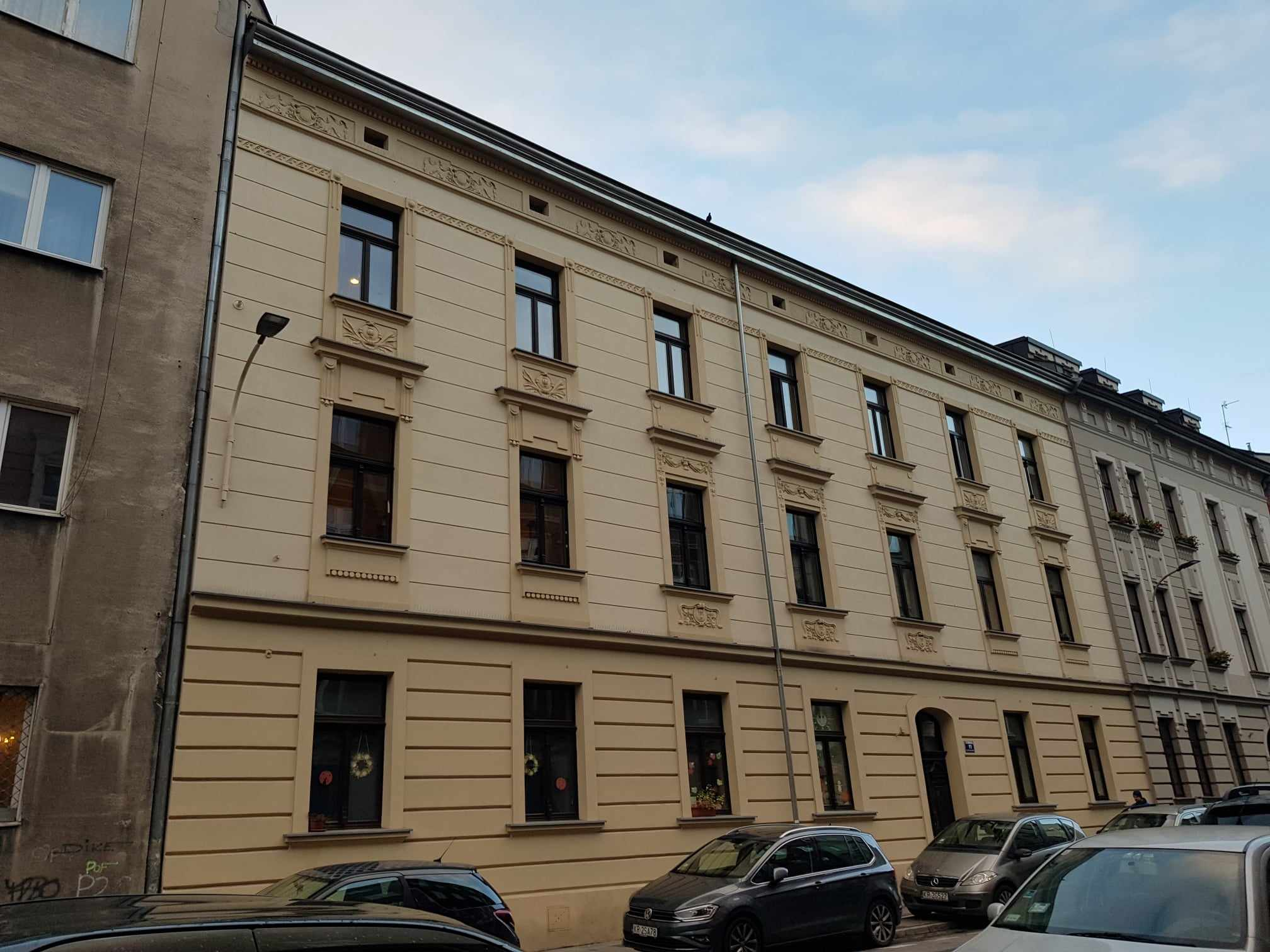
11 Teofil Lenartowicz Street Tenement house (19th century)

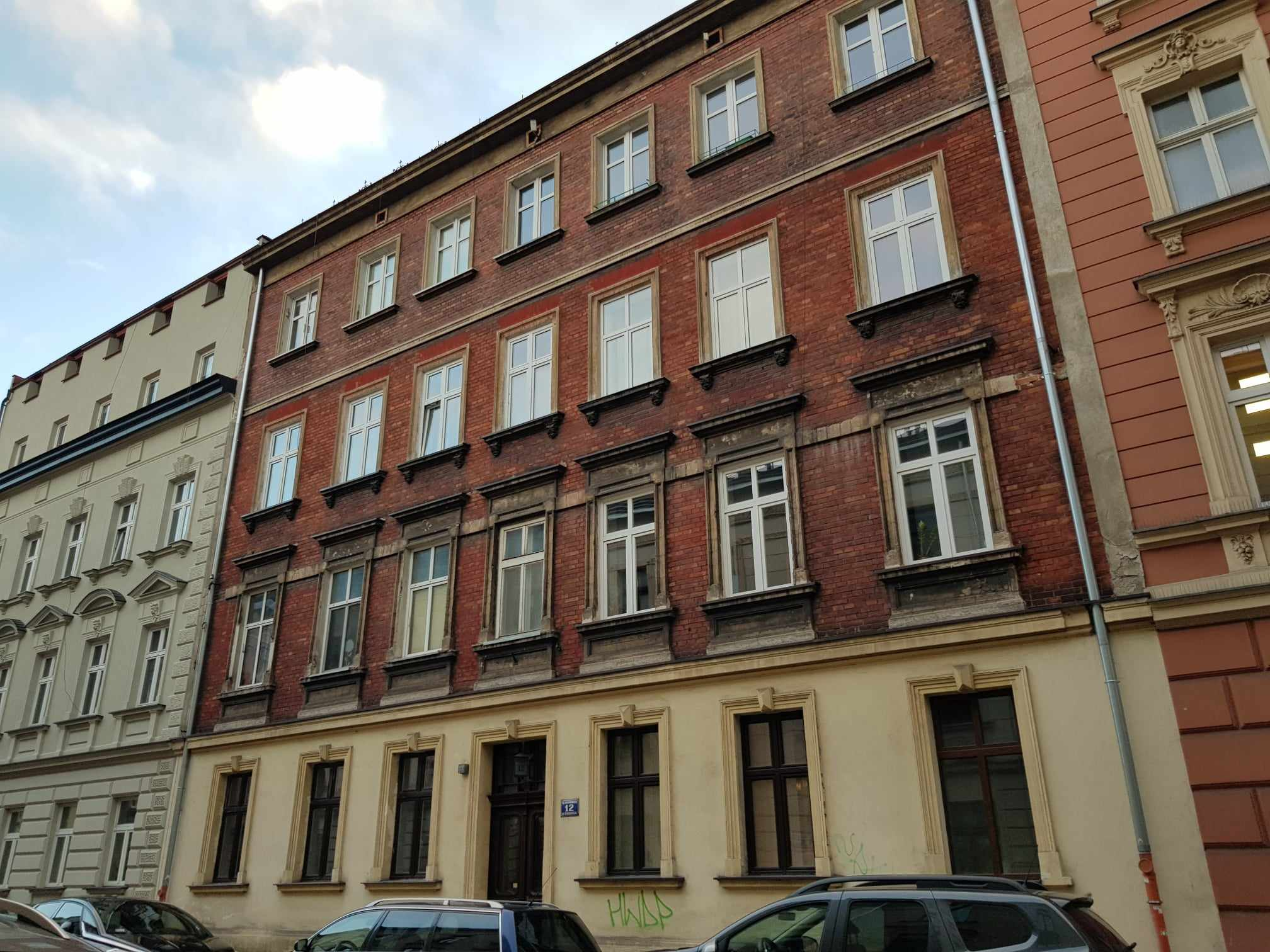
12 Teofil Lenartowicz Street Tenement house (19th century)

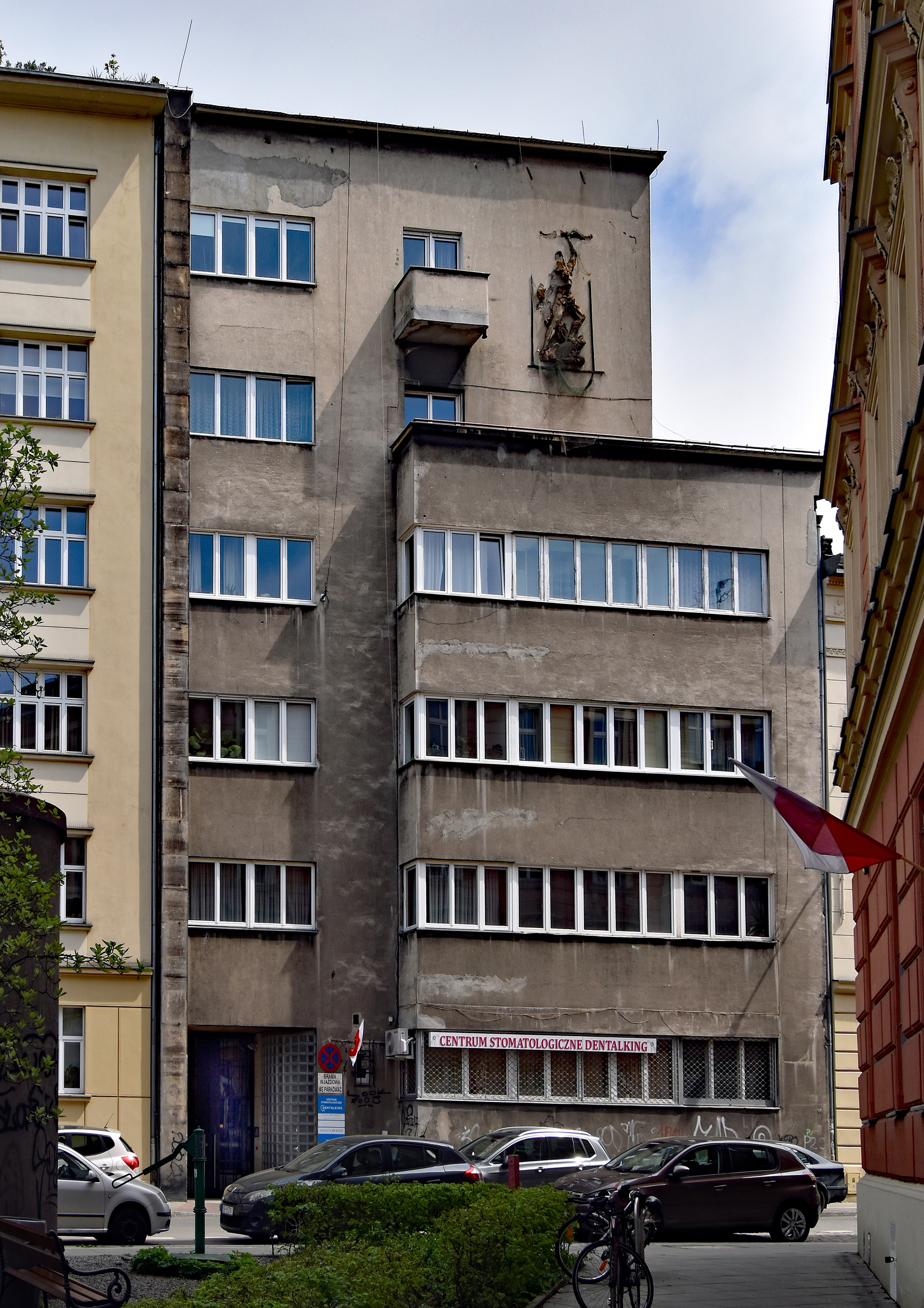
13 Teofil Lenartowicz Street
Modernist tenement house (functionalism)

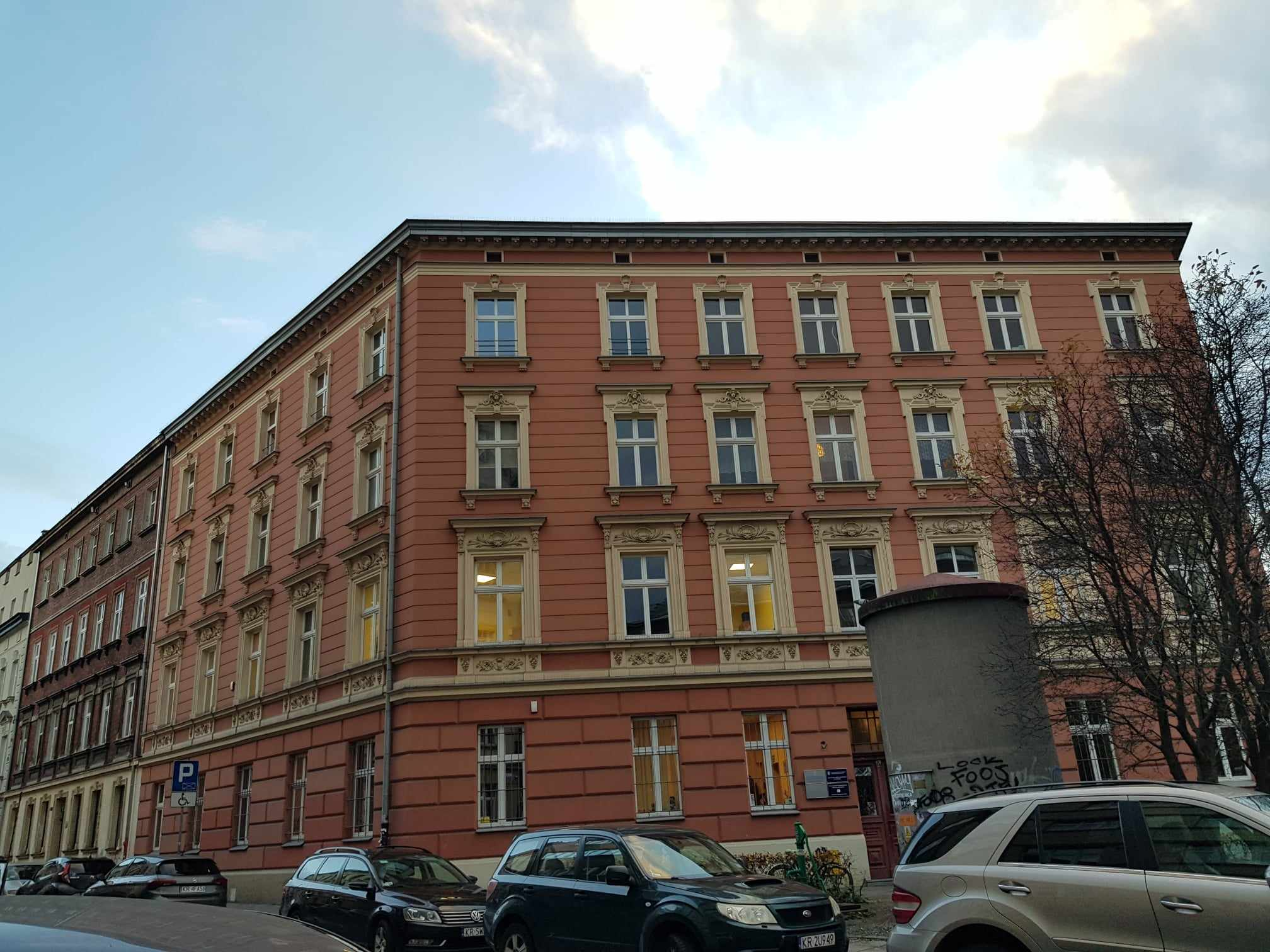
14 Teofil Lenartowicz Street Tenement house (1895–1896)

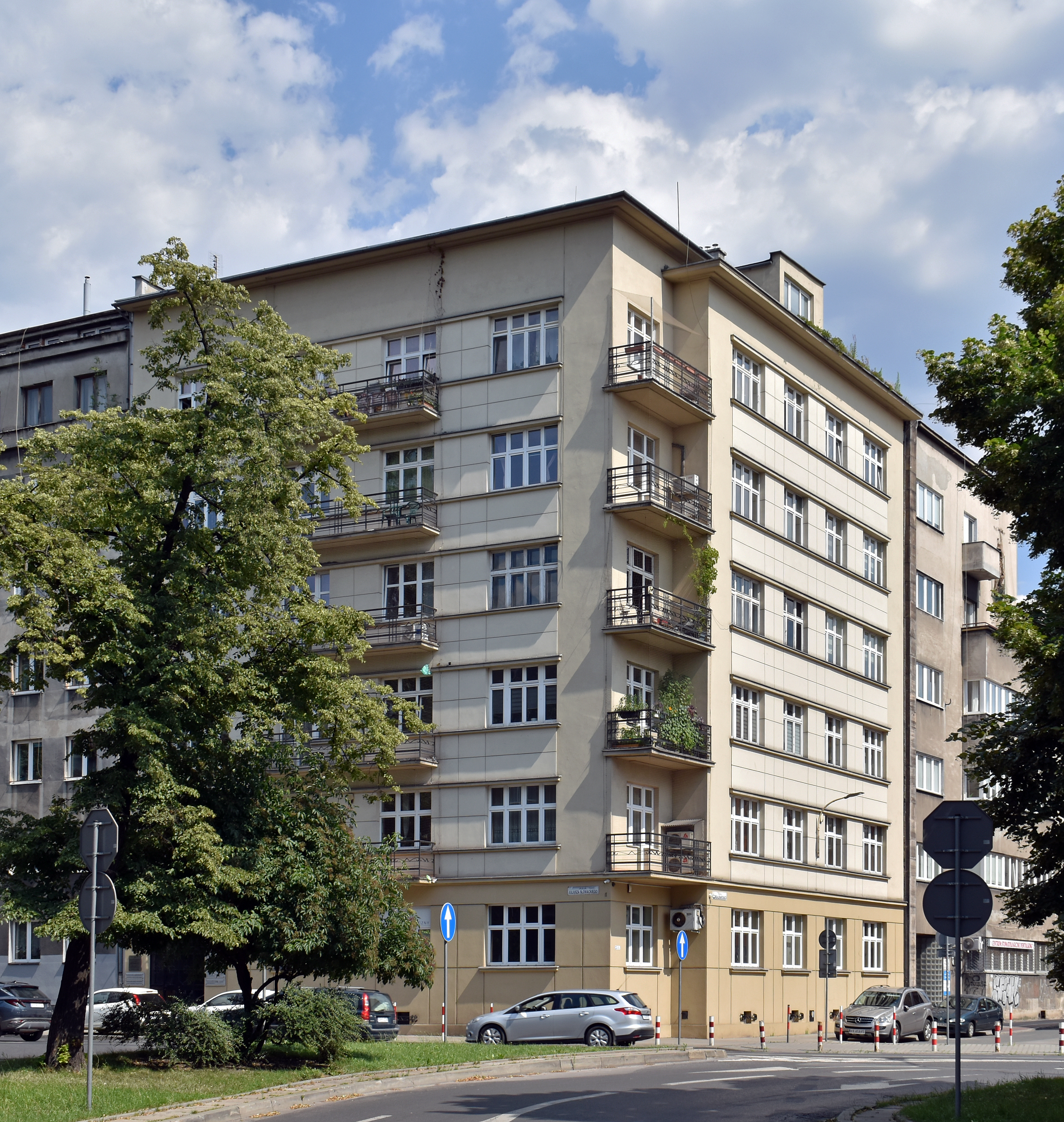
15 Teofil Lenartowicz Street
Modernist tenement house
