= Henryk Siemiradzki Street =

Street in Kraków, Poland

Henryka Siemiradzkiego street
Kraków
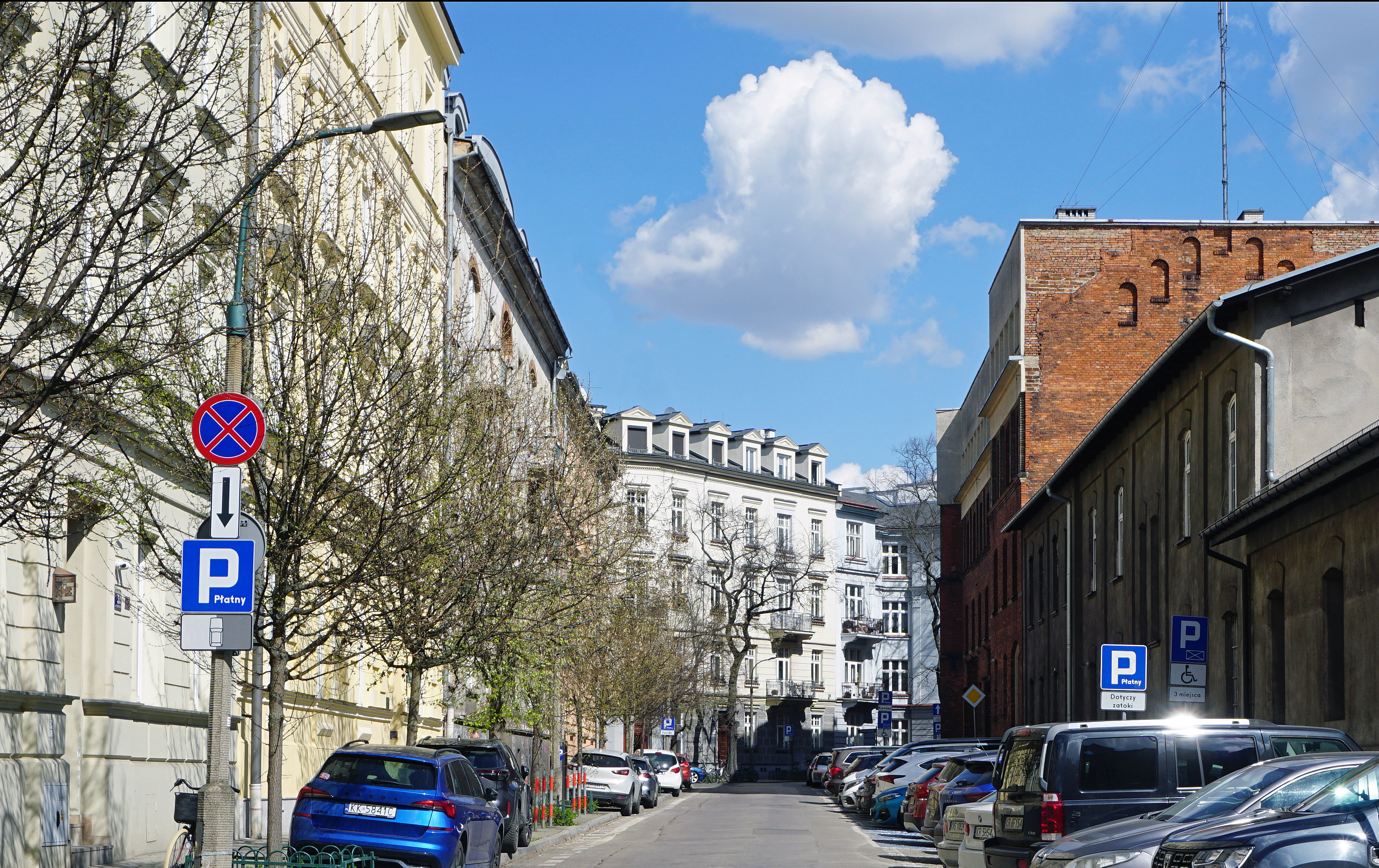
- View from the west, from Karmelicka Street
- Interactive map of Henryka Siemiradzkiego street
- Part of: Kraków Old Town district
- Owner: City of Kraków
- Location: Kraków, Poland

Henryk Siemiradzki Street is a street in Kraków, in District I Old Town, in Piasek. It runs parallel from Łobzowska Street to Karmelicka Street.

== History ==
The street was laid out at the end of the 1880s. It received its current name, commemorating the painter Henryk Siemiradzki, in 1890.

== Buildings ==
The street has the character of a small street with residential, tenement buildings, lined on one side with rows of trees. The street's buildings were originally almost entirely devoid of commercial functions, except for individual points in buildings located near intersections. Commercial premises were later added to tenement houses from the interwar period. The buildings are predominantly tenements in the historicist style, constructed in the 1890s. They are complemented by tenements built in the early 20th century, featuring modernist style elements, as well as functionalist tenements from the interwar period.

- 1 Henryk Siemiradzki Street (30 Łobzowska Street) – Former Dr. Jan Gwiazdomorski's Health House. Designed by Władysław Ekielski, 1889–1890. One of the first buildings constructed on the street, Stanisław Wyspiański died here on November 28, 1907. Currently, it houses the Rafał Czerwiakowski Gynecological and Obstetric Hospital.
- 2 Henryk Siemiradzki Street (28 Łobzowska Street) – The Turnau Tenement, built in the historicist style with fashionable forms of the so-called "Northern Renaissance" for Karolina Turnau. It serves as an urban dominant. Designed by Jan Zawiejski, 1889–1890.
- 3 Henryk Siemiradzki Street – Tenement with modernist architectural features. Designed by Władysław Kleinberger as his own residence, 1908.
- 4 Henryk Siemiradzki Street – Historicist-style tenement built for Ludwik Turnau. Designed by Karol Rybiński, 1890–1891.
- 5 Henryk Siemiradzki Street – Tenement with modernist architectural features. Teodor Axentowicz lived here. Designed by Władysław Kaczmarski, 1906–1907.
- 6 Henryk Siemiradzki Street – Eclectic-style tenement. Designed by Stefan Ertel, 1893.
- 8 Henryk Siemiradzki Street – Tenement in the form of a Renaissance villa, set back from the street, with a garden on its front side, built for J. Mularski. Designed by Leopold Tlachna, 1892–1893.
- 9 Henryk Siemiradzki Street – Historicist-style tenement. Designed by Henryk de Laveaux, around 1893–1894.
- 10 Henryk Siemiradzki Street – Tenement in a similar form to the neighboring building at Siemiradzki Street 8, set back from the street, with a garden in front of the facade. Designed by Leopold Tlachna, 1892–1893.
- 11 Henryk Siemiradzki Street – Eclectic-style tenement. Designed by Beniamin Torbe, 1893.
- 12 Henryk Siemiradzki Street – Tenement with modernist architectural features. Designed by Beniamin Torbe, 1905.
- 14 Henryk Siemiradzki Street – Eclectic-style tenement. Built between 1891 and 1892.
- 16 Henryk Siemiradzki Street – Historicist-style tenement built for J. Ciesielski, decorated with a medallion featuring a bust of Tadeusz Kościuszko on the facade. Designed by Karol Żychoń, 1891–1892.
- 18a Henryk Siemiradzki Street (24 Jan Sobieski Street) – Modernist-style tenement with a corner in the form of a three-sided, recessed bay window. It serves as an urban dominant at the intersection with Sobieskiego Street. Designed by Stanisław Mehl, 1934–1935.
- 19 Henryk Siemiradzki Street – Art Nouveau tenement with a plant motif carved into the facade. Built between 1910 and 1911.
- 20a Henryk Siemiradzki Street – Modernist-style tenement with bas-relief decorations on the facade. Designed by Alfred Düntuch and Stanisław Landsberger, 1936–1938.
- 21 Henryk Siemiradzki Street – Art Nouveau tenement with a facade decorated with sunflower motifs. Built in 1911.
- 22 Henryk Siemiradzki Street – Villa, currently part of the complex of buildings of the Municipal Police Headquarters. Designed by Jozue Oberleder, 1922.
- 23 Henryk Siemiradzki Street – Tenement with a recessed pentagonal facade and a small garden in the center. Designed by Artur Romanowski, 1911–1912.
- 24 Henryk Siemiradzki Street – Former National Defense Barracks – the main building and a row of three front buildings on the western side. Currently, it houses the Municipal Police Headquarters. Designed by Janusz Niedziałkowski, 1892–1894.
- 25 Henryk Siemiradzki Street (1 Teofil Lenartowicz Street) – Art Nouveau-style tenement. Designed by Kazimierz Zieliński, 1911–1912.
- 29 Henryk Siemiradzki Street – Tenement with modernist architectural features, decorated with flower baskets on the facade. Designed by Rajmund Meus and Bronisław Górski, 1909–1910.
- 31 Henryk Siemiradzki Street – Historicist-style tenement. Designed by Bronisław Müller, 1890. In 1920, it was rebuilt by the Association for the Care of Girls of St. Joseph. Currently, it serves as a Girls' Orphanage.
- 35 Henryk Siemiradzki Street (53 Karmelicka Street) – Historicist-style tenement. Designed by Bronisław Müller, 1881.
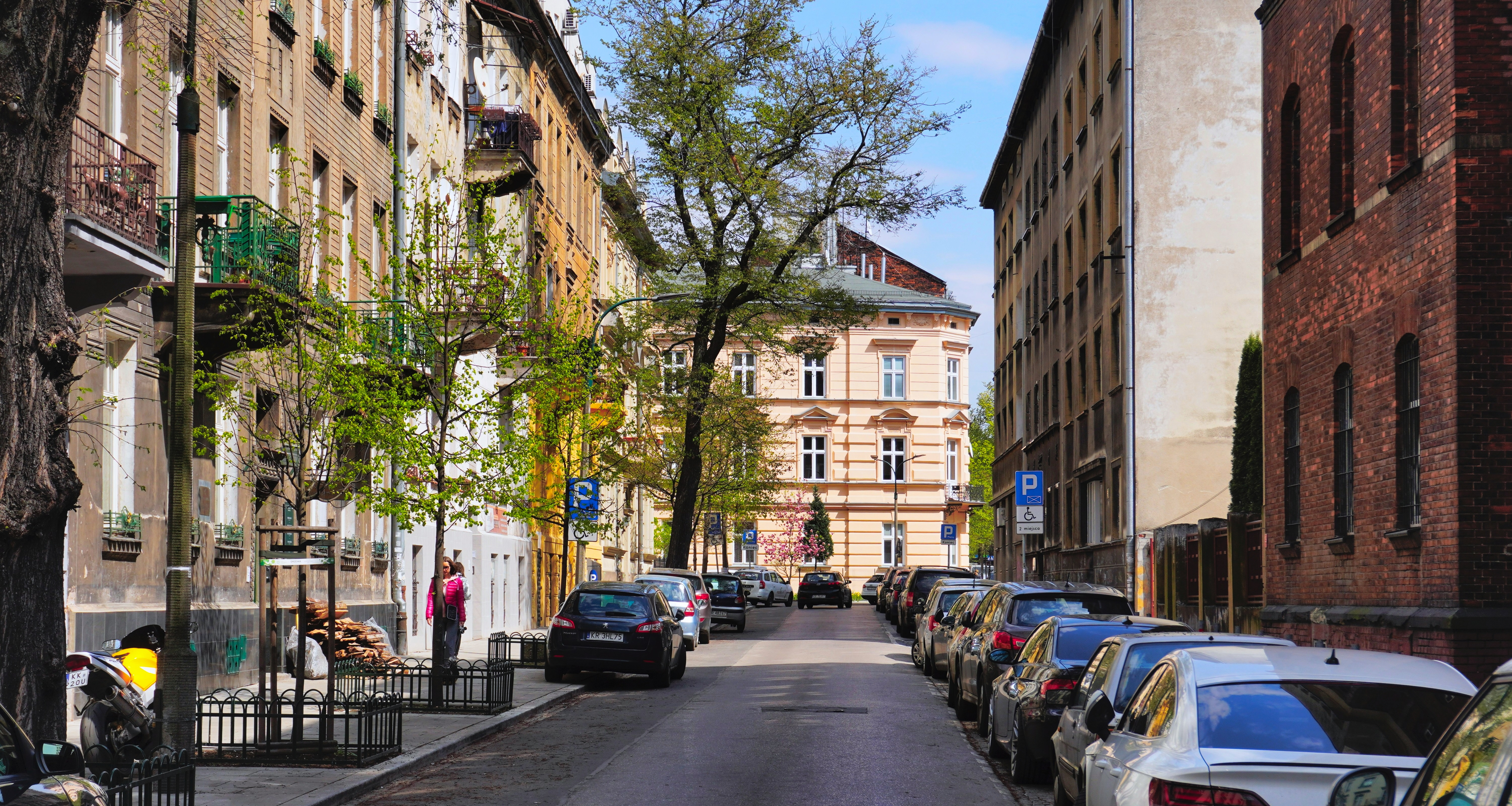
View from the intersection with Teofil Lenartowicz Street to the east

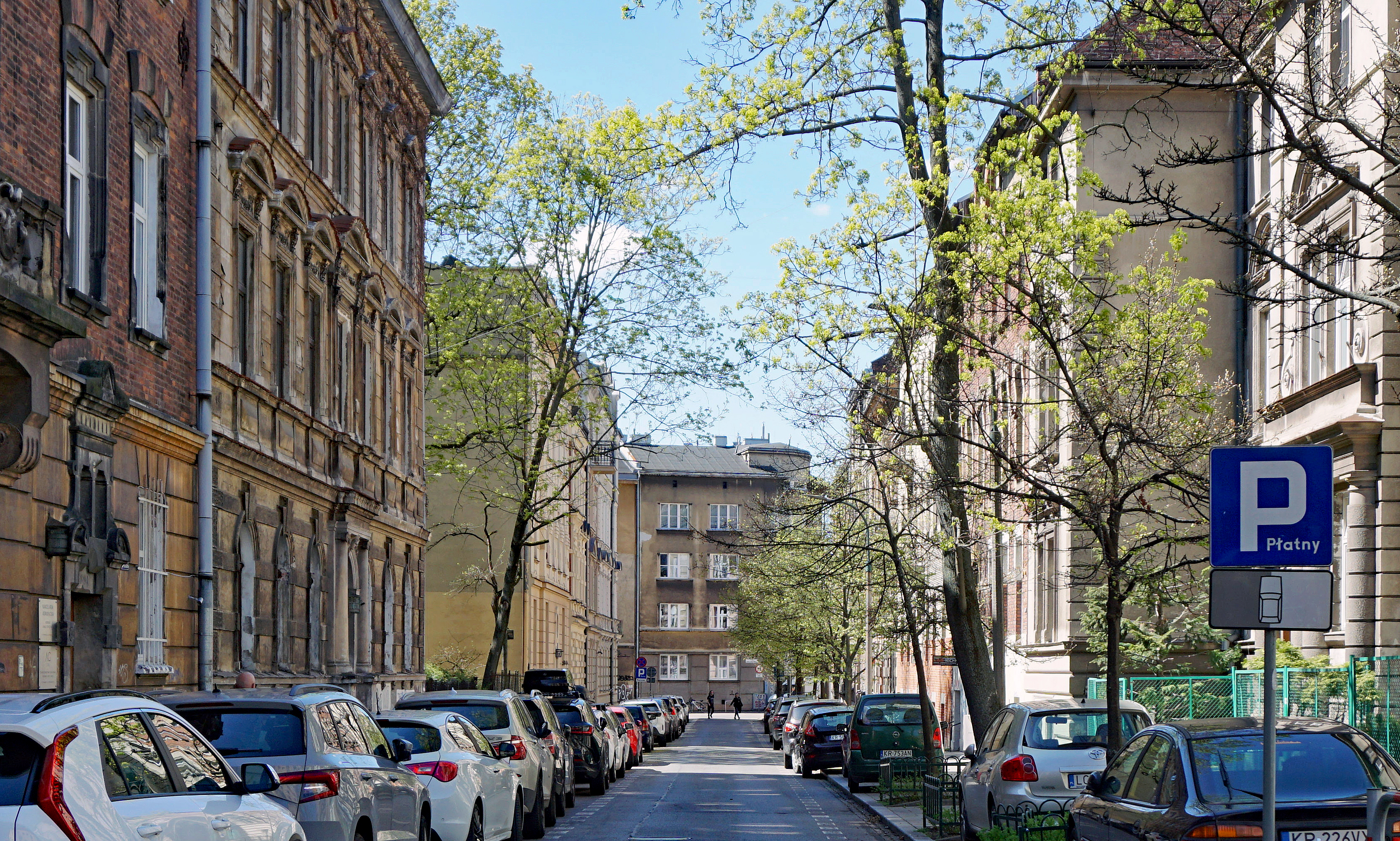
View from the intersection with Łobzowska Street to the west

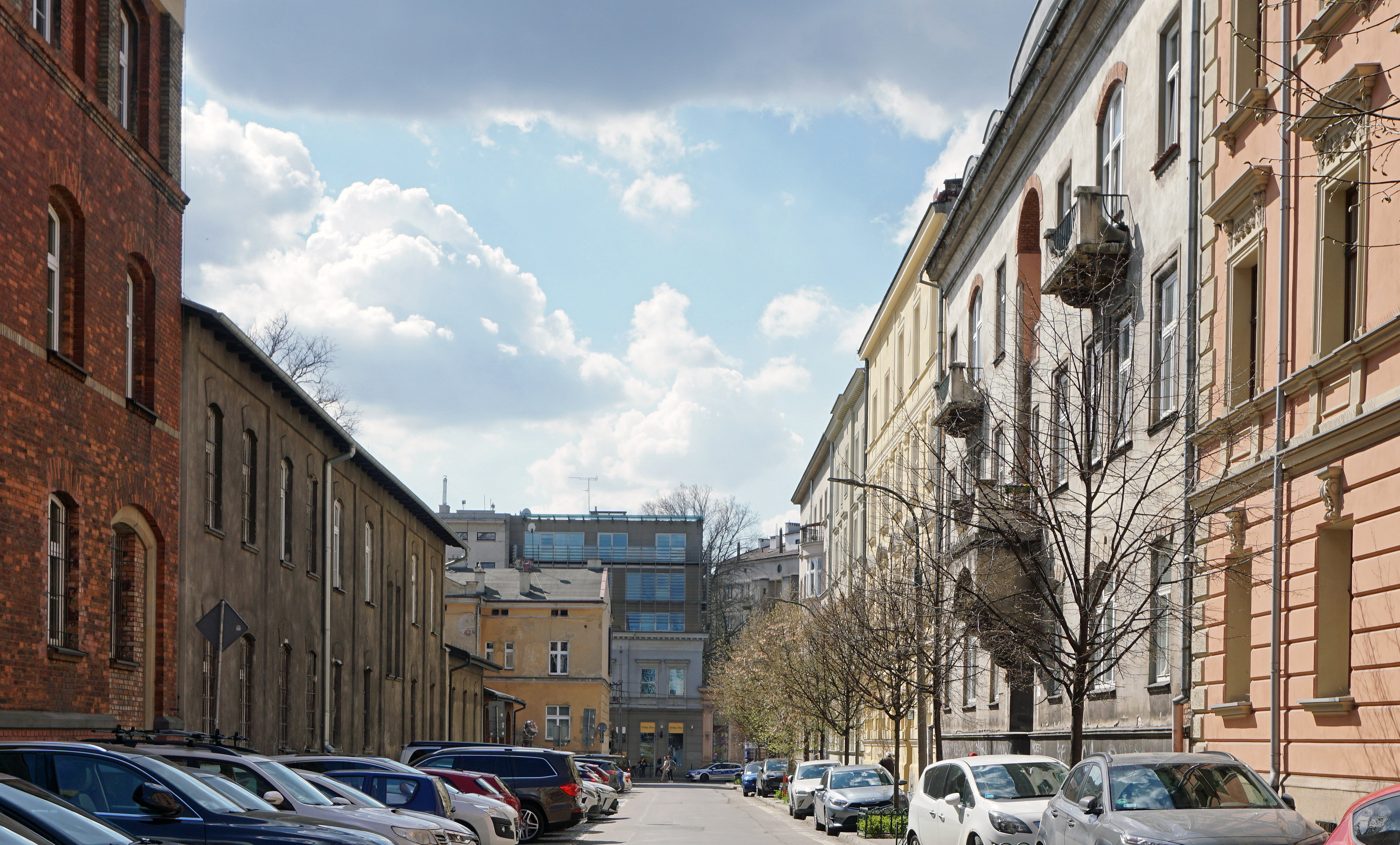
View from the intersection with Teofil Lenartowicz Street to the west

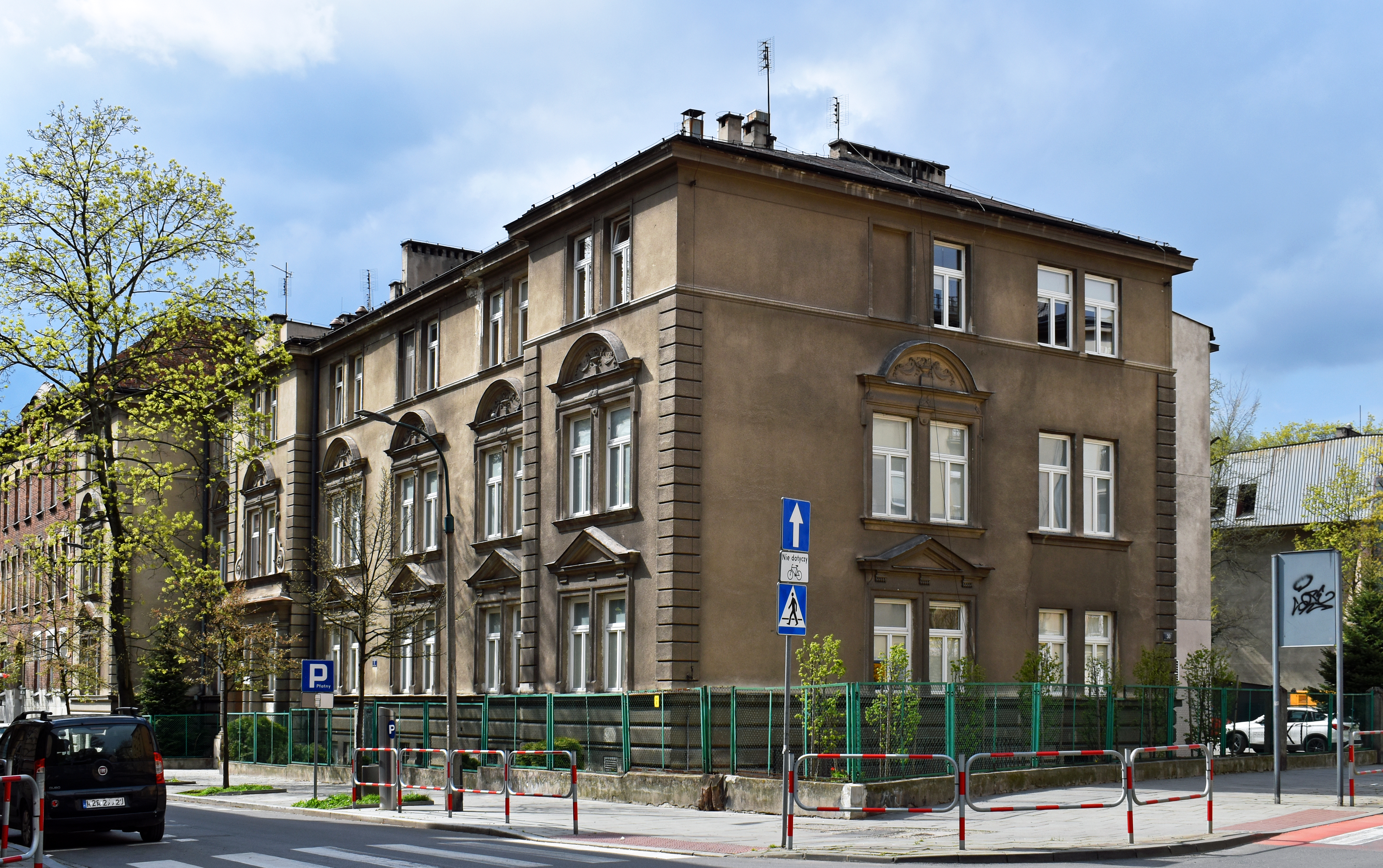
1 Henryk Siemiradzki Street (30 Łobzowska Street)
The former Health Home of Dr. Gwiazdomorski

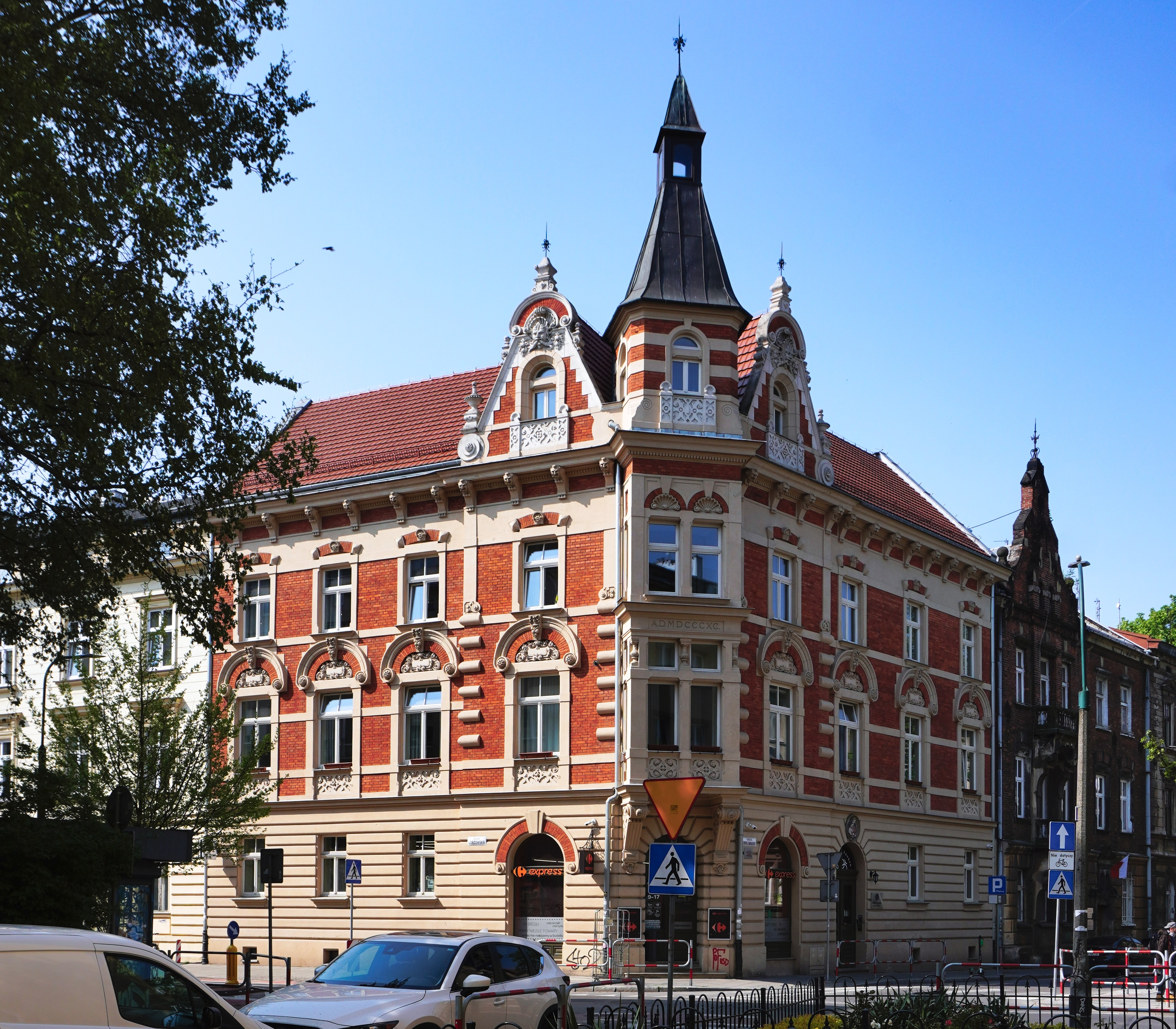
2 Henryk Siemiradzki Street (28 Łobzowska Street)
Tenement Turnauów (design. Jan Zawiejski, 1889–1890)

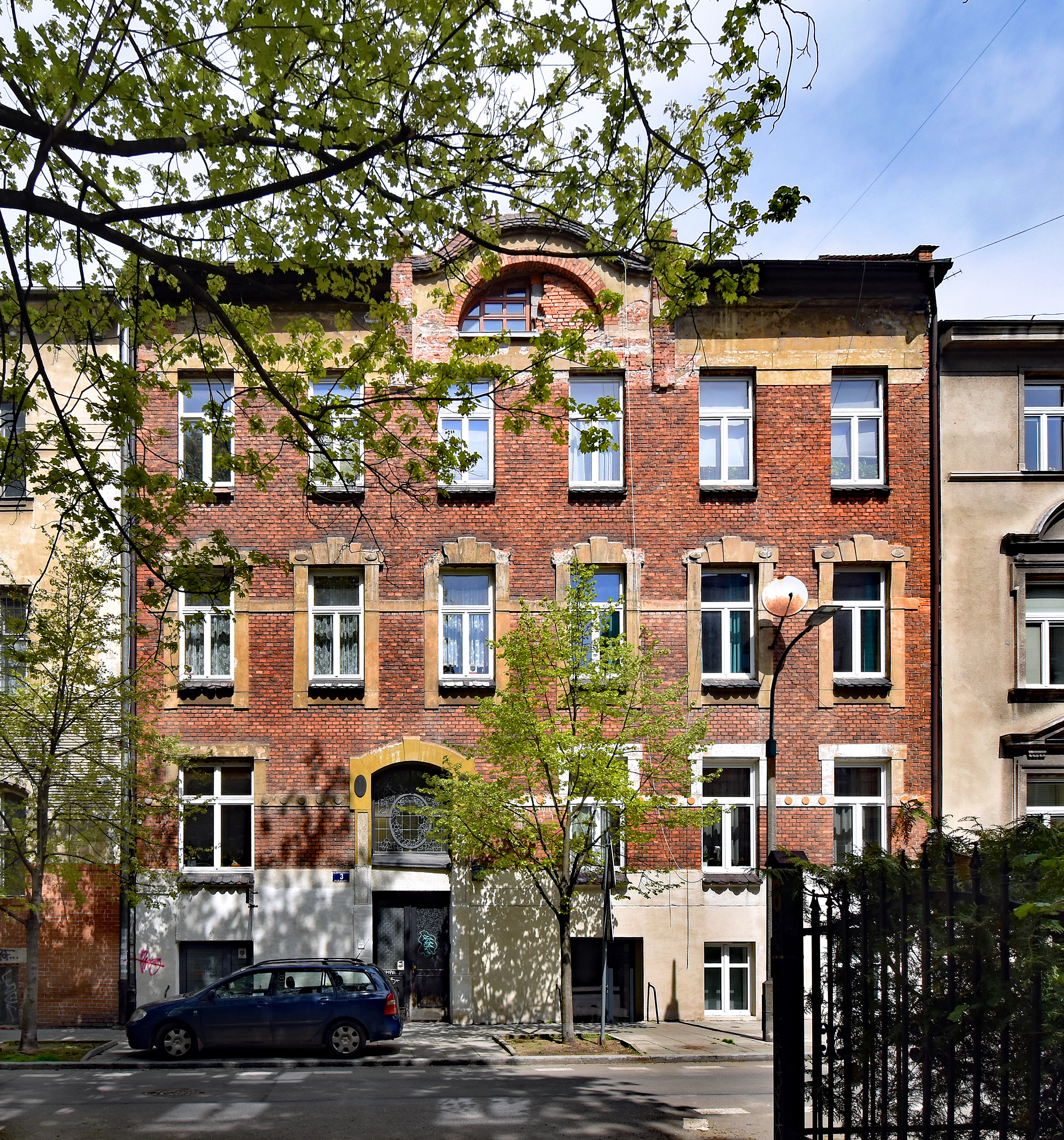
3 Henryk Siemiradzki Street
Kleinberger's tenement house

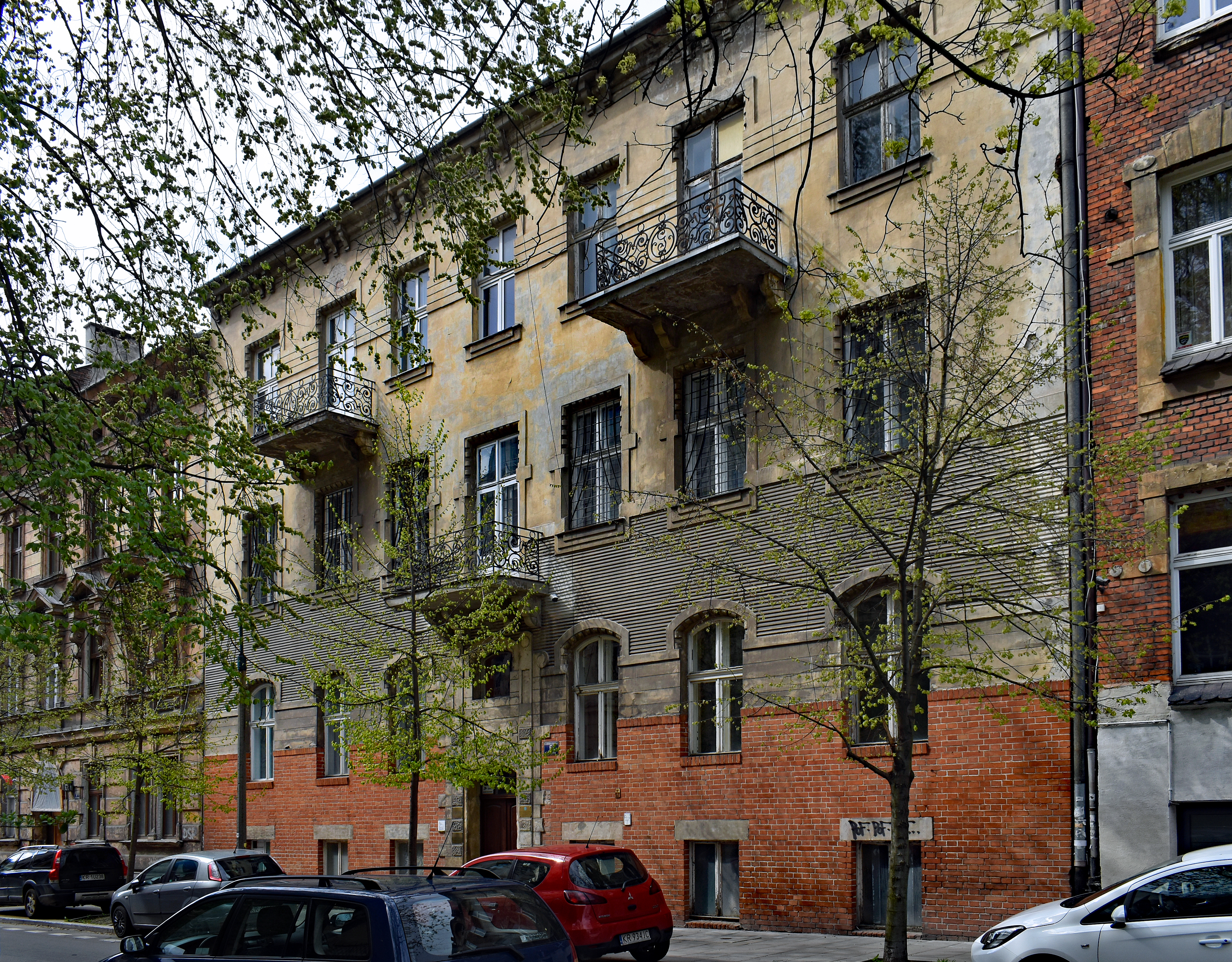
5 Henryk Siemiradzki Street
Tenement house

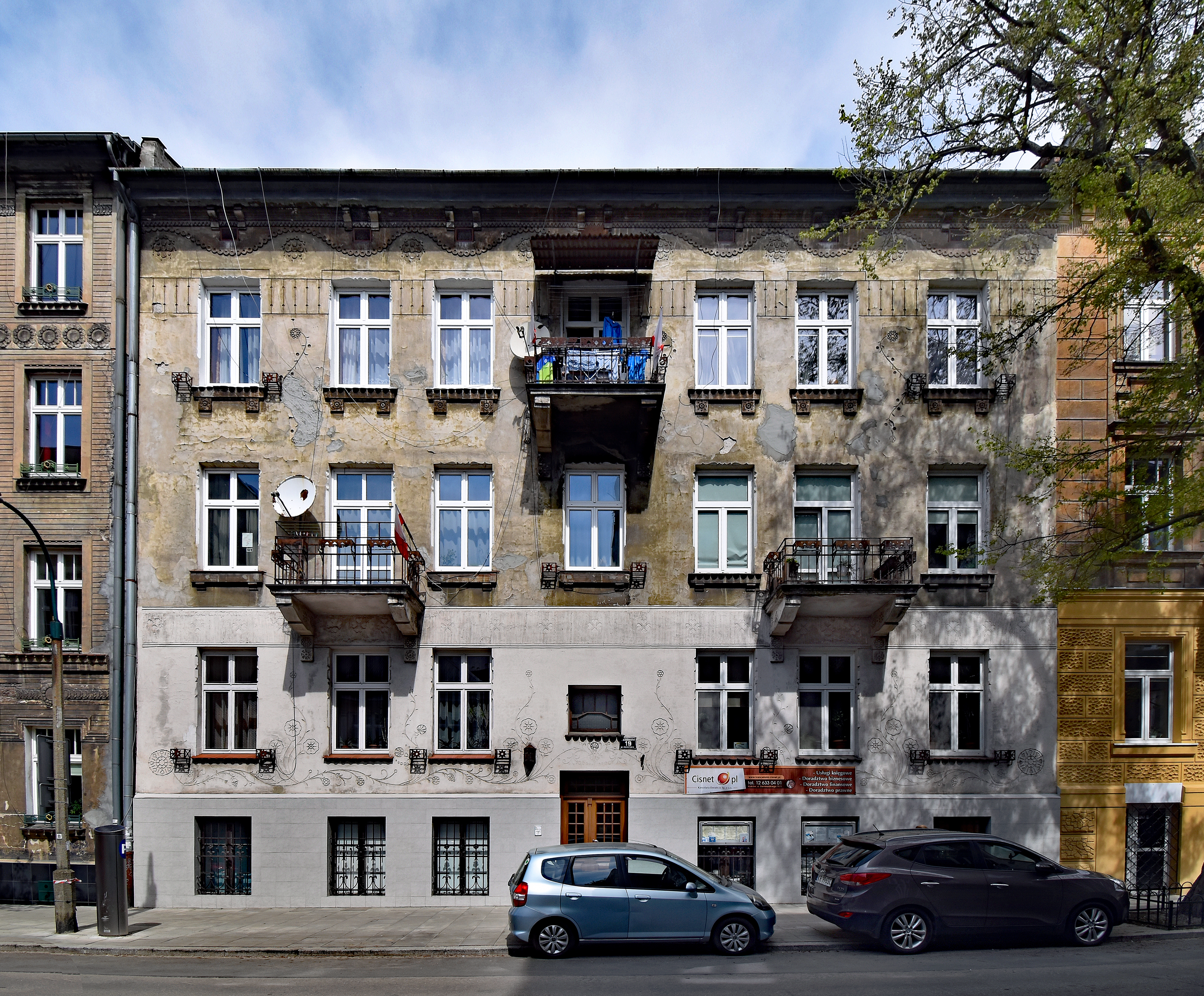
19 Henryk Siemiradzki Street
Tenement house

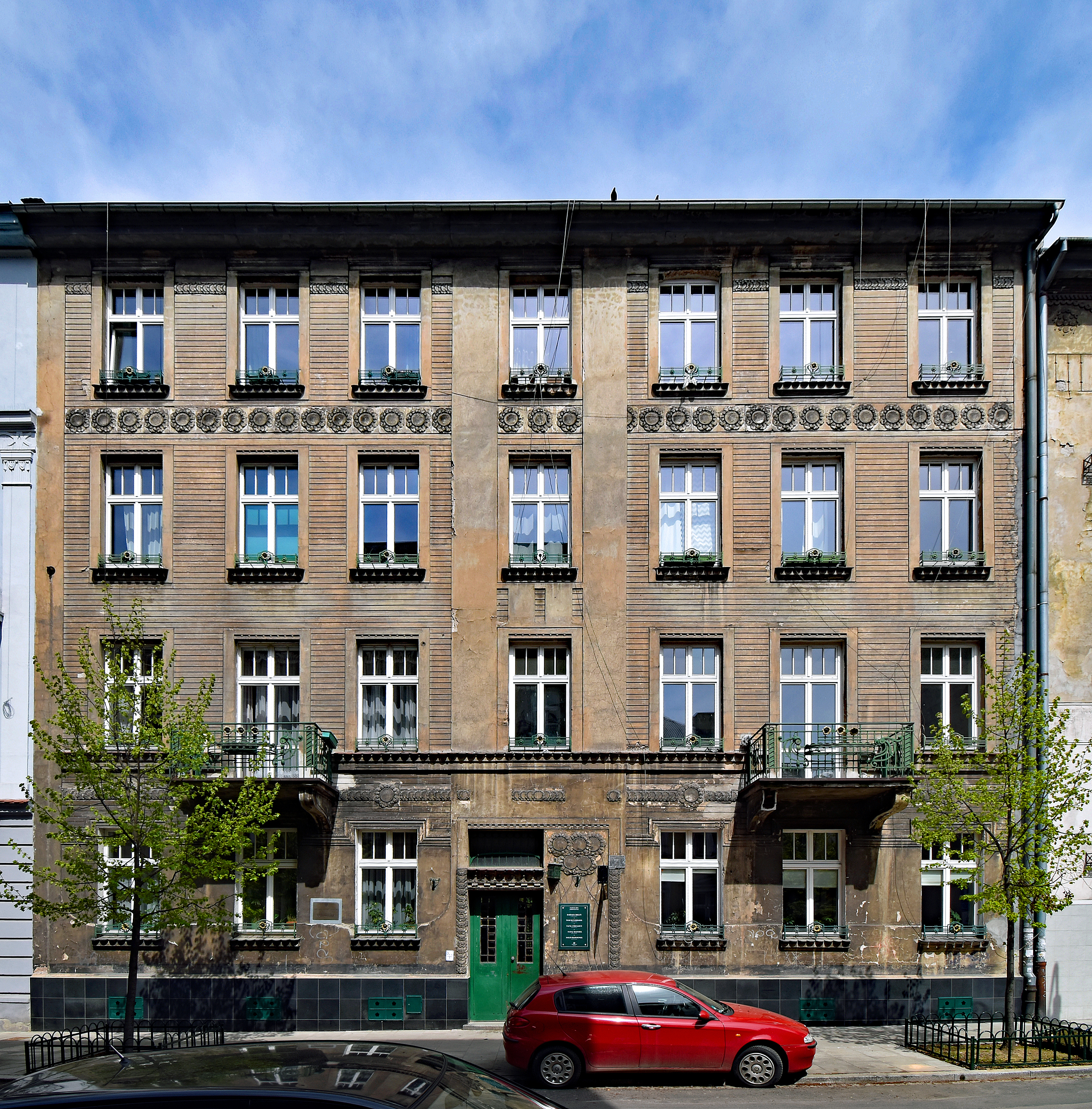
21 Henryk Siemiradzki Street
A tenement house with a facade decorated with sunflowers

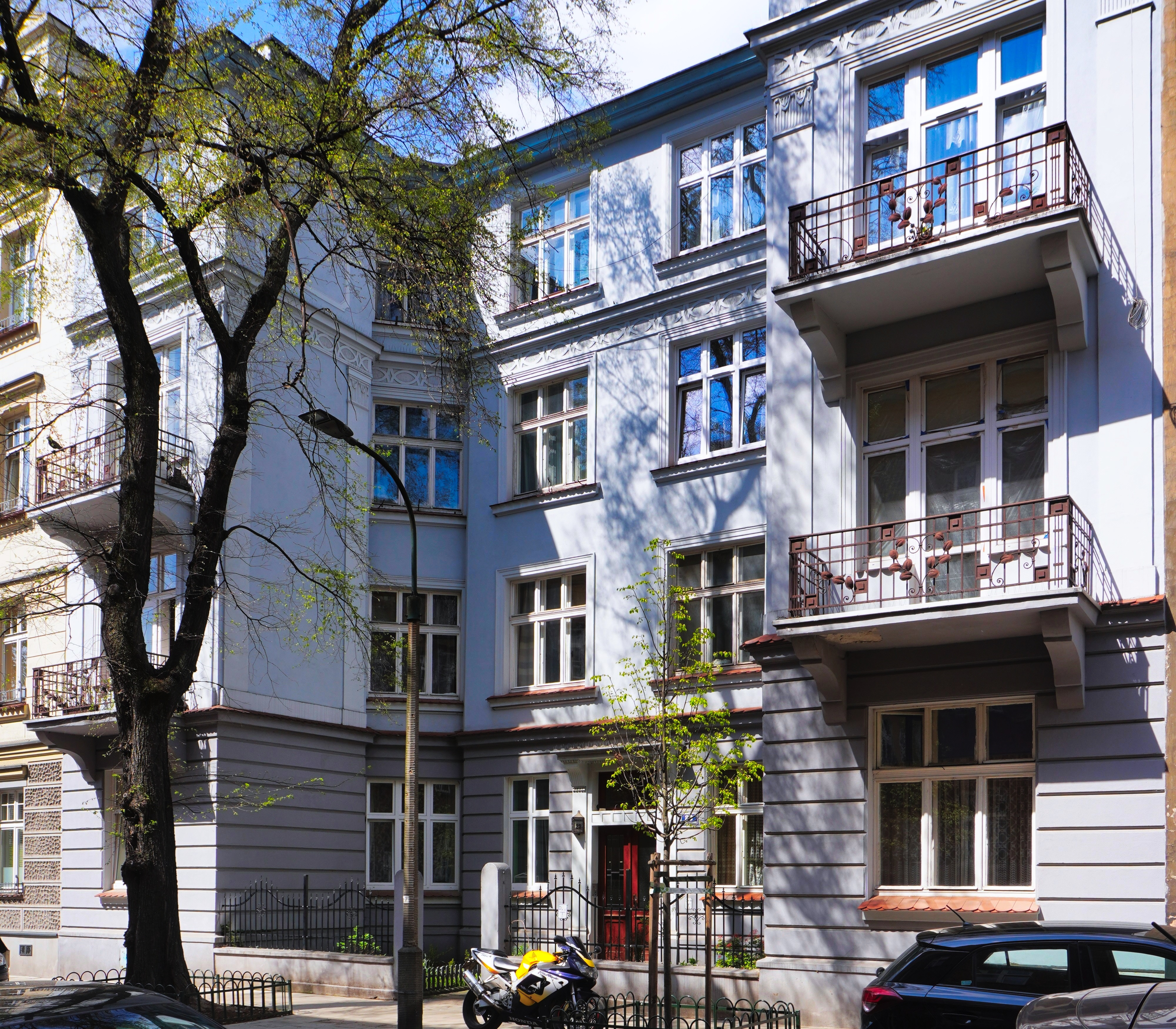
23 Henryk Siemiradzki Street
Tenement house (design. Artur Romanowski, 1911–1912)

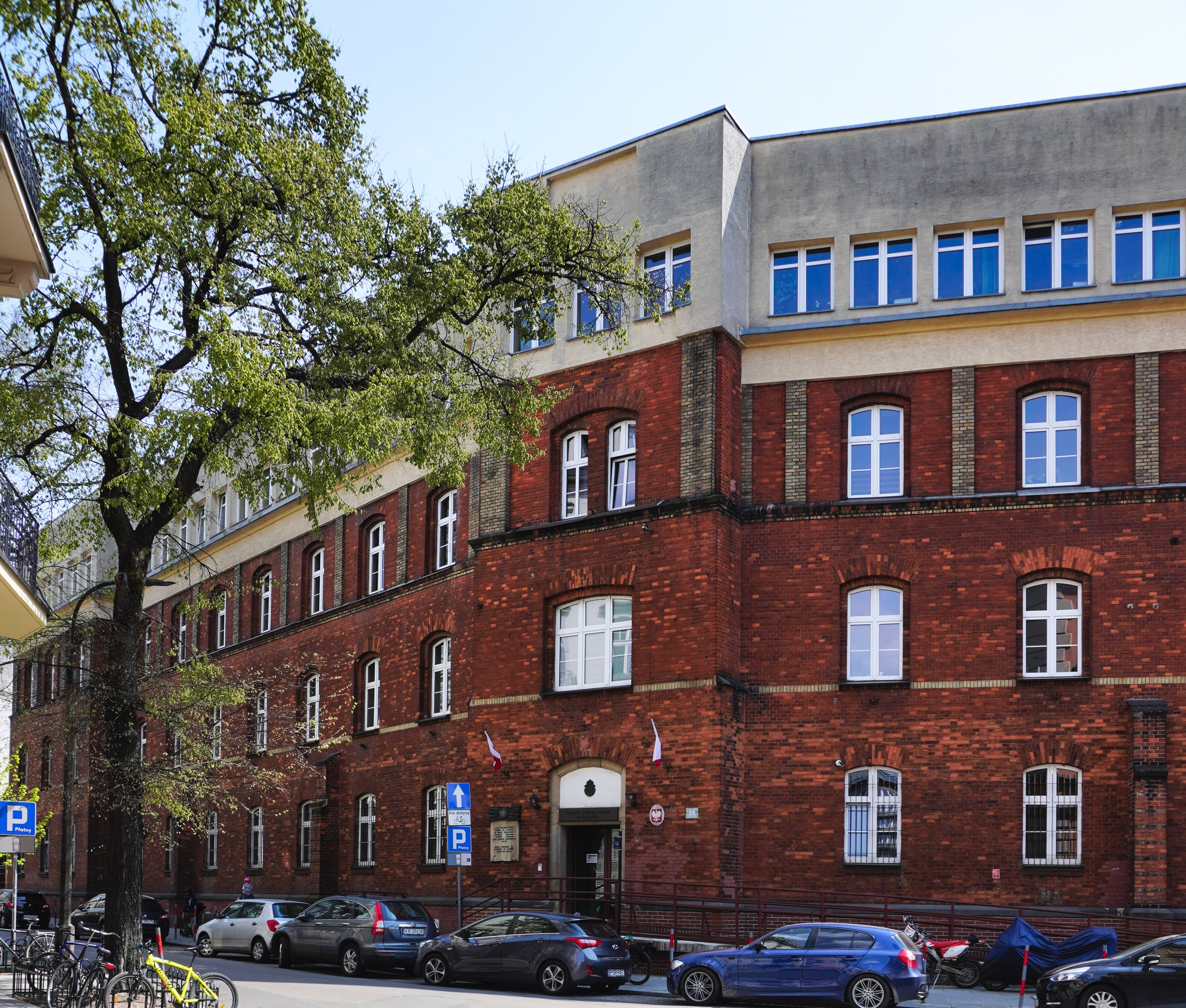
24 Henryk Siemiradzki Street
Former Home Defense Barracks, currently the Municipal Police Headquarters (design. Janusz Niedziałkowski, 1892–1894)

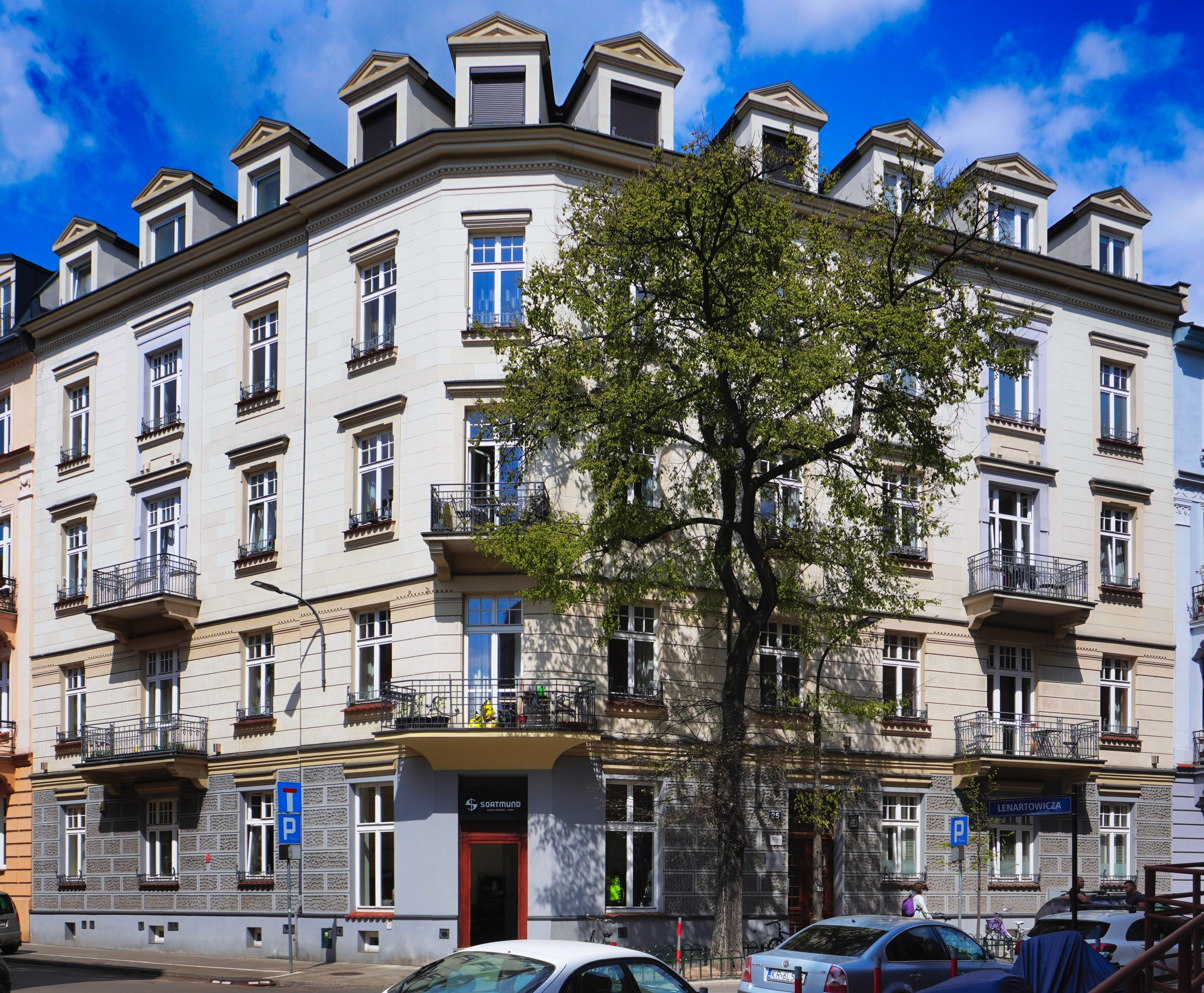
25 Henryk Siemiradzki Street (1 Teofil Lenartowicz Street)
Tenement house (design. Kazimierz Zieliński, 1911–1912)

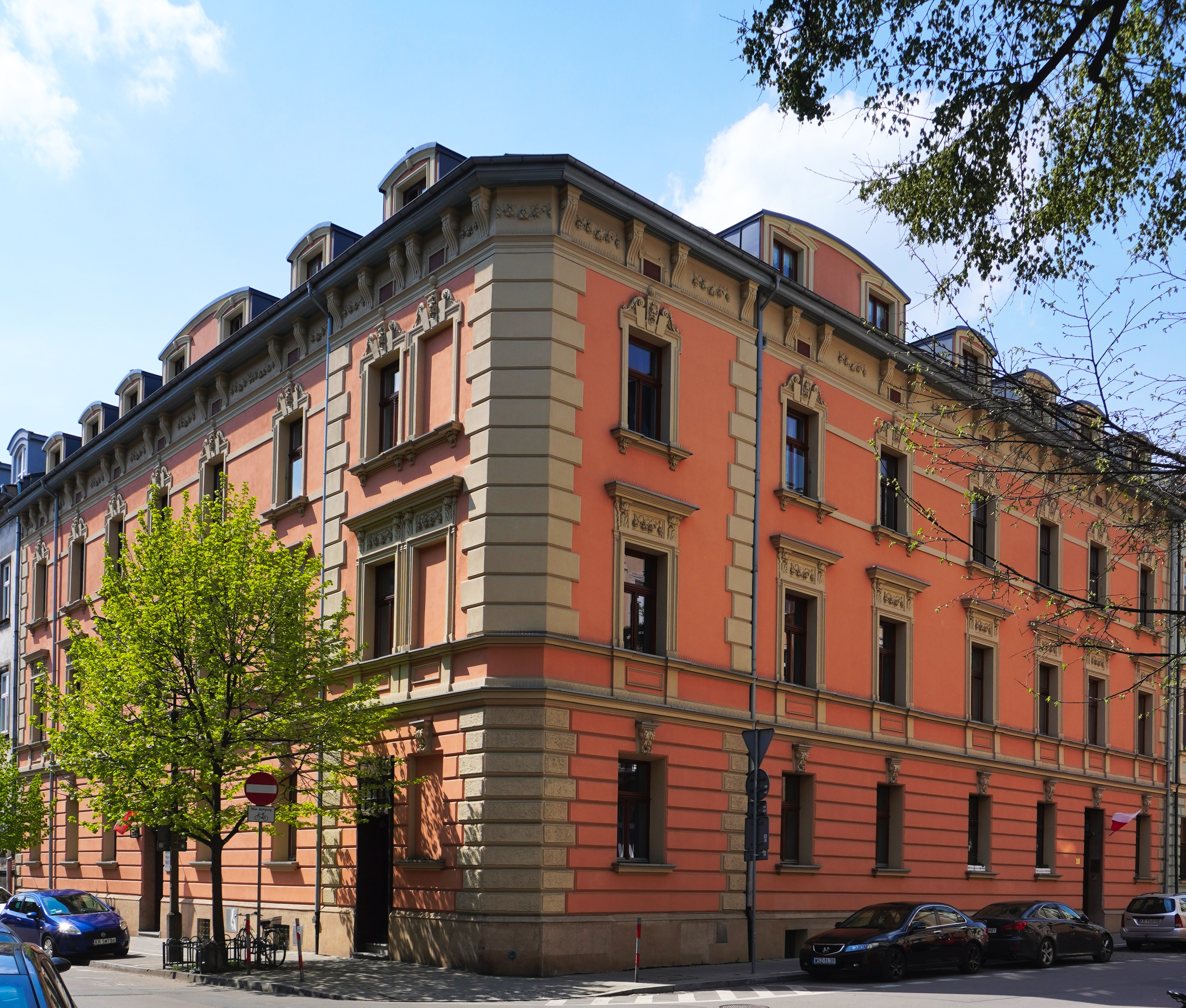
27 Henryk Siemiradzki Street (2 Teofil Lenartowicz Street)
Tenement house

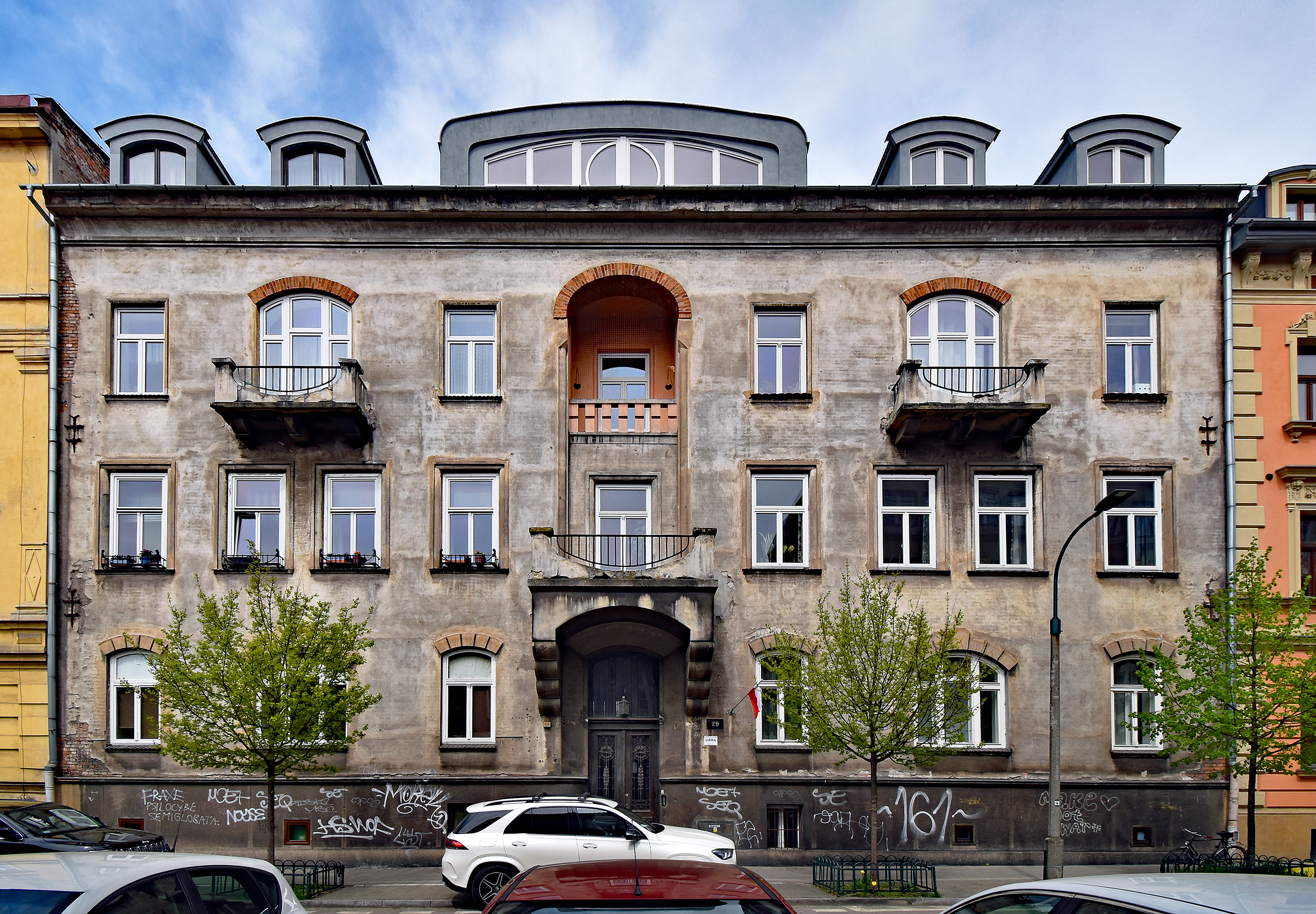
29 Henryk Siemiradzki Street
Tenement house, secession

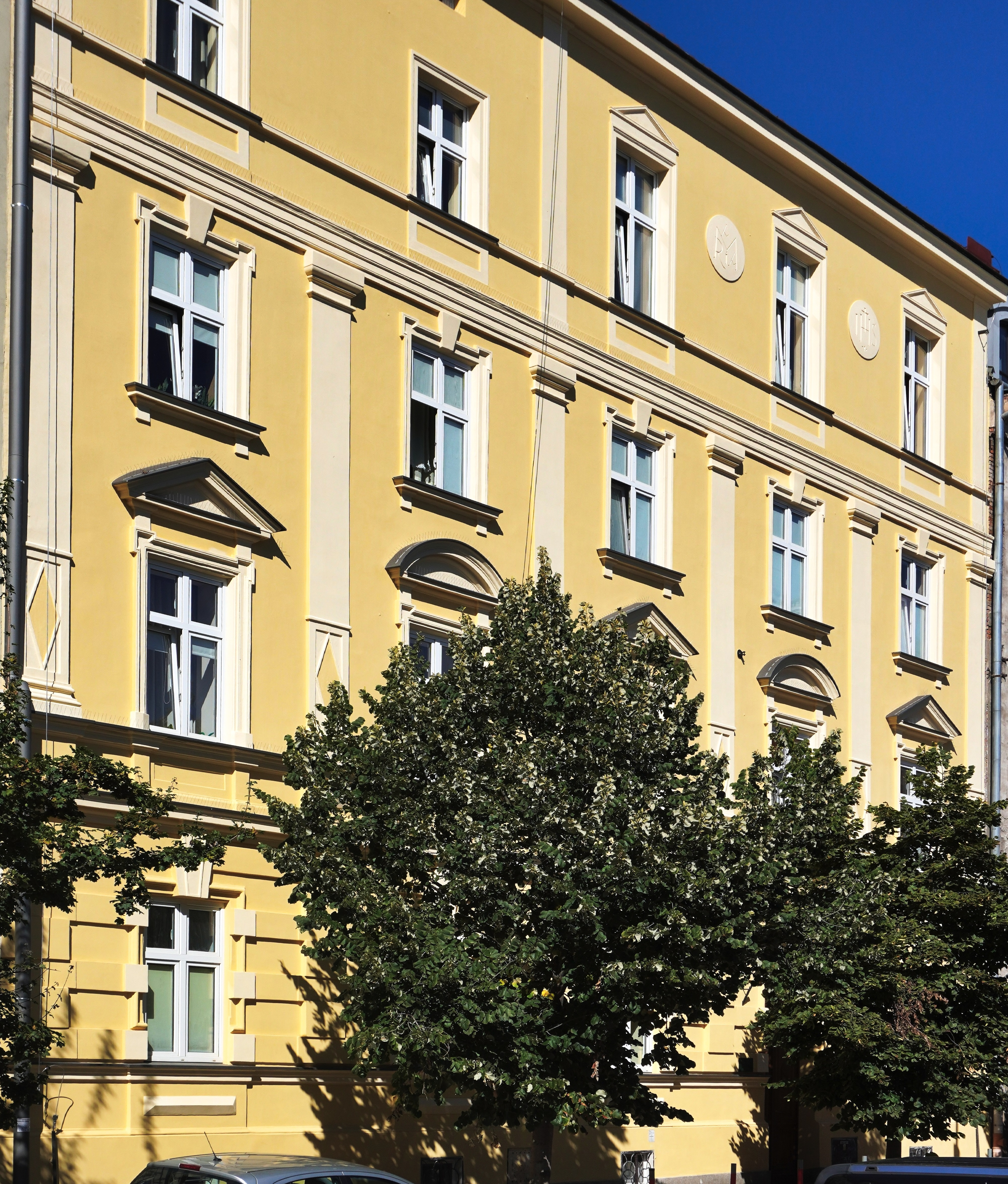
31 Henryk Siemiradzki Street
Tenement house (design. Bronisław Müller, 1890)

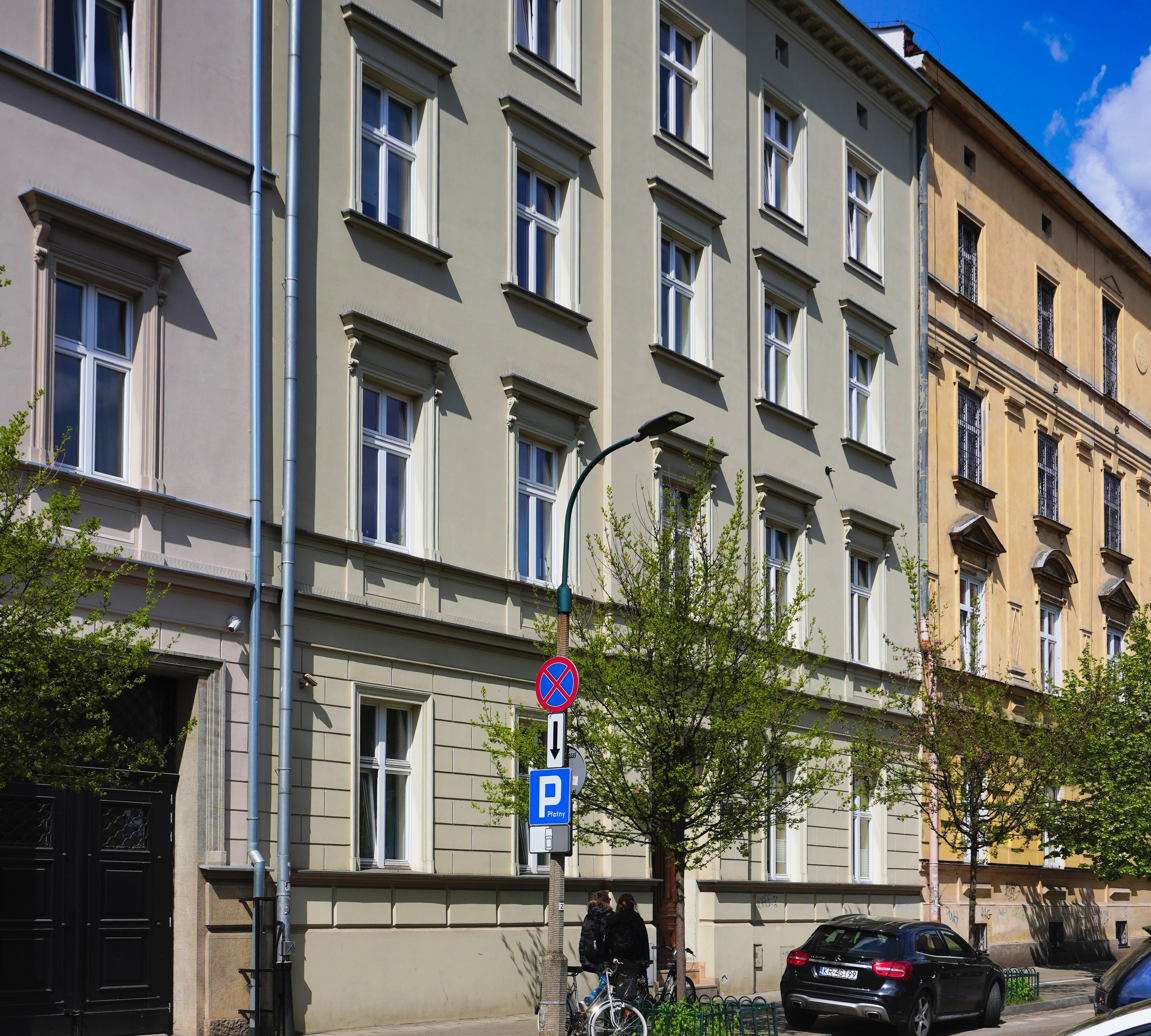
33 Henryk Siemiradzki Street
Tenement house

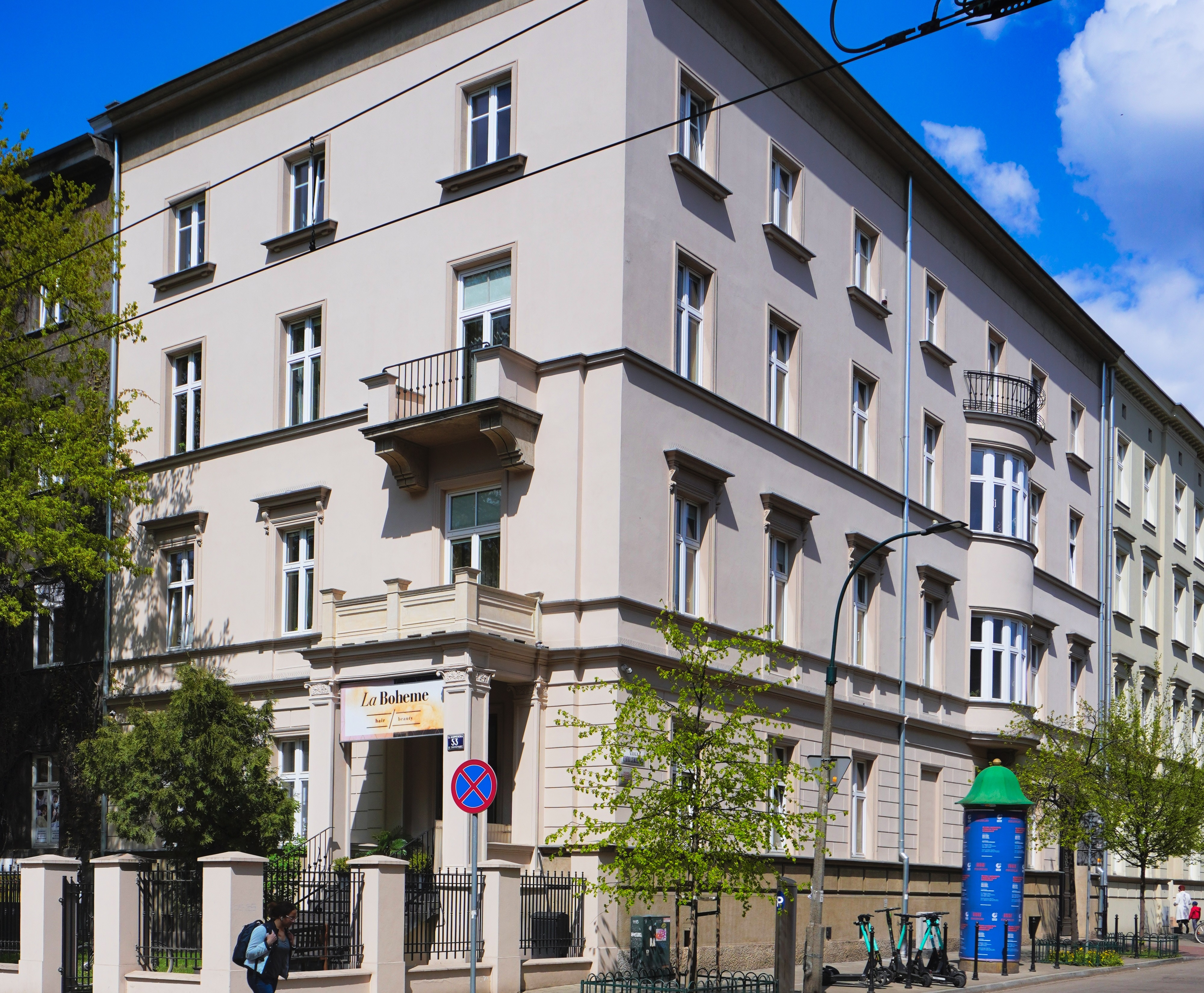
35 Henryk Siemiradzki Street (53 Karmelicka Street)
Tenement house (design. Bronisław Müller, 1881)
