= Jan Sobieski Street =

Street in Kraków, Poland

Jan Sobieski street
Kraków
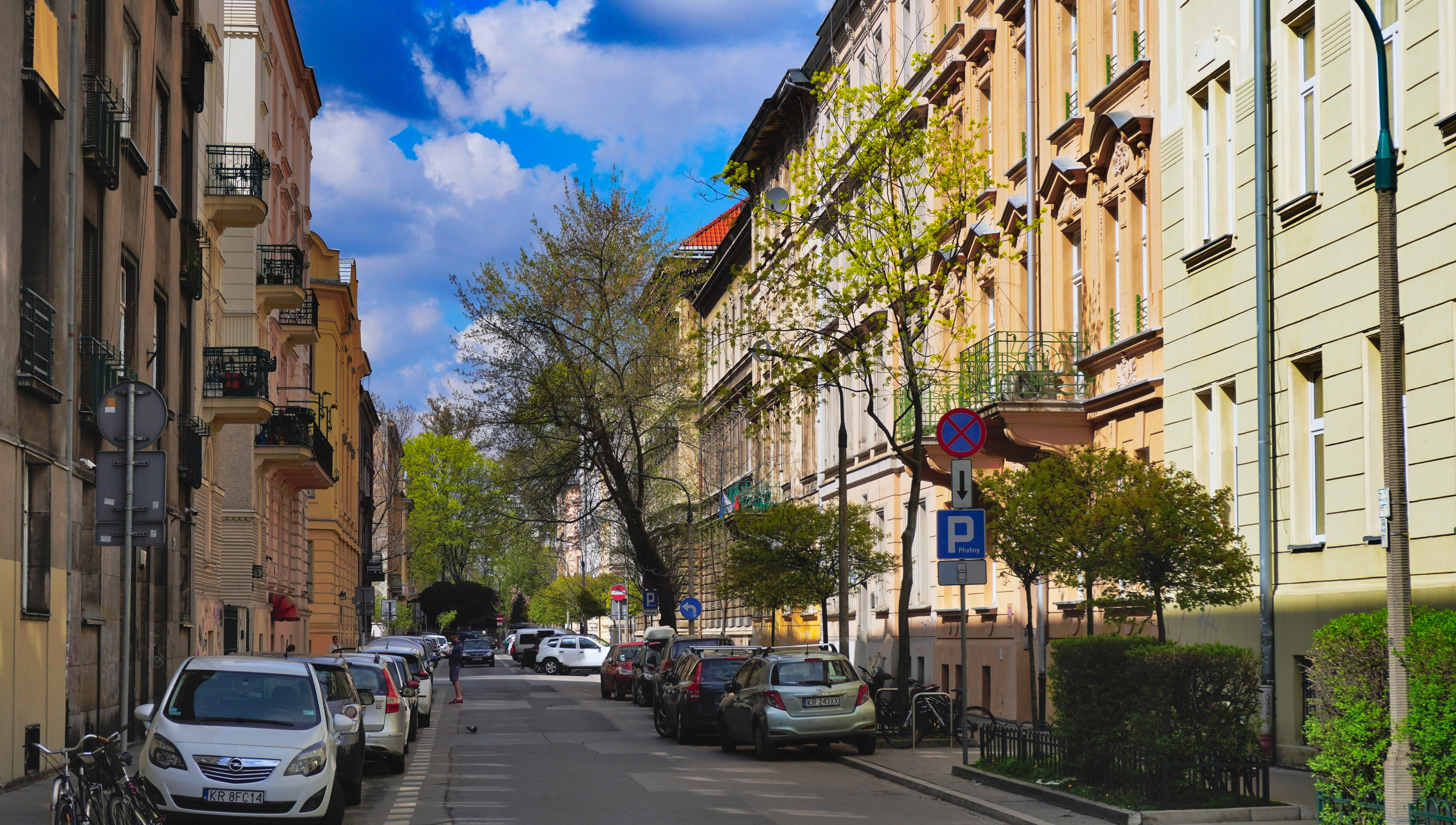
- View from the south, from Stefan Batory Street
- Interactive map of Jan Sobieski street
- Part of: Kraków Old Town district
- Owner: City of Kraków
- Location: Kraków, Poland

Jan Sobieski Street is a street in Kraków, in District I Old Town, in Piasek. It connects Stefan Batory Street to the south with Henryk Siemiradzki Street to the north.

== History ==
The street was laid out in 1887 and received its name in 1890.

== Buildings ==
The buildings along the street mostly date back to the 1890s and the early 20th century. They are primarily tenement houses without commercial functions, except for the buildings at the intersections with Kremerowska and Henryk Siemiradzki Streets.

- 1 Jan Sobieski Street – A secession-style tenement house. Designed by Józef Pokutyński, 1906–1907.
- 2 Jan Sobieski Street (9 Stefan Batory Street) – A modernist-style tenement house. Designed by Janusz Zarzycki, 1934.
- 3 Jan Sobieski Street – A tenement house with secession-style facade decoration. Designed by Jan Orłoński (?), 1905.
- 6 Jan Sobieski Street – A tenement house with a recessed pentagonal facade and a small garden in the center. Built between 1909–1910.
- 8 Jan Sobieski Street (2 Kremerowska Street) – A tenement house. Designed by Henryk Lamensdorf, 1913.
- 9–13 Jan Sobieski Street – The building of the II High School named after King Jan III Sobieski. Designed by Józef Sare, 1893–1897.
- 10–12 Jan Sobieski Street (1 Kremerowska Street) – A corner complex of two tenement houses with modernist architectural features. Designed by Wacław Krzyżanowski and Józef Pakies, 1907.
- 17 Jan Sobieski Street – A neo-Renaissance-style tenement house. Designed by Leopold Tlachna, 1890–1891.
- 19 Jan Sobieski Street – A tenement house. Designed by Aleksander Biborski, 1897.
- 24 Jan Sobieski Street (18 Henryk Siemiradzki Street) – A modernist-style tenement house. Designed by Stanisław Mehl, 1934–1935.

Along a side street branching off from Jan Sobieski Street, a complex of five residential buildings was constructed between 1911–1912 according to the design of Ignacy Wentzel (originally, the project planned for seven buildings arranged in a rectangular layout along the side street). The complex includes four tenement houses with facades in the picturesque historicism, neo-Gothic, or neo-Renaissance styles. The tenement house at 14 Jan Sobieski Street housed the headquarters of the printing house for the magazine "Sztuka" in the early 20th century. The inscription "Drukarnia Sztuka Administracja Wydawnictwa" (Sztuka Printing House Administration) has been preserved on the facade facing Jan Sobieski Street. The tenement houses at 16a Jan Sobieski and 16b feature facade decorations inspired by Lesser Poland Gothic, while the tenement house at 16c has a facade with neo-Gothic and neo-Renaissance elements. The building at 18 Jan Sobieski Street is a freestanding villa with a garden, also part of the complex, constructed earlier between 1908–1909.

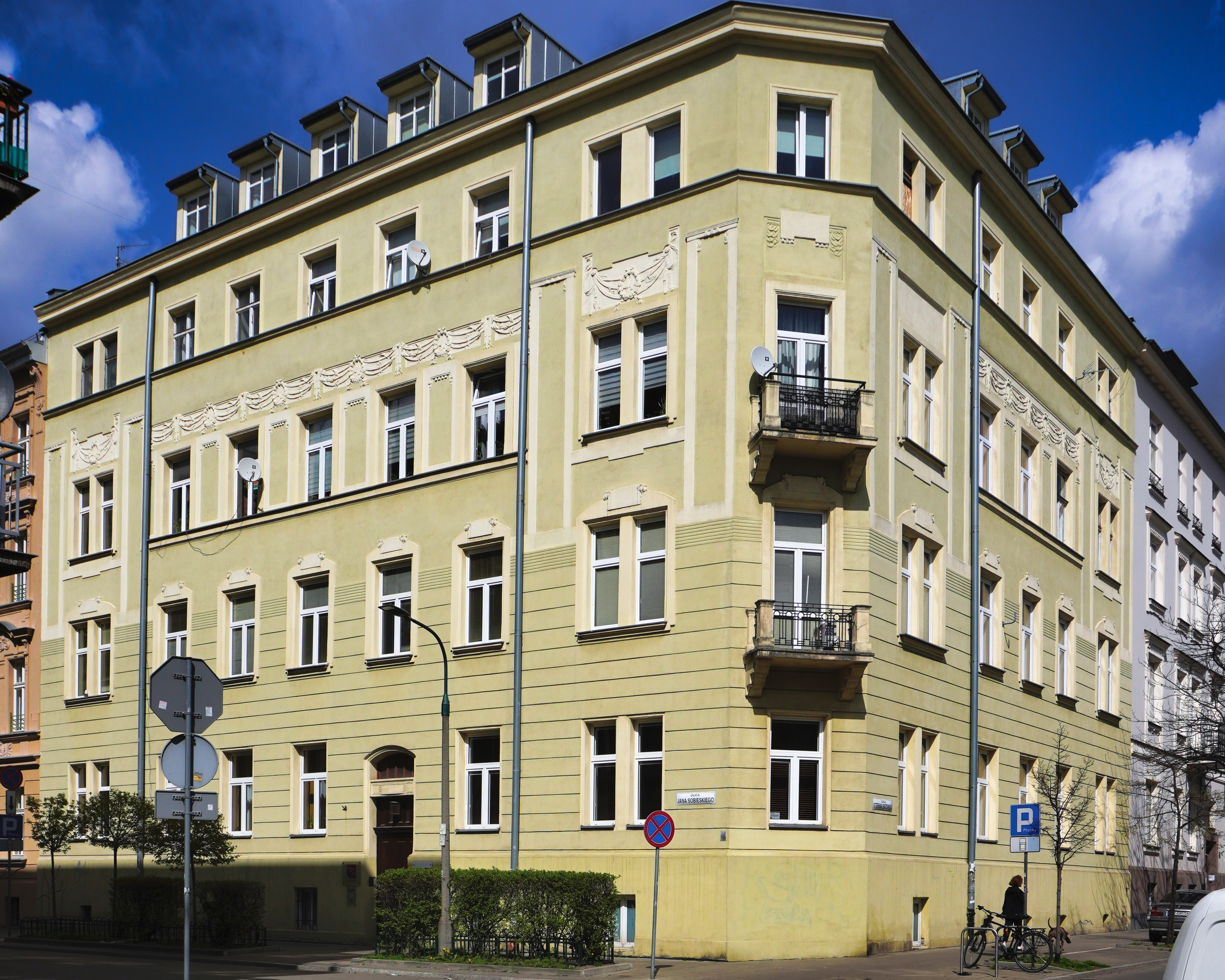
1 Jan Sobieski Street
Tenement house (design. Józef Pokutyński, 1906–1907)

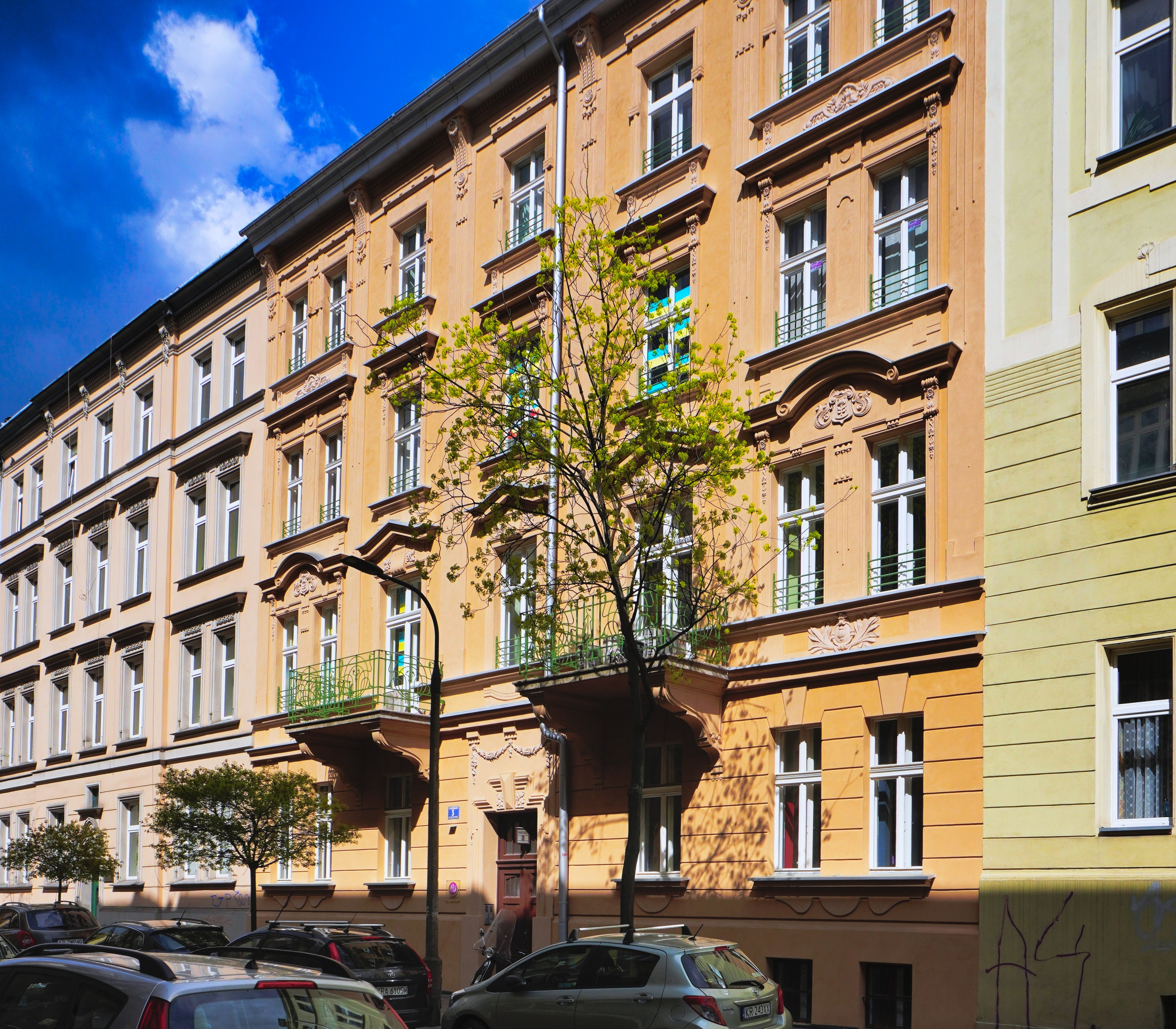
3 Jan Sobieski Street
Tenement house (design. Jan Orłoński (?), 1905)

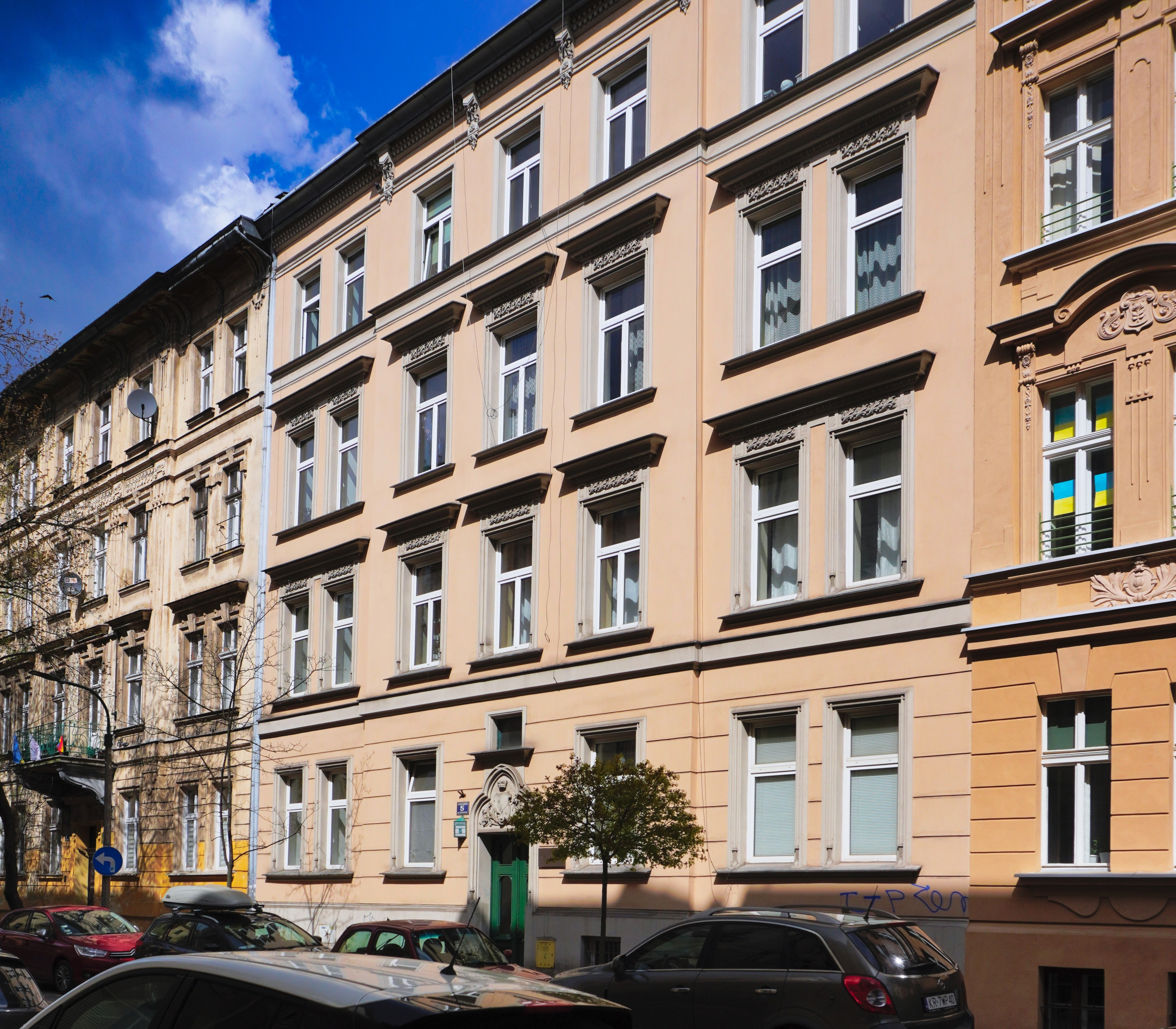
5 Jan Sobieski Street
Tenement house

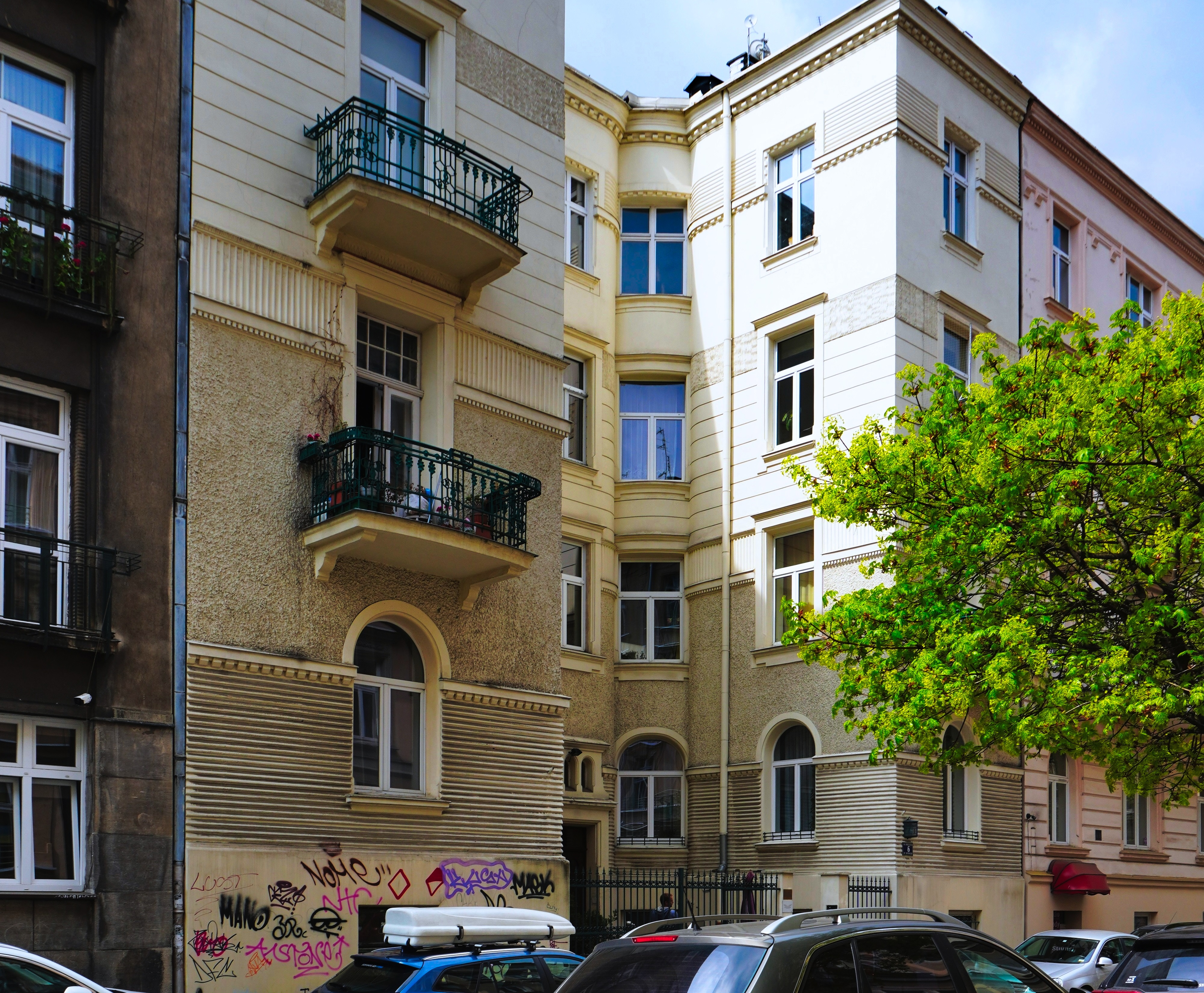
6 Jan Sobieski Street
Tenement house (1909–1910)

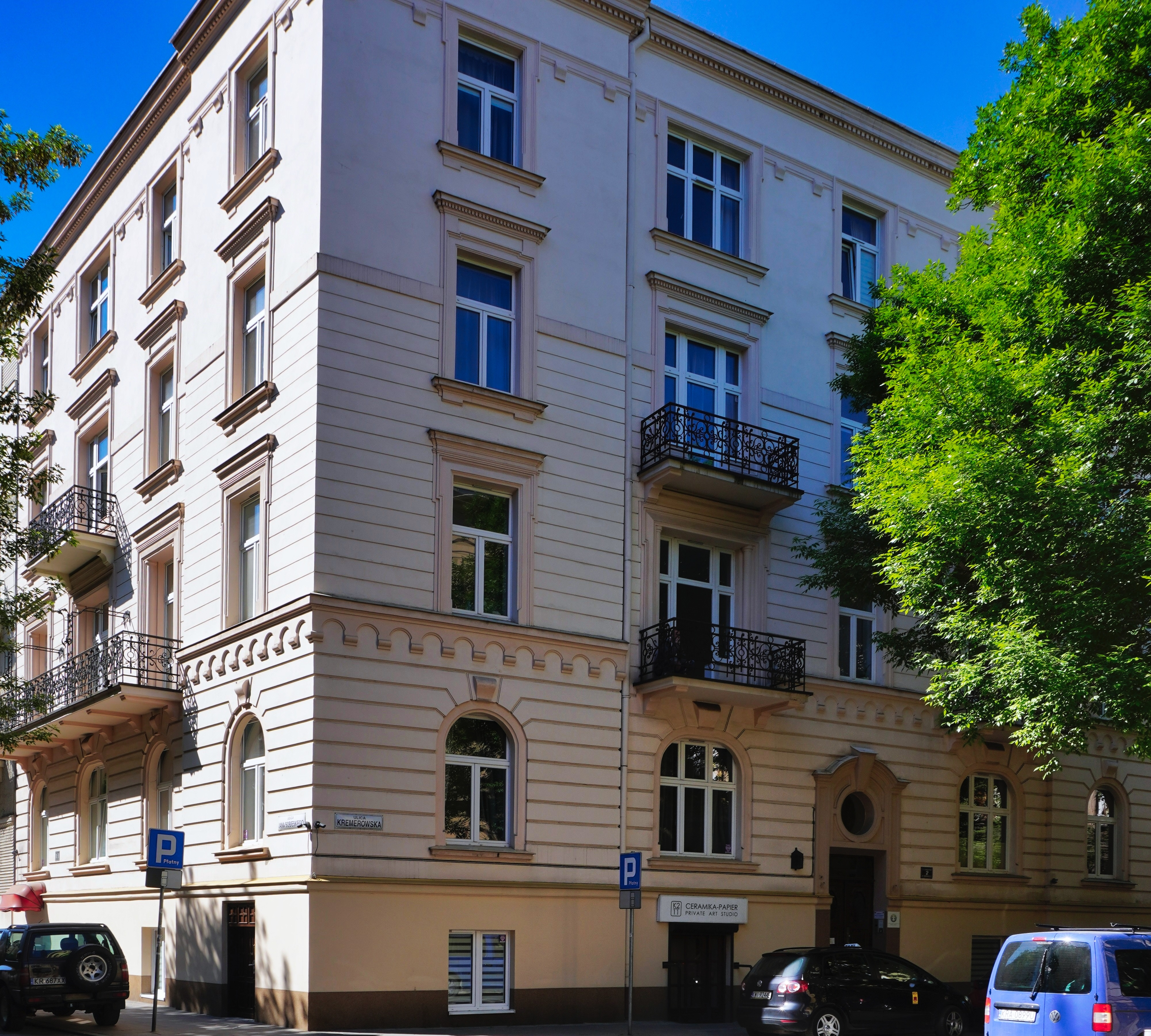
8 Jan Sobieski Street (2 Kremerowska Street)
Tenement house (design. Henryk Lamensdorf, 1913)

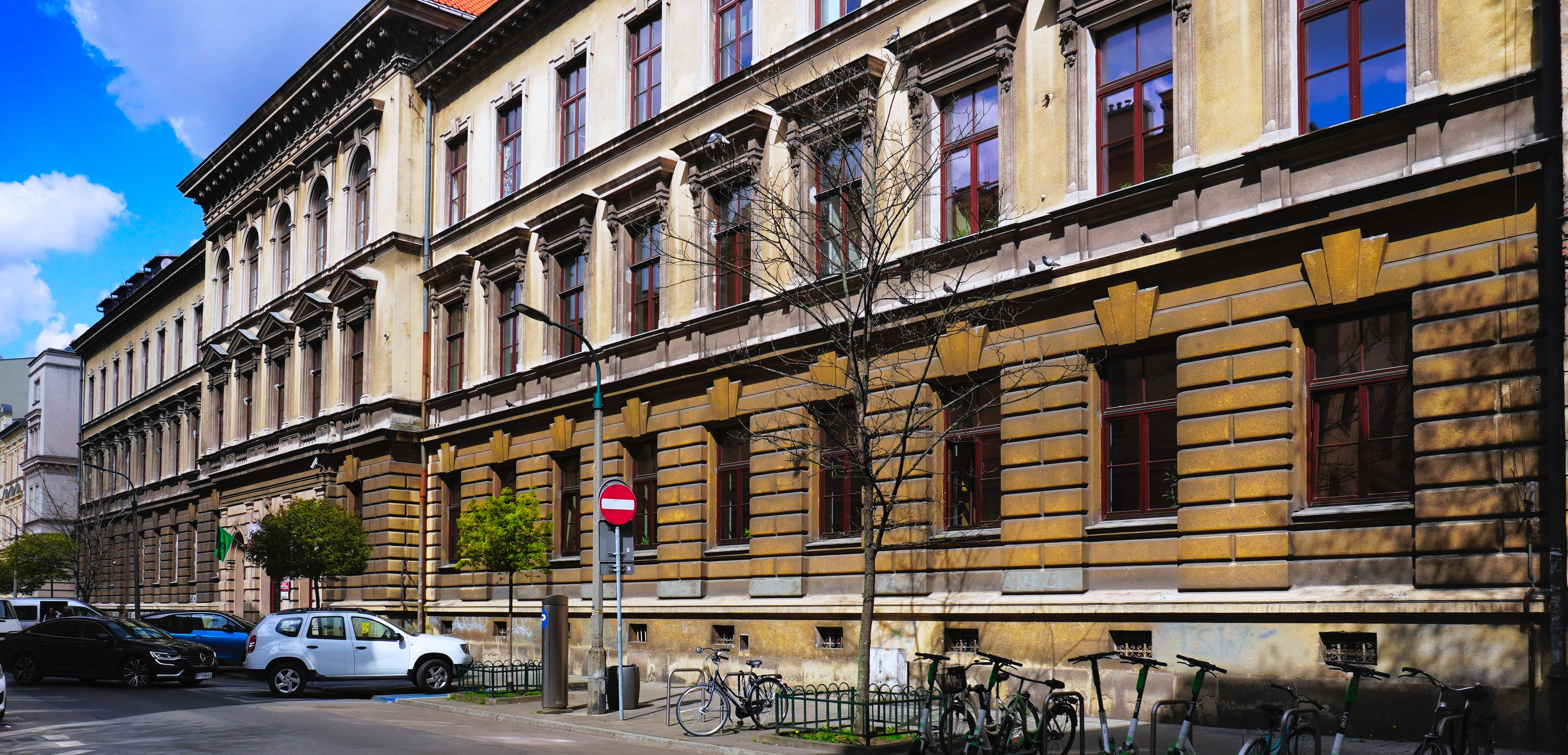
9–13 Jan Sobieski Street
The building of the King John III Sobieski 2nd High School (design. Józef Sare, 1893–1897).

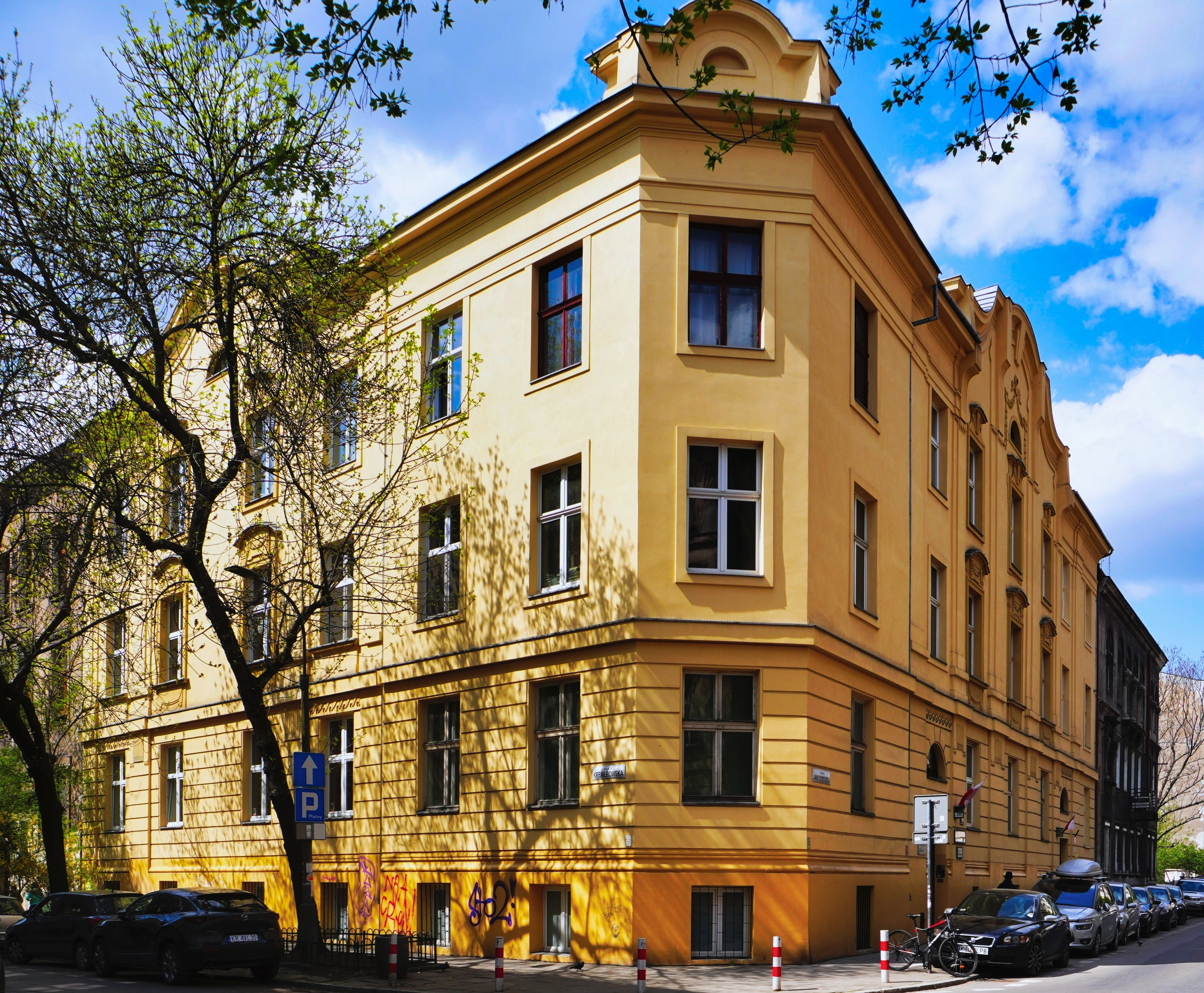
10–12 Jan Sobieski Street
Tenement houses (design. Wacław Krzyżanowski and Józef Pakies, 1907)

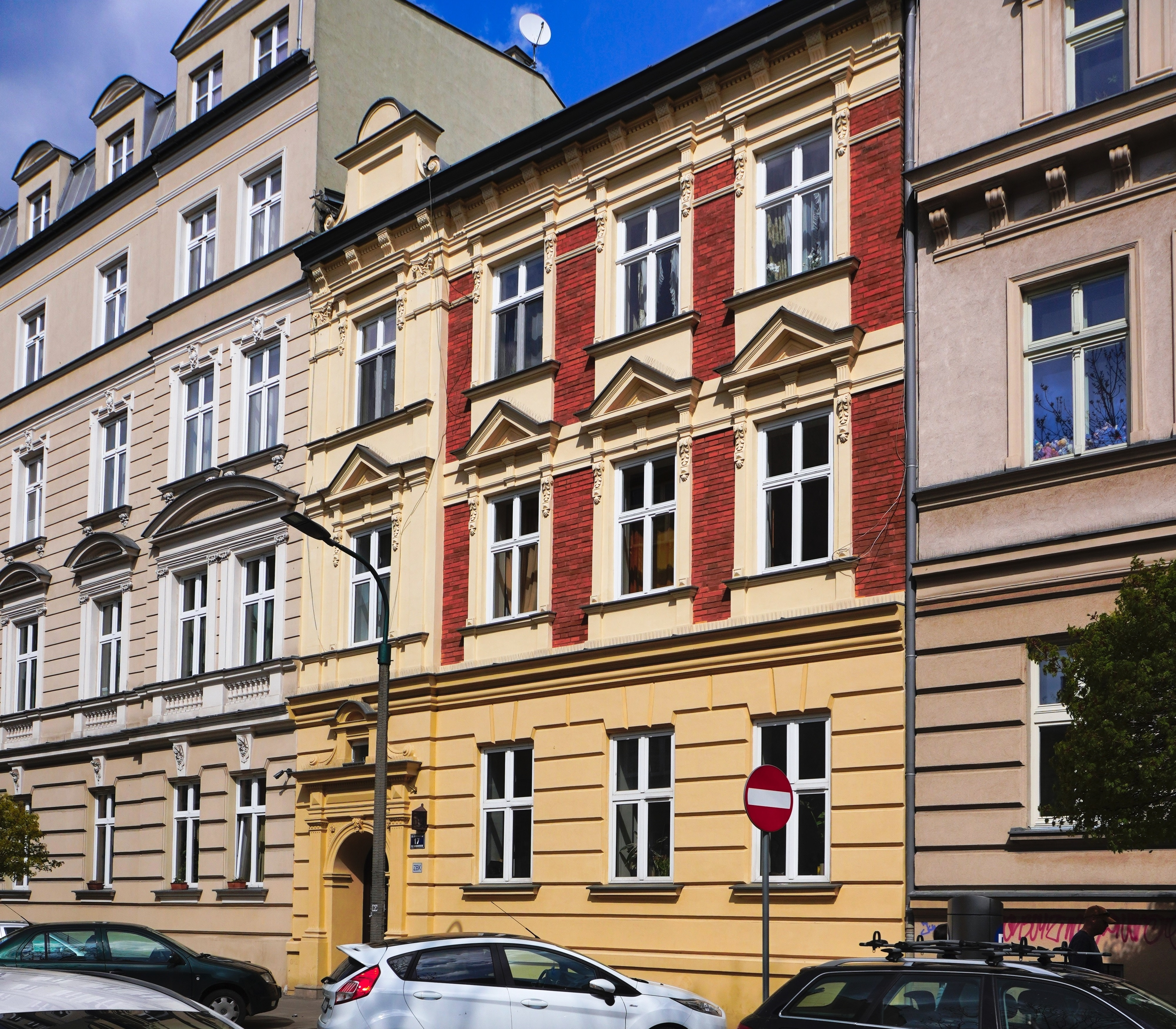
17 Jan Sobieski Street
Tenement house (design. Leopold Tlachna, 1890–1891)

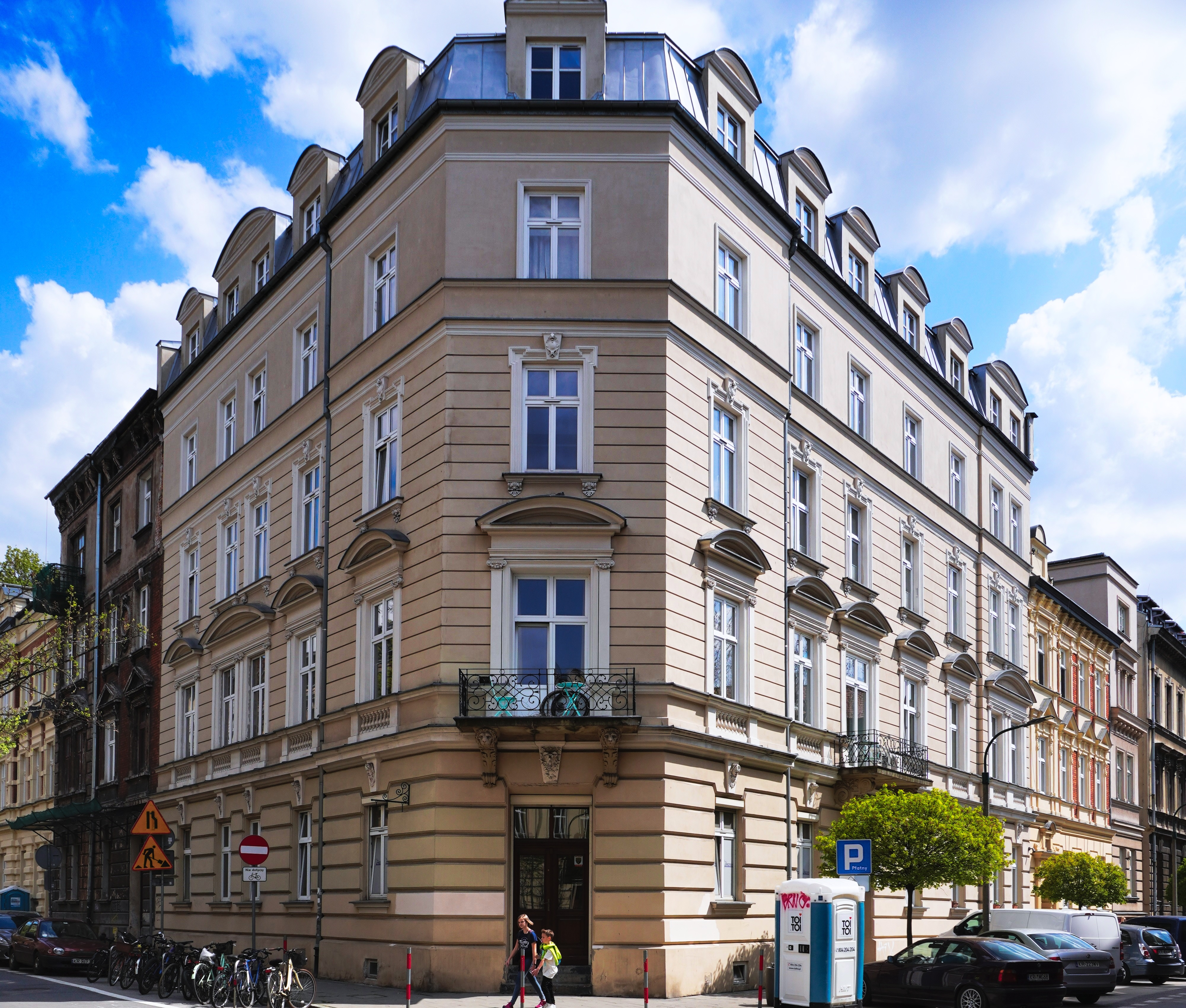
19 Jan Sobieski Street
Tenement house (design. Aleksander Biborski, 1897)
