= Dębniki, Kraków =

Dębniki
- Dzielnica of Kraków
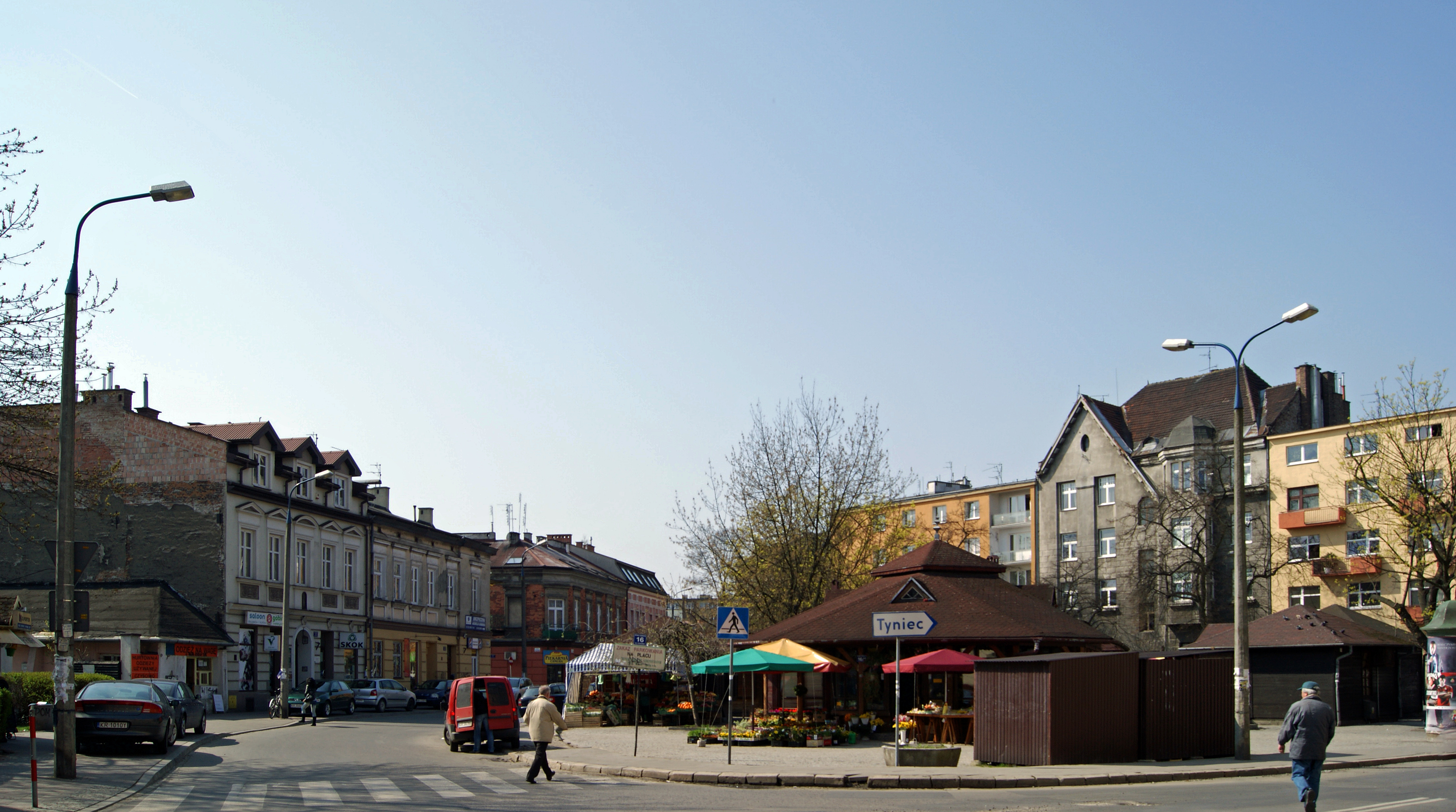
- Debnicki Market Square

- Location of Dębniki within Kraków
- Coordinates: 50°2′0″N 19°53′0″E
- Country: Poland
- Voivodeship: Lesser Poland
- County/City: Kraków

Government
  - President: Arkadiusz Puszkarz

Area
  - Total: 46.19 km^{2} (17.83 sq mi)

Population (2014)
  - Total: 59,395
  - Density: 1,286/km^{2} (3,330/sq mi)
- Time zone: UTC+1 (CET)
  - Summer (DST): UTC+2 (CEST)
- Area code: +48 12
- Website: http://www.dzielnica8.krakow.pl

Dębniki is one of 18 districts of Kraków, located in the southwest part of the city. The name Dębniki comes from a village of same name that is now a part of the district.

According to the Central Statistical Office data, the district's area is 46.19 square kilometres (17.83 square miles) and 59 395 people inhabit Dębniki.

== History ==
The former village of Dębniki developed thanks to the construction of a bridge over the Vistula River in 1888. At the turn of the 19th and 20th centuries, numerous factories and enterprises were established here, and the main square Rynek Dębnicki was formed where the most important streets of the village converged. In 1910 Dębniki was incorporated into Krakow. Between 1935 and 1938, a Workers' Housing Estate was built along what is now Praska Street. During the German occupation during World War II, there were plans to demolish the buildings of Dębniki and build an ideal Nazi city in its place, but these plans were not realised. Further development of the district was brought about by the construction of the Grunwald Bridge and the Podwale Housing Estate after the Second World War.

== Subdivisions of Dębniki ==
Dębniki is divided into smaller subdivisions (osiedles). Here's a list of them.

- Ruczaj
- Osiedle Europejskie
- Osiedle Interbud
- Osiedle Zielona Galicja
- Osiedle Kolejowe
- Osiedle Panorama
- Kliny Zacisze
- Mochnaniec
- Skotniki
- Tyniec
- Zakrzówek
- Kapelanka

== Architecture ==
- Benedictine Abbey of Tyniec - benedictine abbey founded in 1044 in the village of Tyniec (part of Kraków and Dębniki district since 1973)
- Lasocki Palace - ca. 1850, enlarged ca. 1871
- Chapel of St Peter and St Paul - designed by Józef Pokutyński, built 1883 in Renaissance Revival style
- St Stanislaus Kostka Church - designed by Wacław Krzyżanowski, built 1932-1938
- Workers' Housing Estate - built 1935-1938
- Podwawelskie Housing Estate - designed by Witold Cęckiewicz and built 1967–1976
- Forum Hotel - designed by Janusz Ingarden and built 1978–1989 in brutalist style
- Seminary of the Salesian Society - designed by Dariusz Kozłowski and built 1985–1996 in Postmodern style
- Manggha Museum of Japanese Art and Technology - designed by Arata Isozaki and built 1993-1994 in Postmodern style
- Park Inn Hotel, designed by Jürgen Mayer, built 2007–2009
- ICE Krakow Congress Centre - designed by Krzysztof Ingarden and Jacek Ewý, built 2010-2014
- Zalew Zakrzówek - flooded quarry arranged as a park and swimming area in 2023

== Gallery ==
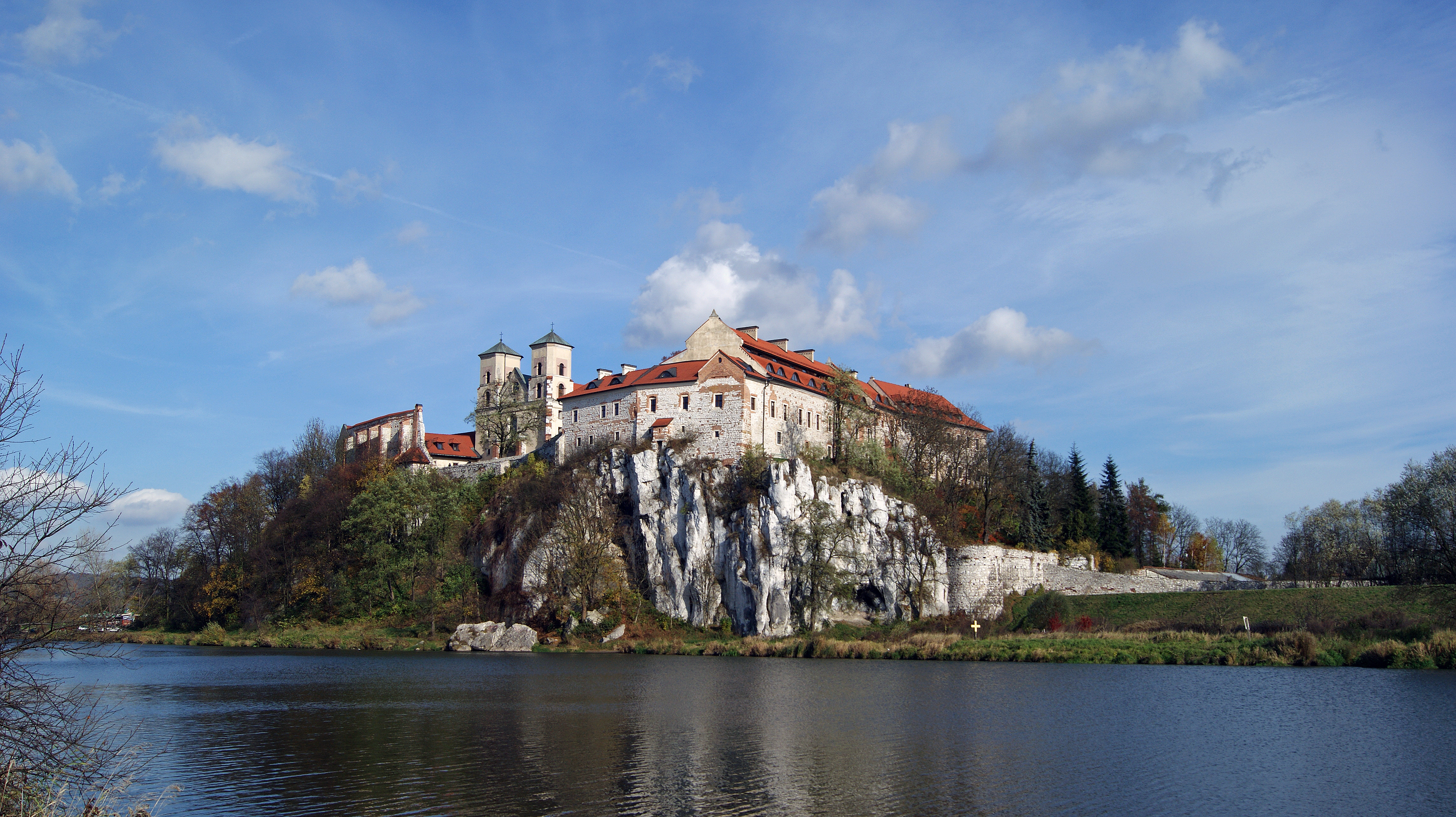
Benedictine Abbey of Tyniec

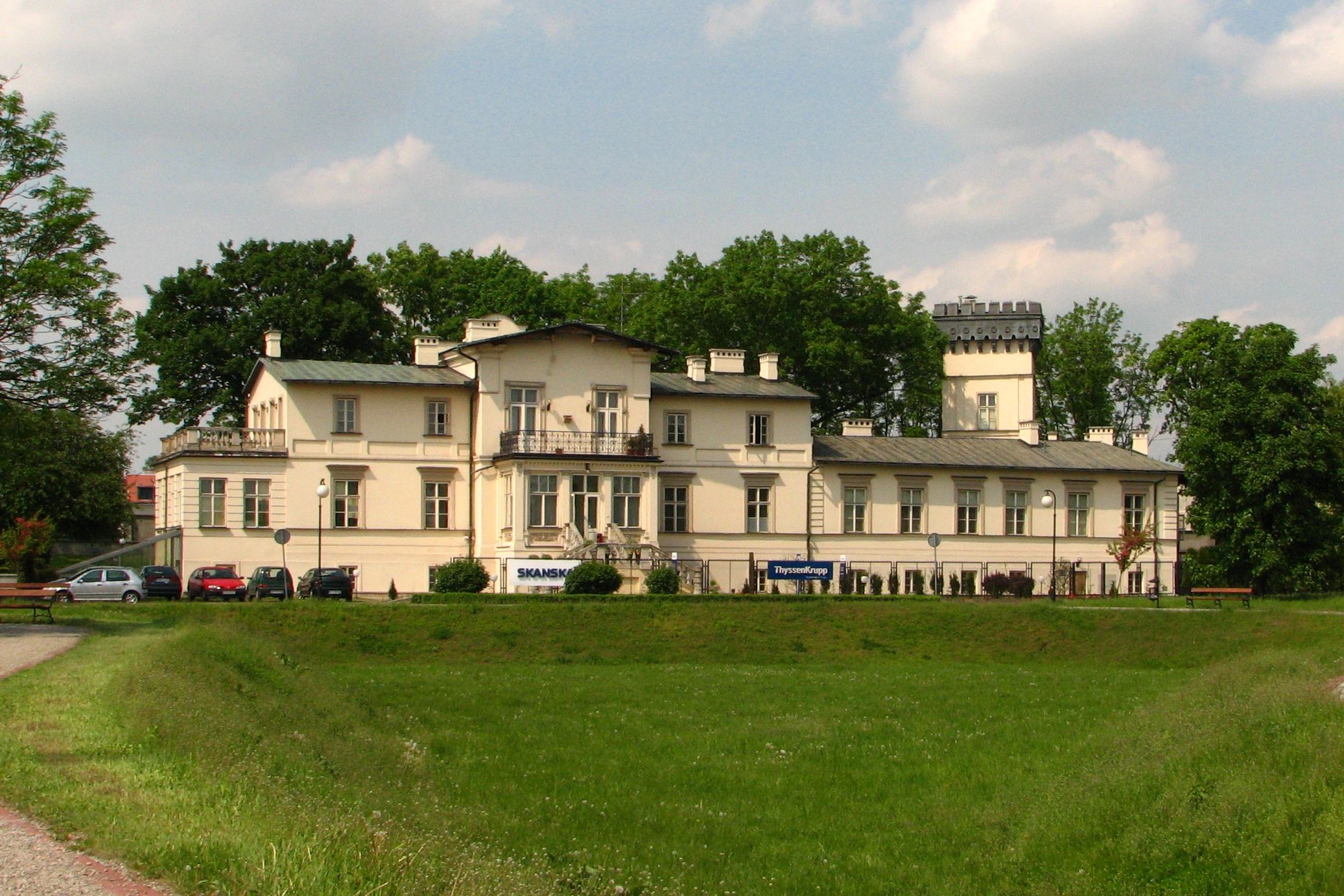
Lasocki Palace

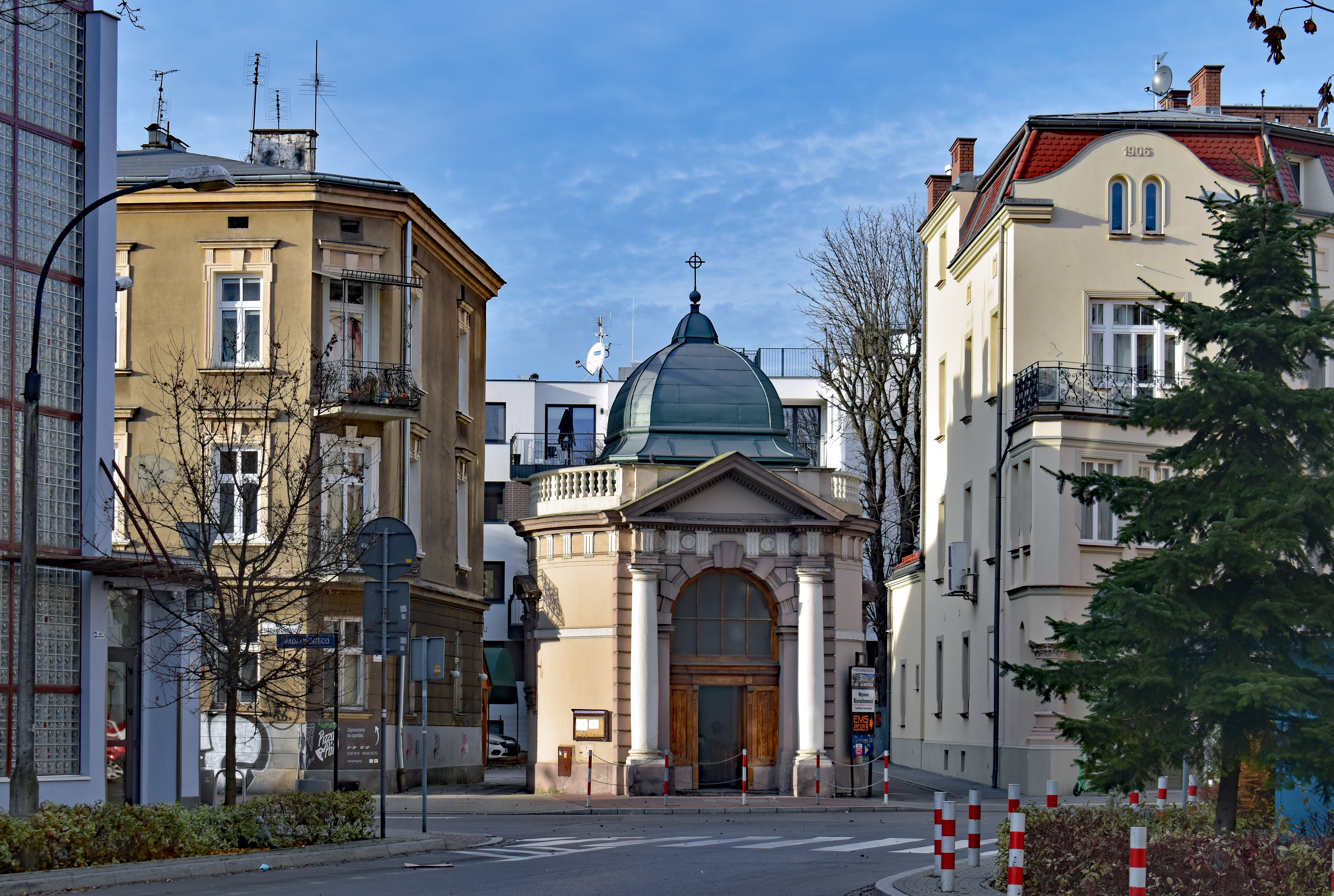
Chapel of St Peter and St Paul

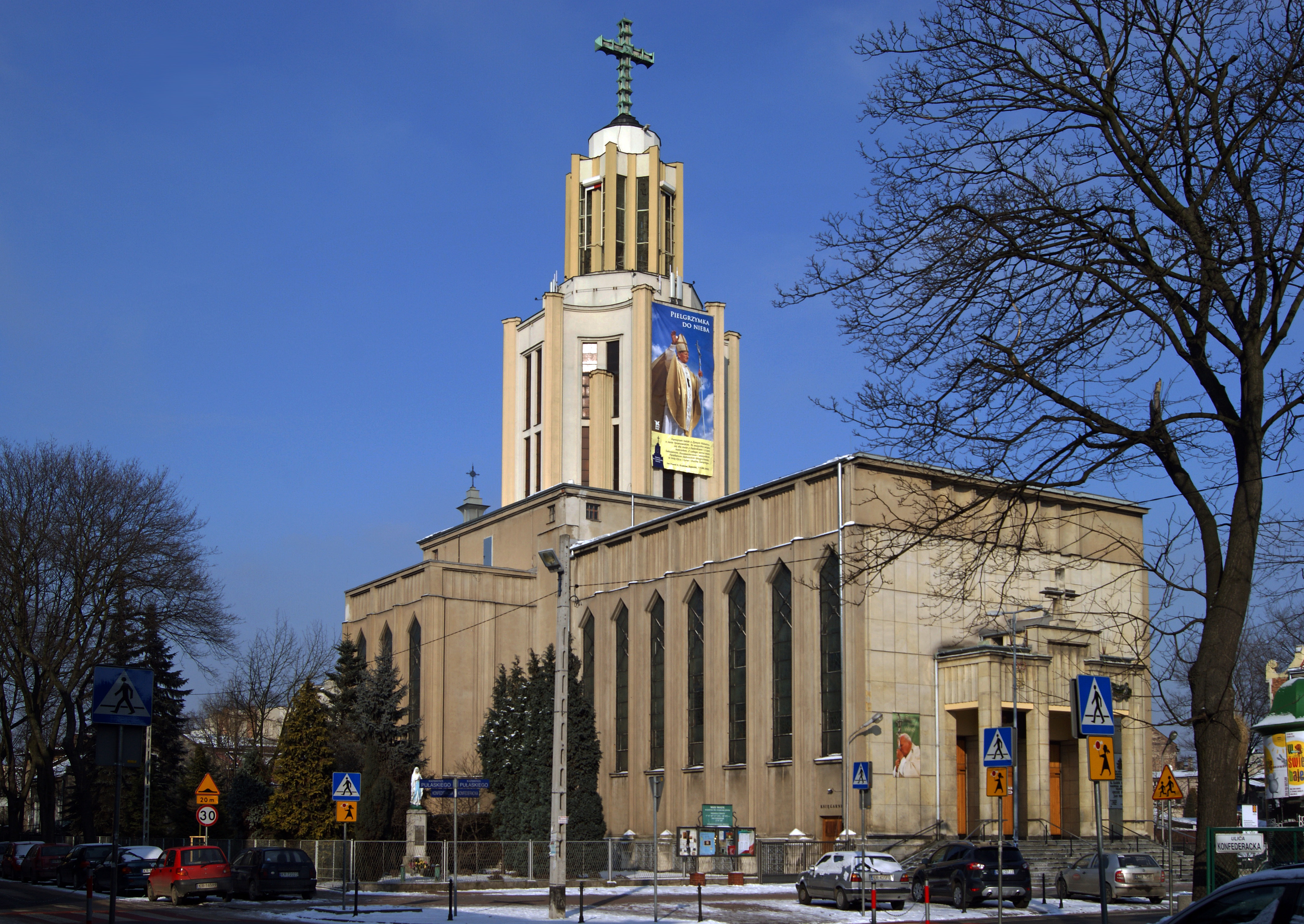
St Stanislaus Kostka Church

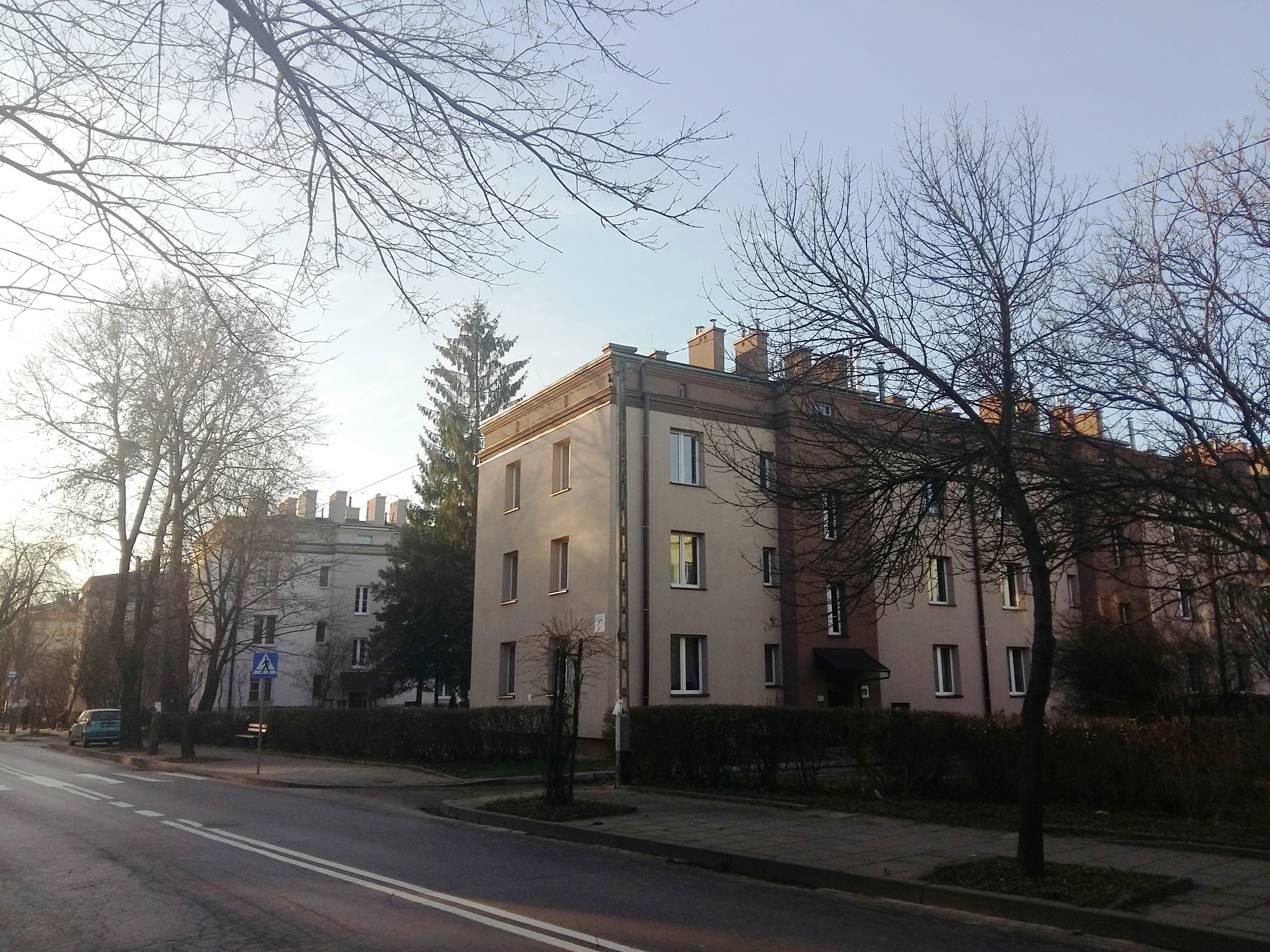
Workers' Housing Estate

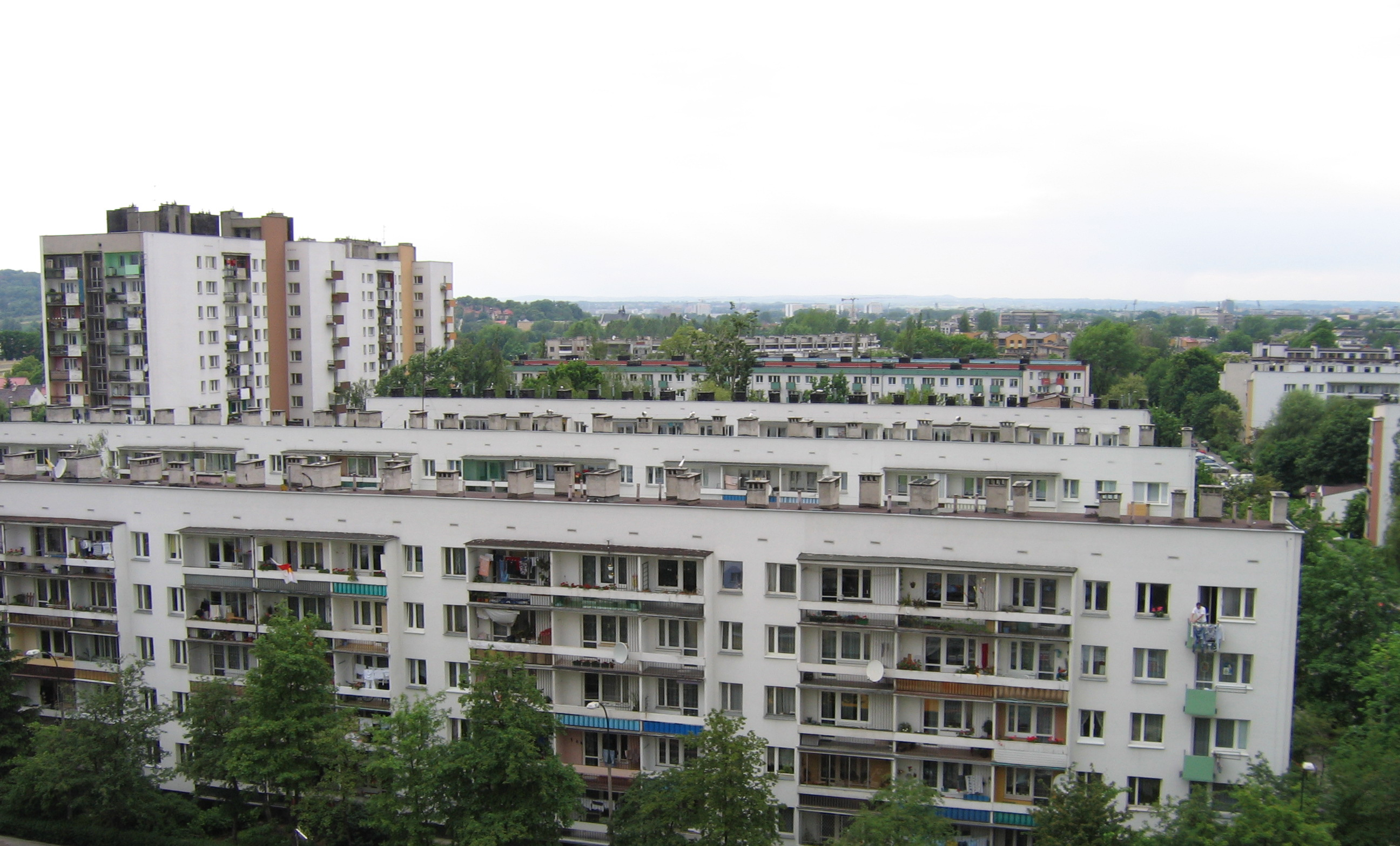
Podwawelskie Housing Estate

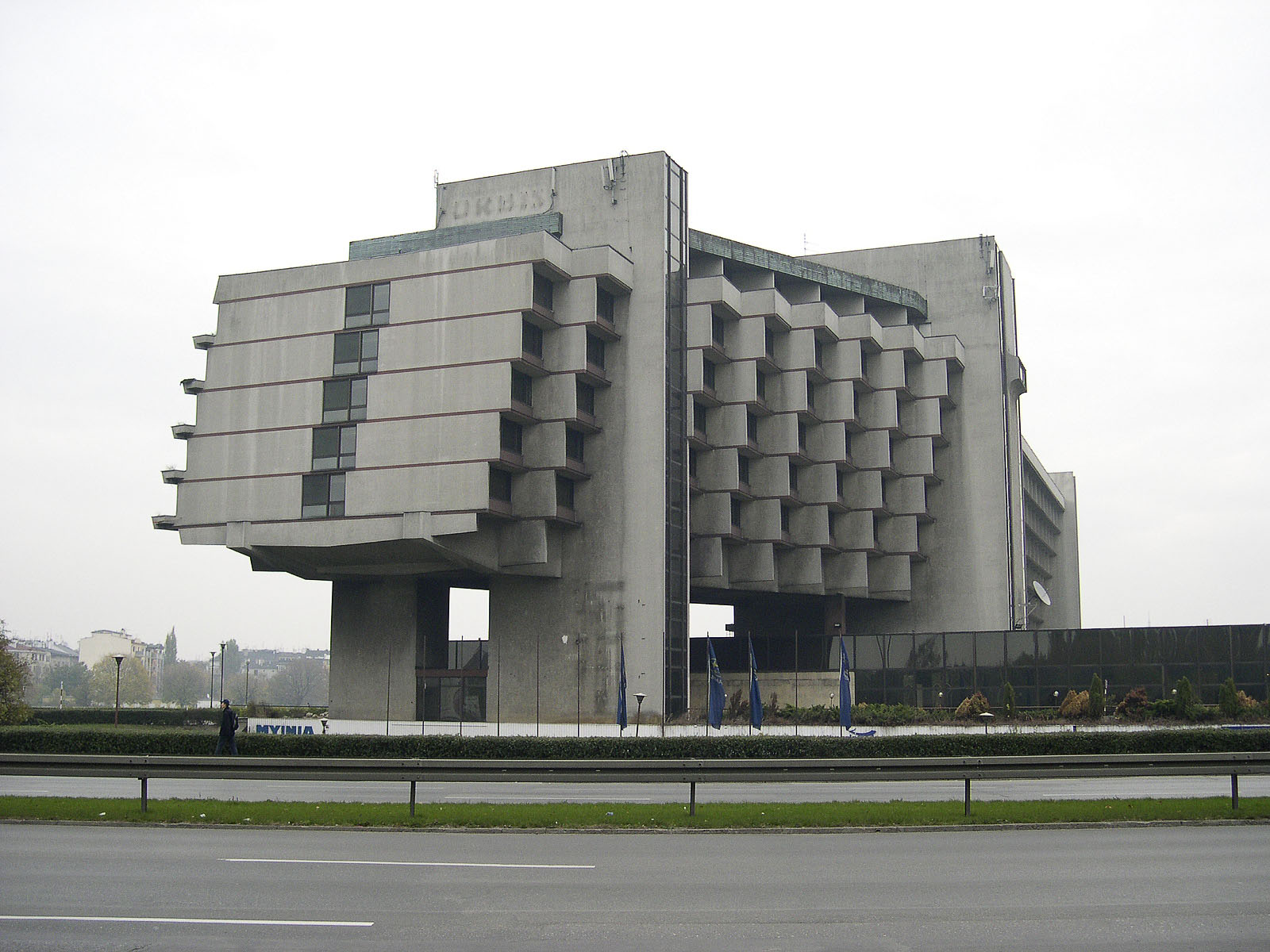
Forum Hotel

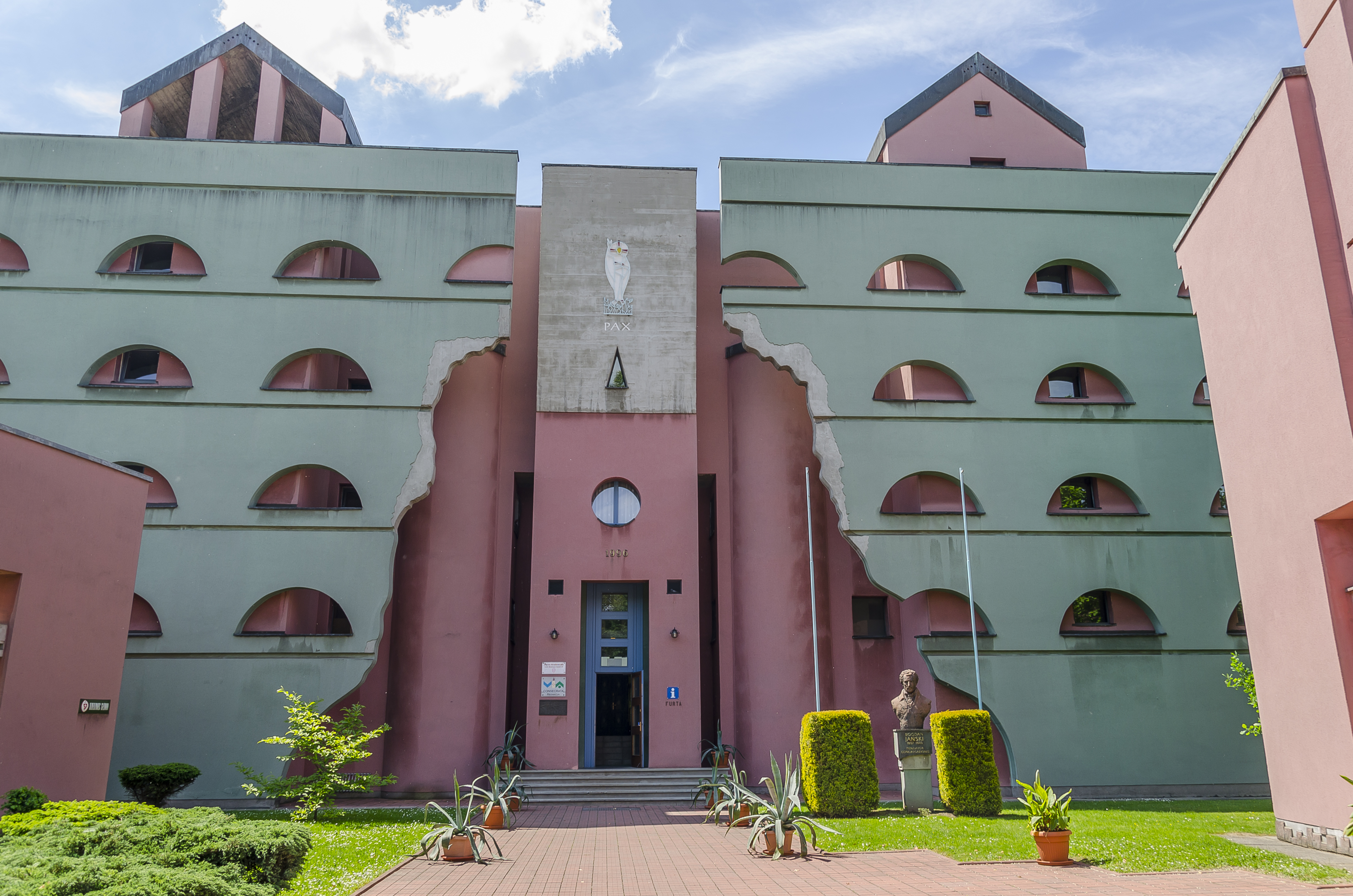
Seminary of the Salesian Society

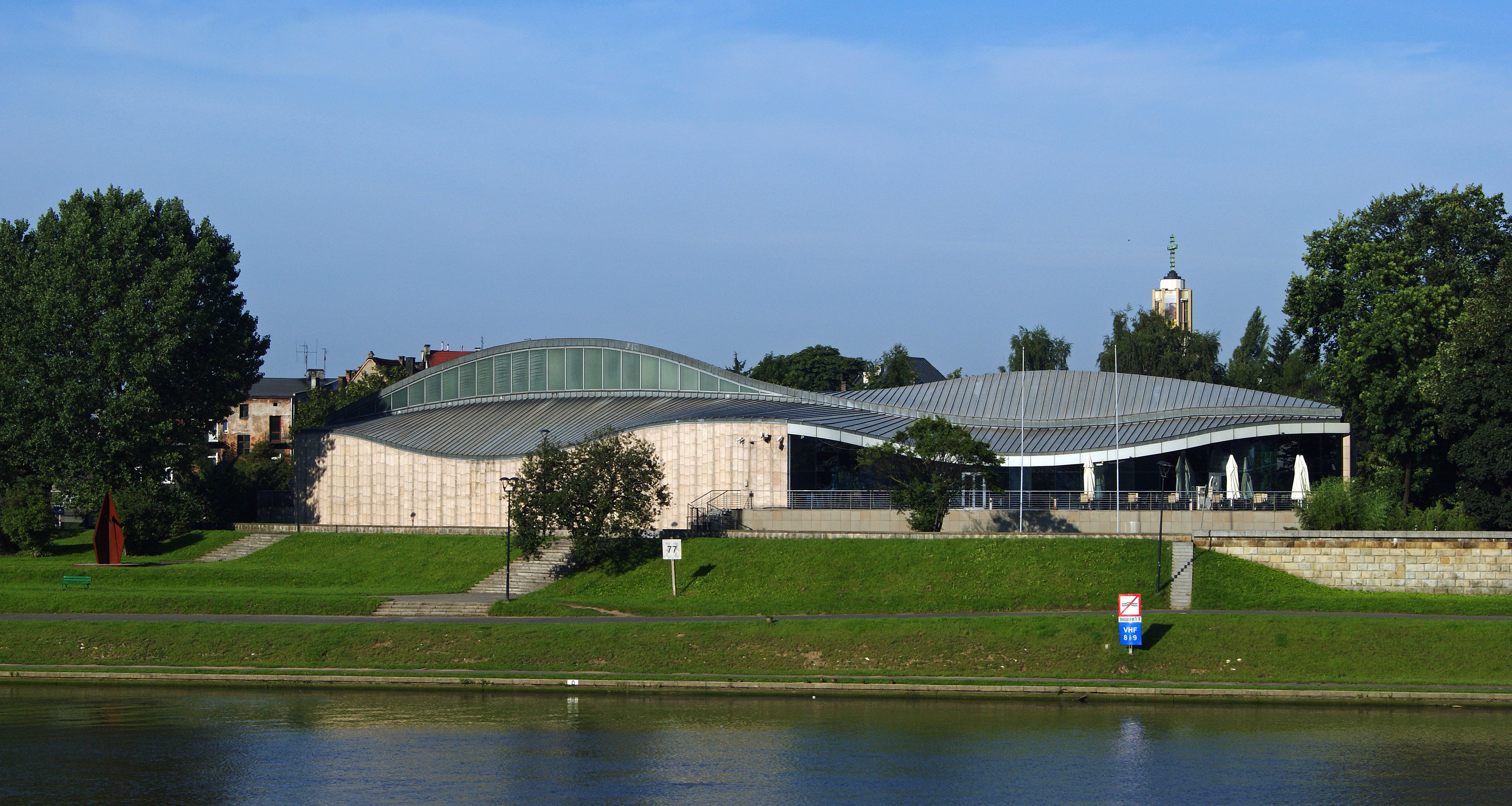
Manggha Museum of Japanese Art and Technology

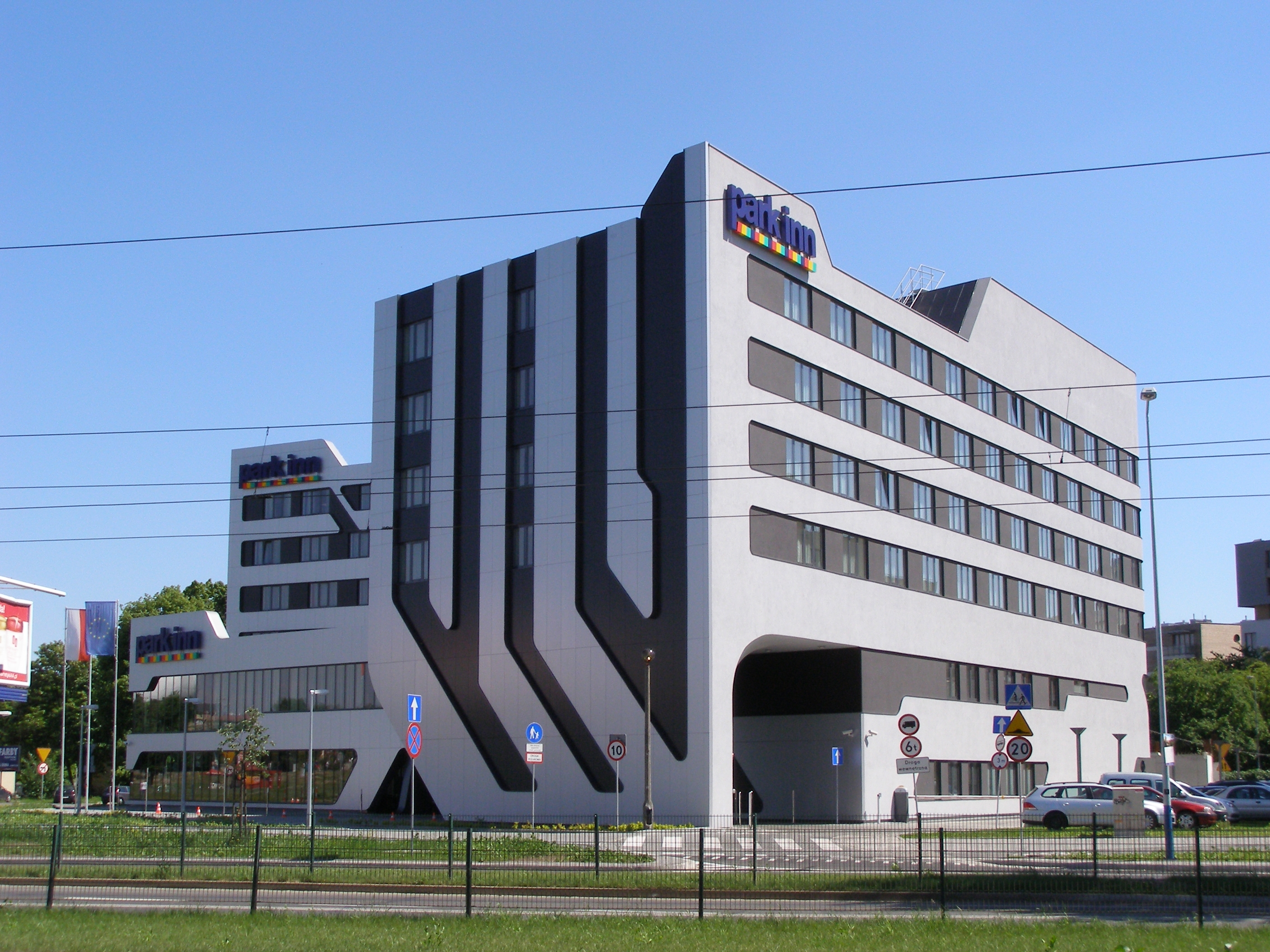
Park Inn Hotel

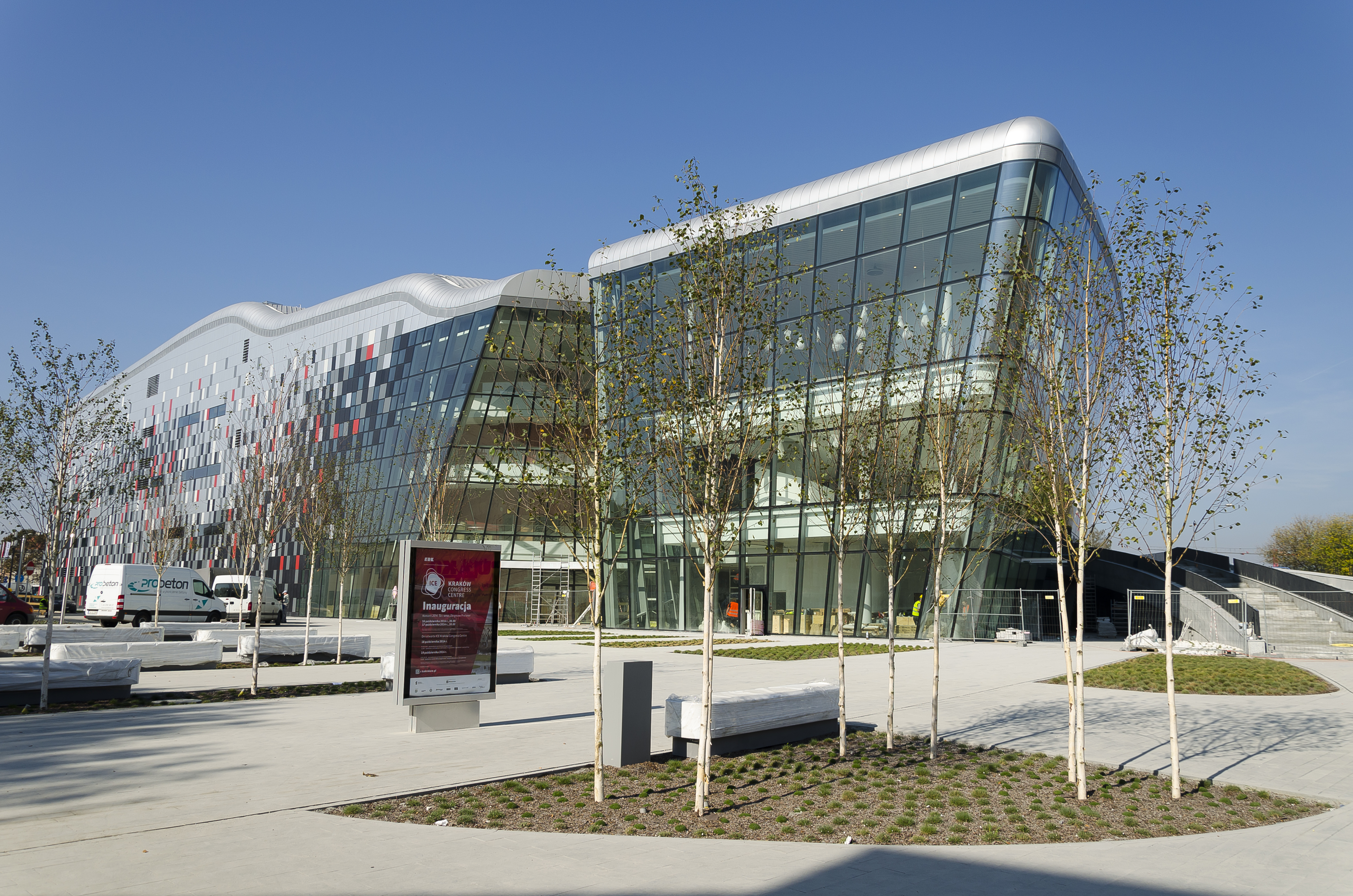
ICE Krakow Congress Centre

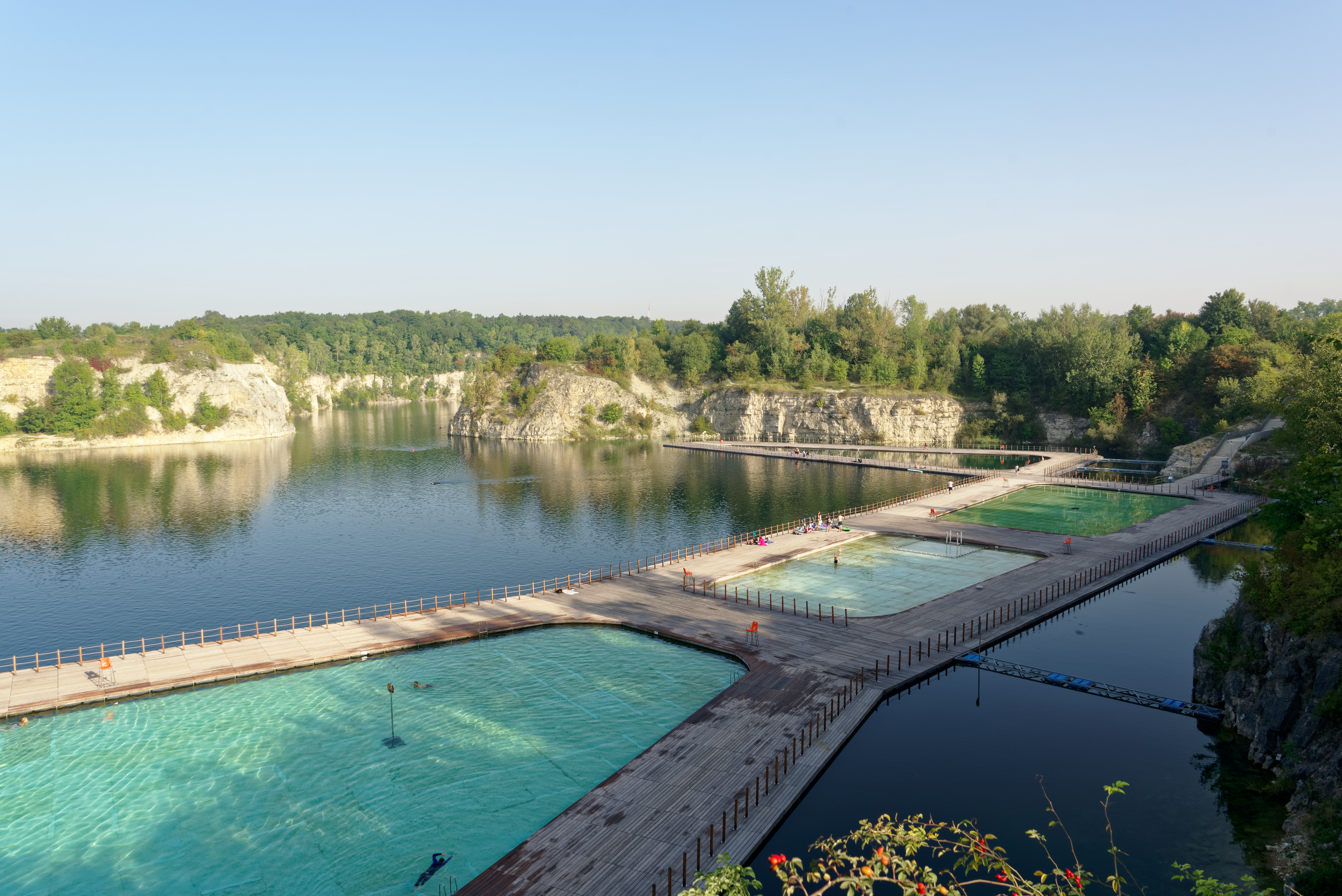
Zalew Zakrzówek
