= Kremerowska Street =

Street in Kraków, Poland

Kremerowska street
Kraków
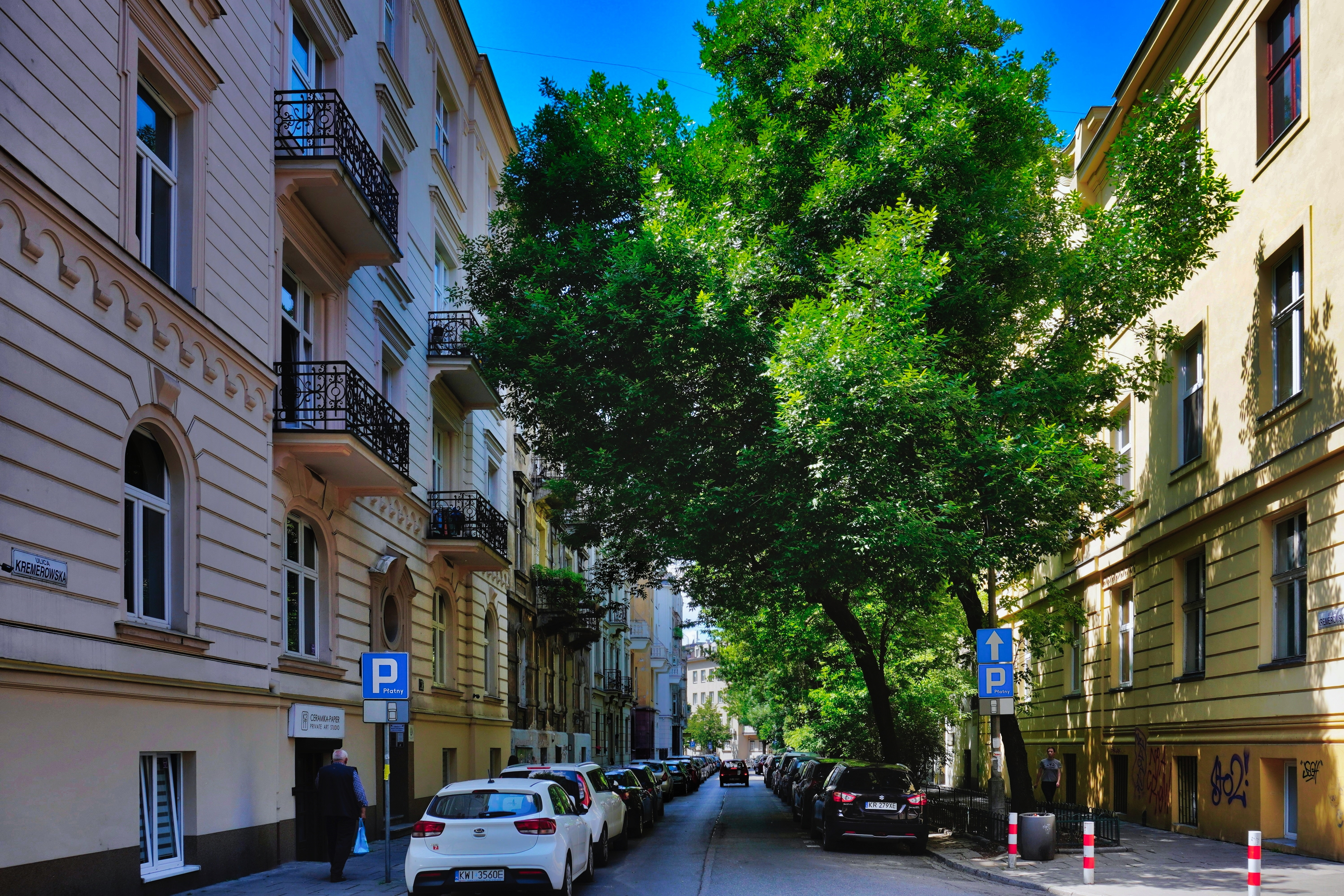
- View west, from Jan Sobieski Street
- Interactive map of Kremerowska street
- Part of: Kraków Old Town district
- Owner: City of Kraków
- Location: Kraków, Poland

Kremerowska Street in Kraków is a street in Kraków, in District I Old Town, in Piasek. It runs from Jan Sobieski Street in a westward and south-westward direction to Karmelicka Street.

== History ==
The street was laid out during a period of intense urban development at the beginning of the 20th century, as an extension of Ambroży Grabowski Street in an eastward direction. Its current name was assigned in 1909 and refers to the Kremer family, who owned extensive properties in this area, including suburban gardens.

== Buildings ==
The street's development is primarily residential, characterized mainly by tenement houses built at the beginning of the 20th century in the style of early modernism. A distinctive feature of the development on Kremerowska Street is four tenement houses with recessed central sections and gardens inside the formed block, before the entrance. This type of tenement was not a common form in Krakow's architecture at the beginning of the 20th century.

- 1 Kremerowska Street (10–12 Jan Sobieski Street) – A corner complex of two tenement houses with modernist architectural features. Designed by Wacław Krzyżanowski and Józef Pakies, 1907.
- 2 Kremerowska Street (8 Jan Sobieski Street) – Tenement house. Designed by Henryk Lamensdorf, 1913.
- 3 Kremerowska Street – Tenement house with modernist architectural features. Designed by Alfred Kramarski, 1909.
- 6 Kremerowska Street – Tenement house with modernist features. Designed by Aleksander Biborski, 1910. In this tenement lived Ignacy Daszyński, which is commemorated by a memorial plaque embedded in the building's facade.
- 8 Kremerowska Street – Tenement house with a facade with recessed central sections and a garden in the middle, before the entrance. Designed by 10 Ludwik Gutman, around 1910.
- 10 Kremerowska Street – Tenement house with a facade with recessed central sections and a garden in the middle, before the entrance. Designed by Ludwik Gutman, around 1910.
- 12 Kremerowska Street – Tenement house in the style of early modernism. Designed by Janusz Zarzecki, 1912.
- 14 Kremerowska Street – Tenement house with a facade with recessed central sections and a garden in the middle, before the entrance. Designed by Henryk Lamensdorf, 1910–1912.
- 15 Kremerowska Street (2 Wilhelm Feldman Street) – Tenement house in a modernist style with a richly sculpted portal. Built around 1930.
- 16 Kremerowska Street – Tenement house with a facade with recessed central sections and a garden in the middle, before the entrance. Designed by Henryk Lamensdorf, 1910–1912.
- 19 Kremerowska Street (43–43a Karmelicka Street) – Historic house. Designed by Jacek Matusiński, 1875.
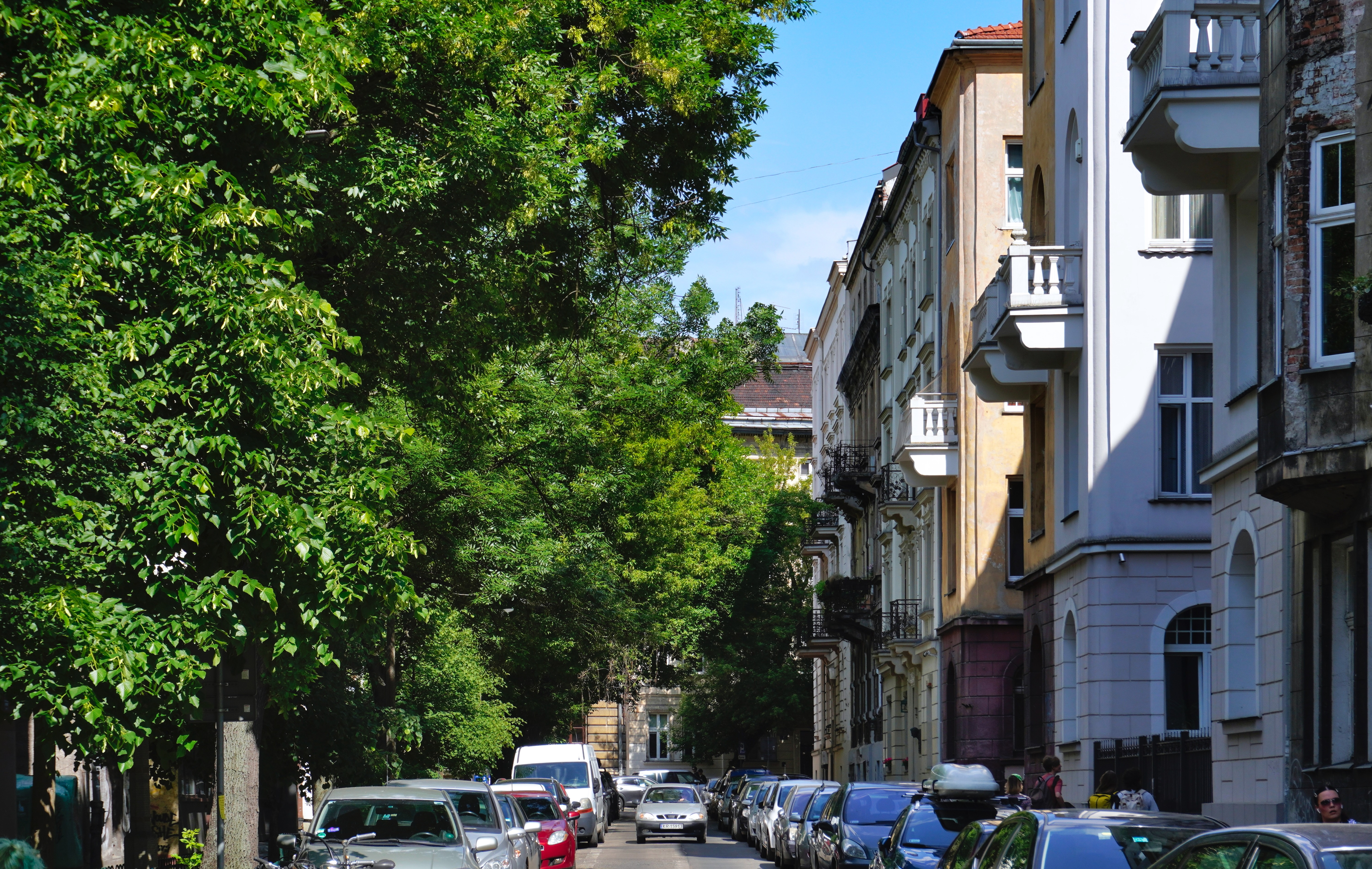
View from the intersection with Wilhelm Feldman Street to the east

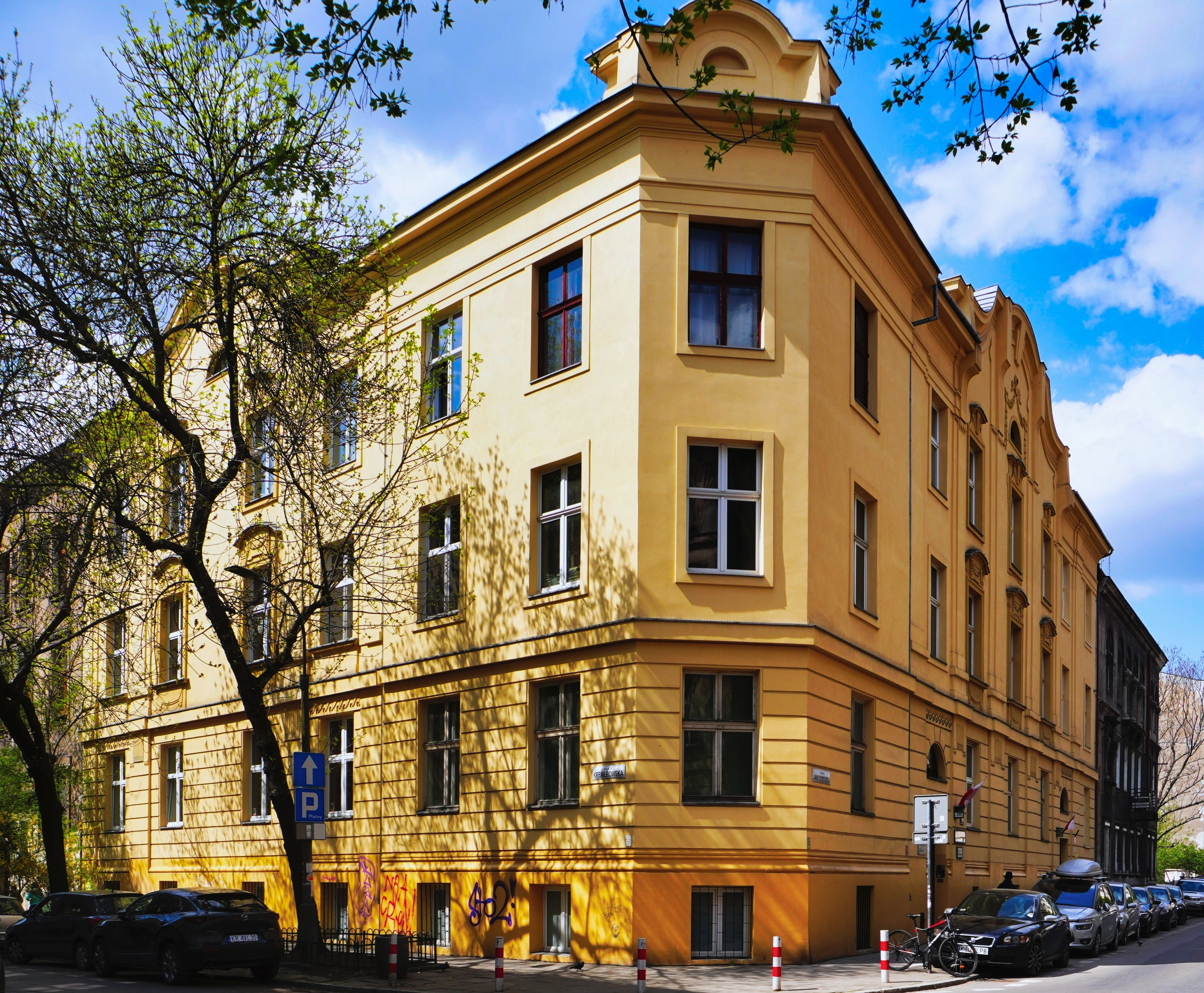
1 Kremerowska Street (10–12 Jan Sobieski Street)
Tenement house (design. Wacław Krzyżanowski and Józef Pakies, 1907)

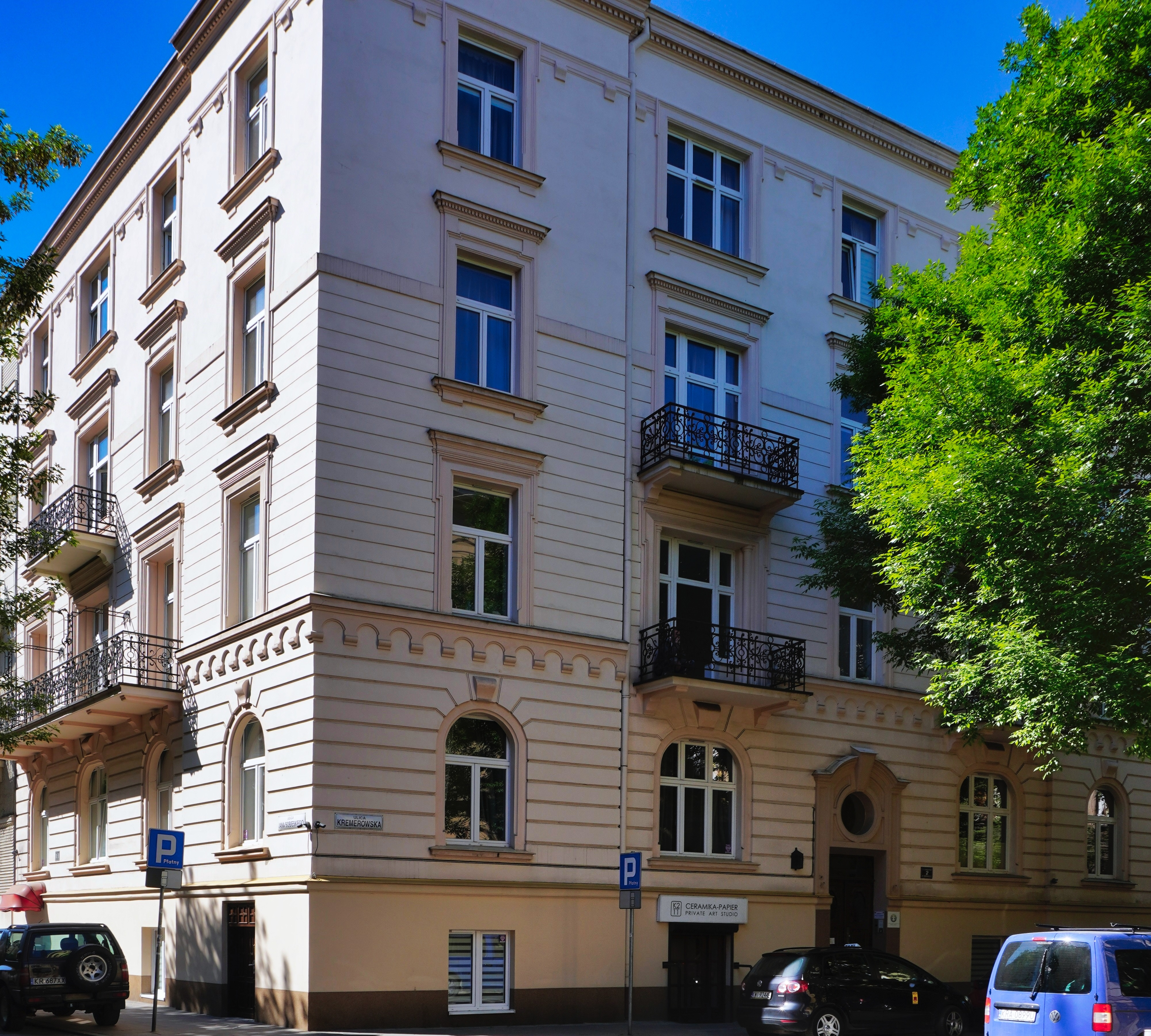
2 Kremerowska Street (8 Jan Sobieski Street)
Tenement house (design. Henryk Lamensdorf, 1913)

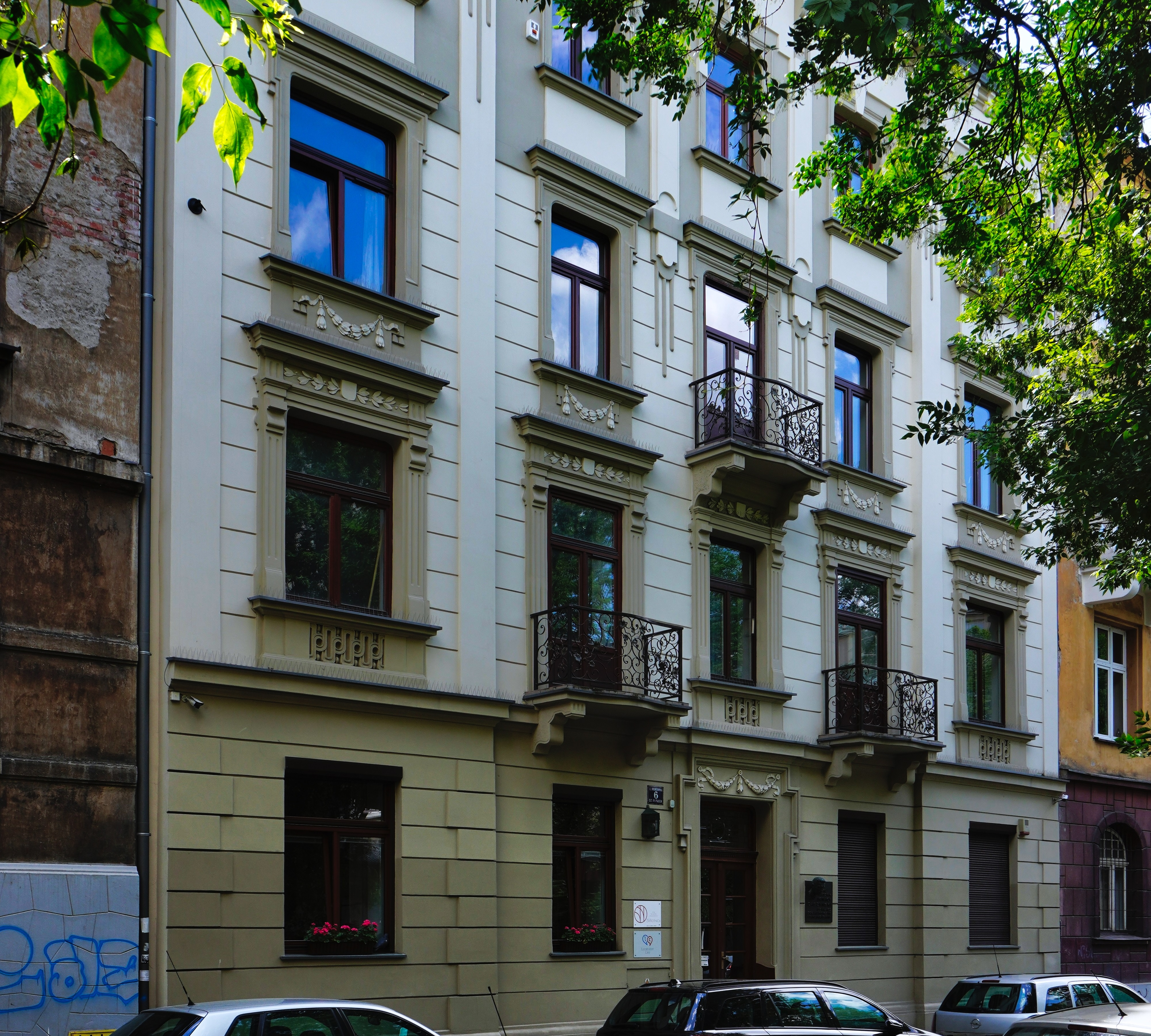
6 Kremerowska Street
Tenement house (design. Aleksander Biborski, 1910)

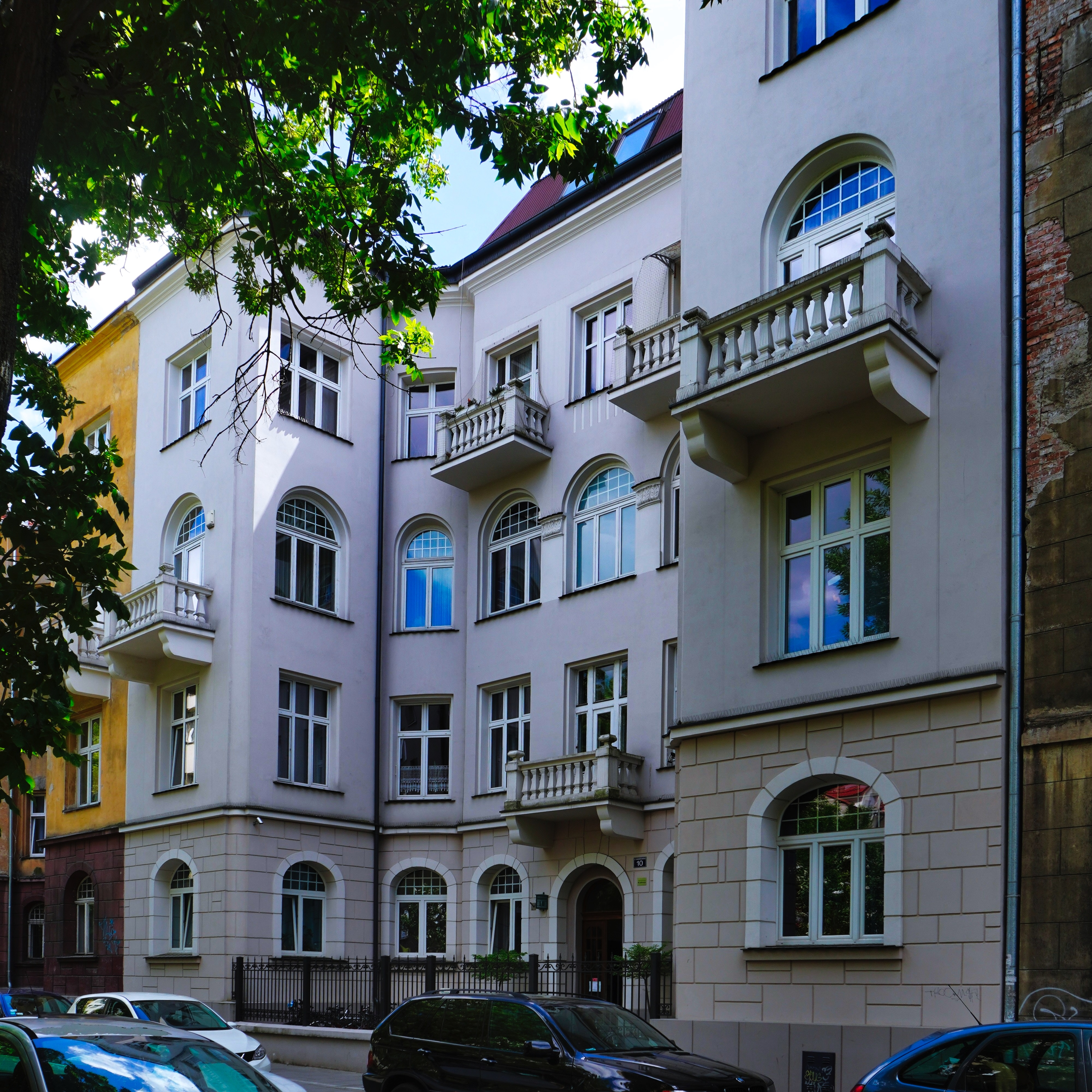
10 Kremerowska Street
Tenement house (design. Ludwik Gutman, 1910)

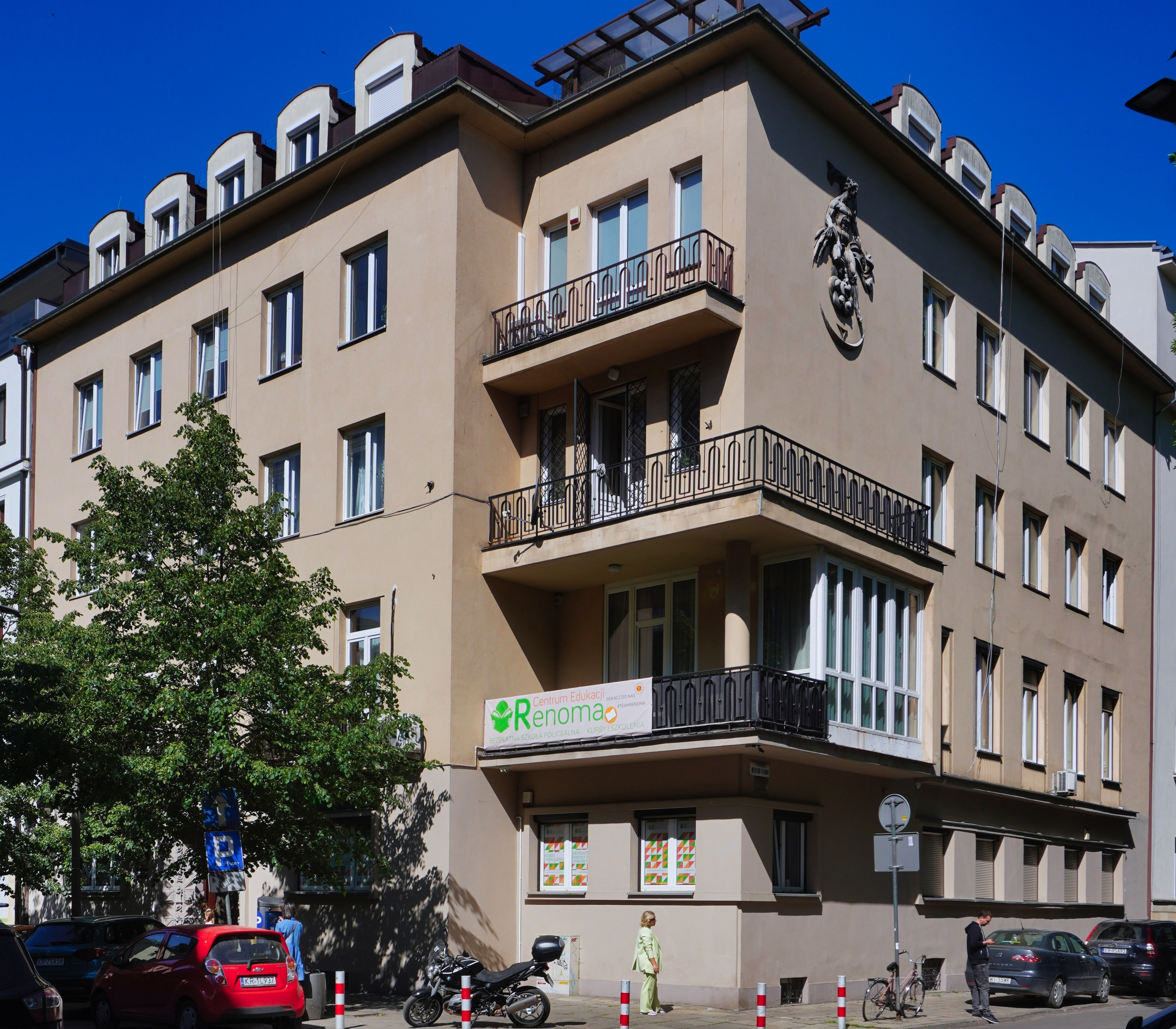
15 Kremerowska Street (2 Wilhelm Feldman Street)
Tenement house (1930)
