= Józef Pokutyński =

Polish architect

Józef Pokutyński (1859–1929) was a Polish architect.
