= Miecław's Rebellion =

11th-century conflict in Poland

- Part of Crisis of the Piast dynasty
- The Duchy of Poland in 1037, including the borders of Miecław's State
Date	c. 1038 – 1047
Location	Masovia, Greater Poland
Result	Polish victory

Belligerents
Duchy of Poland; Kievan Rus'	Miecław's State; Duchy of Pomerelia; Yotvingians

Commanders and leaders
Casimir I the Restorer; Yaroslav the Wise	Miecław †; Siemomysł

Miecław's Rebellion (Polish pronunciation: [ˈmjɛ.t͡swaf]; Polish: Bunt Miecława) was a military conflict fought from c. 1037 to 1047 between the Duchy of Poland under Casimir I the Restorer and its ally, Kievan Rus', led by Yaroslav the Wise, against the forces of Miecław, the self-proclaimed leader of a breakaway state, who was allied with the Duchy of Pomerelia and the Yotvingians. The war began with the declaration of independence of Miecław's State in Masovia from the Duchy of Poland in c. 1037. It ended in 1047 with Miecław's death and the state being reconquered by Poland.

== Background ==
Following the death of Mieszko II Lambert, King of Poland, in 1034, and the exile of his son, Casimir I the Restorer, to the Kingdom of Hungary, the Duchy of Poland fell into a period of destabilization that led to the start of a peasant uprising in 1038. Seizing the opportunity, around 1038, Miecław, the king's cup-bearer, declared the independence of his own state in Masovia from the rest of Poland, and started his own royal dynasty.

Miecław was a close associate of Mieszko II. Some scholars suggest that he may have been a descendant of the princely family that ruled Masovia before its subjugation by the Piasts, or that he was related to the Piasts (possibly belonging to a collateral branch). However, these views are not universally accepted. Kadłubek's view that Moisław was of low birth is also disputed.

== 1041 campaign ==
Casimir I the Restorer, Duke of Poland, returned to the country from exile in 1039. He had formed an alliance with Yaroslav the Wise, Grand Prince of Kiev and the leader of Kievan Rus', by marrying Maria Dobroniega. Expecting the attack from Rus', Miecław formed alliances with the Duchy of Pomerelia and the Yotvingians. In the spring of 1041, he began the campaign against Polish forces. Miecław's forces met the army led by Casimir and Yaroslav in the Battle of Pobiedziska. The battle ended with a decisive Polish victory and the destruction of Miecław's army and led to the signing of a truce between both sides.

== 1047 campaign ==
The fighting renewed in 1047, as Casimir I, together with Yaroslav, organized an attack on Masovia which led to the battle of their forces against the forces of Miecław and Pomerelia. The location of this battle remains unknown in modern times, though it was known to the 11th-century historian Gallus Anonymus, according to whom it took place near the river with the bluff edge. According to Gallus, Miecław's forces had 30 divisions of cavalry, while Casimir had three divisions. It is probable that he did not account for the forces of Yaroslav the Wise, and that both sides, in fact, had similar strength. The battle was probably initiated by Casimir I, who hoped to win before the arrival of the Pomerelian army. The battle itself was fierce, with numerous casualties on Miecław's side. It ended with a Polish victory, following which Miecław's state was reincorporated into the Duchy of Poland.

Casimir almost died in the battle but was saved by a soldier who was later rewarded for his actions. According to Gallus Anonymus, Miecław was killed in the battle. However, according to Wincenty Kadłubek in his Chronica seu originale regum et principum Poloniae, he actually escaped to Prussia, where he was later murdered.

== Notable battles ==
- Battle of Pobiedziska
- Battle of Carimir I with Miecław

== Citations ==
=== Bibliography ===
- Ł. Piernikarczyk, Masław i jego państwo (1037–1047).
- Tadeusz Łepkowski, Słownik historii Polski. Warsaw. 1973, p. 363.
- Kazimierz Odnowiciel, Śląsk, 1979.
- A. Bielowski, Kronika śląsko-polska, in Monumenta Poloniae Historica, vol. 3, Warsaw, 1961.
- Gallus Anonymus, Gesta principum Polonorum, Ossolineum, 2003, ISBN 83-04-04610-5.
- Nestor the Chronicler, Primary Chronicle, Ossolineum, 2005, ISBN 83-04-04750-0.
