= Crisis of the Piast dynasty =

Crisis of the Piast dynasty (1028-1058)
- Part of German–Polish War; Polish-Russian Wars
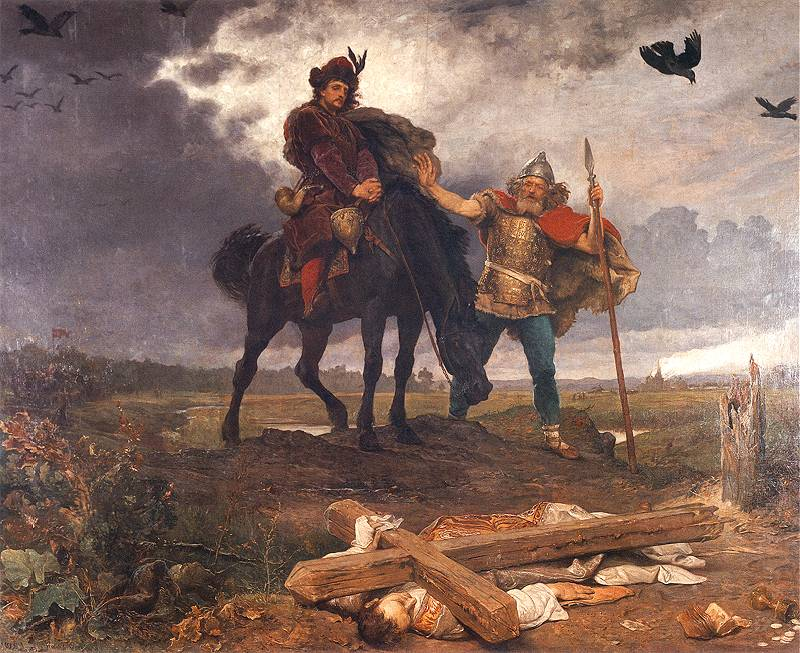
- Return of Casimir I the Restorer to Poland
| Date | 1028–1058 (30 years) |
| Location | Poland, Lusatia, Pomerania |
| Result | German-Ruthenian-Bohemian-Hungarian victory |
| Territorial changes | Loss of Lusatia, Milsko, Western Pomerania, Bełz, Principality of Nitra, Moravia and initially Silesia (Small parts remainded Bohemian) by Poland |

Belligerents
| Kingdom of Poland | Holy Roman Empire; Kievan Rus; Duchy of Bohemia; Kingdom of Hungary; Miecław's State; Yotvingians; Old Prussians |

Commanders and leaders
| Mieszko II Lambert; Casimir I the Restorer | Conrad II; Yaroslav the Wise; Bretislav I Miecław †; Stephen I of Hungary; Otto Bolesławowic; Harald Hardrada |

Casualties and losses
| Heavy | Unknown |

The Crisis of the Piast dynasty was a period of constant wars, invasions and rebellions, lasting from the death of Bolesław the Brave in 1025 until the reunification of the Polish lands by Casimir the Restorer. During the crisis, Poland suffered very severe material and demographic losses, the Polish capital Gniezno was completely destroyed, Lusatia and Milsko were taken over by the Germans, Bełz by Kievan Rus, Principality of Nitra by Hungary and Moravia and initially Silesia by Bohemia. This period ended in 1058 after Casimir the Restorer unified the country, but the Polish state was greatly weakened.

== Death of Bolesław the Brave (1025) ==
After the death of Bolesław the Brave in 1025, his second son Mieszko II Lambert became the new ruler of Poland, to the displeasure of his two brothers. Both, overlooked by his father, his older son Bezprym and his younger son Otto Bolesławowic laid claim to a share in power. Mieszko II immediately crowned himself second king of Poland, a move that was not enthusiastically welcomed in the Holy Roman Empire, where the vision of a strong Polish kingdom independent of the Empire was disliked among the elite there.

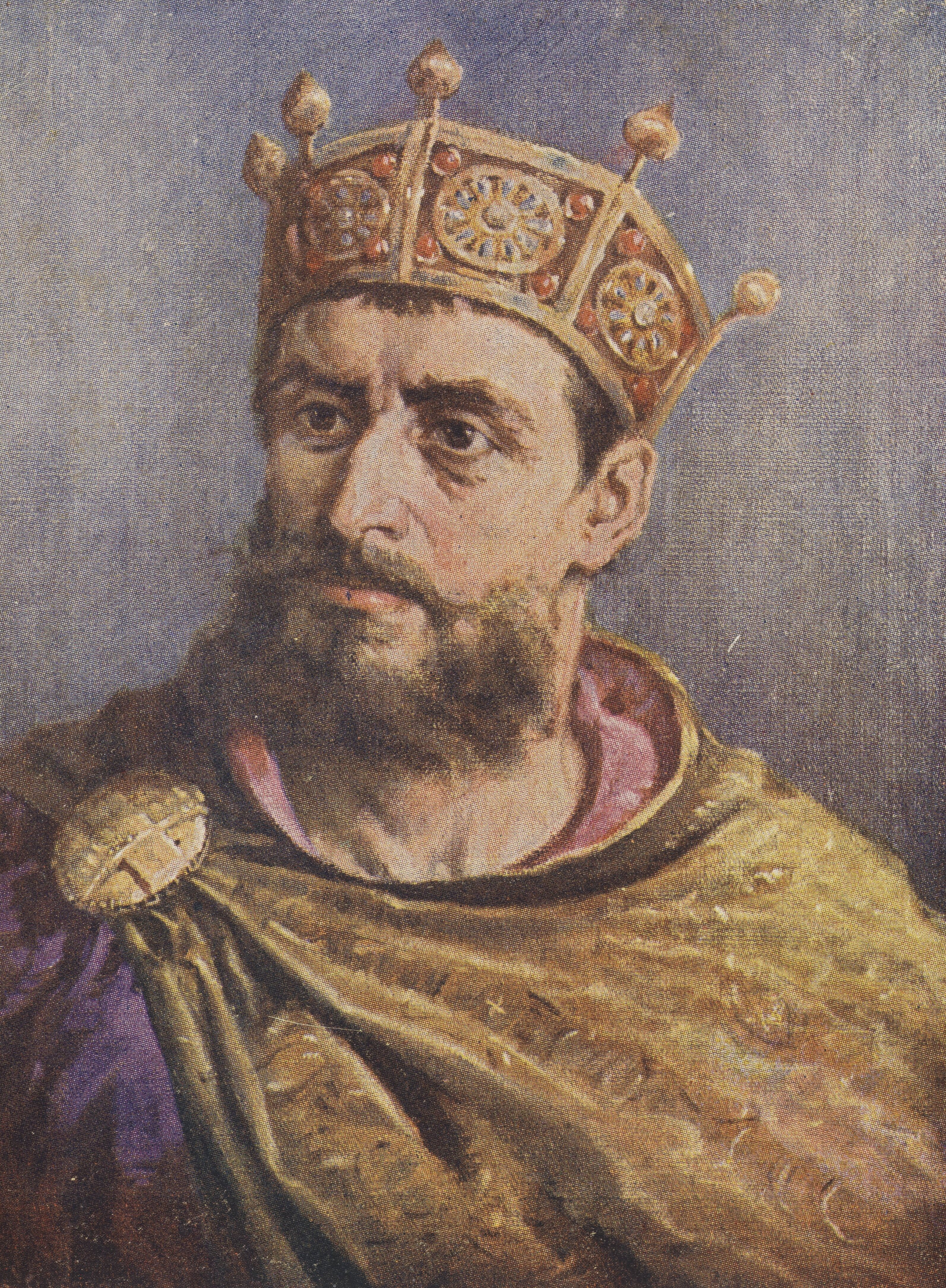
Mieszko II Lambert

Mieszko inherited a vast state from his father, encompassing Lusatia, which was claimed by the Empire, the Cherven Cities, which Kievan Rus was trying to regain, and perhaps Moravia, which the Bohemians wanted to regain. Relations with Hungary were also hostile after the wars fought during his father's reign. Independent since about 1005, pagan Western Pomerania, Prussia and Polabia, remembering Bolesław's attempts to seize them, were also hostile to Christian Poland, so Mieszko had enemies himself on all borders. Also in the country, the number of the king's opponents was growing. In addition to the brothers mentioned earlier who were jealous of the throne, there was also a growing class of magnates, reluctant to have a strong central authority, over the pagan population imposed from above by the ecclesiastical institutions managed at the time largely by foreigners who did not speak the native language.

Despite the problems, however, Mieszko tried to continue the policy of Bolesław, meddling in the internal affairs of the Holy Roman Empire, establishing cooperation with the opposition there, thus emphasizing his independence.

== Turmoil in the Holy Roman Empire ==
After the death of Henry II, Conrad II of the Salian dynasty was elected and crowned as the new German king in Mainz on September 8, 1024. Although the election was unanimous, several vassals delayed paying tribute to the new ruler. Among them was the Duke of Lorraine. In 1026, Conrad II traveled to Italy for the imperial coronation. His absence increased the activity of the anti-Emperor opposition in Germany, centered around Ernest II, Duke of Swabia, and Frederick II of Lorraine. Conrad II's opponents tried to find favor with foreign rulers, including the French King Robert II the Pious.

=== Mieszko's raid on Saxony (1028) ===
In January 1028, Polish troops invaded Saxony. Mieszko's team struck Meissen, where his sister, Margravine Regelinda, probably ruled. In addition to loot, a considerable number of captives were abducted, including the captured bishop of Brandenburg, Luizon, who probably died in Polish captivity. Mieszko II obtained the help of Count Siegfried, son of the Margrave of the Eastern March Odo, in the fighting. Mieszko's goal was to exploit antagonisms between German lords.

== First German invasion of Poland (1029) ==
The emperor accused the Polish ruler of an illegitimate coronation and declared him a usurper. Despite the treaty that was supposed to ensure peace between Poland and Germany, Conrad II soon organized a retaliatory expedition against Mieszko. The invasion must have also affected the lands of the Slavic tribe of the Veleti. In October 1028, their envoy arrived at the state convention in Pöhlde, asking the emperor for protection from Mieszko II's incursions and promising support in the fight against the Polish ruler. In the autumn of 1029, the army of Conrad II entered Lusatia and laid siege to Bautzen, but the German army did not receive the promised support from the Veleti and the expedition failed - the Polish garrison held the city despite heavy losses. Threatened by the Hungarians, the Emperor was forced to retreat.

=== German-Bohemian-Ruthenian-Hungarian coalition against Mieszko II (1030–1031) ===
Coalition against Mieszko II Lambert

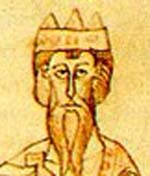
Conrad II

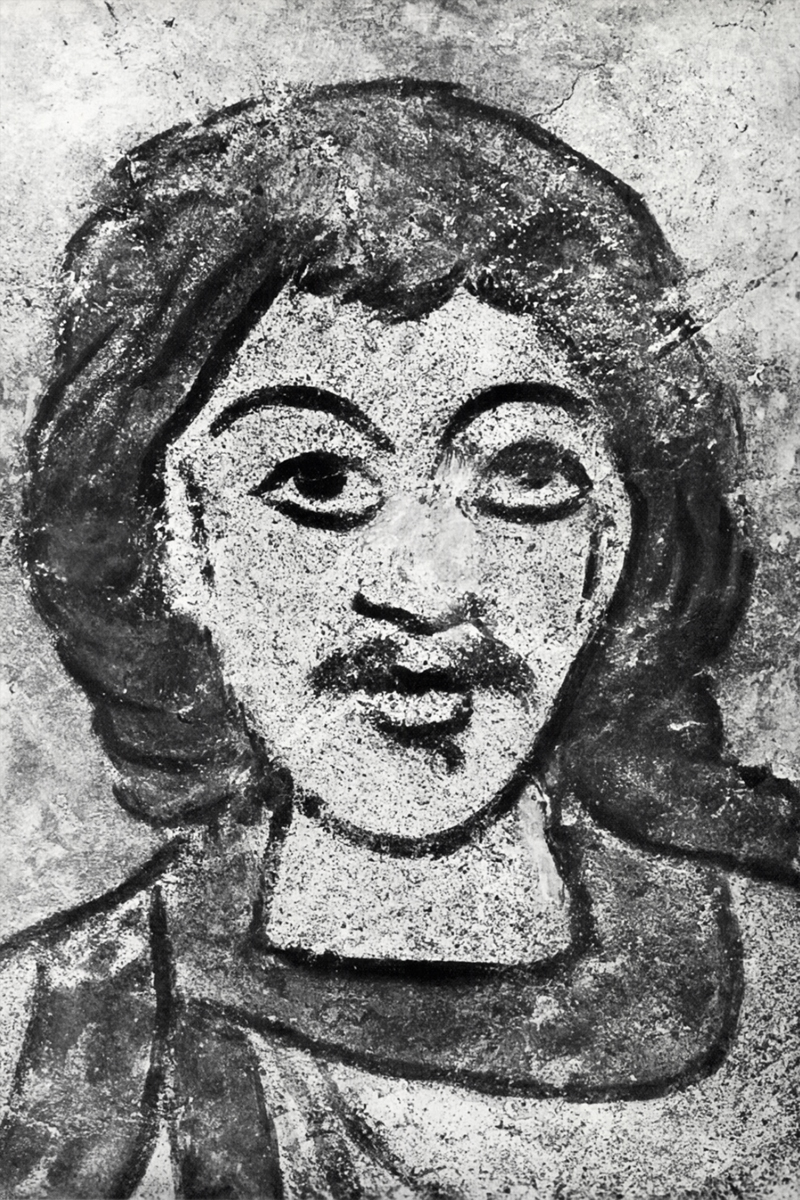
Bretislav I

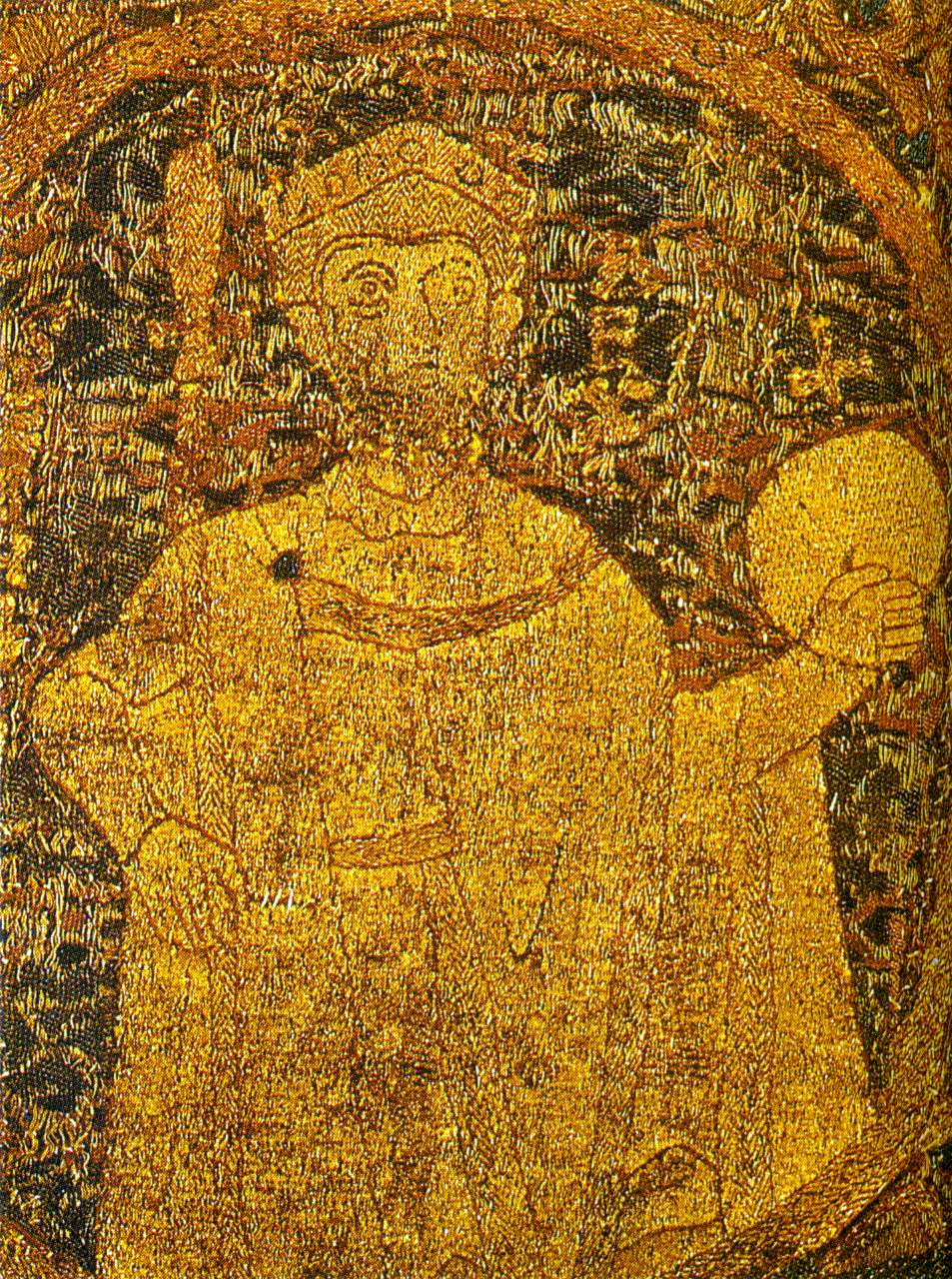
Stephen I of Hungary

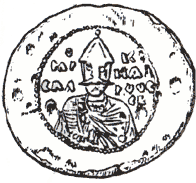
Yaroslav the Wise

It is likely that after Mieszko II took power, his two brothers were still in Poland for a short time. Soon both Otto and Bezprym found themselves outside the country. Either they were exiled by Mieszko II when he detected that they were conspiring against him with Emperor Conrad II, or they left Poland voluntarily. According to one hypothesis, Otto went to Germany probably to his sister, Regelinda, and Bezprym went to Ruthenia. It was probably Bezprym who first took advantage of Mieszko II's plight and assembled a German-Ruthenian-Hungarian-Bohemian coalition against him. The two went, probably in 1029, to Ruthenia, where they informed the Ruthenian prince Yaroslav the Wise of the military weakness of the Polish state and prompted him to attack and recapture the territories seized earlier during Bolesław the Brave's expedition to Ruthenia, and then brokered an alliance with the emperor.

=== Mieszko's second raid on Saxony (1030) ===
In 1030, Mieszko II formed an alliance with Hungary, after which he again invaded Saxony. Count Siegfried, who fought on the side of the Polish king, was killed in this campaign. Meanwhile, Mieszko's southern ally attacked Bavaria, temporarily occupying Vienna in Austria. In response, the emperor began to organize another retaliatory expedition against the Polish king, this time organizing a broader coalition. The Germans probably supported Prince Otto Bolesławowic in his claim to the Polish throne, while the Ruthenians supported Bezprym.

=== Capture of Bełz by Kievan Rus' (1030) ===
According to one of the oldest Old Ruthenian Chronicles, "Primary Chronicle," in 1030 Yaroslav the Wise went on the offensive in the east, seizing the border town of Bełz with great success.

== German-Bohemian-Ruthenian invasion of Poland (1031) ==
The emperor in 1031 made peace with Hungary, at the time allied with Mieszko II. It is likely that Stephen I, who ruled there, occupied Slavonia in return. Conrad II no longer had to fear an attack from the south and in the autumn of 1031 launched an offensive on Lusatia and Milsko. This time the German invasion was successful, and Mieszko II was forced to relinquish some lands. As a result, Bolesław the Brave's conquests, over which he had waged years of war with Henry II fell away from Poland.

While Mieszko II was busy defending Lusatia in the west, an armed expedition was coming from the east, led by Yaroslav the Wise and Mstislav the Brave, supported by the future Norwegian king Harald III. In 1031, they captured the strongholds of the ''Lachs" as far as the San and annexed the Cherven Cities to their country.

=== Mieszko II's escape to Bohemia (1031) ===
Threatened by invaders, Mieszko was forced to flee the country. He was unable to flee to Hungary, as the way was blocked by Ruthenian troops, and King Stephen of Hungary was not in his favor. Deprived of alternatives, Mieszko set out for Bohemia. There he was imprisoned and castrated at the behest of Prince Oldřich, as punishment for Bolesłav the Brave's blinding of Bohemian Prince Boleslaus III the Red.

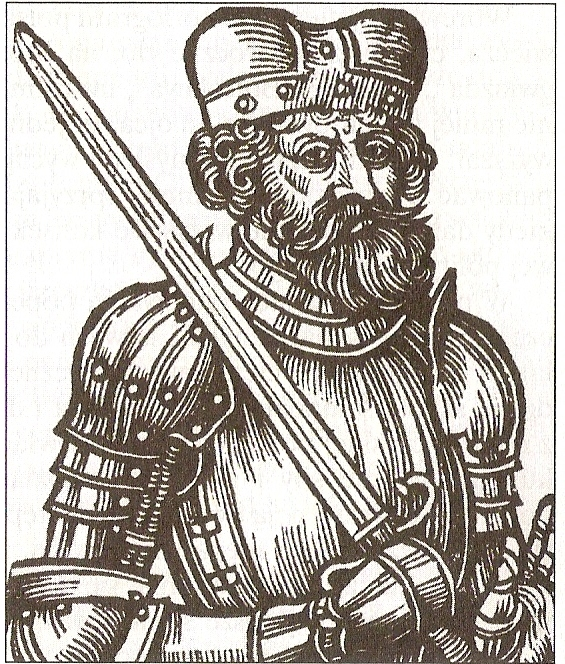
Bezprym

=== Bezprym's rule (1031–1032) ===
Mieszko's escape and imprisonment effectively marked the end of the conflict and the defeat of Poland. The invaders installed Bezprym, who was favorable to them, on the Polish throne, and immediately returned the royal crown to Conrad II, which meant the marginalization of the Piast state back to the role of a duchy, and the status of the kingdom would only be restored almost half a century later by Mieszko II's grandson Bolesław the Bold.

As a result of losing the war, Poland lost the territories of Lusatia, Milsko to Germany, Cherven Cities to Kievan Rus and probably Moravia to Bohemia and Slovakia to Hungary.

The defeat was also the beginning of a crisis that almost led to the collapse of the barely established Piast state. After Mieszko II fled and Bezprym seized power, Mieszko's wife Richeza went into exile in Germany with her sons, taking with her the Insignia of the monarch, sent back to the Emperor by Bezprym.

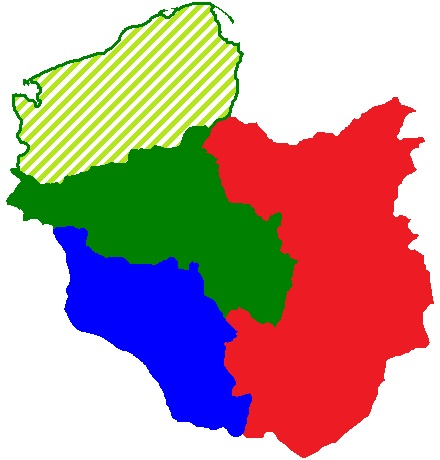
Poland in 1032

=== Assassination of Bezprym (1032) ===
According to sources, Bezprym's short reign was marked by extraordinary cruelty, the authority of the government collapsed. The state, as a result of his actions, was significantly weakened. The influence of the Holy Roman Empire on Polish affairs increased. According to the ''Hildesheim Annals'', he died murdered in the spring of 1032, probably inspired by Otto and Mieszko.

After Bezprym's death, as agreed at the Merseburg congress, Poland was divided into three parts that year. Mieszko II regained power as prince of one of the three districts. After the death of Otto and Bezprym, he reunited the state in 1033, but failed to regain the crown or restore stable structures of monarchical power.

During his reign, the so-called pagan reaction took place.

== Pagan Uprising (1032) ==
=== Religion in Poland prior to christianization ===
Polytheism, worship of Svarog, the sky god, prevailed in the Polish lands before the adoption of Christianity. The forces of nature identified with many deities were worshipped, as well as the spirits of ancestors. Some deities occurred simultaneously among many tribes, while others, with a local scope, were given special reverence only within a single tribe or even a neighboring association. Similarly, each family had its own ancestral spirits. Professing polytheism, the Slavs believed that the god of a foreign tribe was just as real as the god of their tribe. The practice of Slavic religion allowed for the possibility of abandoning the worship of a particular deity in favor of another if that deity were to prove stronger.

Baptism of Poland was primarily political, and Mieszko I's behavior at the time testifies to his great discernment and foresight. In the short term, it allowed him to solidify his alliance with Bohemia, and in the long term, it had the effect of consolidating his power by religiously legitimizing it and, at the same time, helped solidify the independent position of the Polish state in Christian Europe.

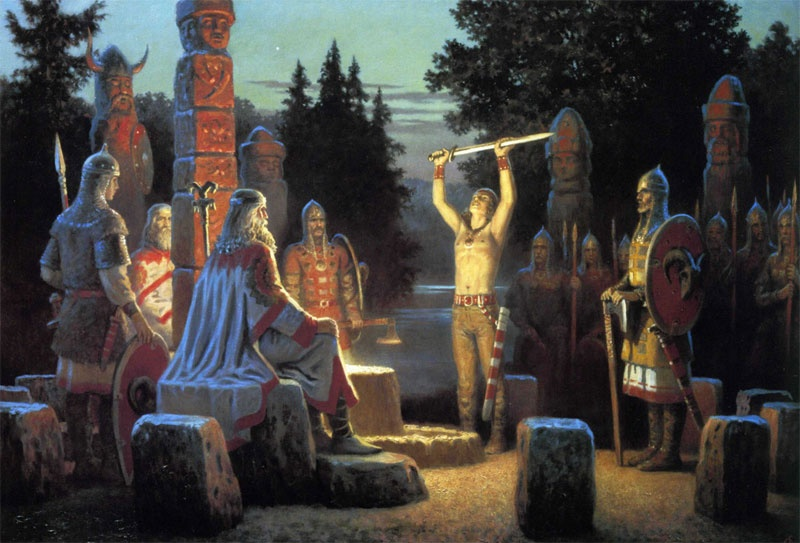
Slavic Pagans

After the adoption of Christianity, clergy began to be drawn to Poland. This was beneficial for the development of the country, as they were the best educated people of the time. They taught the new religion, and also introduced Latin writing to Poland. This gave rise to written literature in the Polish lands. Monasteries and churches were centers of intellectual and artistic life. The clergy also knew the secrets of farming. They taught the Polans how to drain wetlands, introduced new tools and the two-field system, which led to the development of farming. The adoption of Christianity contributed to the development of construction. Romanesque stone churches were built, which initiated a new style in architecture previously unknown in the Polish lands. Sacred painting and sculpture appeared. In time, cathedral schools were also established, which educated young people.

On the other hand, however, for the inhabitants of settlements far from the centers, brought up in pagan culture, the Christian faith remained foreign despite baptism. In 966, apart from Mieszko, only his immediate circle was baptized. After the arrival of Jordan's mission, mass baptisms of the members of Mieszko's team and the inhabitants of the suburbs were arranged. However, despite the Christianization missions - including even the later ones carried out by Otto of Bamberg in 1124-1125 and 1128 - the majority of the population in practice still remained pagans.

There was practically no time for individual persuasion and explanation of the principles of the new faith. The old Christian catechesis - the time of learning the faith and individual maturation for baptism - was neglected, being limited to pre-baptismal sermons that showed the greatness of Christianity and the impotence of pagan gods - which was further proven by destroying their temples and statues. Slavic deities were identified by Christians with devils. The practice of faith included attendance at Sunday mass, observance of fasts, and reception of several sacraments. Guarding their observance was the state authority, sometimes using coercion. According to Thietmar, teeth were knocked out in Poland for breaking the fast.

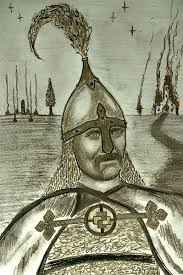
Bolesław the Forgotten, leader of the pagan uprising

While tribal-wide cults were eliminated easily, sacred and magical forms of family life were deeply rooted in consciousness and culture. As late as the 12th century, residents of mid-forest settlements burned their dead by pagan custom on stakes, rather than burying them as Christians did.

=== Pagan Uprising (1032) ===
In times of crisis, or when oppression by the state, the magnates and the Church increased, riots broke out in the Polish lands. We do not have detailed information on their course. According to the historian Gerard Labuda, it is possible that some group of pagan priests led by Bolesław the Forgotten, operating underground, took advantage of the discontent of the population and pointed out as the enemy - the God of the Christians. Yearbooks of the time often write in one sentence that the people rose up against the mighty and Christianity, without elaborating. Some historians suggest that "abandonment of the Christian faith" played a secondary role in the uprisings, and their purpose was to fight against the exploitation of the magnates, including the clergy, and state institutions. According to surviving accounts, in 1038, when the Czechs entered riot-stricken Poland, they found the temples of Krakow, Gniezno and other cities intact. There was no indication that there had been a revival of paganism in Poland. Perhaps chroniclers of the time called the insurgents pagans to discredit them in the eyes of the Christian public.

== Miecław's rebellion (1037) ==
Following the death of Mieszko II Lambert, King of Poland, in 1034, and the exile of his son, Casimir I the Restorer, to the Kingdom of Hungary, the Duchy of Poland fell into a period of destabilization that led to the start of a peasant uprising in 1038. Seizing the opportunity, around 1038, Miecław, the king's cup-bearer, declared the independence of his own state in Masovia from the rest of Poland, and started his own royal dynasty.

== Peasant uprising (1037–1038) ==
Poland in 1038

Due to the thinness and fragmentary nature of the sources, we do not know exactly how the uprising took place. It probably erupted in 1038 and was a reaction to the imposition of heavy burdens on the population, which it had to bear for the benefit of the state, the magnates and the Catholic Church. After the period of confusion following the Ruthenian invasion and the weakening of monarchical power, the state was no longer able to suppress the discontent of the population, which found an outlet in an uprising directed against the magnates and Christianity. Supporters of the pre-Christian religion found a wide and positive public resonance, especially since Christianity in Poland at that time was very young and superficial.

...slaves rose up against the masters, liberators against the noble-born, elevating themselves to the government, and kept some of them in captivity in reverse, killed others, and married their wives in a bawdy manner and criminally shredded the eminence (...). Moreover, having abandoned the Catholic faith - which we cannot say without weeping and lamenting - they raised a revolt against the bishops and priests of God...

— Gallus Anonymus, Gesta principum Polonorum

Information of similar content regarding the revolt of peasants and slaves can be found in the Kievan Chronicle.

...And there was a great destruction in the Polish lands, and having arisen, the people killed the bishops and priests and their lords...

— Kievan Chronicle

The unrest bypassed only Mazovia, where Mieszko II's former heir-apparent Miecław (Masław) proclaimed himself prince.

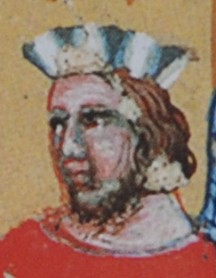
Bretislav I

== Bretislav's invasion (1038–1039) ==
Duke Bretislav I of Bohemia, observing events in Poland, realized that the state of anarchy and interregnum that prevailed there was an opportunity for him to regain Silesia and Lesser Poland, once lost to Bolesław, and at the same time weaken his neighbor. In the summer of 1038, a Czech army crossed the Polish border. Deprived of leadership, the Polish forces probably offered little resistance. Bretislav easily occupied Silesia and moved further north.

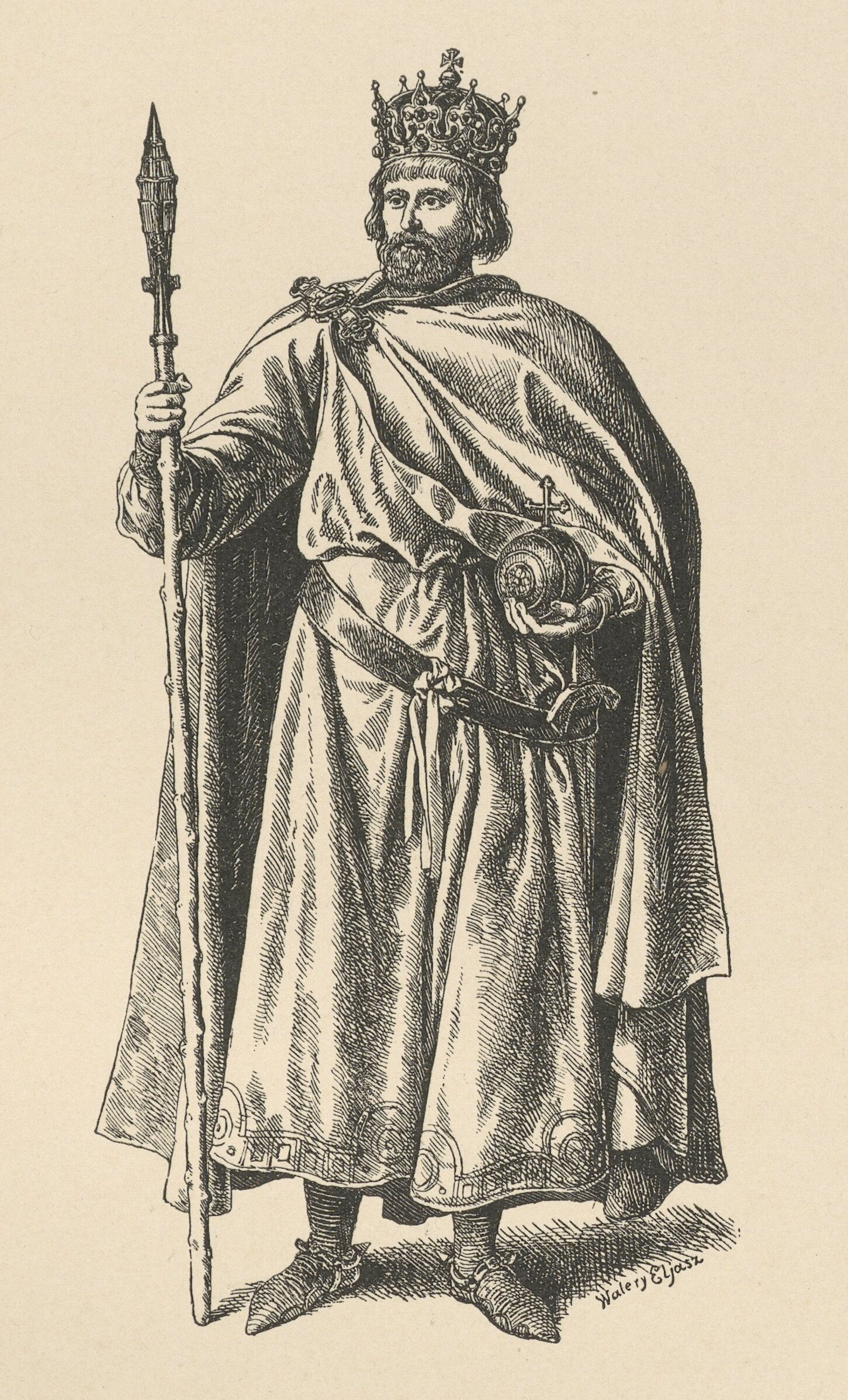
Casimir I the Restorer

Also in riot-ridden Greater Poland, cities and towns fell almost without a fight before the invading army. The attackers captured Poznań, Gniezno and Giecz, among others, and, according to Kosmas, also Kraków, but the latter fact is disputed by historians.

Bretislav did not intend to annex Greater Poland to Bohemia, as he did with Silesia. Instead, however, he decided to ravage it to the point of destroying the power of its northern neighbor once and for all. Above all, he stripped the district of its ecclesiastical treasures, which fell into his hands. Bishop Severus of Prague, who was present with the king, also seized valuable relics - the bodies of St. Adalbert, Gaudentius and the corpses of the Five Brothers Martyrs, which were transported from Gniezno to Prague and ceremoniously deposited in St. Vitus Cathedral in Hradcany. The booty of the Czechs in Gniezno also included a gold cross donated by Mieszko I, golden tablets set with jewels and many other valuables. In addition, Bohemian soldiers demolished the religious buildings in Poznan that had been erected by Mieszko I to celebrate the baptism of Poland, and ransacked the tomb of that ruler. Bretislav also ruined a castle and a stone church on the island of Lednickie Lake in Greater Poland.

As Gall Anonymous wrote: "And so long did the said towns remain abandoned, that in the church of St. Adalbert the Martyr and St. Peter the Apostle wild animals found lairs."

In addition to the destruction and plunder, Bretislav began the slaughter of the Polish population. Inhabitants of Greater Poland's lands were taken as slaves and then driven to Bohemia and settled there as labourers. From Giecz, whose population surrendered without a fight, Bretislav resettled numerous craftsmen to Bohemia, to a place henceforth called Hedčany.

=== Consequences of Bretislav's invasion ===
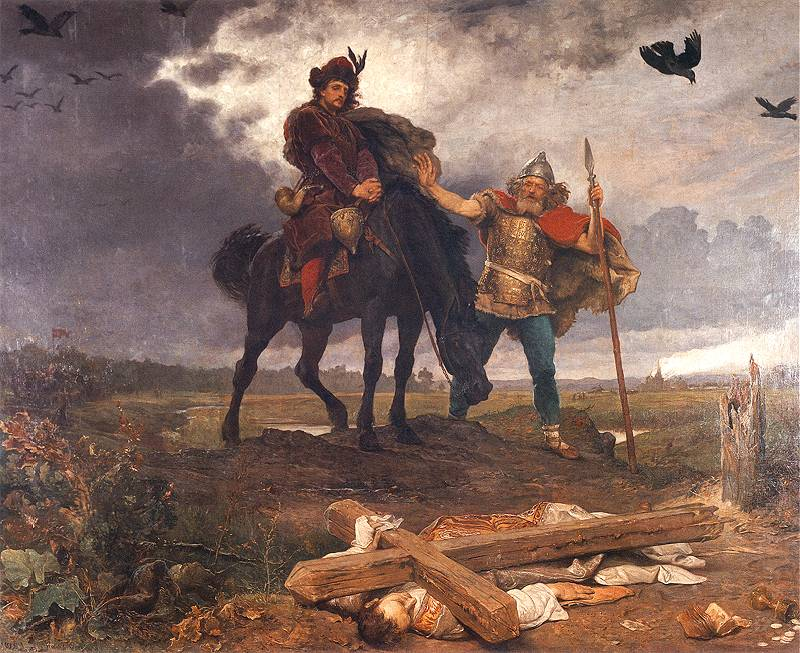
Return of Casimir I the Restorer to Poland

Bretislav's invasion was one of the greatest tragedies that befell the Polish lands during the Middle Ages, and its effects seriously threatened the continued existence of the Polish state. Gdańsk Pomerania also separated. The situation was complicated by Prussian and Pomeranian incursions into Greater Poland, which was gripped by anarchy.

However, the complete disintegration of the Polish state and the rise of the power of Bohemia was not in the interest of the emperor, Henry III, who did not want any eastern state to become too strong. At the end of 1039, Casimir returned to the country with armed German assistance. In addition, he received help from Yaroslav the Wise, prince of Kievan Rus, who also did not want to allow permanent anarchy to prevail in Poland. With this help, Casimir regained power in Greater Poland, where the population accepted him as a legitimate monarch. With the help of German and Ruthenian troops, he also broke Mazovian separatism and regained Gdansk Pomerania. Later, he resumed the war with Bohemia by regaining Lesser Poland and Silesia, from which, however, he had to pay tribute to Bohemia.

== Reunification of the country (1039–1050) ==
=== Battle of Pobiedziska (1041) ===
Expecting the attack from Rus', Miecław formed alliances with the Duchy of Pomerelia and the Yotvingians. In the spring of 1041, he began the campaign against Polish forces. Miecław's forces met the army led by Casimir and Yaroslav in the Battle of Pobiedziska. The battle ended with a decisive Polish victory and the destruction of Miecław's army and led to the signing of a truce between both sides.

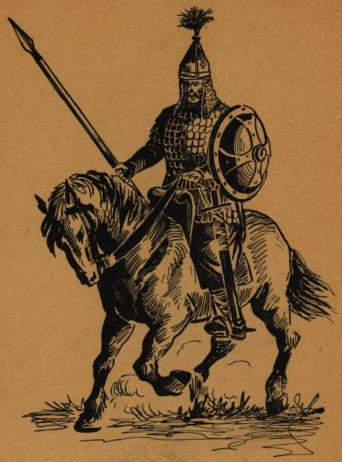
Polish early Piast warrior

=== Battle between Miecław and Casimir I and the fall of Miecław's State (1047) ===
In 1047 Casimir I, together with Yaroslav, had organized the attack on Masovia, which lead to the battle of their forces against the forces of Miecław and Pomerelia. The location of the battle remains unknown, though it was known to the 11th-century historian, Gallus Anonymus, according to whom, it took place near the river, with the bluff edge. The battle was probably initiated by Casimir I, who hoped to win before the arrival of the Pomerelian army. The battle itself was fierce, with numerous casualties on Miecław's side. The battle ended with Polish victory, following which, Miecław's state was reincorporated into Poland.

Casimir had almost died in the battle but was saved by a soldier, who later had been rewarded for his actions. According to Gallus Anonymus, Miecław had died in the battle. However, according to Wincenty Kadłubek in his Chronica seu originale regum et principum Poloniae, he had escaped to Prussia, where he was murdered.

According to Gallus Anonymus, Miecław's forces had 30 divisions of cavalry, while Casimir, 3 divisions. It is probable that he did not account for the forces of Yaroslav the Wise, and that both sides, in fact, had a similar number of forces.

== Aftermath ==
In 1050, Casimir the Restorer again ventured into Silesia and eventually occupied it. This prompted a complaint from Bretislav I to Emperor Henry, which led to a congress at Goslar in November of the same year, at which Casimir averted the threat of German intervention. The dispute over these lands was finally settled at the Quedlinburg congress. Silesia remained with Poland, and Casimir the Restorer pledged to pay an annual tribute to the Czechs of 500 mints of silver and 30 mints of gold.

In 1046, he renewed the bishopric of Krakow. Aron, a monk, became the new bishop. In 1051, the bishopric of Wrocław was renewed with its seat in Ryczyn, which was probably placed under the authority of the Metropolitan of Magdeburg. Jerome became the new bishop of Wrocław. In 1051 Casimir supported Emperor Henry in an expedition against Andrew I of Hungary, during which Polish troops took part in the Battle of Rabanica.

Casimir, however, failed to renew the archbishopric of Gniezno. He is credited with the foundation of the Benedictine monastery in Tyniec, circa 1044, and the foundation of the Benedictine abbey monastery in Mogilno circa 1045. Instead of maintaining a permanent troop of warriors, he initiated the custom of granting land to knights in exchange for military service. His efforts to rebuild the country after the crisis earned Casimir the nickname Restorer.

Casimir the Restorer died on March 19, 1058, in Poznań and was buried in the Cathedral of Saints Peter and Paul there. During his long reign, which lasted eighteen years, he led the restoration of Polish statehood and regained for the Piasts the state within such boundaries as he had received from Mieszko II Lambert.

== See also ==
- Mieszko II Lambert
- Casimir I the Restorer
- Otto Bolesławowic
- Bezprym
- German-Polish War (1028-1031)
- Conrad II
- Miecław's State
- Yaroslav the Wise
- Bretislav I
- Battle of Pobiedziska
- Battle of 1047 between Casimir I and Miecław
