= Battle of 1047 between Casimir I and Miecław =

1047 battle during the Miecław's Rebelion

- Part of the Miecław's Rebellion and the crisis of the Piast dynasty
Date	1047
Location	Mazovia
Result	Polish victory

Belligerents
Duchy of Poland; Kievan Rus'	Miecław's state Duchy of Pomerelia

Commanders and leaders
Casimir I the Restorer; Yaroslav the Wise	Miecław †

Strength
Unknown, including 3 Polish cavalry divisions	30 Miecław's cavalry divisions

Casualties and losses
Unknown	Heavy

The Battle of 1047 between Casimir I and Miecław (Polish: Bitwa Kazimierza I z Miecławem 1047 roku) was fought in 1047 during the Miecław's Rebellion, between the Duchy of Poland led by duke Casimir I the Restorer and its ally, Kievan Rus' led by grand prince Yaroslav the Wise, against the forces of Miecław, the self-proclaimed monarch of a country in Mazovia which broke away from Poland, aided by his ally, the Duchy of Pomerelia. Fought as part of a campaign led by Casimir I into the breakaway state's territory, it ended with Polish and Ruthenian victory, and its reincorporation into Poland. There are two accounts regarding Miecław's fait after the battle, with him aither dying during the fight or escaping to Prussia, where he was murdered. The location of the battle remain unknown, being fought somewhere in Mazovia near an unidentified river.

== Background ==
The Duchy of Poland in 1037, including the borders of Miecław's State.

Following the death of duke Mieszko II Lambert, the ruler of the of Duchy of Poland, in 1034, and the exile of his son, Casimir I the Restorer, to the Kingdom of Hungary, the country entered into a period of destabilization, which led to the outbreak of the peasant uprising in 1038. Seizing the opportunity, around 1038, Miecław, the former cup-bearer in the court of Mieszko II Lambert, led the formation of a country in Mazovia, which broke away from Poland, proclaiming himself as its monarch.

Duke Casimir I the Restorer, the ruler of Poland, returned to the country from his exile in 1039. He formed an alliance with grand prince Yaroslav the Wise, the ruler of Kievan Rus', by marrying his sister, Maria Dobroniega. Expecting the attack from Kievan Rus', Miecław formed an alliance with the Duchy of Pomerelia and the tribe of the Yotvingians. In the spring of 1041, he begun the campaign against Polish forces. They fought with the army led by Casimir I and Yaroslav, in the Battle of Pobiedziska, which ended with a decisive Polish and Ruthenian victory and destruction of Miecław's army, leading to the signing of a truce between both sides.

== Course of the battle ==
According to writings of Gallus Anonymus, Miecław's forces had 30 divisions of cavalry, while Casimir had 3 divisions of calvary, and being aided by an unknown number of forces of Yaroslav the Wise, as well as volunteers. The truce between both states was broken in 1047, with Casimir I and Yaroslav the Wise attacking Miecław's state in Masovia. It culminated in a battle fought against combined forces of Miecław and the Duchy of Pomerelia, at an unspecified location near an unidentified river in Mazovia. The battle was most likely initiated by Casimir I, who might have hopped to win before the arrival of the Pomerelian forces. Miecław's side have suffered heavy casualties during the battle. During the course of the fight, Casimir I was almost killled, being saved by a soldier, who he later rewarded for his actions. The battle ended with Polish and Ruthenian victory, following which, Miecaław's state was reincorporated into Poland. There are two conflicting accounts regarding Miecław's fait after the battle. According to the writings of Gallus Anonymus, he died in the fight, while according to The History of Poland, a historical cronicle written by Wincenty Kadłubek in the 13th century, Miecław escaped to Prussia, where he was murdered.

== See also ==
- Battle of Pobiedziska, another battle during the Miecław's Rebelion
