= Mieszko Kazimierzowic =

- Born: 16 April 1045
- Died: 28 January 1065 (aged 19)
- Family: House of Piast
- Father: Casimir I the Restorer
- Mother: Maria Dobroniega of Kiev

Mieszko Kazimierzowic (Kazimierzowic means son of Kazimierz) (16 April 1045 – 28 January 1065) was a Polish prince member of the House of Piast. According to some scholars, he was probably Duke of Kuyavia since 1058 until his death.

== Life ==
He was the third son of Casimir I the Restorer by his wife Maria Dobroniega, daughter of Vladimir the Great, Grand Duke of Kiev. He was named after his paternal grandfather, Mieszko II Lambert. He had three brothers: Bolesław II Szczodry, Władysław Herman and Otto. His sister was Świętosława, later Queen Consort of Bohemia.

Gallus Anonymus, an author of Gesta principum Polonorum written in the early 12th century, put Mieszko third in order, among his brother. Modern historian, Janusz Bieniak, has supposed that Mieszko was the second son of Casimir I and was older than Władysław Herman, but most scholars disagree with this hypothesis. The date of Mieszko's birth was given by Rocznik krakowski (Kraków Annals). This source omitted dates of birth of Mieszko's brothers. Kazimierz Jasiński thought that Rocznik was started shortly before Mieszko's birth and this was the reason for absence of his older brothers. Przemysław Wiszewski supposed that Casimir I chose Mieszko as his successor and that this in turn was the real reason for absence of his older brothers in Annals. This conception was criticized by other scholars.

Mieszko was 13 years old, when his father died. Some historians suppose that he had his own province. Józef Płocha stated that it was Mazowsze. According to the theory of Gerard Labuda and Henryk Łowmiański, Mieszko received Kuyavia after his father's death in 1058. Łowmiański's argument is that knights from Kuyavia supported Zbigniew, son of Władysław Herman, in 1097. According to Łowmiański this probably meant that there was a tradition of semi-independence in the region.

There is no mention of Mieszko's influence on Polish politics.

Mieszko died on 28 January 1065. Year of death was noted by Rocznik kapituły krakowskiej, while day by Necrologium monasterii superioris Ratisbonensis. He died unmarried and childless.
