= Battle of Pobiedziska =

- Part of Miecław's Rebellion during the crisis of the Piast dynasty
Date	1041
Location	Pobiedziska, Greater Poland, Duchy of Poland 52°29′N 17°17′E
Result	Polish victory

Belligerents
Duchy of Poland; Kievan Rus'	Miecław's State

Commanders and leaders
Casimir I the Restorer; Yaroslav the Wise	Miecław

Battle of Pobiedziska (Note: Polish: Bitwa pod Pobiedziskami) was fought in 1041, during the Miecław's Rebellion, between the Duchy of Poland led by Casimir I the Restorer and its ally, Kievan Rus' led by Yaroslav the Wise, against the forces of Miecław, the self-proclaimed leader of his state. The battle was fought near the settlement of Pobiedziska in the Greater Poland. It ended with a decisive Polish victory and the destruction of Miecław's army and led to the signing of the truce between both sides, which lasted until 1047.

== Before the battle ==
The Duchy of Poland in 1037, including the borders of Miecław's State.

Following the death of Mieszko II Lambert, king of Poland, in 1034, and the exile of his, Casimir I the Restorer, to the Kingdom of Hungary, the state fell into a period of destabilization within the Duchy of Poland, that led to the start of the 1038 Peasant Uprising. Seizing the opportunity, around 1038, the cup-bearer Miecław had formed the state in Masovia, declaring its independence from Poland, and started his own royal dynasty.

Casimir I the Restorer, duke of Poland, had returned to the country from his exile in 1039. He had formed an alliance with Yaroslav the Wise, Grand Prince of Kiev, the leader of Kievan Rus', via the marriage of Maria Dobroniega with Casimir. Expecting the attack from Rus', Miecław had formed an alliance with Pomeranian and Yotvingian tribes.

== Battle ==
In the spring of 1041, Miecław had begun the campaign against Polish forces. His forces had fought with the army led by Casimir and Yaroslav, near the settlement of Pobiedziska. The battle ended with a decisive Polish victory and destruction of Miecław's army and led to the signing of the truce between both sides.

== Citations ==
=== Bibliography ===
- Ł. Piernikarczyk, Masław i jego państwo (1037–1047).
- Tadeusz Łepkowski, Słownik historii Polski. Warsaw. 1973, p. 363.
- Kazimierz Odnowiciel, Śląsk, 1979.
- A. Bielowski, Kronika śląsko-polska, in Monumenta Poloniae Historica, vol. 3, Warsaw, 1961.
