= Miecław's state =

Former country in Europe

Miecław's State Państwo Miecława (Polish)
- c. 1037–1047
- Territory of the Miecław's State
- Capital: Płock
- Common languages: Polish
- Religion: Slavic paganism
- Leader
  - c. 1037–1047: Miecław
- Historical era: Middle Ages
  - Declaration of independence: c. 1037
  - Battle of Pobiedziska and truce with Poland: 1041
  - Defeat by Casimir I: 1047
Preceded by	Succeeded by
Duchy of Poland	Duchy of Poland

Miecław's State (Polish pronunciation: [ˈmjɛ.t͡swaf]; Polish: Państwo Miecława) was an 11th-century country located in Mazovia, in Central Europe, with the capital in Płock. It was formed around 1037 by Miecław by breaking away from the Duchy of Poland during the crisis inside the country. It existed until 1047, when Casimir I the Restorer, duke of Poland, reconquered the state.

== History ==
=== Mazovia ===
In the early Middle Ages, the territory of Mazovia was inhabited by the West Slavic tribe of Mazovians. In the 9th century, Mazovia was an economically more backward region than southern and western Poland. Therefore, unifying tendencies were less developed than among other tribes.

The exact date of Mazovia's inclusion into Piast dynasty' state is unknown, but it is believed that it was part of it at the beginning of Mieszko I's reign. This is indicated, for example, in the Dagome iudex document, which placed Poland under the protection of the papacy. During the reign of Mieszko I and Bolesław the Brave, Poland was Christianized.

=== Miecław's Rebellion ===
Following the death of Mieszko II Lambert, king of Poland, in 1034, and the exile of his son, Casimir I the Restorer, to Kingdom of Hungary, the state had fallen into a period of destabilization within the Duchy of Poland, that led to the start of the 1038 Peasant Uprising. Seizing the opportunity, around 1038, the cup-bearer Miecław had formed the state in Mazovia, declaring its independence from Poland, and started his own royal dynasty.

Casimir I the Restorer, duke of Poland, had returned to the country from his exile in 1039. He had formed an alliance with Grand Prince Yaroslav the Wise, the leader of Kievan Rus', via the marriage of Maria Dobroniega with Casimir. Expecting the attack from Rus', Miecław had formed an alliance with Pomeranian and Yotvingian tribes. In the spring of 1041, he had begun the campaign against Polish forces. Miecław's forces had fought with the army led by Casimir and Yaroslav, in the battle of Pobiedziska. The battle ended with a decisive Polish victory and destruction of Miecław's army and led to the signing of the truce between both sides.

The fighting had begun again in 1047, as Casimir I, together with Yaroslav, had organized the attack on Mazovia, which led to the battle of their forces against the forces of Miecław and Pomerelia. The battle ended with Polish victory, following which, Miecław's state was reincorporated into Poland. According to Gallus Anonymus, Miecław had died in the battle. However, according to Wincenty Kadłubek in his Chronica seu originale regum et principum Poloniae, he had escaped to Prussia, where he was murdered.

== Economy ==
It is generally accepted that due to the chaos caused by the 1038 Peasant Uprising and the Czech invasion (1038 or 1039), many refugees from the south and west arrived in Mazovia, contributing to the region's economic development. An anonymous author known as Gallus described the situation at the time as follows:

There was a certain man named Miecław, a cup-bearer and servant of his father Mieszko, and after Mieszko's death, in his own opinion, a prince and leader of the Mazovians. At that time, Mazovia was so densely populated by Poles, who, as has been said, had fled there previously, that the fields were teeming with ploughmen, the pastures with cattle, and the towns with inhabitants.

— Gallus Anonymus (translated by R. Grodecki)

Coins were minted within Miecław's state, most likely dating from the 1140s, on a fairly large scale, as evidenced by the fact that at least 45 of them have survived to this day. These coins were not examples of imitation, where coins were minted similar to others but containing less precious metal. These coins were larger than average for the period. According to data collected by historians, only Cześnik Mięcław in Mazovia possessed sufficient wealth to achieve such a goal.

== Society ==
Due to Miecław's active contact with the Balts, a number of authors have claimed that a return to pre-Christian religion occurred in Miecław's state. Others (such as V. Korolyuk ) wrote that Mazovia was untouched by either pagan reaction in Poland or other unrest; moreover, priests and boyars fled to this region from the rebels.

== See also ==
- Pagan reaction in Poland

== Citations ==
=== Bibliography ===
- Wielkopolska Chronicle
- Ł. Piernikarczyk, Masław i jego państwo (1037–1047).
- Королюк, В. Д. "5". Древнепольское государство (in Russian).
- Tadeusz Łepkowski, Słownik historii Polski. Warsaw. 1973, p. 363.
- Kazimierz Odnowiciel, Śląsk, 1979.
- A. Bielowski, Kronika śląsko-polska, in Monumenta Poloniae Historica, vol. 3, Warsaw, 1961.
- Королюк, В. Д. "7". Древнепольское государство (in Russian).
