= Pagan reaction =

Pagan reaction is reversal of Christianization. It may refer to:

- Pagan reaction in Rome under emperor Julian the Apostate (4th century)
- Pagan reaction in England under Eadbald of Kent (7th century)
- Pagan reaction in Poland (1030s)
- Pagan reaction in Lithuania (1260s)
