= Milsko =

Milsko could refer to

- Milsko, Lubusz Voivodeship in Poland, or
- The historical name for Upper Lusatia
