= Jędrzejów Abbey =

Cistercian abbey in Poland

Coordinates: 50°38′18″N 20°18′01″E

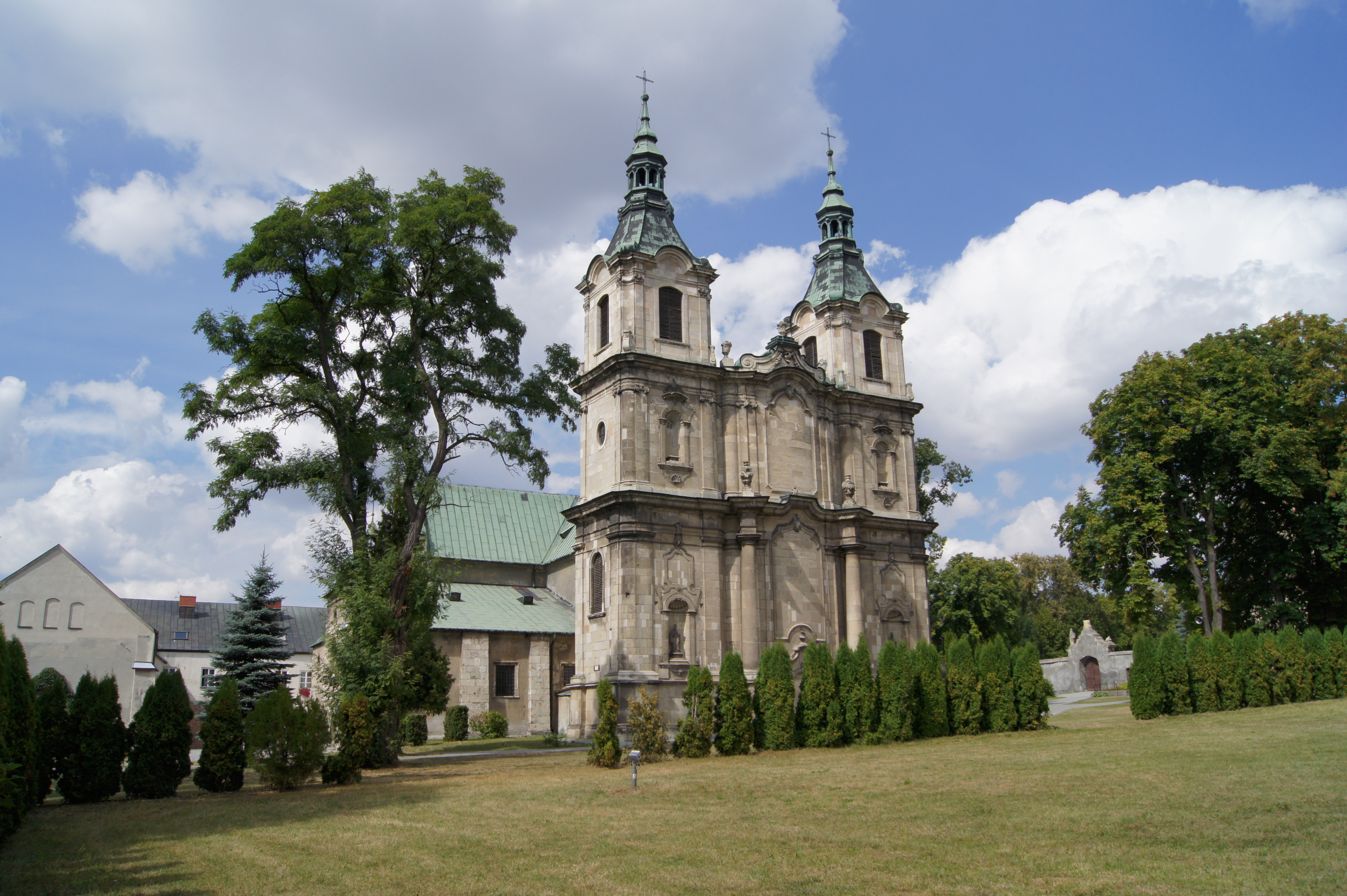
Jędrzejów Abbey

Jędrzejów Abbey is a Cistercian abbey founded in the 12th century in Poland. The town of Jędrzejów grew around it. Blessed Polish bishop of Kraków and historian, Wincenty Kadłubek, lived in this monastery for 5 years and was buried there. In the 15th century, the sculptor Veit Stoss (Polish: Wit Stwosz) worked there.

== External sources ==
Media related to Church of Blessed Wincenty Kadłubek, Jędrzejów at Wikimedia Commons
