= Pagan reaction in Poland =

Disruptive insurrection in the Kingdom of Poland

Poland, 1030s. Stippled area marks the probable extent of the pagan reaction.

The pagan reaction in Poland (Polish: Reakcja pogańska w Polsce) was a series of events in the Kingdom of Poland in the 1030s that culminated in a popular uprising or rebellion, or possibly a series of these, that destabilized the Kingdom of Poland.

== Background ==
Dissatisfaction with the process of Christianization, which had started after the Baptism of Poland in 966, was one of the factors that led to the uprising. The Roman Catholic Church in Poland sustained substantial losses, with many churches and monasteries destroyed, and priests killed. The spread of the new Christian religion had been coupled with growth of the territories and central power of the king. In addition to anti-Christian sentiments, the rebellion showed elements of a peasant uprising against landowners and feudalism. Also present was a struggle for power between the king and some of the nobility. Anita Prazmowska notes, "Historians have concluded that in effect two overlapping revolutions had taken place simultaneously: a political and a pagan revolution."

== Rebellion ==
While Frucht states that the uprising overthrew King Mieszko II of the Piast dynasty, others say it started after his death in 1034.^{[a]} Gerard Labuda, who provides an overview of Polish historiography of the period, gives 1032 as the date when the pagan reaction started, and he notes that historians give other dates for the start of another uprising or uprisings, referencing 1034, 1037, 1038 and 1039.

In any case, Poland in the early 1030s was torn by a number of conflicts, and in 1031 Mieszko II had to briefly seek refuge in Bohemia after losing a civil war to his brother Bezprym, before returning to reclaim the Polish lands in 1032.

The pagan reaction and related uprisings and rebellions of the time, coupled with foreign raids and invasions, threw the young Polish realm into chaos. Among the most devastating of the foreign contributions was a raid by Duke Bretislaus I of Bohemia in 1039, which pillaged Poland's first capital, Gniezno.

The destabilization wrought by these events was so severe that historians doubt that anyone can be considered Poland's ruler in the late 1030s; the name of one of the pretenders, Bolesław the Forgotten, illustrates ("with a proper irony", writes Vlasto) the complexity and obscurity of the situation. Dvorník lists no ruler for Poland in 1034–40, pointing instead to a "dynastic struggle".

== Outcome ==
According to some historians, the 1030s pagan uprising marks the end of the earliest period of Polish history, under the "First Piast Monarchy". Returning to Poland around 1040, Mieszko II's son reunited most of the Polish lands and became known as Casimir the Restorer. In the 1040s, he also fought a civil war against Miecław (who created his own state), which some authors see as a continuation of the 1030s struggles.

== See also ==
- Slavic mythology
- Christian mythology
- Paganism

== Notes ==
a The circumstances of his death are unclear; some historians suggest he may have been assassinated.
