= Miecław =

Self-proclaimed leader of separatist state between c. 1038 and 1047

Leader of Miecław's State
- Reign: c. 1038–1047
- Died: 1047

Miecław (Note: Also: Masław, Mojsław and Miesław; Latin: Meczzlavus, Meczzlaus, Meczslaus, Meslaus) (Polish: [ˈmjɛ.t͡swaf]; 10th/11th century – 1047) was a cup-bearer of king Mieszko II Lambert, who in c. 1038 had proclaimed independence of the state that he ruled, from the Duchy of Poland, beginning the rebellion that lasted until his death in 1047.

== History ==
The Duchy of Poland in 1037, including the borders of Miecław's State.

Following the death of Mieszko II Lambert, king of Poland, in 1034, and the exile of his son, Casimir I the Restorer, to Kingdom of Hungary, the state had fallen into a period of destabilization within the Duchy of Poland, that led to the start of the 1038 Peasant Uprising. Seizing the opportunity, around 1038, the cup-bearer Miecław had formed the state in Masovia, declaring its independence from Poland, and started his own royal dynasty.

Casimir I the Restorer, duke of Poland, had returned to the country from his exile in 1039. He had formed an alliance with Yaroslav the Wise, Grand Prince of Kiev, the leader of Kievan Rus', via the marriage of Maria Dobroniega with Casimir. Expecting the attack from Rus', Miecław had formed an alliance with Pomeranian and Yotvingian tribes. In the spring of 1041, he had begun the campaign against Polish forces. Miecław's forces had fought with the army led by Casimir and Yaroslav, in the battle of Pobiedziska. The battle ended with a decisive Polish victory and destruction of Miecław's army and led to the signing of the truce between both sides.

The fighting had begun again in 1047, as Casimir I, together with Yaroslav, had organized the attack on Masovia, which led to the battle of their forces against the forces of Miecław and Pomerelia. The location of the battle remains unknown in modern times, though it was known to the 11th-century historian, Gallus Anonymus, according to whom, it took place near the river, with the bluff edge. According to him, Miecław forces had 30 divisions of cavalry, while Casimir, 3 divisions. It is probable that he did not account for the forces of Yaroslav the Wise, and that both sides, in fact, had a similar number of forces. The battle was probably initiated by Casimir I, who hoped to win before the arrival of the Pomerelian army. The battle itself was fierce, with numerous casualties on Miecław's side. The battle ended with Polish victory, following which, Miecław's state was reincorporated into Poland. According to Gallus Anonymus, Miecław had died in the battle. However, according to Wincenty Kadłubek in his Chronica seu originale regum et principum Poloniae, he had escaped to Prussia, where he was murdered.

== Citations ==
=== Bibliography ===
- Ł. Piernikarczyk, Masław i jego państwo (1037–1047).
- Tadeusz Łepkowski, Słownik historii Polski. Warsaw. 1973, p. 363.
- Kazimierz Odnowiciel, Śląsk, 1979.
- A. Bielowski, Kronika śląsko-polska, in Monumenta Poloniae Historica, vol. 3, Warsaw, 1961.
- Gallus Anonymus, Gesta principum Polonorum, Ossolineum, 2003, ISBN 83-04-04610-5.
- Nestor the Chronicler, Primary Chronicle, Ossolineum, 2005, ISBN 83-04-04750-0.
