= Pobiedziska =

Town in Greater Poland Voivodeship, Poland

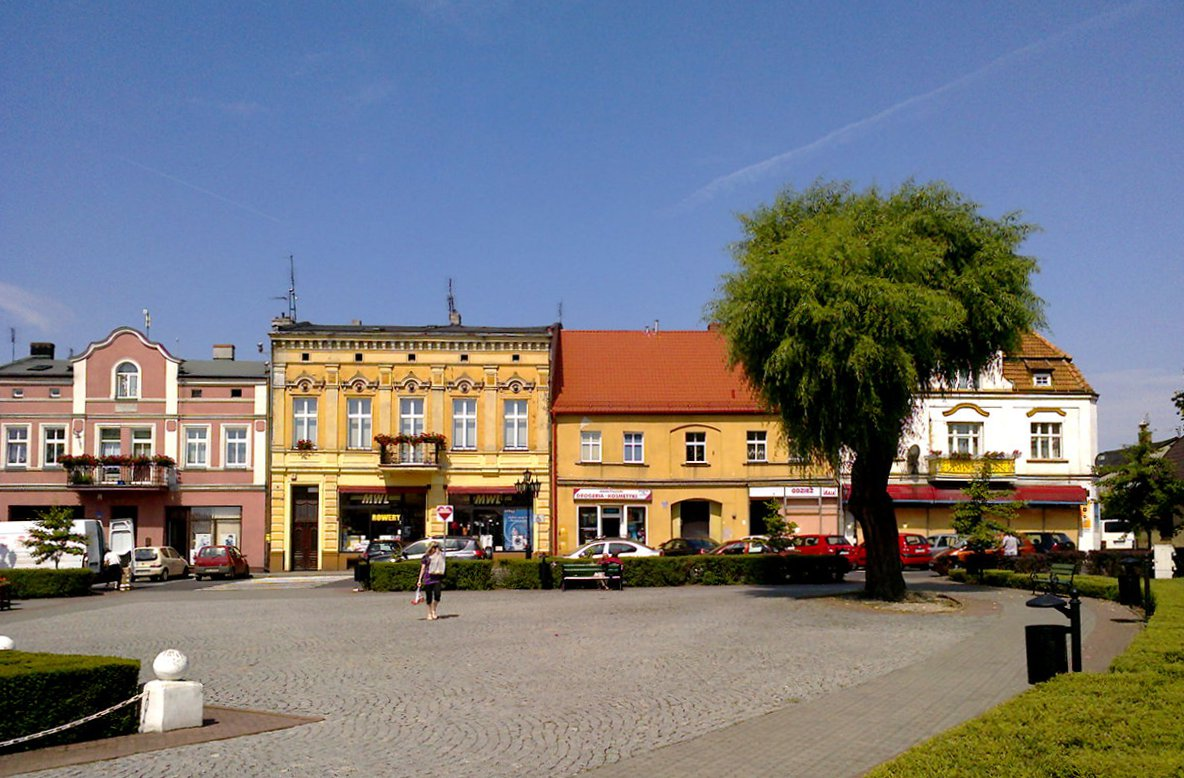
- The Pobiedziska market square

- Flag Coat of arms

- Location within Poland
- Coordinates: 52°29′41″N 17°16′2″E
- Country: Poland
- Voivodeship: Greater Poland
- County: Poznań
- Gmina: Pobiedziska
- Town rights: 1257

Area
  - Total: 10.16 km^{2} (3.92 sq mi)

Population (2006)
  - Total: 8,329
  - Density: 819.8/km^{2} (2,123/sq mi)
- Time zone: UTC+1 (CET)
  - Summer (DST): UTC+2 (CEST)
- Postal code: 62-010
- Vehicle registration: PZ, POZ
- Climate: Dfb
- Primary airport: Poznań–Ławica Airport
- Website: http://www.pobiedziska.pl/

Pobiedziska ([pɔbʲɛˈd͡ʑiska]; German: Pudewitz) is a town in Poznań County, Greater Poland Voivodeship, in west-central Poland, with 8,329 inhabitants as of the year 2006. It is also the seat of the administrative district (gmina) called Gmina Pobiedziska.

== Etymology ==
The town's name comes from the word pobieda meaning victory. It was named by Casimir I the Restorer in 1048 AD, possibly to commemorate his defeat of Masław, a rebellious Masovian namiestnik.

== History ==
In 1257, Pobiedziska was granted town privileges by Przemysł I of Greater Poland, making the town independent from the Ostrów Lednicki castellany. In 1331, the town was destroyed by the Teutonic Knights and it took many years to recover. It was a royal town of the Kingdom of Poland, administratively located in the Gniezno County in the Kalisz Voivodeship in the Greater Poland Province. The town was often visited by Władysław Jagiełło. In 1423 he funded the construction of a Church of the Holy Spirit as well as a hospital for the poor.

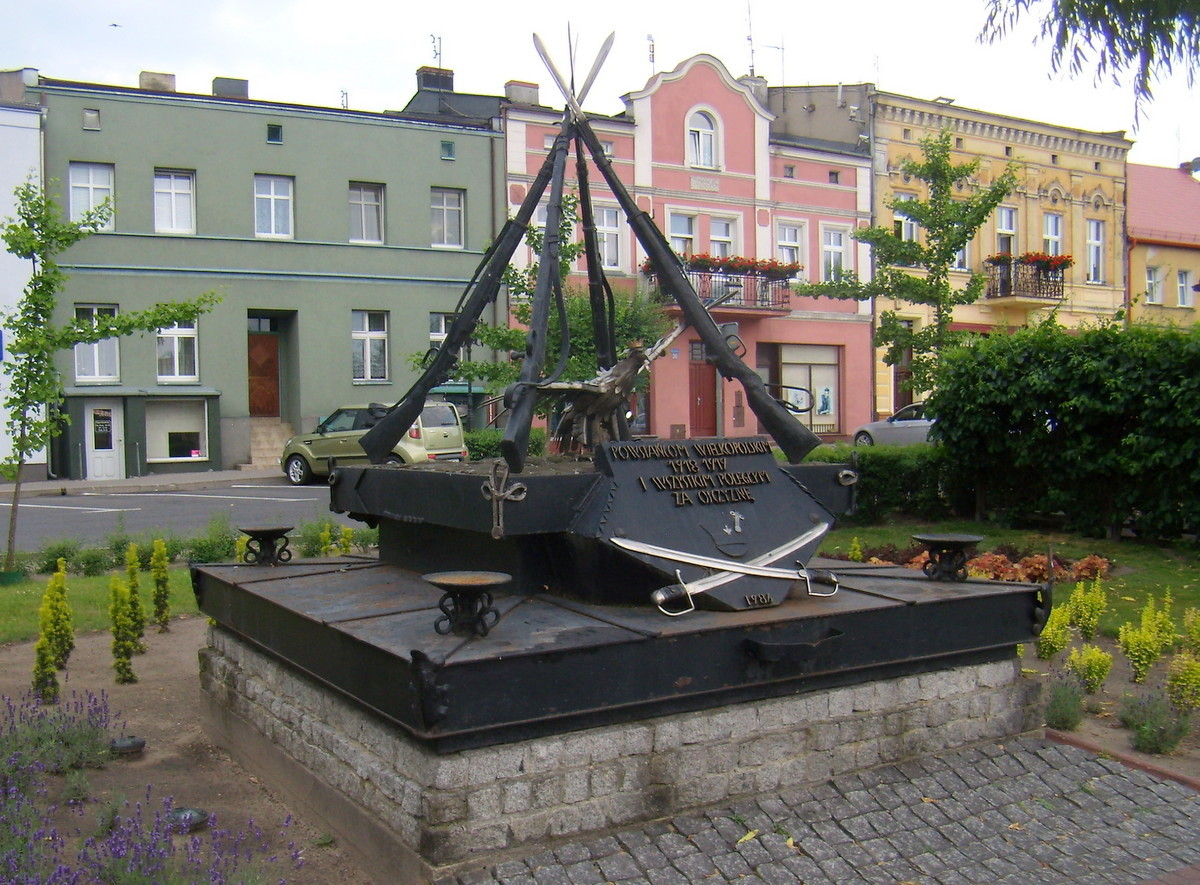
Monument of Polish Soldiers who fought in the Greater Poland Uprising (1918–1919)

Due to the Second Partition of Poland, the town fell under Prussian control in 1793. After the successful Greater Poland uprising of 1806, it was regained by Poles and included within the Duchy of Warsaw. After its dissolution, it was re-annexed by Prussia in 1815, and from 1871 it was also part of the German Empire. On December 29, 1918, the inhabitants of Pobiedziska took control of the town from German officials and disarmed the police and settlers. On January 4, 1919, Poles from Pobiedziska formed a 400-strong battalion which fought in the Greater Poland Uprising (1918–1919), including the battle for Inowrocław.

Following the joint German-Soviet invasion of Poland, which started World War II in September 1939, the town was occupied by Germany until 1945. The first expulsions of 218 Poles were carried out in December 1939. Several Poles who were either born or lived and worked in Pobiedziska were murdered by the Russians in the Katyn massacre in 1940. A local unit of the Wielkopolska Organizacja Wojskowa Polish resistance organization was founded already in 1939, and the following year it became part of the larger Wojskowa Organizacja Ziem Zachodnich organization. Mieczysław Golus, commander of the local unit of the Union of Armed Struggle, was arrested by the Germans in 1942 and then sentenced to death and executed the following year.

== Demographics ==
Historical population

Year	Pop.	±%
1880	2,255	—
1890	2,428	+7.7%
1900	2,855	+17.6%
1910	3,397	+19.0%
1921	3,363	−1.0%

Year	Pop.	±%
1931	3,745	+11.4%
1939	4,452	+18.9%
1950	3,767	−15.4%
1960	5,008	+32.9%
2010	8,748	+74.7%

== Sights ==
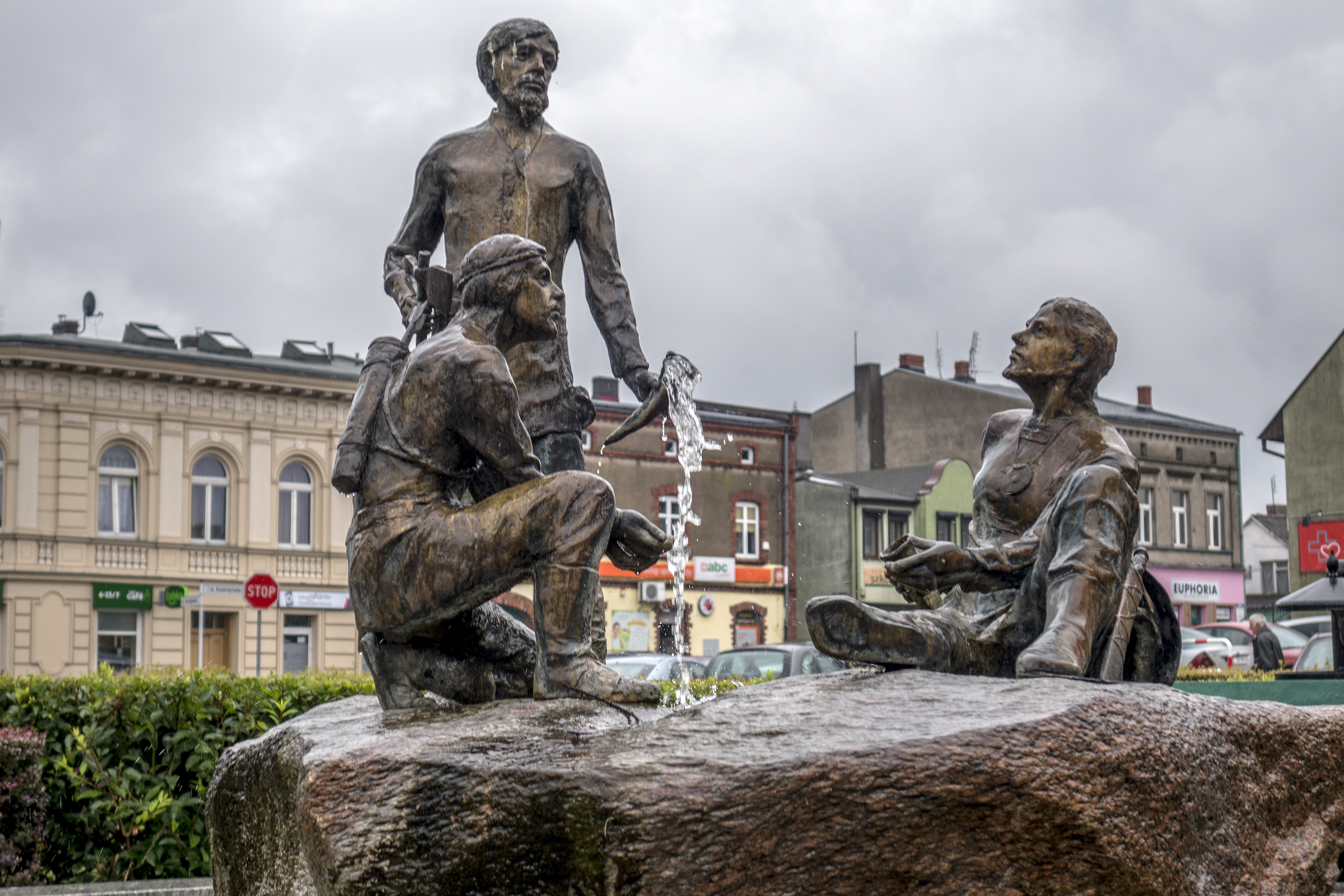
Lech, Czech, and Rus' Fountain

Sights of Pobiedziska include:

- Rynek (Market Square) with colourful old townhouses and the Greater Poland Uprising (1918–1919) Monument, a statue of Jesus Christ and the Lech, Czech, and Rus' Fountain
- Gothic Saint Michael Archangel church
- Monument to Casimir I the Restorer
- Lakes: Biezdruchowskie, Małe, Dobre
- Medieval open-air museum
- Miniature park
- Neoclassical Holy Spirit church
- Convent of the Society of the Sacred Heart
- Former home and memorial of Michał Kozal, Polish bishop murdered by Nazi Germany in the Dachau concentration camp, Blessed of the Catholic Church.
- Memorials to local victims of World War II

== Transport ==
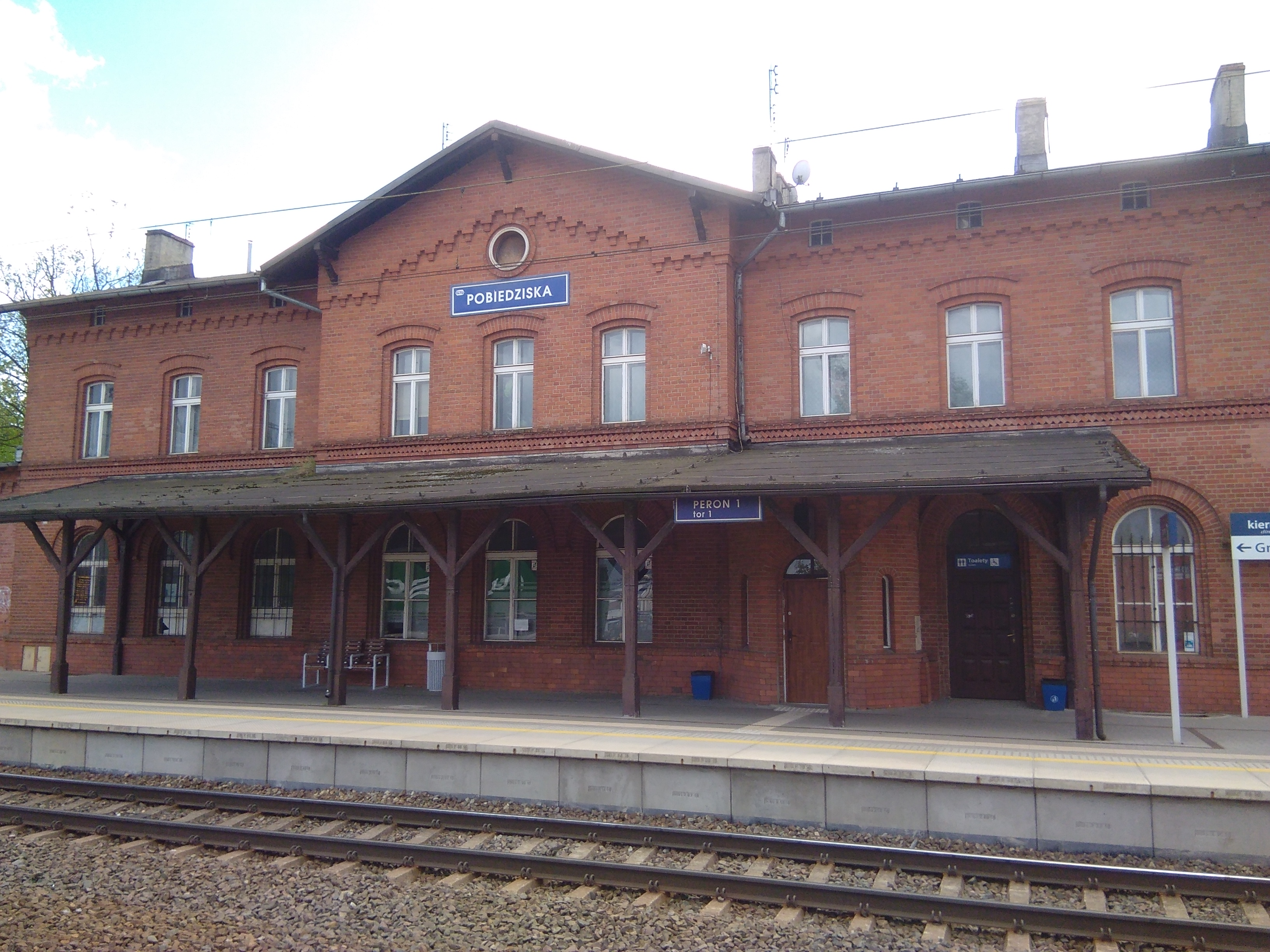
Pobiedziska railway station

There are two railway stations in the town: Pobiedziska and Pobiedziska Letnisko, and the voivodeship road 194 passes through the town.

The nearest airport is Poznań-Ławica Airport.

== Sport ==
Pobiedziska is home to the football team Huragan Pobiedziska.

== Notable residents ==
- Michał Kozal (1893–1943), Polish Roman Catholic bishop, murdered by the Germans in the Dachau concentration camp, served as a vicar in Pobiedziska in 1918–1920.
- Andrzej Pieczyński (born 1956), actor
- Antoni Palluth (1900-1944), cryptographer and engineer
- Antoni Świadek (1909-1945), priest and martyr
- Jarosław Molenda (born 1965), writer
- Wacław Strażewicz (born 1952), politician
- Willy Kaiser (1912–1986), German boxer, Olympic Gold medal 1936
