= Janusz Bieniak =

Polish medievalist (1927–2025)

- Born: 1 October 1927; Warsaw
- Died: 28 July 2025 (aged 97)
- Occupation: Historian

Janusz Bieniak (1 October 1927 – 28 July 2025) was a medievalist.

== Biography ==
Born in Warsaw, into a family with landed gentry traditions. In 1946 he passed matura in the Stefan Żeromski High School in Toruń. From 1947 to 1951 he studied history at the Nicolaus Copernicus University in Toruń, and graduated under the supervision of Bronisław Włodarski. During his studies he attended lectures by Henryk Elzenberg.

In the years 1949–1958 he worked alternately at the Redemptorist Minor Seminary, as a history teacher, and at the District Museum in Toruń. In March 1958 he started working at the Nicolaus Copernicus University. In 1960 he obtained doctorate. In 1968 he obtained habilitation. From 1986 until 1998 he was the head of the Department of Auxiliary Sciences of History at the Institute of History and Archival Sciences of the Nicolaus Copernicus University.

He published several biographies in the Polish Biographical Dictionary. He was supervisor in eight doctoral dissertations. He was a member of Towarzystwo Naukowe w Toruniu, Polish Historical Society and Polish Heraldry Society. He was a member of the Consultative Council to the Chairman of the State Council.

== Works ==
- Państwo Miecława: studium analityczne. Warszawa. 1963.
- Wielkopolska, Kujawy, ziemie łęczycka i sieradzka wobec problemu zjednoczenia państwowego w latach 1300–1306. 1969.
- Urzędnicy łęczyccy, sieradzcy i wieluńscy XIII–XV wieku: spisy. Wrocław. 1985.
- Polskie rycerstwo średniowieczne: wybór pism. Kraków. 2002.
- Polskie rycerstwo średniowieczne: suplement. Kraków. 2005.
- Najstarsze kujawskie księgi ziemskie (1397–1408): kolejność i chronologia kart. Warszawa. 2007.

=== Editions ===
- Formowanie się społeczeństwa stanowego. Toruń. 1974.

== Accolades ==
- Medal of the 10th Anniversary of People's Poland (1955)
- Officer's Cross of the Order of Polonia Restituta (1998)

== Bibliography ==
- Kto jest kim w Polsce 1989. Warszawa: Wydawnictwo Interpress. 1989. p. 89.
