= Milsko, Lubusz Voivodeship =

Milsko
- Village
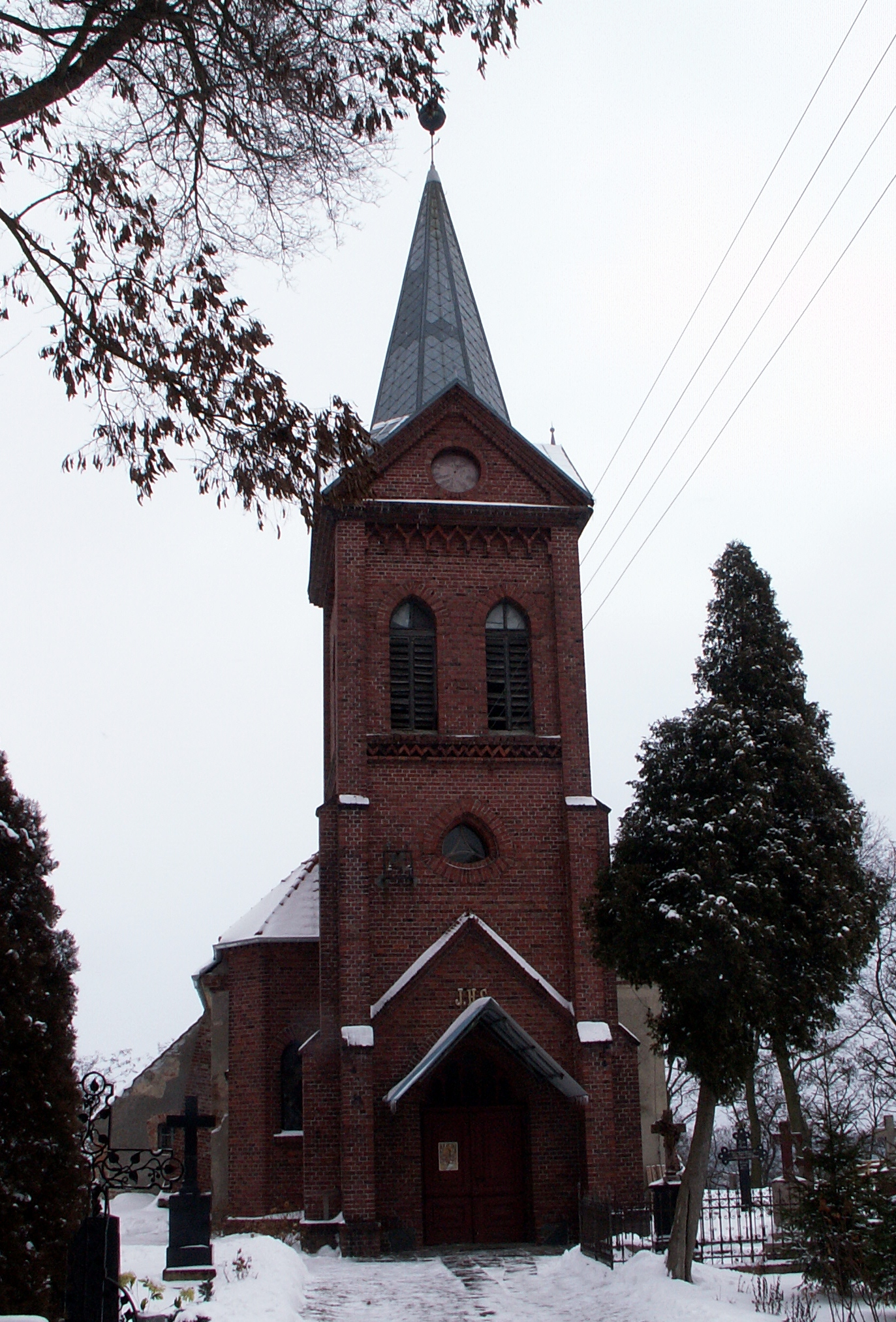
- Catholic church

- Location within Poland
- Coordinates: 51°56′N 15°46′E
- Country: Poland
- Voivodeship: Lubusz
- County: Zielona Góra
- Gmina: Zabór

Milsko [ˈmilskɔ] (German: Milzig) is a village in the administrative district of Gmina Zabór, within Zielona Góra County, Lubusz Voivodeship, in western Poland. Its former name was "Milzig" and was part of Landkreis Grünberg in Regierungsbezirk Liegnitz of Province of Silesia and in Province of Lower Silesia in Germany before 1945. In year 1002, a settlement in the Kingdom of Poland under Boleslaus the Brave (pl. Chrobry), uknowledged by Henry II in Merseburg.
