= Casimir I the Restorer =

Duke of Poland
- Reign: 1040 – 1058
- Predecessor: Mieszko II Lambert or Bolesław the Forgotten (disputed)
- Successor: Bolesław II the Bold
- Born: 25 July 1016; Kraków, Poland
- Died: 19 March 1058 (aged 41); Poznań, Poland
- Burial: Archcathedral Basilica of St. Peter and St. Paul, Poznań
- Wife: Maria Dobroniega of Kiev
- Issue more...: Bolesław II the Bold; Władysław I Herman; Mieszko; Świętosława
- Dynasty: Piast dynasty
- Father: Mieszko II Lambert
- Mother: Richeza of Lotharingia

Casimir I the Restorer (Polish: Kazimierz I Odnowiciel; 25 July 1016 – 19 March 1058), a member of the Piast dynasty, was the duke of Poland from 1040 until his death. Casimir was the son of Mieszko II Lambert and Richeza of Lotharingia. He is known as the Restorer because he managed to reunite parts of the Kingdom of Poland after a period of turmoil. He reintegrated Masovia, Silesia and Pomerania. However, he failed to crown himself King of Poland, mainly because of internal and external threats to his rule.

== Biography ==
=== Early years ===
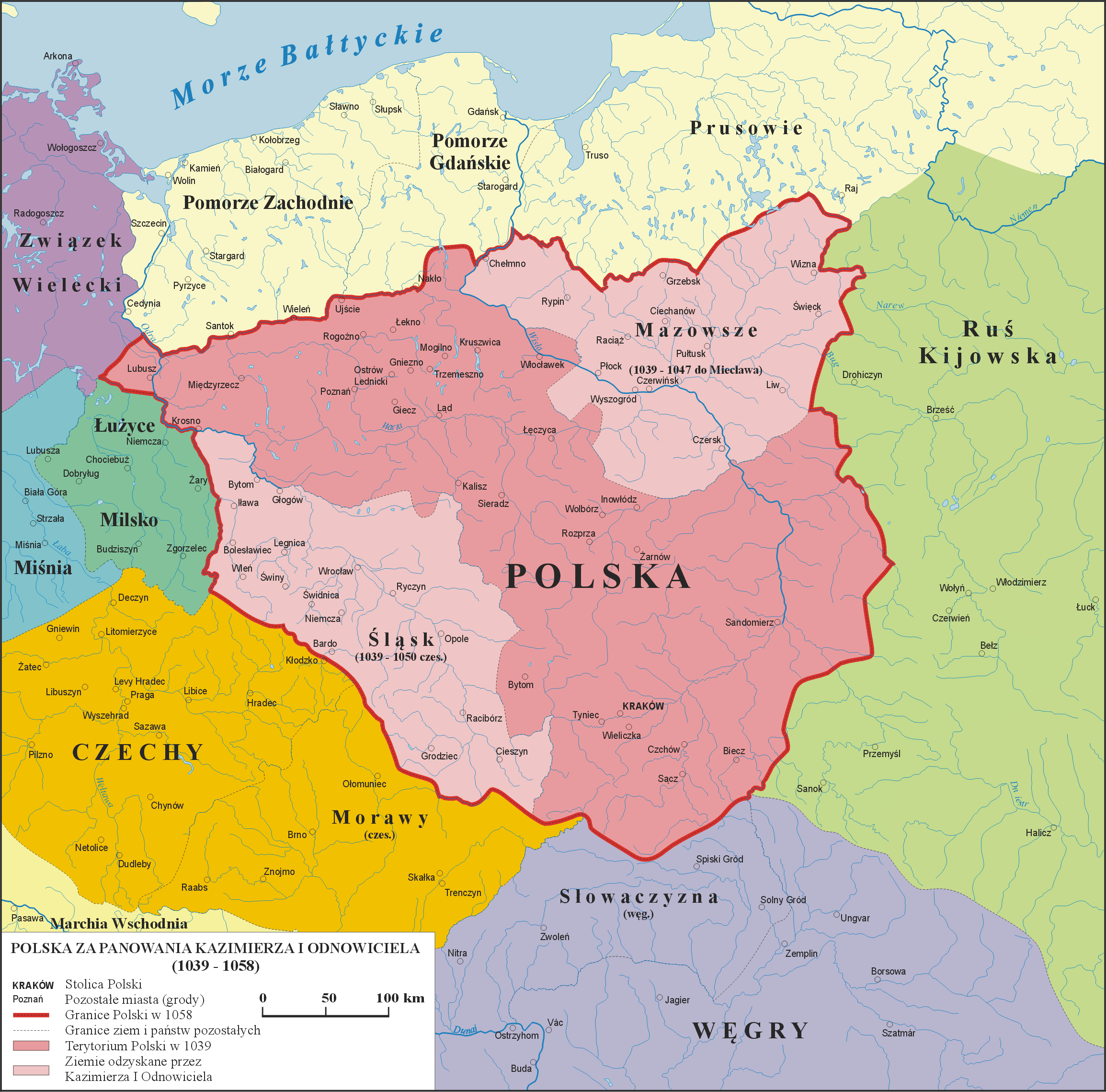
Poland during the reign of Casimir I (1039/1040–1058)

Relatively little is known of Casimir's early life. He must have spent his childhood at the royal court of Poland in Gniezno. In order to acquire a proper education, he was sent to one of the Polish monasteries in 1026. According to some older sources, he initially wanted to have a career in the Church (it is probable that he held the post of oblate) and even asked for a dispensation to become a monk. This hypothesis, however, is not supported by modern historians. Regardless, he left church work indefinitely in 1031.

Casimir's father, Mieszko II Lambert, was crowned King of Poland in 1025 after the death of his father, Bolesław the Brave. However, the powerful magnates of the country feared a strong central government like the one that existed under Bolesław I's rule. This led to considerable friction between the King and the nobility. Taking advantage of the King's precarious situation, Mieszko II's older half-brother Bezprym and younger brother Otto turned against him and allied themselves with the Holy Roman Emperor Conrad II, whose forces attacked Poland and regained Lusatia. Years of chaos and conflict followed, during which Mieszko II was forced to cede the throne to Bezprym in 1031, fled to Bohemia, was imprisoned by Duke Oldřich and castrated, returned to rule a portion of the kingdom, eventually regained the kingdom, and then died in May 1034 under suspicious circumstances.

Sometime during the reign of Bezprym, Casimir and his sisters were taken by their mother to Germany (her native land) for refuge. It has been reported that Queen Richeza brought the Polish royal crown and regalia to Emperor Conrad II at Bezprym's request to indicate his acceptance of the primacy of his western neighbour, although the Queen could have taken them for safekeeping, or they could have been brought to the Emperor by another means. At the time of his father's death in 1034, Casimir was about 18 years old and in Germany at the court of his uncle, the Archbishop Hermann II of Cologne.

=== Bolesław I ===
The central district of Greater Poland (Wielkopolska) revolted against the nobles and Catholic clergy en masse. A pagan revival in the area lasted for several years. The district of Masovia seceded and a local lord, Miecław, formed a state of his own. A similar situation occurred in Pomerania.

In 1037, both the young prince and his mother returned to Poland and attempted to seize the throne. This precipitated a rebellion by local barons, which, coupled with the so-called "Pagan Reaction" of the commoners, forced Casimir and Richeza to flee to Saxony. However, soon Casimir returned to Poland and in 1038, once again, tried to regain power with the aid of his influential mother. This also failed and he had to flee again, this time to the Kingdom of Hungary, where he was imprisoned by Stephen I. Richeza remained in Germany as a nun until her death in 1063.

Taking advantage of the chaos and his neighbour's weakness, Duke Bretislaus I of Bohemia invaded and ravaged the country in 1039. Lesser and Greater Poland were severely pillaged, Poznań was captured, and Bretislaus sacked Gniezno, taking the relics of Saint Adalbert, Radim Gaudentius, and the five hermit brothers with him. On the way back, he conquered part of Silesia, including Wrocław, destroyed religious buildings which were built by Mieszko I during the feast of the conversion of Poland, and plundered Mieszko I's tomb.

=== Restoration ===
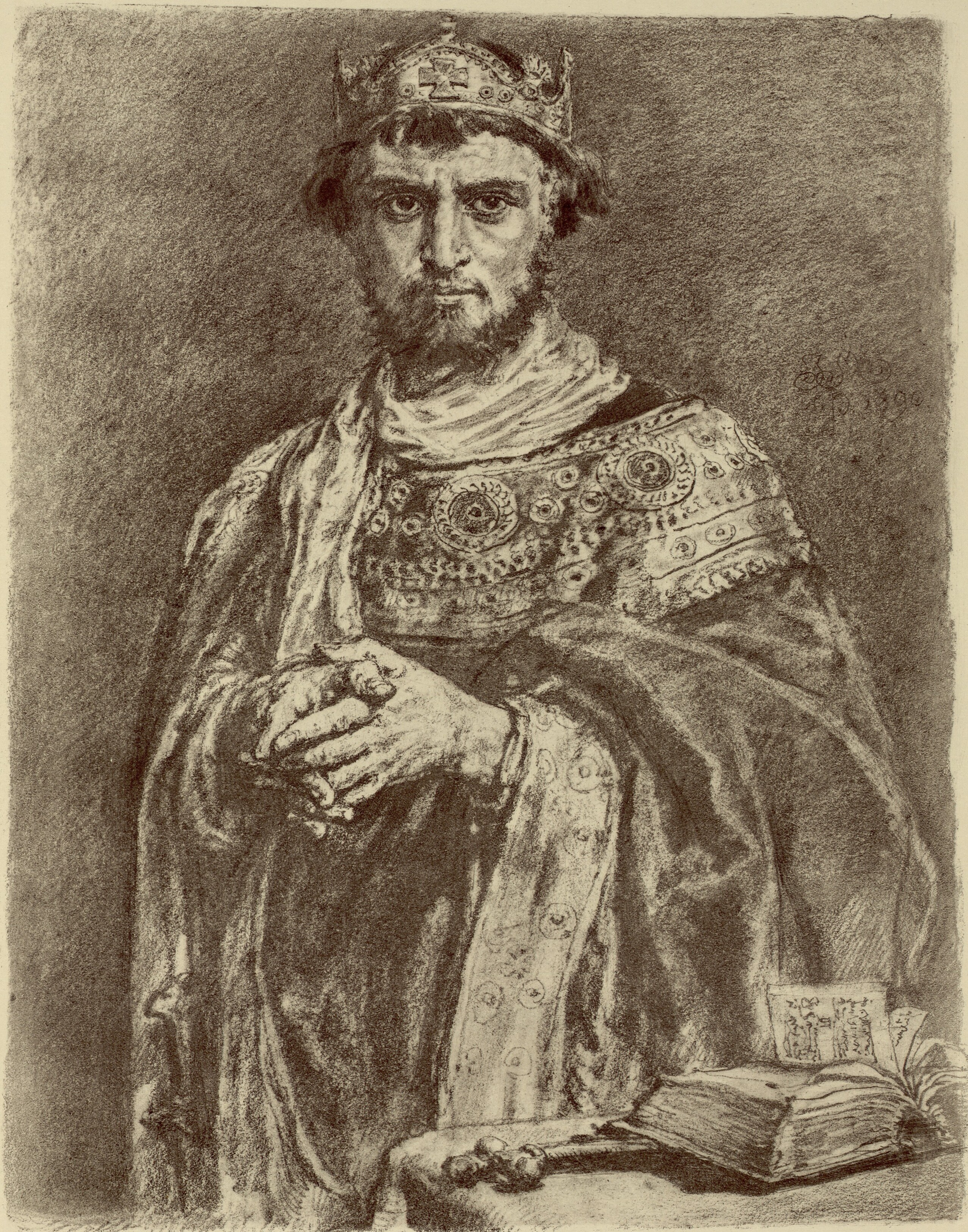
Imaginary 19th century depiction of Casimir I by Jan Matejko

After initially escaping to Hungary, Casimir went to Germany, where in 1039 his relative Emperor Henry III (who feared the increased power of the Bohemian ruler) gave him military and financial support. Casimir received a force of 1,000 heavy footmen and a significant amount of gold to restore his power in Poland. Casimir also signed an alliance with Yaroslav I the Wise, the Prince of Kievan Rus', who was linked with him through Casimir's marriage with Yaroslav's sister, Maria Dobroniega of Kiev. With this support, Casimir returned to Poland and managed to retake most of his domain. In 1041, Bretislaus, defeated in his second attempted invasion by Emperor Henry III, signed a treaty at Regensburg (1042) in which he renounced his claims to all Polish lands except for Silesia, which was to be incorporated into the Bohemian Kingdom. It was Casimir's success in strengthening royal power and ending internal strife that earned him the epithet of "the Restorer".

The treaty gained Casimir a period of peace on the southern border and the capital of Poland was moved to Kraków, the only major Polish city untouched by the wars. It is probable that the Holy Roman Emperor was pleased with the balance of power that had been restored to the region and forced Casimir not to crown himself the King of Poland. In 1046, Emperor Henry III held royal and imperial courts at Merseburg and Meissen, at which he ended the strife among the Duke of Pomerania (Dux Bomeraniorum), Duke Bretislaus of Bohemia, and Casimir I.

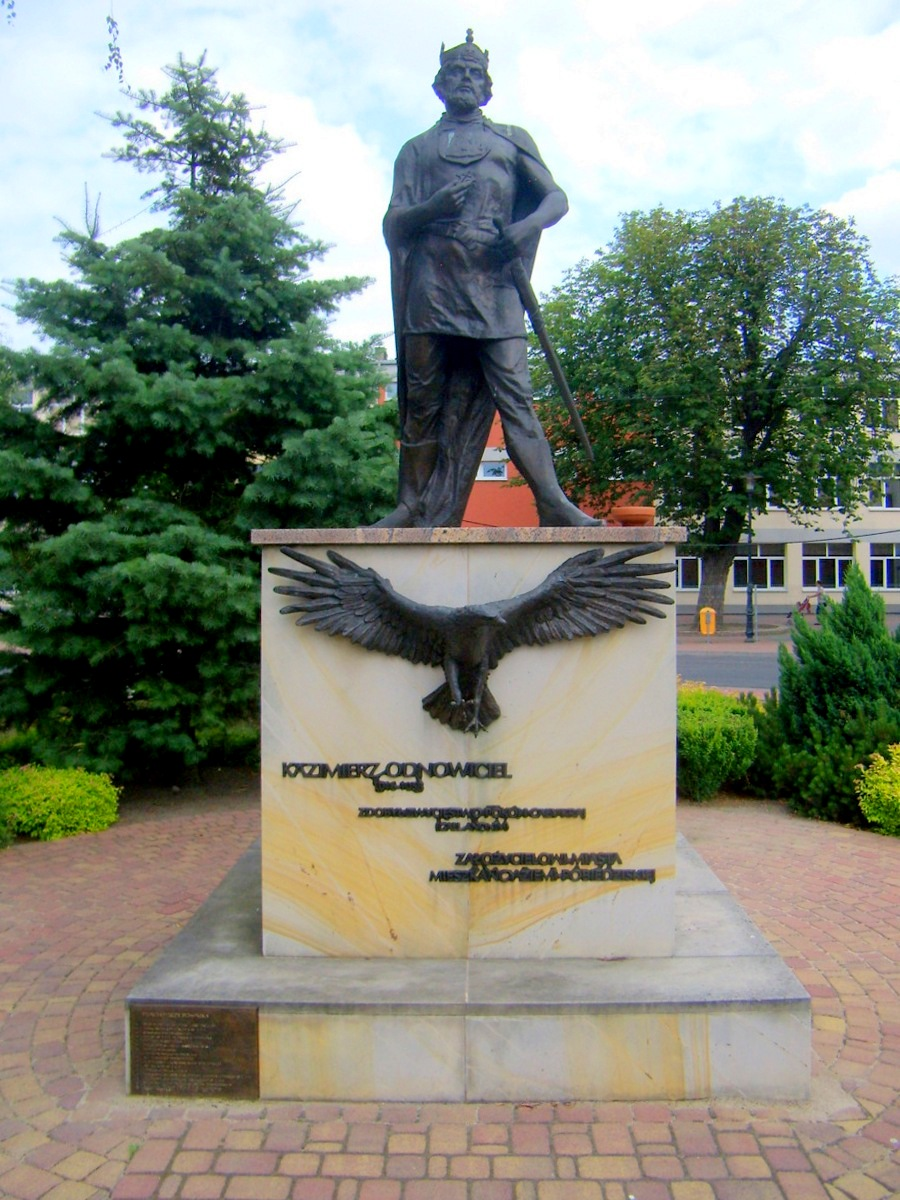
Monument of Casimir I the Restorer in Pobiedziska

In 1047, Casimir, aided by his Kievan brother-in-law, started a war against Masovia and seized the land. It is probable that he also defeated Miecław's allies from Pomerania and re-attached Gdańsk to Poland. This secured his power in central Poland. Three years later, against the will of the Emperor, Casimir seized Bohemian-controlled Silesia, thus securing most of his father's domain. In 1054 in Quedlinburg, the Emperor ruled that Silesia was to remain in Poland in exchange for a yearly tribute of 117 kg of silver and 7 kg of gold.

At that time, Casimir was focused on internal matters. To strengthen his rule, he re-created the bishoprics in Kraków and Wrocław and erected the new Wawel Cathedral. During Casimir's rule, heraldry was introduced into Poland and, unlike his predecessors, he promoted the landed gentry over the drużyna as his base of power. One of his reforms was the introduction, to Poland, of a key element of feudalism: the granting of fiefdoms to his retinue of warriors, thus gradually transforming them into medieval knights.

== Marriage and issue ==
Casimir married Maria Dobroniega (c. 1012–1087), daughter of Grand Duke Vladimir I of Kiev. There is no consensus among historians as to when it took place. Władymir D. Koroliuk said that it was in 1039, Aleksej A. Szachmatow and Iwan Linniczenko agreed on 1041, while Dymitr S. Lichaczew postulated that it occurred during 1043.

Casimir and Maria had five children:

1. Bolesław II the Bold (c. 1043 – 2/3 April 1081/1082)
2. Władysław I Herman (c. 1044 – 4 June 1102)
3. Mieszko (16 April 1045 – 28 January 1065)
4. Otto (c. 1046 – 1048).
5. Świętosława (c. 1048 – 1 September 1126), married c. 1062 to Duke (from 1085, King) Vratislaus II of Bohemia

== See also ==
- History of Poland (966–1385)
- Masław

== Bibliography ==
- Davies, Norman (1982). God's Playground: A History of Poland. Vol. I: The Origins to 1795. Columbia University Press.

Casimir I the Restorer Piast Dynasty Born: 25 July 1016 Died: 19 March 1058
Preceded by Mieszko Lambert	Duke of Poland; 1040 – 1058	Succeeded by Bolesław the Bold
