= Wincenty Kadłubek =

Polish bishop (c. 1150 – 8 March 1223)

Blessed Wincenty Kadłubek O.Cist.
- Bishop Emeritus of Kraków
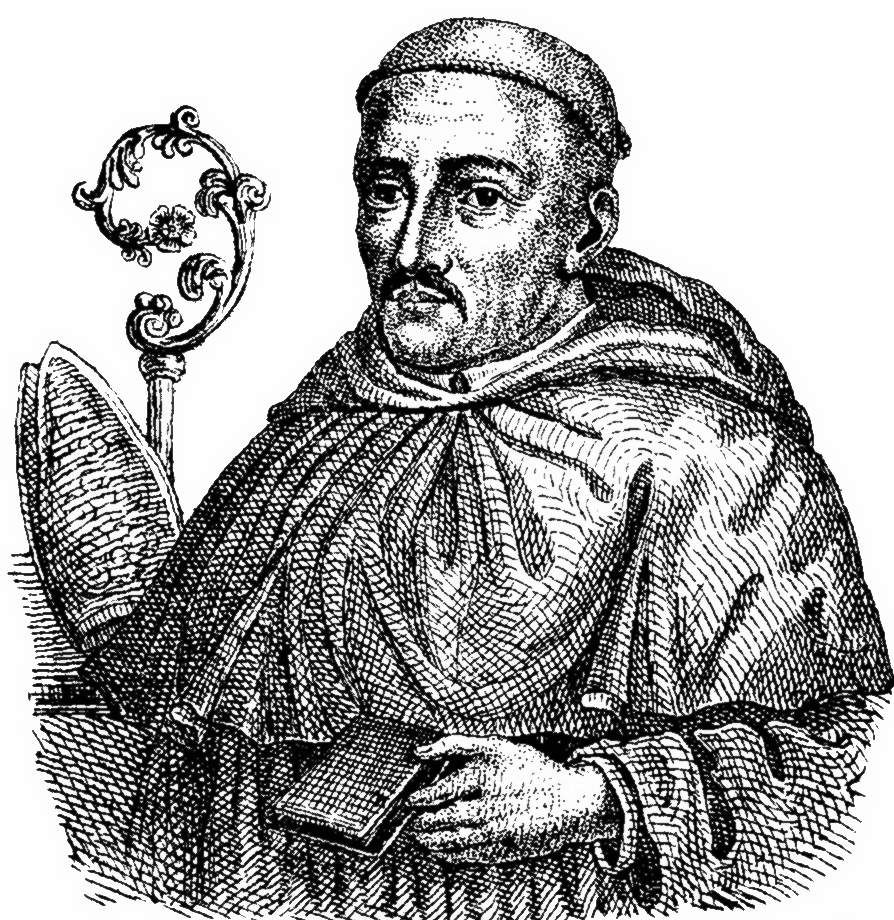
- Church: Roman Catholic Church
- Diocese: Kraków
- See: Kraków
- Appointed: 28 March 1208
- Term ended: 1218
- Predecessor: Fułko
- Successor: Iwo Odrowąż

Orders
- Consecration: May 1208 by Henryk Kietlicz

Personal details
- Born: Wincenty Kadłubek c. 1150 Karwów, Kingdom of Poland
- Died: 23 March 1223 Jędrzejów, Kingdom of Poland
- Education: University of Paris; University of Bologna

Sainthood
- Feast day: 8 March
- Venerated in: Roman Catholic Church
- Beatified: 18 February 1764; Saint Peter's Basilica, Papal States by Pope Clement XIII
- Attributes: Episcopal attire; Cistercian habit
- Patronage: Sandomierz; Writers; Diocese of Kielce; Jędrzejów

Wincenty Kadłubek (Latin: Vincentius Cadlubkonis; c. 1150 – 8 March 1223) was a Polish Catholic prelate and professed Cistercian who served as the Bishop of Kraków from 1208 until his resignation in 1218. His episcopal mission was to reform the diocesan priests to ensure their holiness and invigorate the faithful and cultivate greater participation in ecclesial affairs on their part. Wincenty was more than just a bishop; he was a leading scholar in Poland and the author of Chronica Polonorum. He was also a lawyer, historian, church reformer, monk, magister, and is considered by some to be the father of Polish culture and national identity.

The process of his canonization proved quite slow despite the initial momentum to see him proclaimed as a saint. The cause languished for several centuries until 1764 when Pope Clement XIII beatified him.

== Early life and education ==
Little is known about Kadłubek's early life, but we do know he was born around 1160 to parents of elite status. Eleventh and twelfth century Poland was a complicated and turbulent place, shaping Kadłubek's works and life. This period of time is characterized by territorial divisions between branches of the Piast dynasty and civil war.

Kadłubek first studied in Stopnica before he studied at the cathedral school in Kraków. It was while at the latter that he studied under Mateusz Cholewa, who encouraged Kadłubek to be sent abroad for further studies. He completed his studies in 1185 and returned home where he was ordained to the priesthood before 1189 and served as the provost for the Sandomierz Cathedral; some sources suggest that he served as the principal of the cathedral school in Kraków. He studied in France at the university of Paris as well as at the university of Bologna. Some sources suggest that he met the future Pope Innocent III at Bologna when the two were students and it was further said he once encountered John of Salisbury.

Kadłubek was considerably educated for the time period. He was knowledgeable of medieval and classical literature, spoke Greek, French, and Latin, and had a meticulous knowledge of Roman and Canon law. At the time, you could only learn about Roman and Canon law at schools in Paris and Bologna. He was the first known Polish lawyer to contribute to Polish legal scholarship. Kadłubek's Chronica Polonorum (Chronicle of Poles) confirms he was a lawyer. Through this chronicle, he was the first Polish person to chronicle Polish history, making him a cardinal source for the early medieval history of Poland.

== Time as a bishop ==
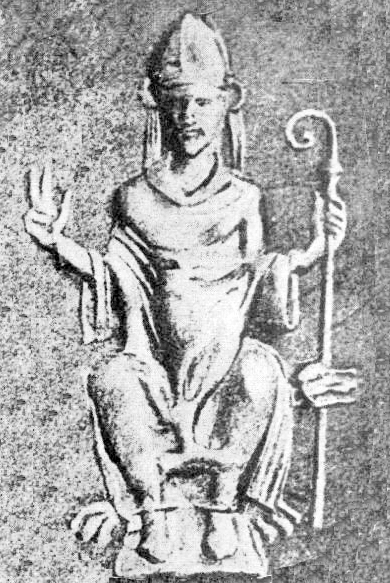
Depiction of Kadłubek on a seal from 1210

Kadłubek was elected to be a bishop in 1208. It was after the death of Fulko - the Bishop of Kraków - that he was chosen to succeed him as the new bishop. This was the first time that the Krakow Chapter elected a bishop on its own, with the help of Pope Innocent III, instead of through secular power. Pope Innocent III had to take action because the Krakow Chapter could not decide between Kadłubek and Bishop Gedko of Plok. Kadłubek was eventually chosen to be a bishop because of his avid support of church reforms and potential friendship with Pope Innocent III, as It is possible that Pope Innocent III and Kadłubek met in Paris while studying. Pope Innocent III confirmed the decision in a papal bull on 28 March 1208 and Kadłubek received his episcopal consecration from the Archbishop of Gniezno two months later. Innocent III's bull referred to Kadłubek's wisdom as the motivation for his selection while referring to him as a "master and preacher".

He set out to reform the diocesan priesthood to ensure their holiness while also seeking to invigorate the faithful to active participation in ecclesial affairs. As Bishop, he took action to make sure the church was independent of the power of the duke. In addition to being the bishop, he was the legislator of the diocese in Krakow and a member of the first Polish delegation to the Fourth Lateran Council, causing him to affect their reforms and resolutions in Krakow. He participated in diocesan synods and donated to the diocese of Krakow. He also founded and donated to monasteries, in addition to being a benefactor of the Cistercian monastery in Jędrzejów, which was not uncommon for bishops at the time. He was the first in Poland to begin the custom of lighting a vigil lamp prior to the Blessed Sacrament, which he was able to accomplish by allocating funds from the Krakow Chapter to provide wax for the vigil lamp in Saint Wenceslas Cathedral. He also consecrated Saint Florian's Basilica and was said to have once been the chaplain to Casimir II the Just. Kadłubek was ordained as a priest the Dominican friar Ceslaus.

The bishop was noted for his linguistic skills and his charismatic preaching; Kadłubek was known also for his expertise in canon law, his approach to philosophical subjects, as well as for his expertise in rhetoric. He was well educated in the natural sciences since he had learned about them while in Paris and Bologna. Yet, it was while in Europe that he started reading into the life and works of Saint Bernard of Clairvaux and became enthralled with the charism of the Cistercians whom he granted favors to as bishop.

He followed Gallus Anonymus in further developing the idea of the Latin proverb "vox populi vox dei" ("the voice of the people is the voice of God") and argued that the ruler (king) should follow a council that includes bishops and representatives of clans since not the ruler but the council has higher power originating from the laws that God instituted. He also claimed that the council should elect the ruler and that rulers abusing their power should be removed from their position.

== Later life ==
In 1217, Kadłubek decided to resign from his duties as a bishop. He spent his last years at the Cistercian monastery in Jędrzejów, making him the first Bishop of Krakow to join the Cistercian order after voluntarily abdicating. This also made him the first Polish person in the Cistercian monastery in Jędrzejów, which was composed of exclusively French monks at the time. The fire at the Jędrzejów monastery in 1800 in combination with the turbulence of Polish history at the time makes it difficult to understand the remaining years of his life. He likely continued to write the Chronica Polonorum into this time.

Kadlubek died on 8 March 1223, retaining his bishop's pallium, buried in the Jędrzejów monastery, his remains were interred before the high altar of the convent church. His remains were exhumed on 26 April 1633 with his pallium found intact though his remains had become skeletal. Measurements were taken and it was surmised that he was of "fair height". His remains were moved to a new location before the high altar on the following 16 August. Kadłubek's remains were again exhumed and reinterred in mid-1765 and some were moved to Sandomierz in 1845 for veneration. Other parts to his remains were moved in 1903 to Wawel and placed in a silver urn.

== Beatification ==
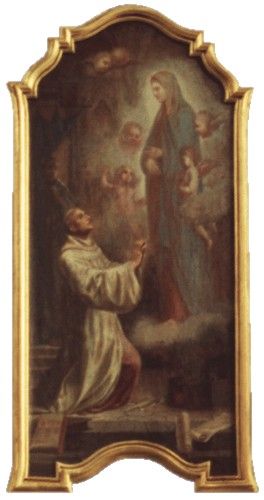
Painting in the Sandomierz Cathedral.

In 1634 the Polish episcopate made a petition to Pope Urban VIII requesting his canonization. In 1650 the Bishop of Kraków Piotr Gembicki appointed a tribunal to hear witnesses for the cause but the commission never began its work which suspended the cause. Bishop Jan Małachowski - in 1683 - petitioned Pope Innocent XI to canonize the late bishop. Innocent XI requested the Congregation for Rites to begin an investigation which took place from 1688 to 1692. But the congregation concluded that there was no reliable evidence to prove his heroic virtue which suspended the cause once again. In 1682 the king Jan III Sobieski petitioned for his beatification. The Order of Cîteaux made similar request in 1699 at their General Chapter. The Polish episcopate made another request to Pope Clement XII to canonize him but the process that the pope requested came to the same conclusion as the previous one.

In 1761 the king Augustus III sent two letters to Pope Clement XIII requesting the canonization which prompted the pope to order another process of investigation. That investigation proved to be successful for Clement XIII issued a papal bull in which he beatified the late bishop on 18 February 1764. On 9 June 1764 the pope issued another bull that allowed for a Mass and the Divine Office to be said in his honor in Kraków and among the Cistercians.

He is referred to in Poland as a saint despite the fact that he has not been canonized as such; Cardinal Stanisław Dziwisz referred to Kadłubek as a "saint" in 2008. Since 2 January 2016 he has been the patron for Jędrzejów.

=== Efforts to resume the cause ===
There had been several efforts since his beatification to resume the cause and achieve his canonization though each attempt failed. Cardinal Stefan Wyszyński and Karol Józef Wojtyła (the future Pope John Paul II) both supported his cause in 1964 with Wojtyła referring to the late bishop as the "Father of Polish culture".

In 1972 the Congregation for the Causes of Saints concluded that there was no reliable or available documentation that could confirm Kadłubek's heroic virtues thus suspending the cause which has not continued since.

== Works ==
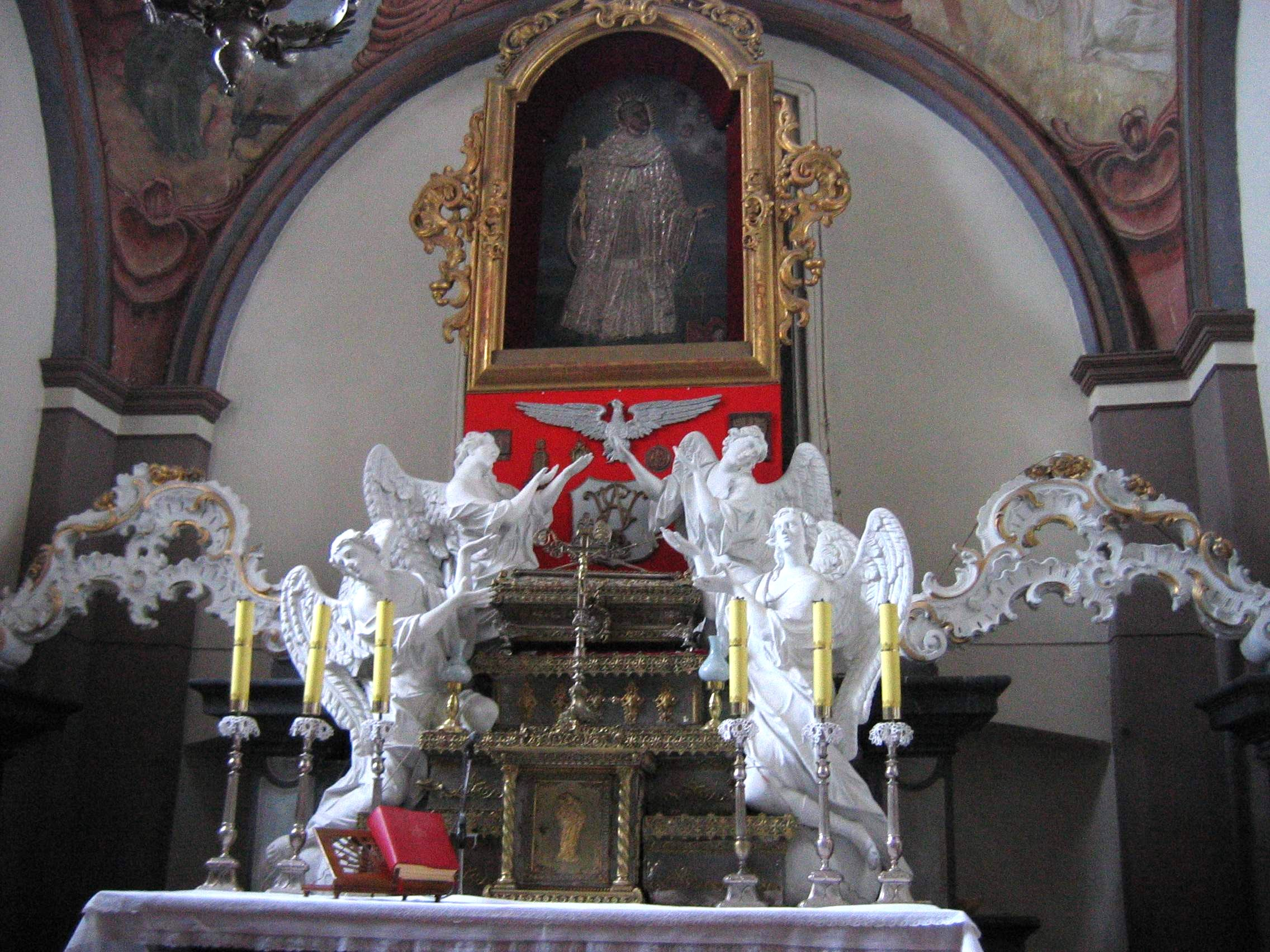
Relics in Jędrzejów.

His best-known work - Chronica seu originale regum et principum Poloniae (Chronicles of the Kings and Princes of Poland) - is a historical compendium of Poland in four volumes. The first three volumes take the form of a dialogue between Archbishop John of Gniezno and Bishop Mateusz. The first volume's sources are legends while the second is based on the chronicle of Gallus and the last two are based upon Kadłubek's own experiences. Writing this work made him the first Polish native to chronicle Polish history.

This work had a huge impact on the Polish political doctrine of the 14th and 15th centuries co-authored by Stanisław of Skarbimierz as well as on later works of Wawrzyniec Grzymała Goślicki. These ideas led to the Nobles' Democracy in Poland for it is in his works that for the first time the terms res publica (see Commonwealth and Rzeczpospolita) were used in the context of Poland. Some suggest that the book was written at the request of Prince Casimir II; others suggest that it was made at the request of Prince Leszek while Kadłubek was a bishop; still others claim that it was not written until after his retirement.

Catholic Church titles
Preceded by Fulko	Bishop of Kraków; 28 March 1208–1218	Succeeded by Iwo Odrowąż
