= Gallus Anonymus =

12th-century chronicler of Polish history

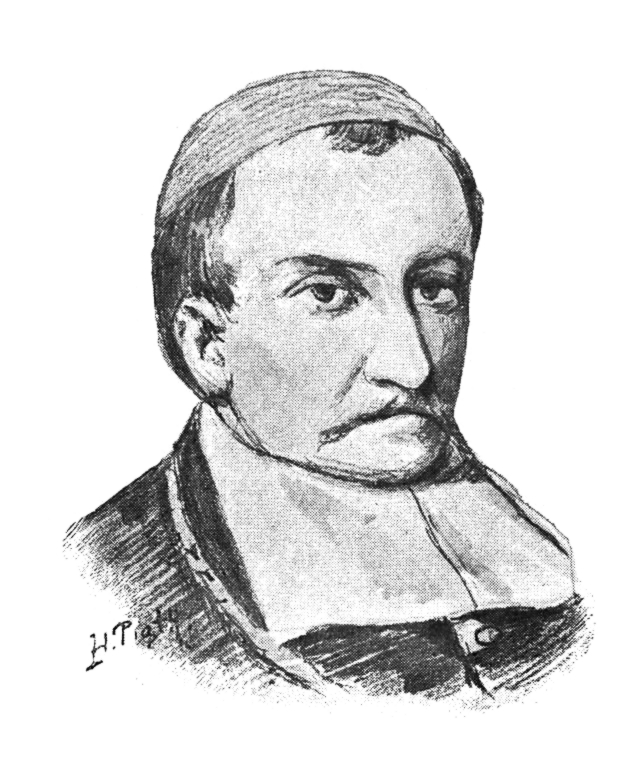
An artist's impression of Gallus Anonymus' portrait by Henryk Piątkowski], 1898.

Gallus Anonymus (Polish: Gall Anonim, Anonim, tak zwany Gall), is the name traditionally given to the anonymous author of Gesta principum Polonorum (Deeds of the Princes of the Poles), composed in Latin between 1112 and 1118. Gallus is generally regarded as the first historian to have described the history of Poland. His Chronicles are an obligatory text for university courses in Polish history. Very little is known of the author himself and it is widely believed that he was a foreigner.

== Kromer ==
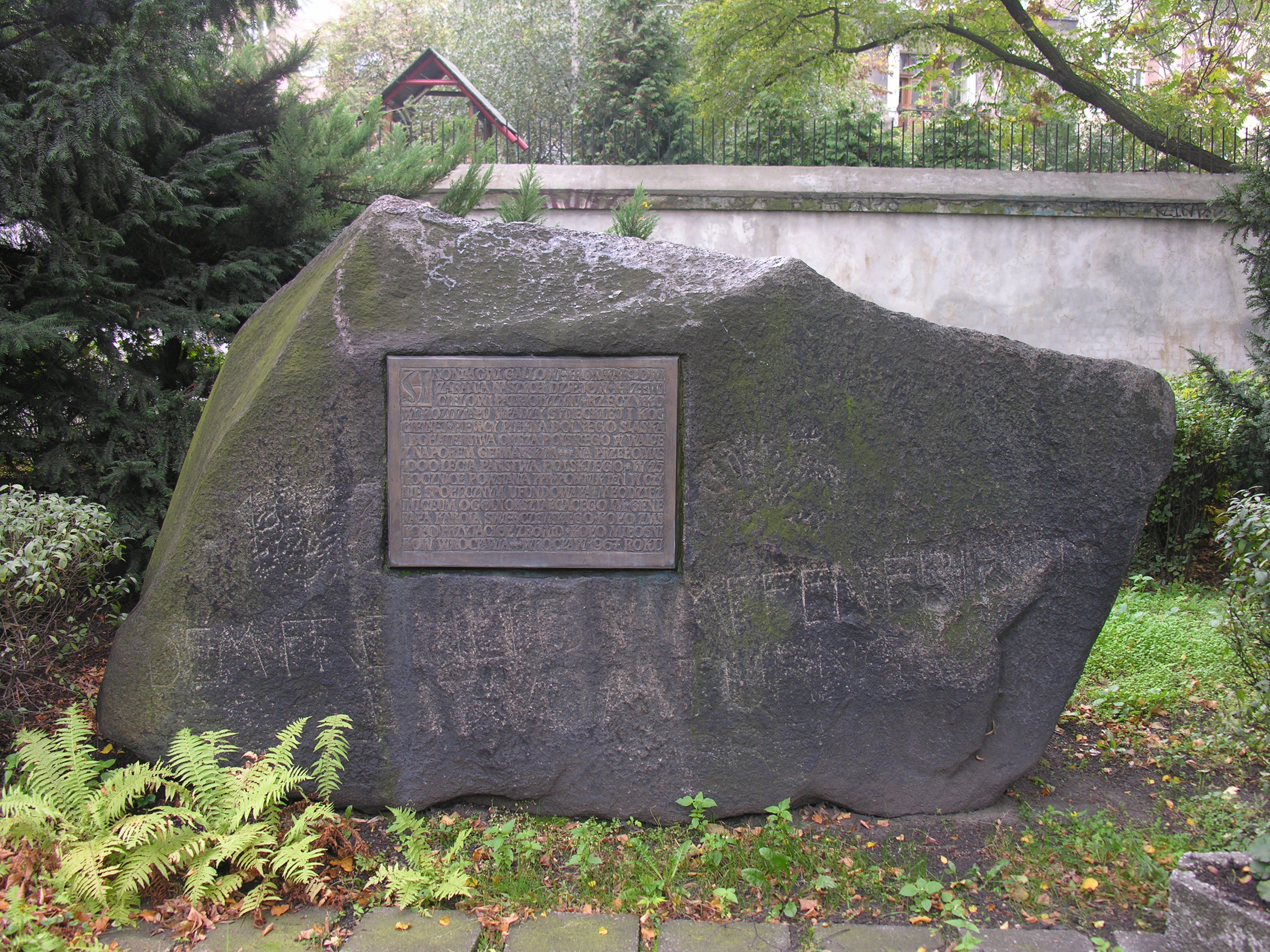
Monument to Gall Anonim, Wrocław, Poland

The only source for Gallus' real name is a note made by Prince-Bishop of Warmia Marcin Kromer (1512–89) in the margin of folio 119 of the "Heilsberg manuscript." It reads: Gallus hanc historiam scripsit, monachus, opinor, aliquis, ut ex proemiis coniicere licet qui Boleslai tertii tempore vixit (Gallus wrote this history, some monk, in my opinion, who lived in the time of Boleslaus III Wrymouth, as can be conjectured from the preface.') It is not known whether Kromer intended the word "Gallus" as a proper name or as a reference to the author's nationality (Gallus in this period normally means "a Frenchman"), nor what he based his identification on.

The Heilsberg manuscript, one of three extant witnesses of the Gesta, was written between 1469 and 1471. From the mid-16th to 18th centuries, it was kept in the town of Heilsberg (today Lidzbark Warmiński, Poland). It was later published at the behest of Prince-Bishop of Warmia Adam Stanisław Grabowski (1698–1766).

== Origin ==
The author of the Gesta wrote little about himself and was not written about in contemporary sources. What Gallus did write about himself may be summed up as follows: Before going to Poland, he likely spent some time in Hungary, where he met Polish duke Boleslaus III Wrymouth; he was a pilgrim; he revered Saint Giles; and he knew little about Scandinavia.

Historians agree that Gallus' writing style indicates a substantial education, available only to nobles and monks; and that he was an experienced writer, thus likely also to have authored earlier works. The clericus de penna vivens ("cleric living by his pen") is suspected by Danuta Borawska and Marian Plezia to have earlier penned the Gesta Hungarorum (Deeds of the Hungarians) and the Translatio Sancti Nicolai (The Transfer of St. Nicholas); and his writing style is thought to have been influenced by recent literary developments that were then common only in northern France and the Netherlands.

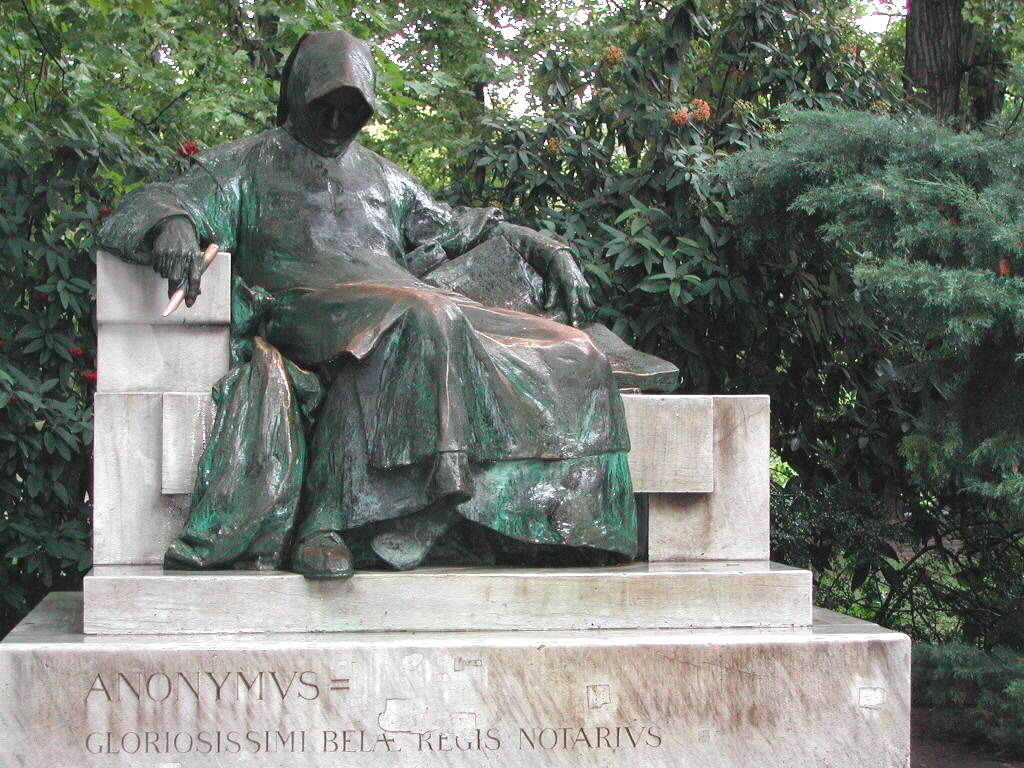
Statue, in Budapest's Vajdahunyad Castle, of Anonymus, author of The Deeds of the Hungarians and possibly of Gesta principum Polonorum. Sculptor: Miklós Ligeti

Budapest's Vajdahunyad Castle features an evocative bronze statue of a seated Anonymus in monk's habit, the cowl obscuring his face.

Gallus' place of origin is unknown. Several theories have been advanced. Traditional scholarship has assumed that he was French (hence Gallus), perhaps from France or Flanders. Plezia has suggested that he was a monk from Saint Giles' Monastery in Provence, France.

Some scholars have pointed out that Gallus' writing style resembles that of Hildebert of Lavardin and have thought that Gallus had been educated at Le Mans or, according to Zathey, at Chartres or Bec in Normandy.

Before World War II, French historian Pierre David advanced a theory that Gallus might have been a Hungarian monk from Saint Giles' Monastery in Somogyvár who accompanied Boleslaus in his return from Hungary to Poland. This theory enjoys little support.

Another theory has been gaining ground in Poland. Professors Danuta Borawska and Tomasz Jasiński of Poznań University have presented a case for a Venetian origin. It has been argued that Gallus may have been a monk from St. Giles' Monastery at the Lido, Venice, Italy, and Professor Plezia has subsequently concurred.

The Venetian theory was first broached in 1904 by Polish historian Tadeusz Wojciechowski. In 1965 it was proposed again by Borawska but did not win acceptance. In recent years, however, it has been revisited and has now gained positive reviews from several Polish medievalists. It has been supported by Professors Janusz Bieniak, Roman Michałowski and Wojciech Fałkowski. Fałkowski has noted that the two theories—French and Italian—may be less mutually exclusive than some think, as Gallus might have been born in Italy, been a monk at the Lido, and have later traveled to France and Hungary.

According to Tomasz Jasiński, who in 2008 published a book on Gallus, the chronicler came to Poland over the Via Egnatia across the Slavic-speaking countries of "Epirus, Thrace, Dalmatia, Croatia, Istria." When Jasiński compared the Chronicle with the Transfer of St. Nicholas, he found over 100 similarities. Jasiński has concluded that Gallus, like many Venetian clergymen of the time, had a native knowledge of both Italian and Slavic languages.

However, Paul W. Knoll and Frank Schaer regard the Venetian suggestion as "too weak to be considered seriously." In Poland, medievalist Professor Jacek Banaszkiewicz supports a French over an Italian origin for Gallus Anonymus.

== Influence ==
The anonymous author of the Gesta influenced the subsequent course of Poland's history, in that his version of early Polish history held the ruler's authority to be inferior to that of God, a principle expressed by the voice of the people (as in the Latin proverb, "Vox populi, vox Dei").

This concept reinforced Poles' electoral traditions and their tendency to disobey and question authority. Via the Chronicles of Wincenty Kadłubek and the Sermons of Stanisław of Skarbimierz, it contributed to the development of the unique "Golden Liberty" that would characterize the Polish–Lithuanian Commonwealth, whose kings were elected and were obliged to obey the Sejm (parliament).

== See also ==
- Anonymus (notary of Béla III)
- Gesta Hungarorum
