= Chronica seu originale regum et principum Poloniae =

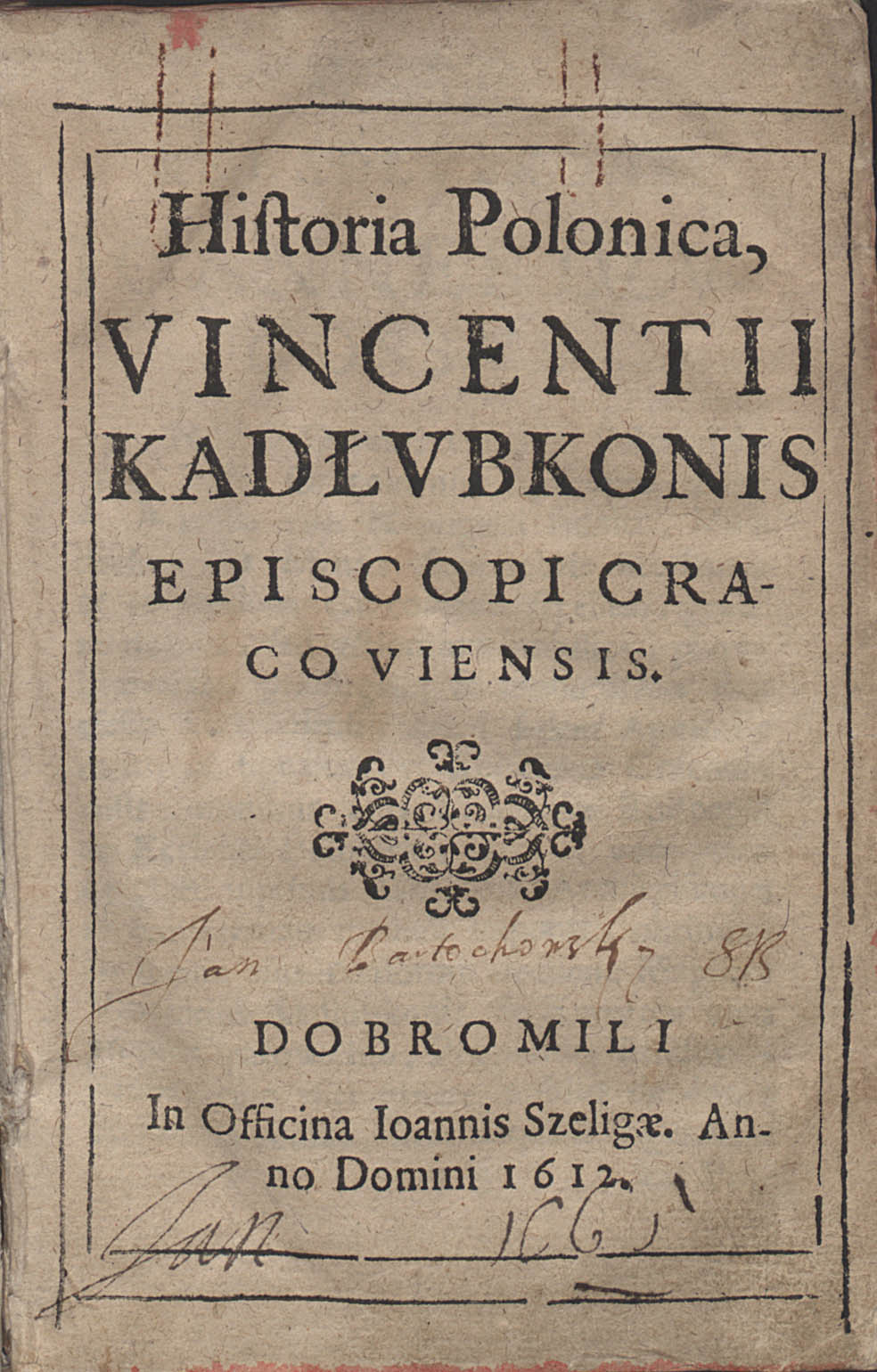
Historia Polonica, Vincenti Kadłubkonis Episcopi Cracoviensis, 1612

Chronica seu originale regum et principum Poloniae, short name Chronica Polonorum, is a Latin history of Poland written by Wincenty Kadłubek between 1190 and 1208 CE. The work was probably commissioned by Casimir II of Poland. Consisting of four books, it describes Polish history.

Kadłubek included in his work many legendary and anachronistic events in an attempt to connect Polish history to antiquity, for example battles against Julius Caesar or events from early medieval Poland (for example the story of Princess Wanda). Such practice was not uncommon among chronicles in the Middle Ages.

The first, second, and third books are composed as a classical dialogue, where the author positions himself as a witness of a conversation. The Chronica's use of this style is unique in medieval literature but was frequently used in antiquity.

From May 2024, the copy of the Chronicle from the 15th century is presented at a permanent exhibition in the Palace of the Commonwealth.

== Bibliography ==
- Grodecki R., Mistrz Wincenty Kadłubek, biskup krakowski, „Rocznik Krakowski” 10 (1923), s. 30-61.
- Kozłowska –Budkowa Z., Rezygnacje biskupów krakowskich Wincentego i Iwona, „Nasza Przeszłość” 23 (1970), s. 35-44.
- Kürbis B., Wstęp, [w:] Mistrz Wincenty (tzw. Kadłubek), Kronika polska, przeł. i oprac. B. Kürbis, wyd. 2 przejrzane, Wrocław 1996, s. III-CXXXII.
- Kürbis B., Wstęp, [w:] Mistrza Wincentego Kronika Polska, tłum. K. Abgarowicz i B. Kürbis, wstęp i komentarze B. Kürbis, Warszawa 1974, s. 5-70.
- Plezia M., Kadłubek, dzieje imienia, [w:] Od Arystotelesa do Złotej Legendy, Warszawa 1958, s. 314-316.
- Plezia M., Mistrz Wincenty zwany Kadłubkiem, [w:] Pisarze staropolscy, sylwetki, Warszawa 1991, T. 1, s. 102-111.
- Plezia M., Wstęp, [w:] Magistri Vincentii Chronica Polonorum, edidit, praefatione notisque instruixit Marianus Plezia, Kraków 1994, s. V-XXXIV.
- Śliwiński K., W sprawie pochodzenia mistrza Wincentego, „Studia Źródłoznawcze” 24 (1979), s. 169-171.
- tzw. Kadłubek Wincenty, w: Bibliografia literatury polskiej Nowy Korbut, T. 2, Piśmiennictwo staropolskie, hasła osobowe A-M, Warszawa 1964, s. 299-302.
- Zeissberg H., Dziejopisarstwo polskie wieków średnich, [przeł. A. Pawiński] Warszawa 1877, T. 1, s. 89-96.
