= Family tree of Polish monarchs =

This is a family tree of the Kings of Poland.

king of Poland
high duke
duke

Chościsko
Piast the Wheelwright
Siemowit
Lestek
Siemomysł died ca. 950–960
Mieszko I 930–960–992
Judith of Hungary; 969–988	Bolesław I Chrobry; 967–992–1025	Emnilda of Lusatia; 975–1017
Bezprym; 986–1031–1032	Mieszko II Lambert; 990–1034 r. 1025–1031,1032–1034
Bolesław the Forgotten r. 1034–1039	Casimir I the Restorer; 1016–1038–1058
Bolesław II the Generous; 1041–1081 r. 1058–1079	Przecława	Władysław I Herman; 1044–1079–1102	Judith of Bohemia; 1058–1086
Mieszko Bolesławowic; 1069–1089	Zbigniew; 1073–1113 r. 1102–1107	Zbyslava of Kiev; 1090–1112	Bolesław III Wrymouth; 1086–1102–1138	Salomea of Berg; 1101–1144
Władysław II the Exile; 1105–1159 r. 1138–1146
Bolesław I the Tall; 1127–1201	Mieszko IV Tanglefoot; 1130–1210–1211	Mieszko III the Old; 1126–1202 r. 1173–1177, 1191, 1198–1199, 1202	Bolesław IV the Curly; 1125–1146–1173	Casimir II the Just; 1138–1194 r. 1177–1191, 1191–1194	Agnes of Poland; 1137–>1182	Mstislav II of Kiev ?–1172 r. 1167–1169, 1170
Odon of Poznań; 1149–1194	Henry I the Bearded; 1165–1238 r. 1225, 1232–1238	Casimir I of Opole r. 1211 – 1230	Władysław III Spindleshanks; 1161–1231 r. 1202–1206, 1227–1229	Leszek I the White; 1186–1227 r. 1194–1198, 1199–1202, 1206–1210, 1211–1225, 1225–1227	Konrad I of Masovia; 1187–1247 r. 1229–1232, 1241–1243	Anastasia (Maria) of Poland	Vsevolod IV of Kiev r. 1203, 1206, 1207, 1208–1212	Roman the Great of Halych; 1152–1205 r. 1189, 1198–1205
Władysław Odonic; 1190–1239	Henry II the Pious; 1196–1238–1241	Bolesław V the Chaste; 1226–1243–1279	Michael of Chernigov r. 1223–1235, 1242–1246	Daniel of Galicia; 1201–1264 r. 1213–1264
Bolesław the Pious 1224/27 – 1279	Przemysł I of Greater Poland; 1221–1257	Elisabeth of Wrocław; 1232–1265	Bolesław II Rogatka; 1225–1278 r. 1241	Henry III the White; 1230–1266	Constance of Wrocław; 1227–1257	Casimir I of Kuyavia; 1211–1267	Euphrosyne of Opole; 1228–1292	Rostislav of Macsó r. 1248–1262	Leo I of Galicia c. 1228 – c. 1301; 1264–1301
Przemysł II; 1257–1290–1296	Henryk IV Probus; 1258–1288–1290	Leszek II the Black; 1241–1279–1288	Ottokar II of Bohemia c. 1233 – 1253 – 1278	Kunigunda of Halych 1245 – 1261 – 1285
Rudolf I of Bohemia titular king 1281–1306–1307	Elisabeth Richeza of Poland; 1286–1335	Wenceslaus II of Bohemia; 1271–1296–1305	Judith of Habsburg; 1271–1297	Hedwig of Kalisz; 1266 – 1339	Władysław I the Elbow-high; 1261–1306–1333	Euphemia of Kuyavia; 1265–1308	Yuri I of Galicia; 1252–1308
John of Bohemia titular king 1296–1346 r. 1310–1335	Elisabeth of Bohemia; 1292–1330	Wenceslaus III of Bohemia; 1289–1305–1306	Anne of Bohemia; 1290–1313	Henry of Bohemia titular king 1265–1335 r. 1307–1310	Casimir III the Great; 1310–1333–1370	Elisabeth of Poland; 1305–1380	Charles I of Hungary; 1286–1342	Anastasia of Halych	Alexander prince of Tver; 1301–1339
John II of France; 1319–1364	Bonne of Luxembourg; 1315–1349	William, Count of Celje; 1361–1392	Anna of Poland; 1366–1425	Louis I of Hungary; 1342–1370–1382	Elisabeth of Poland; 1326–1361	Uliana of Tver; 1325–1391
Charles V of France; 1338–1380	Anna of Cilli; 1381–1416	Władysław II Jagiełło; 1362–1386–1434	Jadwiga of Poland; 1373–1384–1399	Elizabeth of Pomerania; 1347–1393
Louis I, Duke of Orléans; 1372–1407	Sigismund, Holy Roman Emperor; 1368–1437
John, Count of Angoulême; 1399–1467	Sophia of Halshany; 1405–1461	Elizabeth of Luxembourg; 1409–1442
Charles, Count of Angoulême; 1459–1496	Władysław III; 1424–1434–1444	Casimir IV; 1427–1447–1492	Elizabeth of Austria; 1436–1505
Francis I of France; 1494–1547	Vladislaus II of Hungary and Bohemia; 1456–1516	John I Albert; 1459–1492–1501	Alexander I 1461–1501–1506	Sigismund I the Old; 1467–1506–1548	Anna of Poland; 1476–1503
Henry II of France; 1519–1559	Ferdinand I, Holy Roman Emperor; 1503–1564	Anne of Bohemia and Hungary; 1503–1547	Sophie of Pomerania; 1498–1568
Henry III; 1551–1589 r. 1574–1575	Maximilian I 1527–1576 elected 1575	Charles II, Archduke of Austria; 1540–1590	Elisabeth of Austria; 1526–1545	Sigismund II Augustus; 1520–1529–1572	John III of Sweden; 1537–1592	Catherine Jagiellon; 1526–1583	Anna Jagiellon; 1523–1596 r. 1575–1586	Stephen Báthory; 1533–1575–1586	Adolf of Holstein-Gottorp; 1526–1586
Maximilian II; 1558–1618 elected 1587	Ferdinand II, Holy Roman Emperor; 1578–1637	Constance of Austria; 1558–1631	Sigismund III Vasa; 1566–1587–1632	John Adolf, Duke of Holstein-Gottorp; 1575–1616
Maria Anna of Austria; 1610–1665)	Ferdinand III, Holy Roman Emperor; 1608–1657	Cecilia Renata of Austria; 1611–1644	Władysław IV; 1595–1632–1648	John II Casimir; 1609–1672 r. 1648–1668	Frederick III, Duke of Holstein-Gottorp; 1597–1659
John III Sobieski; 1629–1674–1696	Ferdinand Maria, Elector of Bavaria; 1636–1679	Leopold I, Holy Roman Emperor; 1640–1705	Eleanor of Austria; 1653–1697	Michał Korybut Wiśniowiecki; 1640–1669–1673	Christian Albert, Duke of Holstein-Gottorp; 1641–1695
Theresa Kunegunda Sobieska; 1676–1730	Maximilian II Emanuel, Elector of Bavaria; 1662–1726	Maria Antonia of Austria; 1669–1692	Joseph I, Holy Roman Emperor; 1678–1711	Augustus II the Strong; 1670–1733 r. 1697–1704, 1709–1733	Stanisław Leszczyński; 1677–1766 r. 1704–1709, 1733–1734	François Louis, Prince of Conti; 1664–1709 elected 1697	Christian August of Holstein-Gottorp, Prince of Eutin; 1673–1726	Frederick IV, Duke of Holstein-Gottorp; 1671–1702
Charles VII, Holy Roman Emperor; 1697–1745	Maria Amalia of Austria; 1701–1756	Maria Josepha of Austria; 1699–1757	Augustus III; 1696–1734–1763	Marie Leszczyńska; 1703–1768	Louis XV of France; 1710–1774	Joanna Elisabeth of Holstein-Gottorp; 1712–1760	Charles Frederick, Duke of Holstein-Gottorp; 1700–1739
Maria Antonia of Bavaria; 1724–1780	Frederick Christian elector of Saxony	Francis Xavier of Saxony; 1730–1806	Princess Maria Josepha of Saxony; 1731–1767	Louis, Dauphin of France; 1729–1765	Stanisław August Poniatowski; 1732–1798 r. 1764–1795	Catherine the Great; 1729–1795–1796	Peter III of Russia; 1728–1762
Frederick August duke of Warsaw	Paul I of Russia; 1754–1796–1801
Maria Augusta of Saxony; 1782–1863	Alexander I 1777–1801–1825	Nicholas I 1796–1825–1855
Alexander II; 1818–1858–1881
Alexander III; 1845–1881–1894
Nicholas II; 1868–1918 r. 1894–1917
