= Medieval Polish Alliances =

This is a list of alliances made by the Polish leaders during the Middle Ages (formation to 15th century).

== Mieszko I ==
Otto II, Holy Roman Emperor (marriage with the German Oda)

Boleslaus I the Cruel of Bohemia (later marriage with his daughter, Doubravka)

Henry II Quarrelsome, Duke of Bavaria (support in war over Holy Roman throne)

Otto III, Holy Roman Emperor (took part in a meeting at Quedlinburg, helped in war against Brandenburg)

== Bolesław Chrobry ==
Otto III, Holy Roman Emperor (helped in war against Obotrites)

Sviatopolk I the Accursed of Kiev (put on throne by Bolesław)

Henry II, Holy Roman Emperor (result of peace treaty, later marriage of Bolesław's son with Richeza of Lotharingia)

Pechenegs (received help in war against the Kievan Rus')

Moravia (former Greater Moravia) (received help in war against Germans and Czechs)

Saint Stephen I of Hungary (received help in war against Kievan Rus')

== Mieszko II Lambert/Gnuśny ==
Saint Stephen I of Hungary (received help in war against Germans and Czechs)

== Bezprym ==
Conrad II, Holy Roman Emperor (part of coalition)

Yaroslav I the Wise (part of coalition)

== Kazimierz I Odnowiciel ==
Yaroslav I the Wise (strengthened by marriage with his sister, Maria Dobroniega)

== Bolesław II Szczodry ==
Béla I the Champion/Wisest of Hungary (supported throne)

Géza I of Hungary (supported throne)

Sweyn II Estridsson of Denmark (supported in a raid against British tribes)

Saxons (supported rebellion)

== Bolesław III Krzywousty ==
Kievan Rus' nobles (received help in war against Czechs)
