= Treaties of Bautzen and Merseburg =

The Treaties of Bautzen and Merseburg may refer to

- The Peace of Bautzen of 1018, which ended the German-Polish War (1002–1018)
- The Treaty of Merseburg of 1033, an agreement between Mieszko II of Poland and the Holy Roman Emperor Conrad II
- An armistice of 1813, made during the War of the Sixth Coalition between Napoleon and Russia and Prussia
