= Danutė of Lithuania =

Lithuanian princess (c. 1358 – 1424)

- Born: c. 1358
- Died: 26 November 1424
- Spouse: Janusz I of Warsaw
- Issue: Janusz the Younger; Bolesław Januszowic; Konrad Januszowic
- Dynasty: Gediminids
- Father: Kęstutis
- Mother: Birutė

Danutė of Lithuania (baptized Anna; c. 1358 – 26 November 1424), was a Lithuanian princess of the Gediminid dynasty and by marriage Duchess of Warsaw.

She was a daughter of Kęstutis, Grand Duke of Lithuania, and his second wife, Birutė.

== Life ==
Very little reliable information is known about her life. Probably between 1371/73 Danutė married Janusz I of Warsaw; two facts that supported this date are: —in 1371, Pope Gregory XI sent a letter to Siemowit III of Masovia, father of Janusz I, urging him not to allow his subordinates to help pagan Lithuanians. If the marriage took place by that time, the pope would have certainly condemned the Christian duke for the alliance with the pagans; and —in 1379 Kęstutis, while negotiating with the Teutonic Knights, called Günter von Hohenstein, komtur of Ostróda, godfather of Danutė. It means that by that time she was already baptized and married, although is probably that she was already baptized before her wedding.

The marriage between Danutė and Janusz I was notorious as the longest among the members of the Piast dynasty. In occasion of her wedding, Danutė received from Janusz I as a dowry the towns of Drohiczyn, Mielnik, and Brześć with their surrounding villages.

She bore her husband four children, all of whom predeceased them both:

- Daughter (Olga?) (1373/76 - ca. 8 December 1401), who married firstly in 1388 to Voivode Petru I of Moldavia and secondly with the Moldavian magnate Wilczę.
- Janusz the Younger (1376/81 - ca. 18 October 1422), who married Katharina of Melsztyn, daughter of Spytek.
- Bolesław (1385/86 - ca. 4 May 1424), married Anna Feodorovna, granddaughter of Algirdas.
- Konrad (ca. 1400 - 9 December 1412/13).

In 1382, after escaping from Kreva, Vytautas the Great first asked his sister Danutė and his brother-in-law Janusz for help in the Lithuanian Civil War against his cousin Jogaila. However, he did not receive any assistance and had to turn to the Teutonic Knights.

In older historiography was believed that Danutė survived her husband on the basis of records from the Calendar of Płock, who dated her death on 25 May 1448. Currently, it's believed that this was a mistake with the death date of her daughter-in-law Anna Feodorovna, who died in 1458. Danutė died between 17 October 1422 and 20 December 1425, probably on 26 November 1424. She was probably buried at St. John's Archcathedral, Warsaw.

== See also ==
- Gediminids
