= Bolesław Januszowic =

Polish prince

Bolesław Januszowic (Polish: Bolesław Januszowic; 1385/86 – ca. 4 May 1424), was a Polish prince and member of the House of Piast.

He was the second son of Duke Janusz I of Warsaw and Danutė of Lithuania, a daughter of Kęstutis.

== Life ==
From an early age he was prepared to take over the government in Masovia, alongside his older brother Janusz the Younger. In 1409 he was sent by his father at the head of a retaliatory expedition against the Teutonic Order, culminating with the conquest and burning of Działdowo and 14 surrounding villages. Two years later (1411), as an envoy of the Dukes of Masovia he participated in the act of signing of the Peace of Thorn.

In 1412 Bolesław was in Kraków, at the court of King Władysław II Jagiełło, and he, among others princes, traveled with the King to the frontier city of Stará Ľubovňa to a meeting with the German King Sigismund of Luxembourg.

In 1414 he participated in another war with the Teutonic Knights, this time in person coordinating all the activities of the Masovian troops. After 1422, following the death of his older brother, Bolesław received the district of Czersk, where he exercised his own court and government.

Bolesław died unexpectedly after 1420 but certainly before 4 May 1424. He was buried next to his father at St. John's Archcathedral, Warsaw.

== Marriage and issue ==
Around 1412, Bolesław married the Lithuanian princess Anna (d. 25 May 1458 in Czersk), a daughter of Feodor Olgerdovich, Prince of Rylsk, Ratnie and Bryansk, one of the eldest sons of Algirdas, Grand Duke of Lithuania, and in consequence, a half-brother of King Władysław II Jagiełło (born from Algirdas' second marriage). They had three children:

- Konrad (1413 - 21 July 1427).
- Euphemia (bef. 1420 - bef. 3 March 1436), married before 7 February 1435 to Michael Žygimantaitis, a Lithuanian prince.
- Bolesław IV (ca. 1421 - 10 September 1454), who succeeded his grandfather Janusz I in all his domains as his only surviving male descendant.
