= Otto Bolesławowic =

Polish prince (1000–1033)

Otto Bolesławowic (1000–1033) was member of the House of Piast. He was the third son of King Bolesław the Brave of Poland. Having inherited no land from his father, he fled to Germany. After the defeat of his brother Mieszko II Lambert in 1032, Otto received a part of Poland to rule but died shortly after.

== Family history ==
Otto was the youngest child of Bolesław the Brave and Emnilda of Lusatia. He was named after Emperor Otto III, who probably stood as his godfather. In 1018 he was present at his father's fourth and last marriage, to Oda of Meissen on Cziczani.

After the death of his father in 1025, Otto expected to obtain a part of Bolesław's heritage, according to Slavic custom, under which a father should divide his legacy among all his sons. However, because Poland became a kingdom, the country could not be divided, and in consequence Otto received nothing from his father's legacy. The sole heir of Bolesław was Mieszko II Lambert, his eldest son from his marriage to Emnilda. Along with Otto, his older half-brother Bezprym was also disinherited. Bezprym was the older son of Bolesław I by his second wife, Judith of Hungary, who was repudiated shortly after Bezprym was born. Possibly as a result of this he was allegedly disliked by his father, who determined that Mieszko II was to be his sole heir.

== Conflict ==
Soon after Mieszko took over the governing of Poland, he either expelled his brothers or forced them to flee from the country. Otto went to Germany, probably to Meissen to the court of his sister Regelinda. In 1031 a combined attack of Kievan and German forces led to the downfall of Mieszko II, who had to flee to Bohemia. The government was taken by Bezprym alone; this allegedly caused Otto's resentment and his approach to Mieszko II. As a result, in the first half of 1032 Bezprym was murdered probably as a result of a conspiracy organized by his half-brothers.

In Merseburg on 7 July 1032, Emperor Conrad II divided Poland between Mieszko, Otto, and their cousin Dytryk, grandson of Mieszko I. It is unknown exactly how the country was divided between them.

Otto died in 1033 either of natural causes or killed by his own vassals.
