= Treaty of Merseburg =

1033 treaty between Poland and the Holy Roman Empire

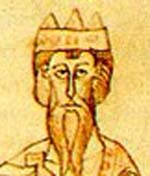
Conrad II, Holy Roman Emperor

The Treaty of Merseburg of 1033 was an agreement between the Salian Holy Roman Emperor Conrad II and the Piast king of Poland Mieszko II Lambert, settling the question of Polish succession which had been contested between Mieszko Lambert and his half-brothers Bezprym, Otto, and Dytryk, since the death of Bolesław I the Brave. Poland was divided into three parts with Mieszko Lambert designated as the supreme ruler. In exchange for the Emperor's support however, Mieszko was forced to renounce the title of king, which had been acquired in 1025 by his father and give up control over Lusatia and Upper Lusatia. Soon after the treaty was concluded, however, Otto died of natural causes and Mieszko prevented Dietric from assuming power in his portion of the divided Poland. Mieszko also subsequently continued to use the title of king until his death shortly after the treaty in 1034.

== Background ==
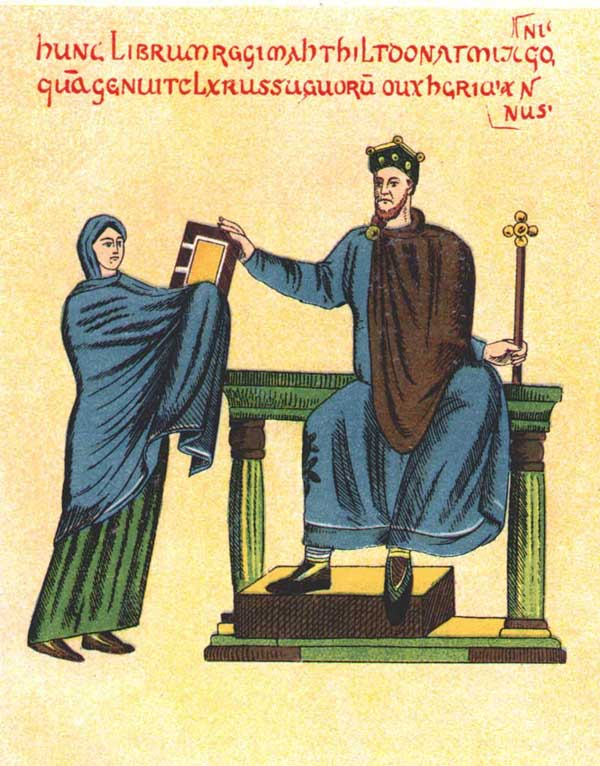
Mieszko II and the Duchess Matilda on a 19th-century copy of a now lost medieval Miniature

The Emperor Henry II was succeeded by Conrad II, while Boleslaw I, who had crowned himself King of Poland two months before Henry's death (1025), was succeeded by Mieszko II Lambert. In 1028, Mieszko II attacked the eastern marches of Saxony. As a consequence, the see of the Bishopric of Zeitz was relocated to the more secure Naumburg, and Conrad II launched several counter-attacks. Mieszko II avoided open battle and withdrew into difficult terrain, namely forests nearly impassable for the heavy German cavalry. Conrad II was supported by Olrich (Udalrich) of Bohemia, who in the course of the 1029 campaign gained Moravia.

In 1030, Mieszko II again raided the eastern marches, but in 1031 was repulsed by Conrad II and forced to make peace. In the agreement, Mieszko II renounced his claims to the Lusatian march and Upper Lusatia.

== Merseburg (1033) ==
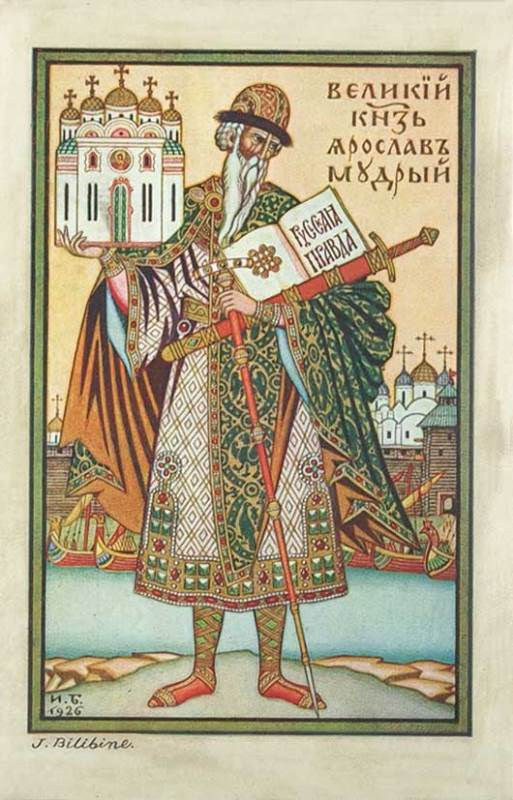
Grand Prince of Rus' Yaroslav the Wise by Ivan Bilibin

After the peace of Bautzen (1031), Yaroslav I of Kiev attacked Mieszko II from the east. Yaroslav I had supported Mieszko II's older half-brother Bezprym in the succession of Boleslaw I, and granted him refuge at his court when Mieszko II had assumed power. With Yaroslav I's support, Bezprym ousted Mieszko II, but was murdered in 1032, most likely on account of his cruelty and brutal suppression of noble's opposition. In contrast to his half-brother, Bezprym had not taken on the title of a Polish king in order to gain support from Conrad II, and even sent the Polish royal insignia to the emperor. After Bezprym's death, Conrad's wife, Empress Gisela, as well as several German nobles interceded on Mieszko's behalf and he returned to power, and attended a Hoftag in Merseburg in 1033.

There, Mieszko II renounced claims to the Lusatian march and Upper Lusatia (Milzenerland), and renounced claims to the title of a king. Henry II divided Poland into three parts, giving Silesia to Mieszko's half brother Otto, while his other half brother, Dytryk, most likely received Greater Poland. Mieszko most likely got Masovia and Lesser Poland. He confirmed Mieszko's superiority over Otto and Dytryk. However, in the same year Otto died of natural causes and Mieszko successfully exiled Dytryk, thus reuniting the core of Polish lands. He also continued to use the title of king, despite the agreement at Merseburg and Polish documents of the time referred to him as such.

However Mieszko II died soon after in 1034, and upon his death a Pagan reaction in Poland erupted (although some aspects of it were present earlier and contributed to Mieszko's difficulties in dealing with Conrad and Yaroslav). Subsequently, his wife Richeza as well as his son Casimir I fled to Germany.

== Sources ==
Bibliography

- Boshof, Egon (2008). Die Salier (in German) (5 ed.). Kohlhammer. ISBN 978-3-17-020183-5.
- Knefelkamp, Ulrich (2002). Das Mittelalter. UTB M (in German). Vol. 2105 (2 ed.). UTB. ISBN 3-8252-2105-9.
