= Casimir III =

Casimir III may refer to:

- King Casimir III of Poland (1310–1370), last King of Poland from the Piast dynasty
- Casimir III, Duke of Pomerania (1348–1372), oldest son of Barnim III, Duke of Pomerania-Stettin
- Casimir III of Płock
