= Bolesław V of Warsaw =

Bolesław V
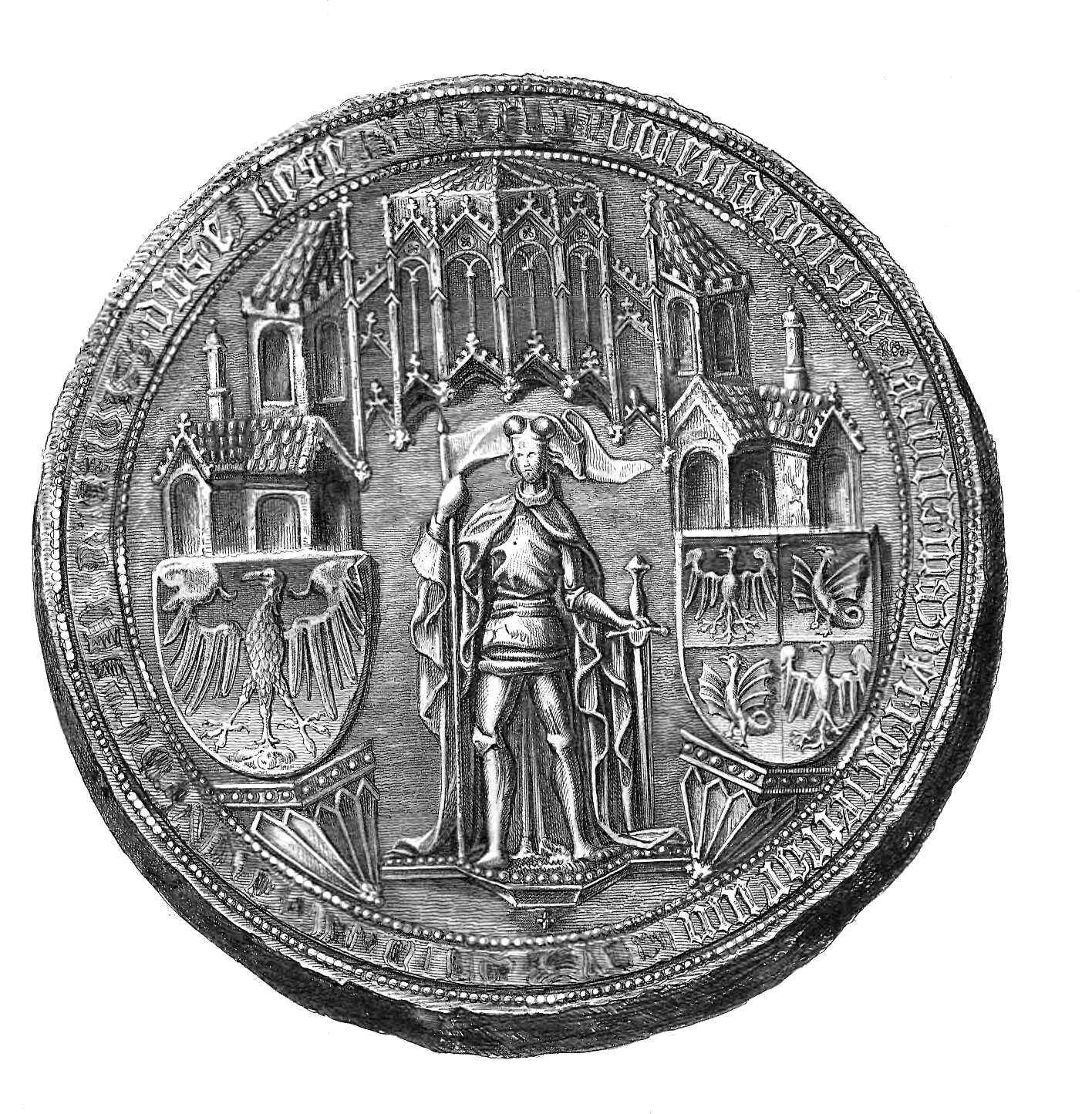
- Bolesław V's personal Seal, 1462.

Duke of Warsaw, Nur, and Liw
- Reign: 3 April 1471 -
- Predecessor: Bolesław IV of Warsaw
- Regent: Barbara Aleksandrówna; Paweł Giżycki, Bishop of Płock
- Died: 27 April 1488
- Burial: Warsaw
- Spouse: Anna of Radzanów
- House: Piast dynasty
- Father: Bolesław IV of Warsaw
- Mother: Barbara Aleksandrówna

Bolesław V of Warsaw (pl: Bolesław V warszawski; ca. 1453 - 27 April 1488), was a Polish prince member of the House of Piast in the Masovian branch. He was a Duke of Czersk, Liw, Warsaw, Nur, Łomża, Ciechanów, Różan, Zakroczym and Wyszogród during 1454-1471 jointly with his brothers (under regency until 1462), Duke of Płock, Wizna, Płońsk and Zawkrze during 1462-1471, and after the division of the paternal domains in 1471, sole ruler over Warsaw, Nur and Liw. In 1484 he abdicated his rule over Błonie, Tarczyn, Kamieniec and Zakroczym.

He was the seventh son of Bolesław IV of Warsaw and Barbara Aleksandrówna, a Lithuanian princess, (granddaughter of Vladimir Olgerdovich). The premature death from four of his older brothers during 1452-1454 left him as the third surviving son of his family.

== Life ==
After the death of his father on 10 September 1454, Bolesław V and his siblings where place under the guardianship of their mother Barbara and Paweł Giżycki, Bishop of Płock. The regency ended in 1462, when their older brother Konrad III attained his majority and became in the legal guardian of his younger brothers.

Bolesław V and his brothers formally attained their majority on 3 April 1471. In the division of the paternal domains, he received Warsaw, Nur and Liw.

In 1476 Bolesław V together with his brother Janusz II protested against the incorporation of Sochaczew (who was held by Anna of Oleśnica, widow of Władysław I, as a part of her Qprawa wdowia) to the Polish Kingdom by sending his troops to the disputed city. The King, however, had other plans, and finally Masovian Piasts had to abandon their ambitious plans.

The conflict for Sochaczew caused a temporary coolness in the relations between Bolesław V and the Polish Kingdom, which was expressed in his neutrality during the dispute between Nicolaus von Tüngen and King Casimir IV for the Bishopric of Warmia.

On 20 July 1477 Bolesław V married with Anna, a daughter of Zygmunt of Radzanów, Chorąży of Płock and Voivode of Belz. The union, however, due to the low origins of the bride, was morganatic, thus any children from the marriage had rights of inheritance. Around 1480, Bolesław V, under the pressure of his brothers, divorce her. They had no children.

For unknown reasons, in 1484 Bolesław V resigned to the brothers parts of his domains: Konrad III received Zakroczym and Janusz II obtain Kamieniec, Błonie and Tarczyn.

Bolesław V died on 27 April 1488 and was buried in Warsaw.
