= Janusz II of Płock =

Polish prince (1455–1495)

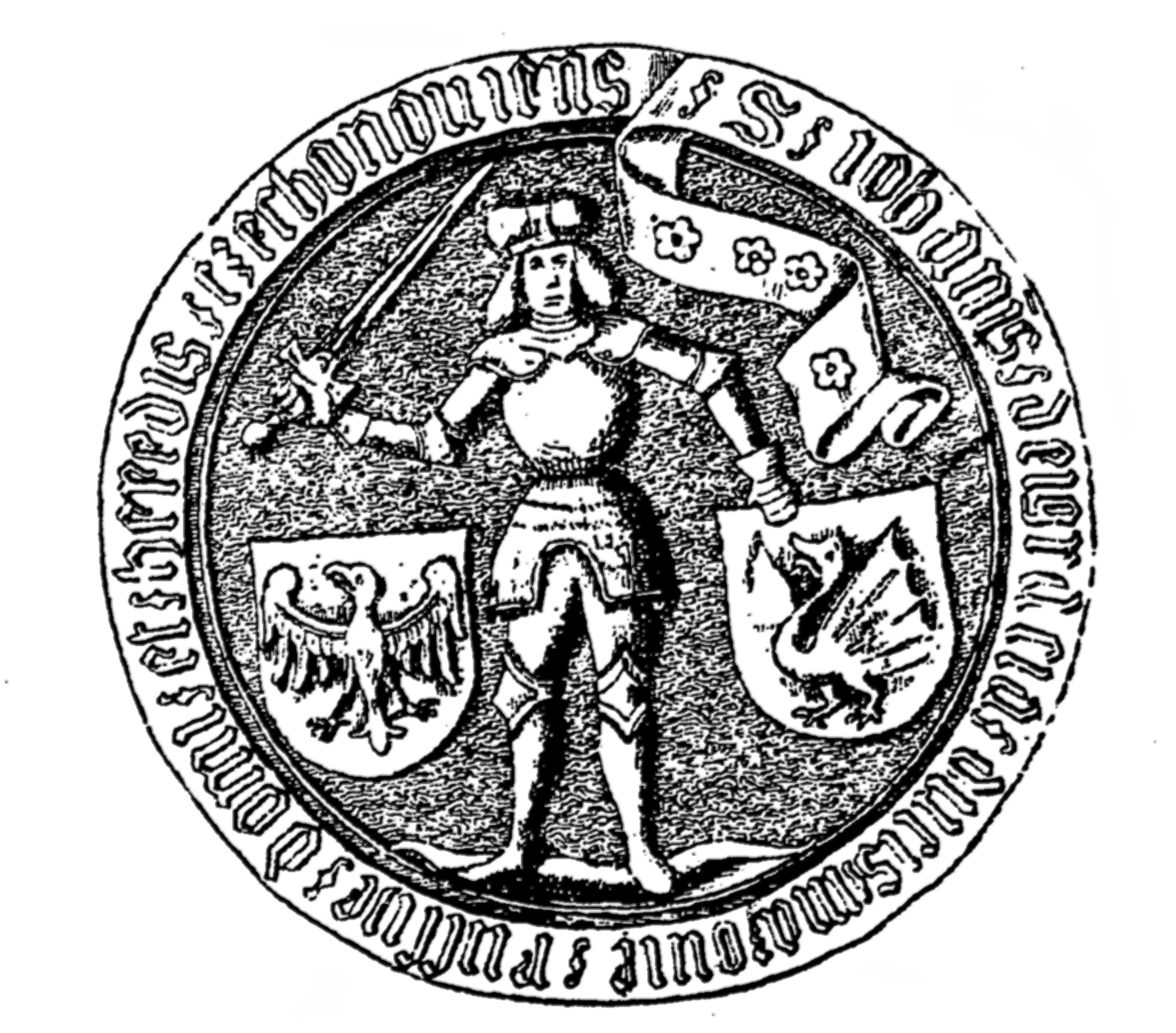
Seal of Janusz II.

Janusz II of Płock (pl: Janusz II płocki; ca. 1455 – 16 February 1495), was a Polish prince member of the House of Piast in the Masovian branch. He was a duke of Warsaw, Nur, Łomża, Liw, Ciechanów, Wyszogród and Zakroczym during 1454–1471 jointly with his brothers (under regency until 1462), Duke of Płock, Płońsk, Zawkrze and Wizna during 1462–1471, and after the division of the paternal domains in 1471, sole ruler over Ciechanów and Łomża, since 1475 also ruler over Płock, Płońsk, Zawkrze and Wizna, since 1484 ruler over Błonie, Tarczyn and Kamieniec, since 1489 ruler over Wyszogród.

== Family ==
Janusz II was born about 1455. He was the eighth and youngest son of Bolesław IV of Warsaw and Barbara Aleksandrówna, a Lithuanian princess, (granddaughter of Vladimir Olgerdovich). His father died on 10 September 1454.

== Life ==
After their father's death, Janusz II and his siblings were place under the guardianship of their mother Barbara and Paweł Giżycki, Bishop of Płock. The regency ended in 1462, when their older brother Konrad III attained his majority and became in the legal guardian of his younger brothers.

Janusz II and his brothers formally attained their majority on 3 April 1471. As the youngest brother, in the division of the paternal domains, he received the small districts of Ciechanów, Łomża and Różan. His domains became significantly increased in 1475, when after his brother Casimir III was consecrated as Bishop of Płock he renounced to his domains and divided them between his brothers: Janusz II received Płock, Płońsk, Zawkrze and Wizna. In the following years, his domains continue to be expanded thanks to the renunciations of his brothers: in 1484 his brother Bolesław V ceded to him the districts of Błonie, Tarczyn and Kamieniec, and in 1489 his brother Konrad III gave to him Wyszogród in exchange of his resignation over Warsaw, after the townspeople chosen Janusz II to be their new ruler after Bolesław V's death in 1488.

In foreign policy, Janusz II, in addition to his close cooperation with his brothers (especially with Bolesław V, with for many years had a co-rulership), he tried to limit the growing influence of the Jagiellonian dynasty. To this end, Janusz II joined the Teutonic Order in 1472; the relationship with them must be extremely close, since the Grand Master of the Order Johann von Tiefen granted to Janusz II the title of familiaris since 1489.

In 1476 Janusz II together with his brother Bolesław V protested against the incorporation of Sochaczew (who was held by Anna of Oleśnica, widow of Władysław I, as a part of her Qprawa wdowia) to the Polish Kingdom by sending his troops to the disputed city. The King, however, had other plans, and finally Masovian Piasts had to abandon their ambitious plans.

On 7 August 1492 King Casimir IV of Poland died, and the Dukes of Masovia (who wanted to escape from the shadow of the Jagiellonian dynasty) proposed Janusz II as candidate for the crown. However, when Janusz II arrived to Kraków, it was certain that his candidacy for the throne was futile and Casimir IV's son, John I Albert, was elected new King.

Janusz II died on 16 February 1495 in Płock, and was buried in the local Cathedral. He never married or had children. His sudden death (contemporary sources claimed that "one day was healthy, the other was dead") caused rumours about poisoning. However, this never can be proved.

Earlier agreements stipulated that his duchy was to be surrendered to the king of Poland as a liege lord. Despite the resistance of his brother Konrad III, after his death Płock was incorporated to the Kingdom of Poland.
