= Barbara Aleksandrówna =

Lithuanian princess (c. 1428 – c. 1490)

Duchess of Warsaw
- Tenure: Between 1440 and 1443 - 10 September 1454

Regent of Czersk, Liw, Warsaw, Nur, Łomża, Ciechanów, Różan, Zakroczym, and Wyszogród
- Reign: 1458–1462
- Predecessor: Anna Feodorovna of Ratnie
- Successor: Konrad III Rudy
- Born: c. 1428
- Died: between 1488 and 1492
- Burial: Nowe Miasto, Płońsk County
- Spouse: Bolesław IV of Warsaw
- Issue: Bolesław; Janusz; Konrad III Rudy; Bolesław; Casimir III of Płock; Janusz; Anna; Sophia; Bolesław V of Warsaw; Janusz II of Płock
- House: Gediminid
- Father: Aleksandras Olelka
- Mother: Anastasia Vasilievna

Barbara Aleksandrówna (c. 1428 – between 1488 and 1492) was a princess and wife of prince Bolesław IV of Warsaw. She was the daughter of Alexander Włodzimierzowic, the prince of Kiev.

Between 1440 and 1443, she married Bolesław IV of Warsaw. Her husband died on September 10, 1454. After death of her mother-in-law in 1458 she became a regent in the name of her minor sons Konrad III, Bolesław V, Kazimierz III, and Janusz II. She usually entitled herself ducissa et gubernatrix Mazouie etc.

She was buried in Nowe Miasto, Płońsk County.
