= Bolesław IV of Warsaw =

Bolesław IV
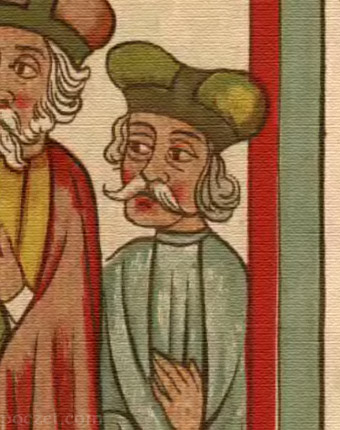
- Bolesław IV of Warsaw, 15th century

Duke of Warsaw
- Reign: 8 December 1429 – 10 September 1454
- Predecessor: Janusz I
- Successor: Bolesław V of Warsaw
- Regent: Anna Feodorovna of Ratnie

Sovereign Duke of Podlachia
- Reign: 1440–1444
- Born: c. 1421
- Died: 10 September 1454; Opinogóra Górna
- Burial: St. John's Archcathedral, Warsaw
- Spouse: Barbara Aleksandrówna
- Issue: Bolesław; Janusz; Konrad III Rudy; Bolesław; Casimir III of Płock; Janusz; Anna; Sophia; Bolesław V of Warsaw; Janusz II of Płock
- House: Piast dynasty
- Father: Bolesław Januszowic
- Mother: Anna Feodorovna of Ratnie

Bolesław IV of Warsaw (Polish: Bolesław IV warszawski; c. 1421 – 10 September 1454), was a Polish prince and member of the House of Piast in the Masovian branch. He was Duke of Warsaw during 1429–1454 (under regency until 1436) and sovereign Duke of Podlachia in 1440–1444.

He was the second son of Bolesław Januszowic (in turn second son of Janusz I of Warsaw) and Anna Feodorovna of Ratnie, a daughter of Fedor Olgierdowicz who ruled part of Volhynia.

== Life ==
The successive deaths of his older uncle, father and brother between 1422–1427 left Bolesław IV as the only surviving male heir of Janusz I, who in order to protect his rights, in 1428 forced his local nobility to pay homage to the seven-year old prince as his future ruler; thanks to this, when the Duke died one year later (8 December 1429), Bolesław IV could assumed the power without much difficulties; however, because he was a minor at that moment, his mother Anna took the regency on his behalf until 1436, when he attained his majority and began his personal rule.

In foreign policy, Bolesław IV initially tried to stay neutral in the conflicts between the Teutonic Order and the Kingdom of Poland (and his ally the Grand Duchy of Lithuania), but soon he was forced to choose a side in 1431, at the outbreak of the Polish–Teutonic War. Bolesław IV then decided to send auxiliary troops to the Polish King. The Peace of Brześć Kujawski, signed on 31 December 1435, guaranteed the inviolability of Bolesław IV's domains.

In subsequent years, Bolesław IV was involved in the political intrigues at the Kingdom of Poland, moreover, closely related with the Polish–Lithuanian union. Bolesław IV strongly supported to the party led by the Bishop of Kraków, Zbigniew Oleśnicki. The Duke of Warsaw's adherence to the Bishop of Kraków was noted in his participation in the Confederation of Nowy Korczyn in April 1438. He refused to send troops to the Hussite confederates led by Spytek of Melsztyn at the Battle of Grotniki.

Two years later, another conflict drew the attention of Bolesław IV. On 20 March 1440, Sigismund Kęstutaitis, Grand Duke of Lithuania, was killed. The Polish King Władysław III acted quickly and named his younger brother Casimir as the regent of the Grand Duchy in his name. However, the Lithuanians had other plans, and when Casimir arrived to Vilnius, they proclaimed Sovereign Grand Duke and not regent. The Polish, in opposition declared their support to another candidate to the throne, Michael Žygimantaitis, Sigismund's son. Michael was briefly married with Bolesław IV's sister Euphemia in 1435–1436, and after his father's murder he was forced to seek refuge at the court of his brother-in-law in 1440.

Bolesław IV wanted to take advantage of this situation and shortly after he captured the district of Podlachia. The Lithuanians threatened Boleslaw with war, because the previous agreement between King Władysław II and Janusz I only granted the land during the latter's lifetime.

In 1444 began the Lithuanian–Masovian War for the possession of Podlachia; following Casimir's orders, the voivode Jonas Goštautas captured Mielnik and Drohiczyn. At this point the Polish decided to aid Bolesław IV and announced that they soon send their troops; however, at the same time, they sent representatives to negotiate an agreement with the Lithuanians. Thanks to this, the feared Polish–Lithuanian War didn't occur. Only in 1446 Bolesław IV decided to waive for good his claims over Podlachia and Węgrów in exchange for a compensation of 6,000 silver marks.

Soon a complete change in the political situation erupted. The death of King Władysław III in the Battle of Varna on 10 November 1444 reopened the disputes over the Polish throne succession. The closest male relative and heir apparent was the Grand Duke Casimir of Lithuania, but the local magnates refused to renew the union between both countries. Zbigniew Oleśnicki, after a prolonged interregnum, decided to choose another candidate who would take the empty throne only if Casimir made a definitive renounce. The deadline for the decision of Casimir was supposed to be on 26 June 1446. Previously, on 30 March the Crown Council was reunited and considered two main candidates: Frederick II, Elector of Brandenburg (supported by the Polish Episcopate) and Bolesław IV. Finally, in another meeting at Piotrków Trybunalski they formally supported the Duke of Warsaw's candidacy: the decisive argument for this was that he belonged to the old Piast dynasty. However, the election could be definitive only after Casimir made his formal renunciation. Despite this, Bolesław IV decided to support the rights of Casimir, in order to neutralize the danger that suppose the election of Frederick II of Brandenburg as King. Casimir finally decided to take the throne, and on 25 June 1447 he was crowned King of Poland at Kraków. Bolesław IV, fully reconciled with the new King, took part in the ceremony and also paid homage to him.

In 1453, Bolesław IV suddenly reassumed his pretensions over Podlachia. However, he soon waived his claims, this time for good, after a meeting with the King at Parczew, where in exchange of his renunciation he recovered the district of Drohiczyn.

In domestic politics Bolesław IV continued the line of his grandfather Janusz I, taking care of the local legislation under the Kulm law. In order to increase his applicability, he ordered the translation of the codes from German to Polish.

Bolesław IV died on 10 September 1454 at his estate of Opinogóra Górna. He was buried in St. John's Archcathedral, Warsaw.

== Marriage and issue ==
Between 1440/45, Bolesław IV married Barbara (ca. 1428 – 25 July between 1488/92), a Lithuanian princess, daughter of Alexander Vladimirovich, Duke of Slutsk–Kapyl and Grand Prince of Kiev (also named Olelko; in turn he was a son of Vladimir Olgerdovich, a son of Algirdas). They had ten children:

- Bolesław (1445 – before 1453)
- Janusz (c. 1446 – before 1454)
- Konrad III the Red (c. 1447/48 – 28 October 1503)
- Bolesław (c. 1448 – before 1452)
- Casimir III (10 June 1448/8 June 1449 – 9 June 1480)
- Janusz (c. 1450/53 – c. 1454/55)
- Anna (c. 1450/53 – 19 November 1477/14 September 1480), married c. 1465 Przemysław II, Duke of Cieszyn
- Sophia (c. 1452/54 – after 10 September 1454)
- Bolesław V (c. 1453 – 27 April 1488)
- Janusz II (posthumously, c. 1455 – 16 February 1495)
