= Janusz I the Old =

Polish prince

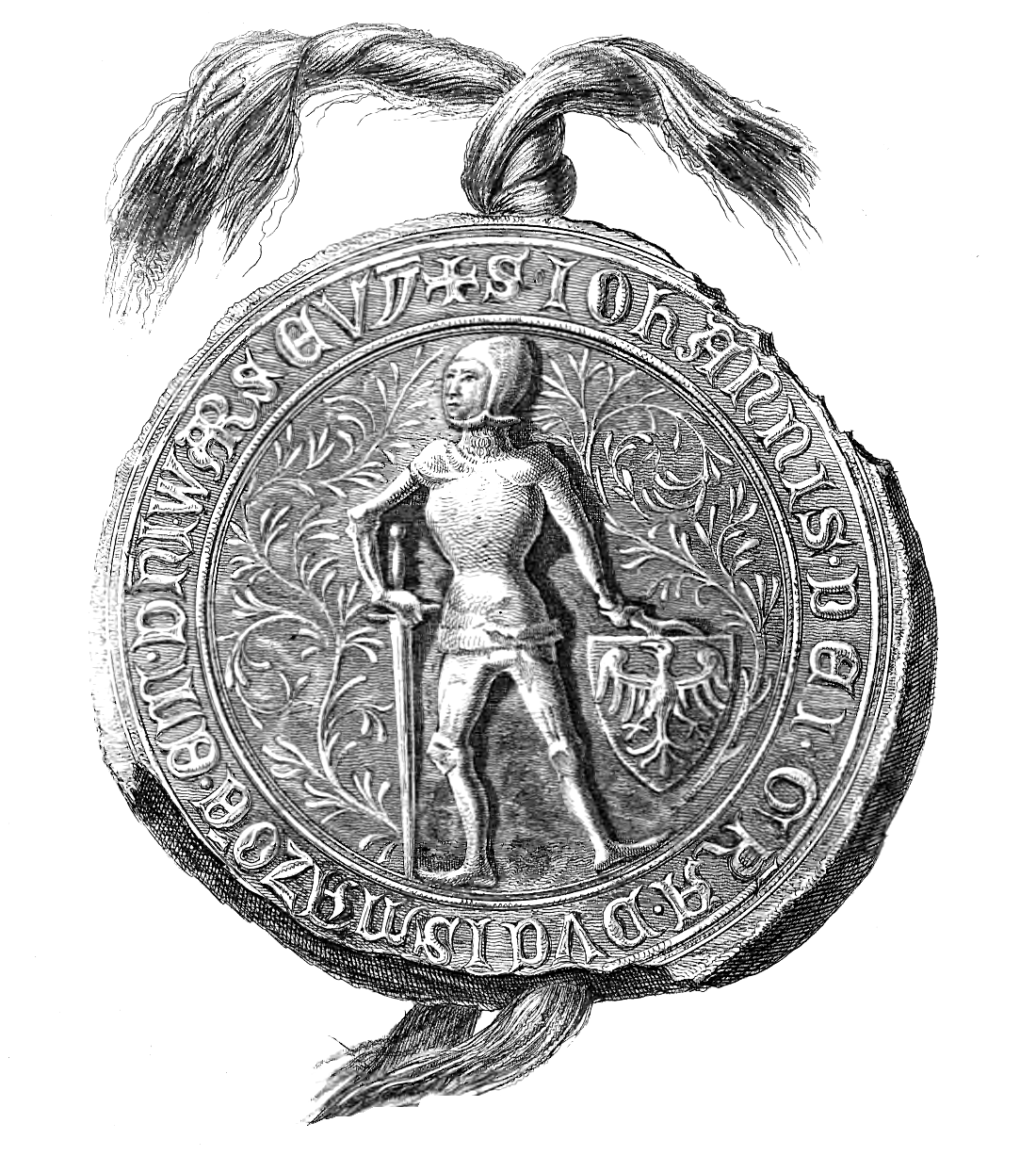
Pedestrian seal of Janusz I, c. 1376.

Janusz I of Warsaw (pl: Janusz I warszawski), also known as Janusz I the Old (pl: Janusz I Starszy) (c. 1347/52 – 8 December 1429), was a Polish prince member of the House of Piast in the Masovian branch, from 1373/74 Duke of Warsaw and after the division of the paternal inheritance between him and his brother in 1381, ruler over Nur, Łomża, Liw, Ciechanów, Wyszogród and Zakroczym. In addition, he was a vassal of the Polish Kingdom since 1391 for the fief of Podlachia (only during his lifetime).

He was the eldest son of Siemowit III, Duke of Masovia and his first wife Euphemia, daughter of Nicholas II of Opava. Due to an error of chronicler Jan Długosz was previously assumed that Janusz I was born c. 1329, and it wasn't until modern time that this date could be corrected until a much later one, c. 1346. Evidence of this fact was that only in 1373/74 he received his own duchy (with its capital in Warsaw).

As the result of the partition of Masovia between him and his younger brother Siemowit IV after the death of their father on 16 June 1381, Janusz I finally obtain the totality of his domains: Warsaw, Nur, Łomża, Liw, Ciechanów, Wyszogród and Zakroczym.

== Policy with the Kingdom of Poland ==
In this area, Janusz I faithfully maintained a close cooperation with the successive Polish rulers: Louis of Anjou, Jadwiga and Władysław II Jagiełło. One expression of this were the three homages performed by him in the years 1373, 1383 and 1387. In this way, Janusz I was directly opposed to the policy of his brother Siemowit IV, who tried to take advantage of the difficulties in the Angevin dynasty and wanted to obtain the Polish crown for himself. After the death of King Louis of Poland and Hungary, Janusz I recognized the rights of Jadwiga to the Polish crown. To this end, in 1383 he went to Buda, where he offered support forces, in return for which he received a salary of 24,000 florins per year taken from the salt mines of Bochnia. His pro-Angevin policies soon caused that Janusz would be protected from the army of the future Sigismund of Luxemburg, the future Holy Roman Emperor, in his way to rescue his future wife Mary, Queen of Hungary and Jadwiga's sister.

== Policy towards Lithuania and seizure of Podlachia ==
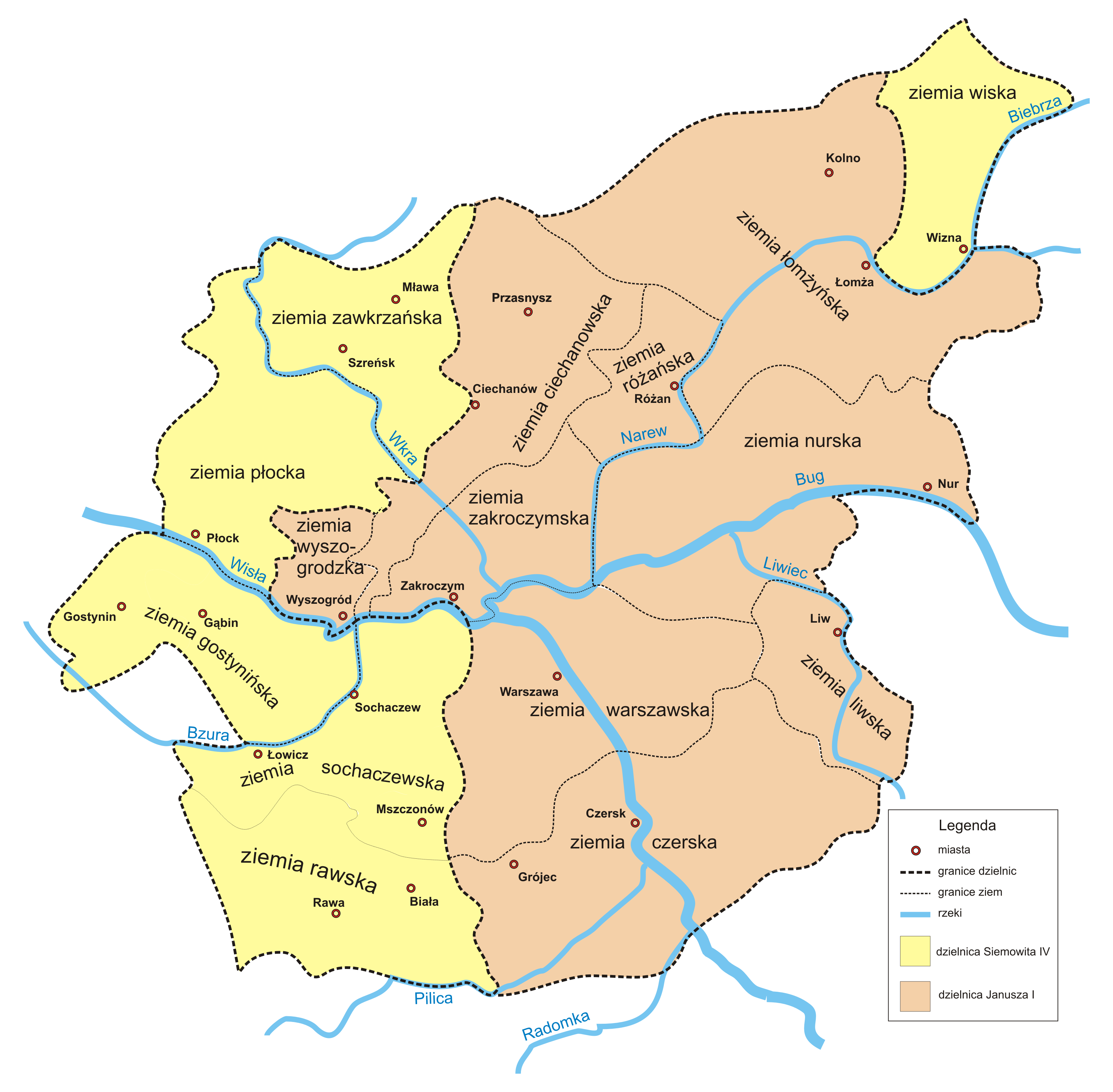
Division of Masovia (1381–1426).

The preference for the Polish interests in Władysław II Jagiełło in detriment of the Grand Duchy of Lithuania caused a civil war between him and his uncle Kęstutis. Janusz I took advantage of this situation in 1382 to capture the towns of Podlachia and Drohiczyn, claiming them as a part of the dowry of his wife Danutė (a daughter of Kęstutis), with he had married around 1371/73. This acquisition, however, wasn't permanent, because later in that year, the Polish King, after finally defeated his uncle, managed to recover this lands. Janusz I, not wanting to further complicated the situation, received with extreme coldness the fugitive Vytautas, despite being his brother-in-law, and after his refusal to accept baptism sent him to the Teutonic Knights.

The relations between Władysław II Jagiełło and Janusz I where repaired only in 1387, when the Duke of Warsaw after the election of Władysław II as King of Poland, formally recognized him recognized and then took part in the royal trip to Vilnius, the first step of the Christianization of Lithuania. His good relations with Władysław II where became even more notorious in 1389 during a visit of Vytautas to Masovia, during which Janusz I, in the middle of a feast, declined a golden cup offered to him by Vytautas, which was considered as an insult. On 2 September 1391 Władysław II Jagiełło formally gave Janusz I the previously disputed lands of Podlachia and Drohiczyn in perpetuity, and with them he also received the towns of Mielnik, Bielsk Podlaski and Suraż ("terram nostram Drohiczensen, Melnyk, Surasz, Byelsko ac omnibus villis in eisdem districtubus").

== Policy towards the Teutonic Knights ==
The friendly relations between Janusz I and Władysław II Jagiełło caused a permanent state of hostility between Masovia from the Teutonic Order. In 1393, and for unknown reasons, Janusz I was captured during a visit to the border castle in Złotoria near Narew by the komturs of Balga and Ragnit and imprisoned at Malbork Castle by orders of the Grand Master, Konrad von Jungingen. Probably with this actions they wanted to provoke the Polish for war with the Order. As a result of the intervention of Władysław II Jagiełło, who sent deputies to the Teutonic Knights, Janusz I was released. In 1404 the Knights again captured Janusz I, this time with his wife and sons, and kept them in Saxony. Again, only the intervention of the Polish King could release them.

In August 1409 the komturs of Ostróda and Pokarmin invaded Janusz's domains. In retaliation, Janusz I's son Bolesław destroyed Działdowo and 14 surrounding villages.

Coat of arms of Janus I.

Between 1409 and 1411 Janusz I continued his support to Władysław II Jagiełło in the great war against the Teutonic Order and fielded a banner of cavalry to aid the Polish King. In the village of Czerwińsk nad Wisłą, Janusz I designated the place of concentration of the united Polish-Lithuanian army. From there him, at the head his army organized their squadrons of knights and went to Grunwald, where on 15 July 1410 took place the battle. Janusz I then participated in the rest of the campaign. Władysław II, as way to recompensate his fidelity, give to him the Teutonic castles of Nidzica, Ostróda and Olsztyn. However, these acquisitions weren't permanent, because seven months later (1 February 1411) after the sign of the Peace of Thorn, he was forced to return the castles to the Teutonic Order.

When in 1414 another war broke out with the Teutonic Knights (the called Hunger War), Janusz I again decided to support the King. This time, however, probably because of his advanced age, he didn't participate directly in the campaign but sent his son Bolesław.

== Internal policy and reforms ==
In domestic politics, Janusz I took a thorough reform of the economic policies of the principality given the German Kulm law to 24 cities including Czersk (1383), Ciechanów (1400), Różan (1403), Warsaw New Town (1408), Drohiczyn (1408), Łomża (1418), Grójec (1419), Maków Mazowiecki and Mińsk Mazowiecki (1421), Kolno and Tykocin (1425), Przasnysz and Ostrołęka (1427) and Kamieńczyk (1428). An extremely important step took place in 1406, when he moved his capital from Czersk to newly developing strategic town of Warsaw and actively worked to develop his towns, fortified his castles and strongholds. A clear sign of this develop was the creation of a Collegiate at St. John Church and the build of a castle (who was later known as the oldest part of the future Royal Palace). Among the most notorious castles fortified during this time are the former capital Czersk, Liw and Ciechanów.

== Marriage and issue ==
Around 23 November 1371/73, Janusz I married the Lithuanian princess Danutė (c. 1358 - c. 24 November 1424) -who in baptism took the name Ana-, a daughter of Kęstutis and sister of Vytautas, both Dukes of Trakai and Grand Dukes of Lithuania; in consequence, she was a first-cousin of the later King Władysław II Jagiełło of Poland (born Jogaila, son of Algirdas, a brother of Kęstutis). The union produced at least four children:

- Daughter (Olga?) (1373/76 - c. 8 December 1401), who married firstly in 1388 to Voivode Petru II of Moldavia and secondly with the Moldavian magnate Wilczę.
- Janusz (1376/81 - c. 18 October 1422).
- Bolesław (1385/86 - c. 4 May 1424).
- Konrad (c. 1400 - 9 December 1412/13).

Janusz I survived all his children and passed, by testament, his domains to his eldest surviving grandson, Bolesław IV (son of the second son, Bolesław).

He died on 8 December 1429 at Czersk, and was buried at St. John's Archcathedral, Warsaw.
