= Emnilda =

Emnilda of Lusatia
- Duchess consort of the Polans
- Born: c. 970–975
- Died: 1017; Kraków
- Spouse: Bolesław I the Brave
- Issue: a daughter, abbess; Regelinda, Margravine of Meissen; Mieszko II Lambert; a daughter, Grand Princess of Kiev; Otto Bolesławowic
- Father: Dobromir of Lusatia

Emnilda (Polish: Emnilda słowiańska; c. 970–975 – 1017), was a Slavic noblewoman and Duchess of Poland from 992 by her marriage with the Piast ruler Bolesław I the Brave.

== Ancestry ==
She was a daughter of Dobromir, a Slavic ruler who in a 1013 entry was named venerabilis senior by the contemporary chronicler Thietmar of Merseburg (975–1018). Most historians believe that Emnilda's father was a ruler over Lusatia and the Milceni lands which since 963 were part of the Saxon Eastern March. The German chronicler referred to him as senior which in this context most likely meant "prince", and showed a certain familiarity with the person. This suggests that Dobromir was someone well known to Thietmar, who was Bishop of Merseburg from 1009, and hence Emnilda's father was from the area of the Polabian Slavs close to his episcopal see. In view of her German name, Emnilda's mother possibly was the member of a Saxon comital dynasty.

However, other historians have argued for a different background. Henryk Łowmiański believed Emnilda to have been a daughter of the last independent prince of the Vistulans in the Kraków area. Tadeusz Wasilewski saw in her a Moravian princess.

== Life ==
The wedding of Emnilda and the heir of the Polish throne, Bolesław, took place around 987. It was the third marriage for the young prince: his previous two wives, the daughter of Margrave Rikdag of Meissen (perhaps called Hunilda or Oda) and the Hungarian princess Judith, were repudiated after few years, but both produced offspring to Bolesław, a daughter and a son, Bezprym. During her marriage, Emnilda bore her husband five children, two sons (the future Mieszko II Lambert and Otto) and three daughters, one of them became an abbess and the other two, Regelinda and Amelia were married to Margrave Herman I of Meissen and Grand Prince Sviatopolk I of Kiev, respectively.

She was mentioned by Gallus Anonymus and Thietmar of Merseburg; both chroniclers noted she was a wise and charming person and no negative opinion of her can be found in the historic sources. It is claimed that Emnilda had a great influence on her husband, and perhaps also in the Polish state affairs. She probably accompanied Bolesław to the meeting with Henry II at Merseburg on 23 May 1013 and perhaps she actively promoted the recognition of their son Mieszko II as a vassal of the Emperor for his government over Moravia, a fact who put in jeopardy the succession rights of Bolesław I's eldest son Bezprym, who at the end was excluded in favor of his younger half-brother.

The exact date of Emnilda's death is unknown, but is assumed that this happened in 1017 at the latest, or, more likely, at the end of 1016, because on 3 February 1018 Bolesław I married with his fourth and last wife, Oda of Meissen.

Emnilda Born: c. 970–975 Died: 1017
Royal titles
Preceded by Oda of Haldensleben	Duchess consort of the Polans; 992–1017	Succeeded by Oda of Meissen
