= Konrad Januszowic =

Polish prince

Personal details
- Born: Possibly 1400 Mazovia, possibly Warsaw, Jagiellonian Dynasty
- Died: December 9, 1412-1413 Mazovia

Konrad Januszowic (ca. 1400 - 9 December 1412 or 1413), was a Polish prince member of the House of Piast.

He was the youngest son of Duke Janusz I of Warsaw and Danutė of Lithuania, a daughter of Kęstutis.

== Life ==
He is only mentioned in the Tomicki Genealogy; there is listed among the descendants of the Dukes of Masovia, indicating that he died childless. Konrad's name was found frequently in the Masovian branch of the Piast dynasty. He died at a young age, probably long before the death of his father. His burial place is unknown.
