= Bolesław the Forgotten =

King of Poland (disputed)
- Reign: 1034 – 1038/1039
- Predecessor: Mieszko II Lambert
- Successor: Casimir I the Restorer
- Died: 1038/1039
- Polish: Bolesław Zapomniany
- House: Piast
- Father: Mieszko II Lambert
- Mother: Richeza of Lotharingia?

Bolesław the Forgotten (Polish: Bolesław Zapomniany) or the Cruel (Bolesław Okrutny; before 1016 – 1038/1039) was a semi-legendary King of Poland of the Piast dynasty from 1034 until his death in 1038 or 1039. He was allegedly the first-born son of Mieszko II Lambert.

== Sources which mention his existence ==
He is described in the Wielkopolska Chronicle, written in the 14th century, where he is said to have taken power in Poland after the death of his father, Mieszko II, as he was the eldest son. According to the chronicle, he was killed because of his extreme cruelty and sentenced to the damnatio memoriae. The text describes him as follows:

When he [Mieszko II] died in the year of our Lord 1033, he was succeeded by his first-born son, Bolesław. As soon as he was crowned king, he caused his mother many insults. His mother, coming from an excellent family, unable to bear his iniquity, having taken her youngest son, Casimir, returned to her native land in Saxony, to Brunswick, and having placed her son there to be taught, she retired to some convent of nuns. Bolesław, meanwhile, because of his severity and the horrors of his crimes, badly ended his life, and though he was awarded the crown royal, he shall not be placed among the Polish kings and princes.

However, there is no mention of any coronation of a Polish ruler in this period, which would have to be recorded in the German sources (as was the case with the coronations of Bolesław I and Mieszko II), probably because there was no royal insignia in the country, which had been returned to the Emperor by the well-known Bezprym earlier in the year 1031.

This brief description of Bolesław in the Wielkopolska Chronicle is very similar to the information about Bezprym, who was described in the Chronicles of Hildesheim:

1032. This year, Bezprym was killed by his own men, not without the instigation of his brothers, because of his cruelty and tyrannical rule.

Bolesław's life is also described in a text written by Wincenty z Kielczy (13th century) and some other sources. In the Annals of Kraków under the date of 1038, the information about "king Bolesław's" death was placed. This date cannot be connected with Bolesław I the Brave (who died in 1025) and Bolesław II the Bold (dead in 1081, deposed and exiled), so it may refer to the Forgotten. In addition, an indirect reference to his existence may be found in the Małopolska Chronicle, where Bolesław III Wrymouth is called Bolesław IV. Also, in the Tyniec Codec (destroyed in the 19th century), Bolesław II the Bold was given the Roman numeral III. This gives some grounds to believe that between Bolesław I the Brave and Bolesław II could be placed another Bolesław.

Foreign chronicles also favored the existence of Bolesław the Forgotten, for example:

- The Chronicles of Braunweiler, where is mentioned the persecution of Queen Richeza, wife of Mieszko II, by a "concubine" (Latin: pellex) is mentioned: "Queen Richeza was divorced from her husband, the King, because of his hatred and the incitement of someone called concubine." No mention of any alleged son of this anonymous concubine, whose supporters of his existence identify with the Forgotten (which, however, introduced a contradiction with the reports of the Wielkopolska Chronicle, where he was mentioned as the first-born son of Mieszko II and Richeza).
- The Chronica Boemorum of Cosmas of Prague: "In the year of the Incarnation of the Lord 1037 died the Duke Bolesław, who Mieszko was deprived of sight". However, historians who refuted the existence of the Forgotten alluded that this Duke could be Boleslaus III of Bohemia, who was imprisoned and blinded by orders of Bolesław I (and the mention of Mieszko could be a mistake of the chronicler).
- The Hungarian chronicle of Bishop Chartiritusa (first half of the 13th century) mentions the help given for Bolesław II to Hungary: "Henry won and the King of Alba and Kaulem relented, and having taken the three princes Levente, Bela and Andrew escaped to Poland at the side of their widowed grandmother Duchess Dąbrówka, who had already raised his eighteen-year-old grandson Bolesław as a young adult, gallant and fierce in battle". However, this text contains several errors (for example, a non-existent Dąbrówka is identified as the grandmother of the Hungarian princes), and in consequence, its value is questionable.

== In Polish historiography ==
In older times, Bolesław was widely described as a historical monarch of Poland. Many Polish historians were sure about his existence: Tadeusz Wojciechowski, Oswald Balzer, Roman Grodecki, Feliks Koneczny, Stanisław Zakrzewski, and Zygmunt Wojciechowski. They had the following arguments:

- Casimir I the Restorer was sent to a monastery in Germany. Usually, only the younger sons were sent to the monasteries, implying that Casimir had an older brother.
- Name Casimir had not been used earlier in the Piast dynasty. It would be natural to name the eldest son as Bolesław, to honor Mieszko's father - Bolesław I the Brave.
- In the period 1034–1039, Casimir was living in Germany. It would have been impossible to leave the Polish state alone, without a monarch, for such a long time.

Some say that Gallus Anonymus failed to describe Bolesław because of the ruler's part in the pagan reaction in Poland.

== See also ==
- History of Poland (966–1385)
