= Roman Grodecki =

- Born: Roman Grodecki; April 21, 1889; Rzeszów
- Died: April 17, 1964 (aged 74); Kraków
- Citizenship: Polish
- Occupation: historian

Roman Grodecki (21 April 1889, in Rzeszów – 17 April 1964, in Kraków), Poraj coat of arms, was a Polish economic historian, a professor at the Jagiellonian University in Kraków, and a member of the Polish Academy of Arts and Sciences.

Grodecki's scientific research centered on medieval Poland, particularly the history of Polish coinage, monetary history and monetary policy under the Piast dynasty. Although he was not a numismatic himself, Grodecki was widely read by coin collectors of his day, and he engaged in academic discussions and polemics with the noted Polish numismatic Marian Gumowski. In addition to economic history, Grodecki published works on the general history of medieval Poland, focusing on Polish diplomacy of the period, the history of Silesia and the life of Duke Zbigniew, the older brother of Bolesław III Wrymouth.

His students included Jerzy Wyrozumski.

== Life ==
Grodecki was born in Rzeszów to Jan Grodecki, a tax official, and Karolina Gorylska. He spent his childhood in Głogów Małopolski and attended school in Kolomyia and Bochnia. After completing a gymnasium he enrolled at the Jagiellonian University in Kraków, in 1907. He published his first, Książęca włość trzebnicka na tle organizacji majątków książęcych w Polsce w XII wieku, work in 1911, while still a student. This thesis became the basis for his doctorate, which he received a year later. Between 1914 and 1917 he served in the Polish Legions. he finished his studies after World War I, receiving his habilitation in 1920.

In 1926 he became a part-time member of the Polish Academy of Learning. World War II and the Nazi invasion of Poland interrupted the existence of the organization and as a consequence Grodecki did not become a full member of the academy until 1946.

== World War II ==
At the outbreak of World War II, Grodecki was already fifty years old but nonetheless an officer of the Polish army reserves. During the mobilization of the first days of the war he left Kraków in order to join his unit. As a result he escaped the fate of many of his academic colleagues from the Jagiellonian University, who were arrested by the Germans during the Sonderaktion Krakau, and most of whom later perished in Nazi concentration camps.

He spent most of the German occupation in Lwow. There he taught at the Underground University (higher education for Poles was banned by the Germans).

== Major works ==
- Nieznane pieczęcie m. Krakowa (1912) ("Undiscovered coin stamps of Kraków")
- Dzieje klasztoru premonstrateńskiego w Busku w wiekach średnich (1913) ("History of the Premonstratensian Abbey in Busk during the Middle Ages")
- Studya nad dziejami gospodarczymi Polski w XII wieku (1916) ("Studies in economic history of Poland of the 12th century")
- Dziesięcina mennicza w Polsce średniowiecznej (1918–1919) ("The monetary tithe in medieval Poland")
- Przyczynki do dziejów rolnictwa w Polsce średniowiecznej (1919) ("Development of agriculture in medieval Poland")
- Mincerze we wcześniejszym średniowieczu polskim (1921) ("Coin minters in early medieval Poland")
- Polityka mennicza książąt polskich w okresie piastowskim (1921) ("Monetary policy of Polish dukes during the Piast period")
- Przywilej menniczy biskupstwa poznańskiego z roku 1232 (1921) ("The monetary privileges of Poznan Bishops in 1232")
- Mistrz Wincenty Kadłubek, biskup krakowski (1923) ("The Master Wincenty Kadłubek, Bishop of Krakow")
- Dzieje Polski do roku 1194 (1926) ("History of Poland up to the year 1194")
- Dzieje Polski średniowiecznej (1926, with Stanisław Zachorowski and Jan Dąbrowski) ("History of medieval Poland")
- Dzieje Polski do roku 1386 (1928, in: "Polska, jej dzieje i kultura") ("History of Poland up to the year 1386")
- Dzieje polityczne Śląska do roku 1290 (1930) ("Political history of Silesia up to the year 1290")
- Dzieje zwierzchności menniczej w Polsce średniowiecznej (1930) ("History of monetary sovereignty in medieval Poland")
- Początki immunitetu w Polsce (1930)
- Kraków i ziemia krakowska (1934, with Kazimierz Lepszy and Józef Feldman)
- Kongres krakowski w roku 1364 (1939)
- Początki gospodarki folwarcznej w Polsce (1949)
- Sprawa św. Stanisława (1979)
