= Casimir III of Płock =

Polish prince

Casimir III of Płock (Polish: Kazimierz III płocki; 10 June 1448/8 June 1449 – 9 June 1480), was a Polish prince and member of the Masovian branch of the House of Piast. He was a Duke of Warsaw, Nur, Łomża, Liw, Ciechanów, Wyszogród and Zakroczym during the period 1454–1471 jointly with his brothers (under regency until 1462), Duke of Płock, Płońsk, Zawkrze and Wizna from 1462 to 1471, and after the division of the paternal domains in 1471, sole ruler over Płock, Wizna, Wyszogród (until 1474), Płońsk and Zawkrze until his abdication in 1480, and Bishop of Płock during 1471–1480 (as secular administrator until 1475).

He was the fifth son of Bolesław IV of Warsaw and Barbara Olelkovna of Slutsk-Kapy, a Lithuanian princess, (granddaughter of Vladimir Olgerdovich). The premature death of three of his older brothers during 1452–1454 left him as the second surviving son of his family.

== Life ==
After the death of his father on 10 September 1454, Casimir III and his siblings were placed under the guardianship of their mother Barbara and Paweł Giżycki, Bishop of Płock. The regency ended in 1462, when their older brother Konrad III attained his majority and became the legal guardian of his younger brothers.

Thanks to the efforts of Princess Catherine of Płock, in 1462, Casimir III and his brothers were able to acquire the districts of Płock, Płońsk and Zawkrze, although they lost Belz, Rawa Mazowiecka and Gostynin, which were formally incorporated to the Kingdom of Poland.

Casimir III and his brothers formally attained their majority on 3 April 1471. In the division of the paternal domains, he was given Płock, Płońsk, Wizna, Wyszogród and Zawkrze. Despite inheriting his own estates, Casimir III decided to enter the Church and, even in his youth, was appointed to the position of Dean and Canon of Płock Cathedral.

After the death of Ścibor z Gościeńczyc, Bishop of Płock, on 4 May 1471, Casimir III announced his candidacy for the post. Unfortunately, he was opposed by King Casimir IV, who chose his Vice-Chancellor of the Crown and Royal Secretary Andrzej Oporowski as successor, while the Chapter supported their own candidate, Ścibor Bielski. However, when the chapter realized that they could not impose their own candidate, they decided to support Casimir III. The case was finally settled in Rome, where, despite the vigorous intrigues of the Polish king, the Pope finally decided in favour of Casimir III, thanks in part to the major support who received from Frederick III, Holy Roman Emperor (who through his mother Cymburgis was related with the Masovian Piasts). The election of Casimir III took place despite his not being the minimum age for a canonical post - 30 years. As a result, he ruled the Bishopric as only a secular administrator until 10 September 1475, when, after the grant of a Papal dispensation for his age, Casimir III was finally installed as Bishop of Płock at Pułtusk Church.

After his consecration, Casimir III resigned his estates to his brothers: Conrad III obtain Wyszogród and Janusz II.

Casimir III was not able to make a great impact as a bishop. Securing the episcopal office cost him large sums of money, which he then tried to recover from the church treasury, causing understandable opposition from the chapter. The case went to the Pope, who helped the diocese taking his finances under his direct control. Soon after, Casimir III died of the plague on 9 June 1480 at Pułtusk, where he was buried.
