= Janusz the Younger =

Polish prince

Janusz the Younger (pl: Janusz Młodszy; 1376/81 – c. 18 October 1422), was a Polish prince member of the House of Piast.

He was the eldest son of Duke Janusz I of Warsaw and Danutė of Lithuania, a daughter of Kęstutis.

== Life ==
In connection with his preparation to take power in Masovia, Janusz was sent to Kraków, where he resided at the court of King Władysław II Jagiełło.

Before 19 March 1408 Janusz married Katharina (bef. 1395 – ca. 23 March 1467), a daughter of Spytek of Melsztyn, who was killed in fight with Tatars in the Battle of the Vorskla River on 12 or 16 August 1399. The main reason for the marriage between with a Piast prince with a minor noblewoman was the fortune left by her father. As a dowry, Katharina received the amount of 5,000 fines; however, her brothers delayed the payment for many years, and only in 1420 after a series of processes, were they forced to pay the entire amount. Katharina's dowry was secured by Janusz with some properties located in the towns of Różan and Nur.

Janusz died childless in 1422; he predeceased his father by seven years. After his death, his widow remarried, with Nicholas Bialucha of Michalów, Castellan of Kraków.
