= Bezprym =

Duke of Poland

Duke of Poland
- Reign: 1031 – 1032
- Predecessor: Mieszko II Lambert
- Successor: Otto Bolesławowic
- Born: c. 986–987; Poland
- Died: 1032 (aged 45–46)
- Dynasty: Piast dynasty
- Father: Bolesław the Brave
- Mother: Unnamed Hungarian

Bezprym (Old Polish: Bezprzym [ˈbɛspʂɨm]; c. 986–1032) was the duke of Poland from 1031 until his death. He was the eldest son of the Polish king Bolesław the Brave, but was deprived of the succession by his father, who around 1001 sent him to Italy in order to become a monk at one of Saint Romuald's hermitages in Ravenna.

Expelled by his half-brother Mieszko II Lambert after the death of their father, Bezprym became ruler of large areas of Poland in 1031 following a simultaneous attack by German and Kievan forces and Mieszko II's escape to Bohemia. His reign was short-lived and, according to some sources, extremely cruel. He was murdered in 1032 and Mieszko II returned to the throne of Poland. It is speculated that a pagan reaction began during his short reign.

== Onomastics ==
In primary sources Bezprym appears as: Besprim (Thietmar's Chronicle), Besfrim (Annalista Saxo), or Bezbriem (Chronicles of Hildesheim and Annales Altahenses). This name was not used among the Polish nobility but was known in Bohemian sources, where it appears as: Bezprim, Bezprem, or Bezperem. According to one of the hypotheses, the name is of pure West Slavic origin, and was probably originally pronounced as Bezprzem or Bezprzym. Due to tradition and the impossibility of determining the correct version of the name, Bezprym remains the form used, although, according to K. Jasiński, it probably requires modifications. This name meant literally "stubborn", "self-confident, not willing to retreat". The name of the Hungarian city of Veszprém is considered to be derived from the same West Slavic name.

Older historiography frequently combined the figures of Bolesław the Brave's sons Otto and Bezprym. Marian Gumowski also suggested, on the basis of numismatic research, that this "combined" prince could have governed the Duchy of Bohemia in 1003. These theories are based on the chronicle of Wipo of Burgundy, who described only one brother of Mieszko II, Otto. Modern historians assume, however, that Bezprym did exist and that the chronicler erroneously combined Otto and Bezprym into one person.

== Early years ==
Bezprym was the only child of Bolesław the Brave born from his second marriage with an unknown Hungarian princess who is by some historians identified as Judith, daughter of the Hungarian ruler Géza, while others believe her to be Karolda (Géza's sister-in-law), or to come from minor princely family, given that disolution of the marriage did not result in any conflict between Poland and Hungary. Soon after the Prince's birth, the marriage of his parents ended; the reason for this is unknown.

Shortly after disolution of his second marriage, Bolesław I married Emnilda, who bore him five children. The eldest son of this union, the future Mieszko II Lambert, was born in 990.

Little is known about Bezprym's youthful years, in contrast with his half-brother Mieszko II, whose youth was fully described in several contemporary sources. This probably showed that his father disliked him and considered Mieszko II as his successor since his birth, which was confirmed by Bolesław I's later political activity.

Bezprym was then destined to a church career, a fact that was demonstrated in the Vita of St. Romuald, a hermit from Ravenna. It was stated that in one of the hermitages resided a son of a Polish Duke, who in 1001 gave him a horse. According to modern historians, this Polish prince could only be Bezprym. However, in earlier historiography, it was theorised that the Polish prince who lived in the hermitage of Ravenna was Lambert, son of Mieszko I, or an unknown son of Bolesław I from his first marriage with the daughter of Rikdag, Margrave of Meissen.

It is possible that Bezprym was in Hungary and there he was appointed head of Veszprém and Zala county. In this case, the name "Veszprém" would have originated from his name. However, this hypothesis proposed by a Hungarian researcher has not found acceptance among Polish historians. It is also probable that Bezprym was present at the coronation of his father as King of Poland in Gniezno Cathedral on 25 April 1025.

== Accession ==
After Mieszko II took control over the government of Poland, both Bezprym and his youngest half-brother, Otto, probably resided in Poland for a short time. However, Mieszko II soon expelled Bezprym from the country. and probably did the same with Otto in 1030, when he discovered that they conspired against him with the help of Emperor Conrad II.

Bezprym took refuge in Kievan Rus' and probably used the weakened position of Mieszko II as an excuse to gain the alliance of the Rurikid rulers Yaroslav I the Wise and Mstislav. In 1031, while Mieszko II was defending the western border (Lusatia) from the German expedition of Conrad II, Bezprym and the Kievan forces entered into Poland, and Mieszko II was therefore unable to repel the Kievan attack. Mieszko II was then forced to escape to Bohemia, where he was imprisoned and castrated by orders of Duke Oldřich. Yaroslav I the Wise annexed Red Ruthenia to his domains and Bezprym ascended to the Polish throne. It has been postulated that Yaroslav I's troops intervened directly in the central provinces of Poland, aimed at embedding the new Duke on the throne, but this is now considered doubtful. It is possible that the new rule of Bezprym was attractive to the population. Some scholars assume that he may even have stood at the head of a pagan reaction.

== Reign ==
Shortly after taking power, Bezprym sent the Polish regalia to the Emperor. Thus, he resigned from the royal title and accepted the primacy of his western neighbour. The royal crown and regalia were personally delivered by Mieszko II's wife, Queen Richeza. In 1031, together with her children Casimir, Ryksa and Gertruda, she left the country. At the court of Emperor Conrad II, the deposed queen was received with all honours and was also allowed to continue to use her royal title. The departure of Richeza, and especially of her son, was extremely beneficial for Bezprym, because this eliminated (at least temporarily) a possible pretender to the throne. Mieszko II was not considered too dangerous at that time, since he was still imprisoned in Bohemia.

However, there probably remained a large group of supporters of the former ruler. It is believed that Bezprym started a bloody persecution against them shortly after he began his government. As a result, many representatives of the Polish social elite were forced to flee. According to sources, some of them took refuge in Masovia. Perhaps among the victims of the repression were two bishops, Roman and Lambert, whose date of death was recorded in 1032 in the Chronicles of the Chapter of Kraków. The brutal fight with the opposition could have led to the above-mentioned Pagan Reaction, but it was probably instigated by discontent against the power of the Church and the state apparatus. Contemporary historiography places these riots in 1031–1032, during the reign of Bezprym. The reaction was not only of a religious background, but also social. Mainly, it was a reflection of the economic situation caused by the aggressive policy of Bolesław I the Brave and the less successful rule of Mieszko II. The defeat in the battle in the west during that period cut off the basic source of livelihood of the Polish troops, who were forced to loot the western lands. As a result, the cost of maintaining the existence of an extensive army was probably too much for the population. In addition, the devastating incursions of foreign troops were another cause of dissatisfaction among the citizens.

It is noteworthy that one can find in older historiography the theory, currently generally rejected, of the existence of an older son of Mieszko II known as Bolesław the Forgotten (Polish: Bolesław Zapomniany) This Bolesław apparently succeeded his father in 1034 until his own death in 1038, and, according to some historians, was the real instigator of the Pagan Reaction.

== Death ==
The rule of Bezprym did not last long due to his extreme cruelty. According to the Chronicles of Hildesheim, he was murdered by his own men no later than the spring of 1032. Probably the instigators of his death were his half-brothers, although the main conspirator was thought to be Otto, who remained free in Germany. The place of his burial is unknown.

As a result of Bezprym's rule, the Polish state was substantially weakened. After his death, the country was divided into three parts, governed by Mieszko II, Otto, or their cousin Dytryk. This significantly increased the impact of the Holy Roman Empire on Polish affairs. Poland also lost its status as a kingdom for nearly a half century.

== Bibliography ==
- Oswald Balzer, Genealogia Piastów, Editorial Avalon, Kraków 2005 (first edition 1895), ISBN 83-918497-0-8.
- D. Borawska, Kryzys monarchii wczesnopiastowskiej w latach trzydziestych XI wieku, Warsaw 1964.
- Gallus Anonymus, Cronicae et gesta ducum sive principum Polonorum, translated by Roman Grodecki, introduction and development of Marian Plezia, Editorial Ossolineum, Wrocław 2003, pp. 36–37, 39–40, ISBN 83-04-04610-5.
- Z. Górczak, Bunt Bezpryma jako początek tzw. reakcji pogańskiej w Polsce [in:] Nihil superfluum esse, edited by J. Strzelczyka and J. Dobosza, Poznań 2000, pp. 111–121.
- A. F. Grabski, Bolesław Chrobry, Warsaw 1964.
- R. Grodecki, Bezprym [in:] Polski Słownik Biograficzny, vol. II, Kraków 1936, p. 2.
- R. Grodecki, S. Zachorowski, J. Dąbrowski, Dzieje Polski Średniowiecznej, vol. I, Editorial Platan, Kraków 1995 (first edition 1926), pp. 103–125, ISBN 83-7052-230-0.
- K. Jasiński, Rodowód pierwszych Piastów, Oficyna Volumen Editorial, 1993, pp. 105–107, ISBN 83-85218-32-7.
- G. Labuda, Mieszko II król Polski, Editorial Secesja, Kraków 1992, ISBN 83-85483-46-2.
- G. Labuda, Pierwsze państwo polskie, National Agency Editorial, Kraków 1989, ISBN 83-03-02969-X.
- S. Szczur, Historia Polski średniowiecze, Wydawnictwo Literackie 2002, pp. 75–81, ISBN 83-08-03272-9.

Bezprym Piast dynasty Born: c. 986 Died: 1032
Vacant Kingship of Mieszko II Lambert Title last held by Mieszko I	Duke of Poland; 1031 – 1032	Succeeded by Mieszko II Lambert
