= Mieszko II Lambert =

King of Poland (r. 1025–1031); Duke of Poland (r. 1032–1034)

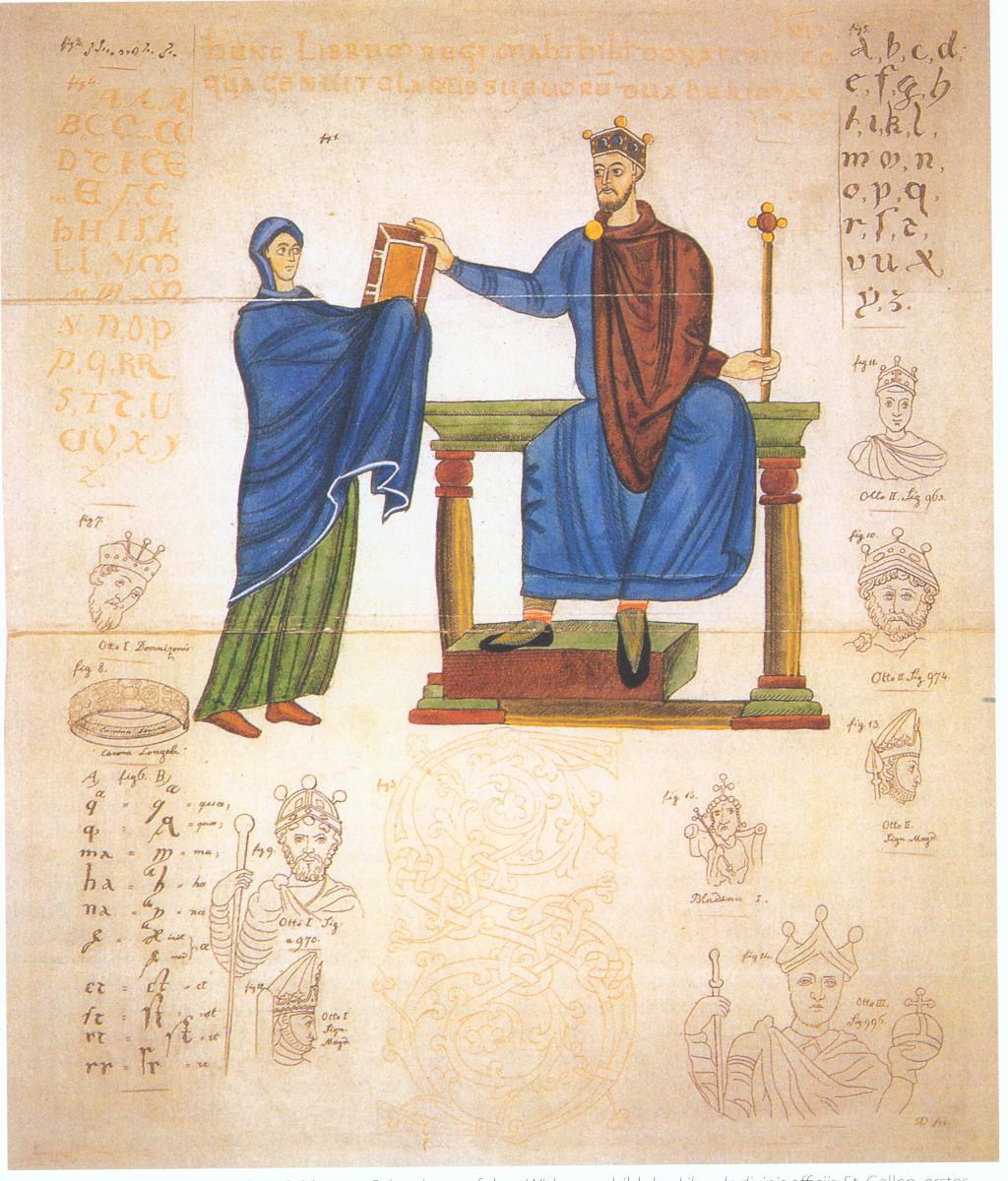
- Mieszko Lambert receiving a liturgical book from Matilda of Swabia, 1000–1025

King of Poland
- Reign: 1025 – 1031
- Coronation: 25 December 1025; Gniezno Cathedral
- Predecessor: Bolesław I the Brave
- Successor: Bezprym (as Duke of Poland)

Duke of Poland
- Reign: 1032 – 1034
- Predecessor: Otto Bolesławowic
- Successor: Casimir I the Restorer or Bolesław the Forgotten (disputed)
- Born: c. 990
- Died: 10 or 11 May 1034; Poznań (?)
- Burial: 10 or 11 May 1034
- Spouse: Richeza of Lotharingia
- Issue: Richeza, Queen of Hungary; Casimir I, Duke of Poland; Gertruda, Grand Princess of Kiev; Bolesław the Forgotten (possibly)
- Dynasty: Piast
- Father: Bolesław I the Brave
- Mother: Emnilda of Lusatia
- Religion: Chalcedonian Christianity

Mieszko II Lambert (Polish pronunciation: [ˈmjɛʂkɔ ˈdruɡʲi ˈlambɛrt]; c. 990 – 10/11 May 1034) was King of Poland from 1025 to 1031 and Duke from 1032 until his death.

He was the second son of Bolesław I the Brave but the eldest born from his third wife, Emnilda of Lusatia. He organized two devastating invasions of Saxony in 1028 and 1030. Then, he ran a defensive war against Germany, Bohemia and the Kievan princes. Mieszko II was forced to escape from the country in 1031 after an attack by Yaroslav I the Wise, who installed Mieszko's older half-brother Bezprym on the Polish throne. Mieszko II took refuge in Bohemia, where he was imprisoned by Duke Oldrich. In 1032, he regained power in one of Poland's three districts, then united the country, making good use of the remaining power structures. At this time, several Polish territorial acquisitions of his father were lost: Upper Lusatia (also known as Milsko), part of Lower Lusatia, Red Ruthenia, the western and central parts of Upper Hungary (now Slovakia) and probably Moravia.

Mieszko II was very well educated for the period. He was able to read and write and knew both Greek and Latin. He is unjustly known as Mieszko II Gnuśny (the "Lazy", "Stagnant" or "Slothful"). He received that epithet due to the unfortunate way his reign ended, but in the beginning, he acted as a skillful and talented ruler.

== Early years ==
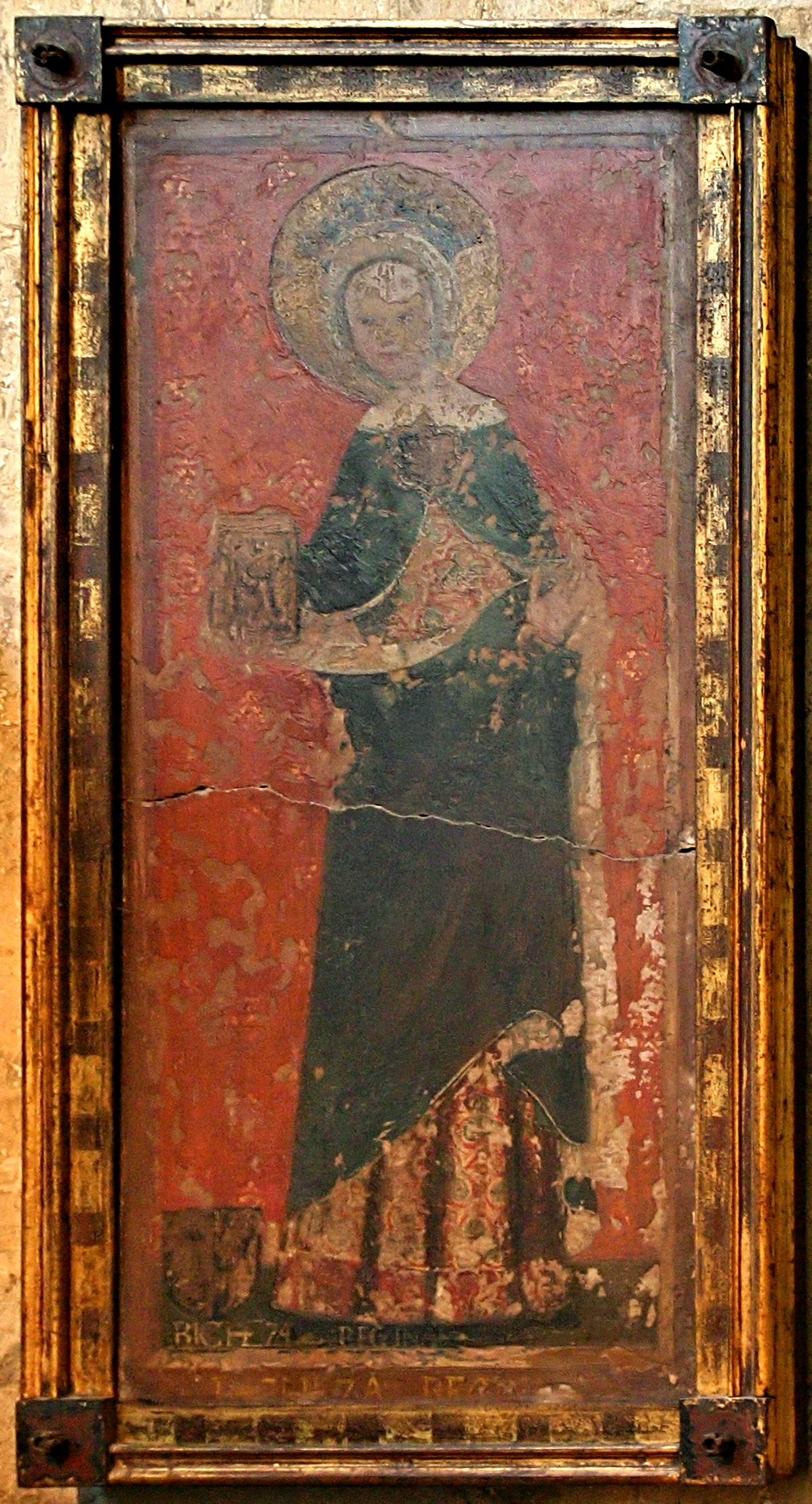
Richeza of Lotharingia, the niece of Emperor Otto III and Mieszko Lambert's consort

Mieszko was a son of King Bolesław the Brave. He was probably named after his paternal grandfather, Mieszko I. His second name, Lambert, sometimes erroneously considered to be a sobriquet, was given to him as a reference to Saint Lambert. However, it is also probable that the name was chosen after Bolesław's half-brother Lambert Mieszkowic. It is thought that the choice of this name for his son was an expression of warming relations between Bolesław I and his stepmother Oda of Haldensleben.

Since Mieszko II was politically active before his father's death, Bolesław appointed him as his successor. He participated mainly in German politics, both as a representative of his father and the commander of the Polish troops.

In 1013, Mieszko II went to Magdeburg, where he paid homage to Emperor Henry II. A few months later, Bolesław I paid homage in person. The real purpose of Mieszko II's visit is unclear, especially since soon afterwards, his father paid homage to the Holy Roman Empire. Presumably, the young prince paid homage to Milsko, Lusatia and Moravia. The relevant treaty stipulated that it was only a personal tribute, not entailing any legal obligations. Another hypothesis assumes that the territories were transferred by Bolesław to him, and as a result, made Mieszko II a vassal of the Empire.

The position of the young prince, at both the Polish and Imperial courts, became stronger in 1013 when he married Richeza, daughter of Count Palatine Ezzo of Lotharingia and niece of Emperor Otto III. Ezzo was a prince of considerable influence as a great leader of the opposition against Henry II. Through marriage with his daughter, Mieszko II entered the circle of the Imperial family. Probably after the wedding, and in accordance with prevailing custom, Bolesław I the Brave gave a separate district to Mieszko II to rule: Kraków. One of his towns, Wawel (now part of the city), was chosen by the prince as his residence.

In the year 1014, Mieszko II was sent by his father to Bohemia as an emissary. He had to persuade Duke Oldřich to make an alliance against Emperor Henry II. The mission failed as Oldřich imprisoned Mieszko II. He was released only after the intervention of the Emperor, who, despite the planned betrayal of Bolesław I, loyally acted on behalf of his vassal. As a result, Mieszko II was sent to the Imperial court in Merseburg as a hostage. Henry II probably wanted to force the presence of Bolesław I in Merseburg and make him explain his actions. The plan failed, however, because, under pressure from his relatives, the Emperor soon agreed to release Mieszko II.

A year later, Mieszko II stood at the head of Polish troops in the next war against the Emperor. The campaign was not favorable to Henry. His army needed over a month to reach the line of the Oder River, and once there, his troops encountered strong resistance led by Mieszko II and his father. Henry II sent a delegation to the Polish rulers in an effort to induce them to conclude a peace settlement. Mieszko II refused, and after the Emperor's failure to defeat his troops in battle, Henry decided to begin retreating to Dziadoszyce. The Polish prince went in pursuit and inflicted heavy losses on the German army. When the Polish army advanced to Meissen, Mieszko II unsuccessfully tried to besiege the castle of his brother-in-law, Margrave Herman I (husband of his sister Regelinda). The fighting stopped in autumn and was resumed only in 1017 after the failure of peace talks. Imperial forces bypassed the main defensive site near Krosno Odrzańskie and besieged Niemcza. At the same time, at the head of ten legions, Mieszko II went to Moravia and planned an allied attack together with Bohemia against the Emperor. This action forced the Emperor to give up on any plan of a frontal attack. A year later, the Peace of Bautzen (30 January 1018) was concluded, with terms extremely favorable to the Polish side.

Beginning in 1028, Mieszko II successfully waged war against the Holy Roman Empire. He was able to repel its invading army, and later even invaded Saxony. He allied Poland with Hungary, resulting in a temporary Hungarian occupation of Vienna. This war was probably prompted by family connections of Mieszko II's in Germany, who opposed Emperor Conrad II.

Due to the death of Thietmar of Merseburg, the principal chronicler of that period, there is little information about Mieszko II's life from 1018 until 1025, when he finally took over the government of Poland. Only Gallus Anonymus mentions the then Prince on the occasion of the description of his father's trip to Rus in 1018: "due to the fact that his son (...) Mieszko wasn't considered yet capable of taking the government by himself, he established a regent among his family during his trip to Rus". This statement was probably the result of the complete ignorance of the chronicler, since in 1018, Mieszko II was 28 years old and was already fully able to exercise power by himself.

== Kingship ==
=== Accession ===
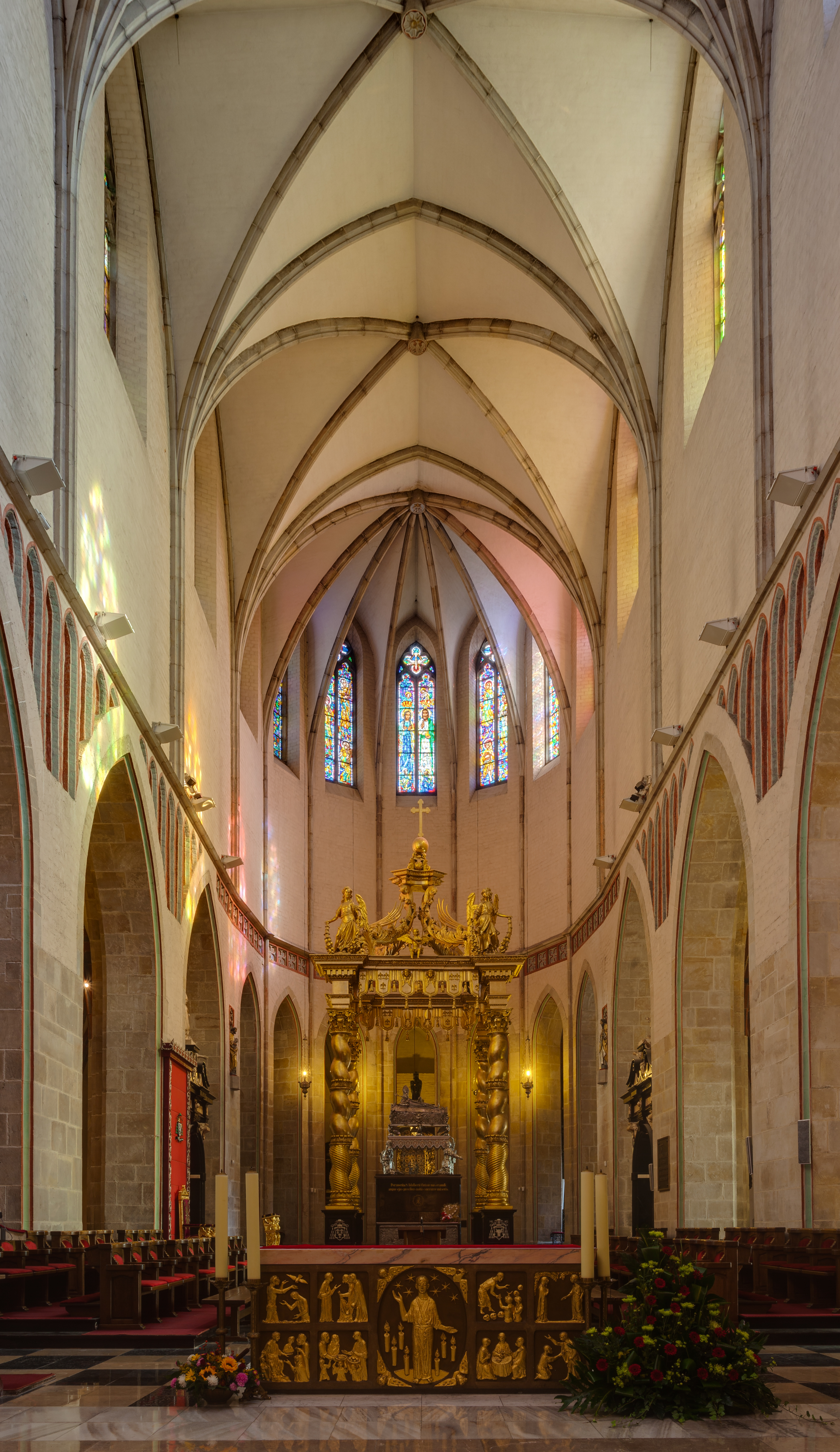
Gniezno Cathedral, where Mieszko Lambert was crowned King of Poland in 1025.

King Bolesław died on 17 June 1025. Six months later, on Christmas Day, Mieszko II Lambert was crowned king of Poland by the archbishop of Gniezno, Hipolit, in the Gniezno Cathedral. Contemporary German chroniclers considered this to be an abuse of power on the part of the Archbishop, which was made necessary by the existing political situation. After his father's death, Mieszko II inherited a vast territory, which in addition to Greater Poland, Lesser Poland, Silesia and Gdańsk Pomerania, also included Lusatia, Red Ruthenia and the territory of present-day Slovakia. Whether Moravia was still under his reign or was lost earlier is disputed. Once his solo reign had begun, as an important Central European ruler, he was now very important to the Holy Roman Empire.

Later developments during his reign had their source in dynastic and familial issues. His older half-brother Bezprym was the son of the Hungarian princess Judith, Bolesław's second wife. Mieszko II also had a younger full-brother, Otto. According to Slavic custom, a father was expected to divide his legacy among all his sons. However, since Bolesław I did not wish to break up the kingdom, Mieszko II's brothers received nothing from their father's legacy.

As Bezprym was the oldest son, there were some who felt that he should have succeeded his father as king. Bezprym had, however, always been disliked by his father, as indicated by his name (the Piasts tended to give names such as Bolesław, Mieszko and later Kazimierz, Władysław and emperors' names, such as Otto, Konrad (Conrad), and Henryk (Heinrich). Bezprym was rather a commoner's name, which implied that Bolesław did not wish Bezprym to succeed him). For that reason, Bezprym was sent to a monastery.

According to some chroniclers, Mieszko II expelled his two brothers from the country. Otto took refuge in Germany and Bezprym escaped to the Kievan Rus'.

=== Role in German conflict ===
In 1026, King Conrad II of Germany went to Italy for his Imperial coronation. His absence increased the activity of the opposition centered around Dukes Ernest II of Swabia and Frederick II of Upper Lorraine. Conrad II's opponents conspired to acquire Mieszko's favor. Historical evidence of these efforts is in the prayer book sent to Mieszko by Frederick's wife, Matilda of Swabia, around 1027. The volume is entitled: officiorum Liber quem ordinem Romanum apellant. In it, a miniature showed the Duchess presenting the Book to Mieszko II while sitting on a throne. The gift was accompanied by a letter, wherein Matilda named him a distinguished king and a model for the spread of Christianity. Also written was praise of the merits of Mieszko II in the building of new churches, as well as his knowledge of Latin, very unusual in those times when Greek was more widely used. In this book are found the earliest records of the Kingdom of Poland: neumes at the margins of the sequence Ad célèbres rex celica. The gift caused the expected effect, and Mieszko II promised to take military action. The preparations for the war began in the autumn of 1027. In the middle of that year, Conrad II returned to Germany and began to fight the rebels. Soon, he defeated Duke Ernest II, depriving him of his lands. Only when the rebel fight was nearly lost did Mieszko II arrive to their aid. In 1028, Polish troops invaded Saxony and took a number of prisoners. The devastation was so great that, according to Saxon sources, "where Mieszko II's troops put their feet, grass never thence grew". The Emperor accused the Polish ruler of an illegal coronation as King and declared him a usurper. This invasion involved the lands of the Lutici tribe. In October 1028, the Emperor's opportunity came as the Lutici district of Pöhlde asked the Emperor to defend against the attacks of Mieszko II, promising support in the fight against the Polish ruler.

=== Retaliatory expeditions ===
Despite the treaty that secured peace between Poland and Germany, the Emperor soon armed a retaliatory expedition against Mieszko II. Conrad II's army arrived in Lusatia in the autumn of 1029 and began the siege of Bautzen, but the German troops did not receive the promised support of the Lutici tribe and the expedition failed. Threatened by the Hungarians, the Emperor was forced to retreat.

Probably in this same year, the son of Oldřich, Bretislaus I, attacked and took Moravia.

In 1030, Mieszko II secured an alliance with Hungary and once again invaded Saxony. In the meanwhile, his southern ally attacked Bavaria and temporarily occupied Vienna.

In response, the Emperor organised another expedition against the Polish king, this time by organising a coalition against Mieszko II. Already in 1030, Yaroslav I the Wise began the offensive and conquered Red Ruthenia and some Bełz castles.

In 1031, the Emperor concluded a peace with the Kingdom of Hungary. Probably in exchange for Stephen I's support, Conrad II ceded to Hungary the territories between the Leitha and Fischa Rivers. Now that the Emperor was less concerned about an attack from the south, in the autumn of 1031, he went on the offensive against Poland and besieged Milsko. The offensive ended with a complete success, and Mieszko II was forced to surrender some lands. As a result, the Polish King lost portions of the lands taken by his father, who often warred against Emperor Henry II.

== Deposition and division ==
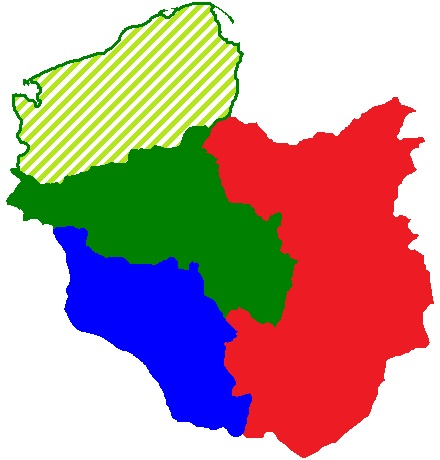
Division of Poland between Mieszko Lambert (red) and his brothers Otto Bolesławowic (blue) and Dytryk (green) following the Treaty of Merseburg in 1032.

Historians estimate that the reason for the rapid capitulation of Mieszko II was the bad internal situation in the country. Bolesław left an unstable kingdom to his son, who had to defend his autonomy and position amongst neighboring rulers. Also, the cost of Mieszko II's extensive war against Emperor Conrad II caused his popularity to decline among his subjects, despite the fact that during the invasion of Saxony, the King only defended their territory. Furthermore, the final loss of the war against the Holy Roman Empire weakened the position of the King, who had to face several rebellions from the opposition, who claimed that the previous war did not produce the expected benefits. An additional problem was a dynastic crisis: Mieszko II's brothers continued their attempts to gain power with the help of foreign forces.

The brother who caused the first problems for Mieszko II was most likely Bezprym, who allegedly won the alliance of Kiev in order to take power with the support of Otto. When Mieszko II was busy defending Lusatia from the troops of Conrad II, the Kievan expedition came from the east with Yaroslav I the Wise as the leader. In 1031, Poland was invaded and then Bezprym was settled on the throne. Mieszko II and his family were forced to flee the country. Queen Richeza and her children found refuge in Germany. The King could not escape to Hungary because, during his travel, he was stopped by Rus' troops. King Stephen I of Hungary was not favorable to accepting him in his country. Without alternatives, Mieszko II went to Bohemia. Duke Oldřich once again imprisoned him. This time, the King could not count on Imperial support. Mieszko II was not only imprisoned but also castrated, which was to be a punishment to Bolesław I the Brave, who blinded Duke Boleslaus III the Red (Oldřich's brother) thirty years before. Mieszko II and his wife never reunited again; according to some sources, they were either officially divorced or only separated.

Bezprym probably made bloody persecutions against the followers of Mieszko II. At the time, power was exercised in the face of mutiny by the people, an event known as the "Pagan Reaction". Having degraded the structure of power, the Duke's authority collapsed, and he was forced to send the Polish regalia to the Emperor. After only one year of reign, Bezprym was murdered (1032), probably at the instigation of his brothers.

After the death of Bezprym, the Polish throne remained vacant. Mieszko II was still imprisoned in Bohemia and Otto was probably in Germany. German sources report that the Emperor organized an expedition in order to invade Poland. It is unknown what happened after this, but certainly Mieszko II was released by Duke Oldřich and he could return to the country. After his recent opponent had regained power, the Emperor immediately reacted and began the preparations for the expedition against Poland. Mieszko II was not prepared for the confrontation, so he used his influence in the German court in order to resolve the conflict.

On 7 July 1032, in Merseburg, a meeting took place between Conrad II and the surviving heirs of the Piast dynasty. Without alternatives, Mieszko II was forced to surrender the crown and agreed to the division of Poland between him and the other two competitors: his brother Otto and a certain Dytryk (German: Thiedric) — his cousin, grandson of Duke Mieszko I and his third wife, Oda von Haldensleben. Mieszko II probably received Lesser Poland and Masovia, Otto obtained Silesia, and Dytryk took Greater Poland. According to another hypothesis, Mieszko II received Greater Poland, and other neighborhoods were given to Otto and Dytryk. Although the distribution was uncertain, this division was short-lived: in 1033, Otto was killed by one of his own men, and Mieszko II took his domains. Shortly afterwards, he likely had Dytryk expelled and thus was able to reunite the whole country in his hands. Mieszko II regained full power, but he still had to fight against the nobility and his own subjects. In Poland, his renunciation of the crown was disregarded, and after 1032, he was still called king in the chronicles.

== Death ==
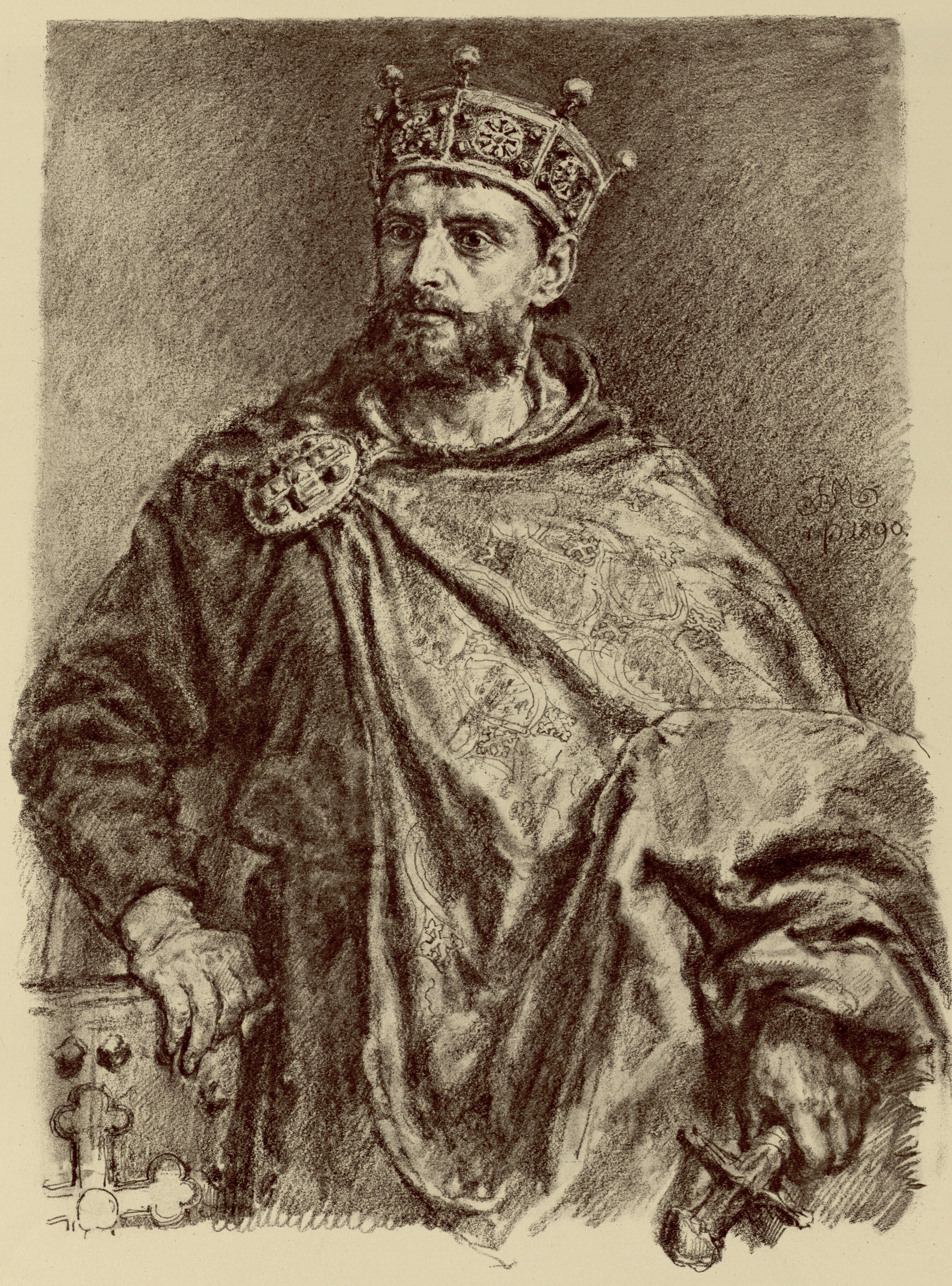
Mieszko II Lambert, a 19th century depiction by Jan Matejko based on historical sources

Mieszko II died suddenly on either 10 or 11 May 1034, probably in Poznań. The Polish chronicles clearly stated that he died of natural causes; the information given by the chronicles of Godfrey of Viterbo that he was murdered by the sword-bearer (Miecznik) refers in fact to Bezprym. He was buried in the Cathedral of St. Peter and St. Paul.

After Mieszko II's death, Poland's peasants revolted in a "pagan reaction". The exact reasons and date are unknown. Mieszko II's only son and heir, Casimir I the Restorer, was either expelled by this insurrection, or the insurrection was caused by the aristocracy's expulsion of him. Some modern historians argue that the insurrection was caused more by economic than by religious issues, such as new taxes for the Church and the militarization of the early Polish polity. Priests, monks and knights were killed; cities, churches and monasteries were burned. The chaos became still greater when, unexpectedly, the Czechs invaded Silesia and Greater Poland from the south (1039). The land became divided among local rulers, one of whom is known by name: Miecław, ruler of Mazovia. Greater Poland was so devastated that it ceased to be the core of the Polish Kingdom. The capital was moved to Kraków, in Lesser Poland.

== Marriage and issue ==
In Merseburg ca. 1013, Mieszko II married Richeza, daughter of Count Palatine Ezzo, Count Palatine of Lotharingia and Matilda of Germany, Countess Palatine of Lotharingia. They had:

1. Richeza (b. 22 September 1013 – d. 21 May 1075), married by 1039/42 to King Béla I of Hungary
2. Casimir I the Restorer (b. 25 July 1016 – d. 19 March 1058)
3. Gertruda (b. 1025 – d. Kiev, 4 January 1108), married by 1043 to Grand Prince Iziaslav I of Kiev
4. possibly Agatha, wife of Edward the Exile, whose origins are unknown. One theory that has been put forward is that she was the daughter of Mieszko II and Richeza.

== See also ==
- History of Poland (966–1385)

== Bibliography ==
- Davies, Norman (1986). Heart of Europe: A Short History of Poland. Oxford University Press.
- Wilson, Peter H. (2016). Heart of Europe. Harvard University Press.

Mieszko II Lambert Piast Dynasty Born: c. 990 Died: 10 or 11 May 1034
Regnal titles
Preceded by Bolesław I the Brave	King of Poland; 1025 – 1031	Vacant Title next held by Bolesław II the Generous
Preceded by Bezprym	Duke of Poland; 1032 – 1034	Succeeded by Casimir I the Restorer

Media related to Mieszko II of Poland at Wikimedia Commons
