= Kamieniec, Gostynin County =

Kamieniec
- Village
- Location within Poland
- Coordinates: 52°17′30″N 19°36′11″E
- Country: Poland
- Voivodeship: Masovian
- County: Gostynin
- Gmina: Szczawin Kościelny
- Time zone: UTC+1 (CET)
  - Summer (DST): UTC+2 (CEST)

Kamieniec [kaˈmjɛɲɛt͡s] is a village in the administrative district of Gmina Szczawin Kościelny, within Gostynin County, Masovian Voivodeship, in central Poland.
