= Piast dynasty =

First ruling dynasty of Poland (960–1370)

Piast
- Country: Duchy/Kingdom of Poland; Duchies of Masovia; Duchies of Silesia; Duchy of Bohemia; Galicia–Volhynia
- Founded: c. 9th century
- Founder: Piast the Wheelwright (mythical or legendary); Mieszko I of Poland (historical)
- Final ruler: Casimir III the Great (Kingdom of Poland); Yuri II Boleslav (Galicia-Volhynia); Janusz III (Masovia); George IV William of Legnica (Silesia)
- Titles: Duke of the Polans (c. 9th century – 966); Duke of Poland (966–1025, 1031–1076, 1082–1138); King of Poland (1025–1031, 1076–1082, 1295–1296, 1320–1370); High Duke of Poland (1138-1227); Duke of Kraków (1227–1291, 1306–1320); Duke of Bohemia (1003–1004); Duke of Galicia-Volhynia (1325–1340); Duke of Silesia (1138–1675); Duke of Masovia (1138–1526); Duke of Greater Poland (1138–1295); Duke of Kuyavia (1233–1364); Duke of Sandomierz; Duke of Sieradz-Łęczyca
- Dissolution: 1388; 638 years ago (outside Silesia and Masovia); 1675; 351 years ago (male); 1707; 319 years ago (female)
- Branches: Silesian Piasts, the agnatically senior and later last surviving branch of the dynasty; Masovian Piasts (dissolved in 1526); House of Griffin (uncertain)

The House of Piast (Polish: Piastowie) was the first historical ruling dynasty of Poland. The first documented Polish monarch was Duke Mieszko I (c. 960–992). The Piasts' royal rule in Poland ended in 1370 with the death of King Casimir III the Great.

Branches of the Piast dynasty continued to rule in the Duchy of Masovia (until 1526) and in the Duchies of Silesia until the last male Silesian Piast died in 1675. The Piasts intermarried with several noble lines of Europe, and possessed numerous titles, some within the Holy Roman Empire. The Jagiellonian kings ruling after the death of Casimir IV of Poland were also descended in the female line from Casimir III's daughter.

== Origin of the name ==
The early dukes and kings of Poland are said to have regarded themselves as descendants of the semi-legendary Piast the Wheelwright (Piast Kołodziej), first mentioned in the Cronicae et gesta ducum sive principum Polonorum (Deeds of the Princes of the Poles), written c. 1113 by Gallus Anonymus. However, the term "Piast Dynasty" was not applied until the 17th century. In a historical work, the expression Piast dynasty was introduced by the Polish historian Adam Naruszewicz; it is not documented in contemporary sources.

== History ==
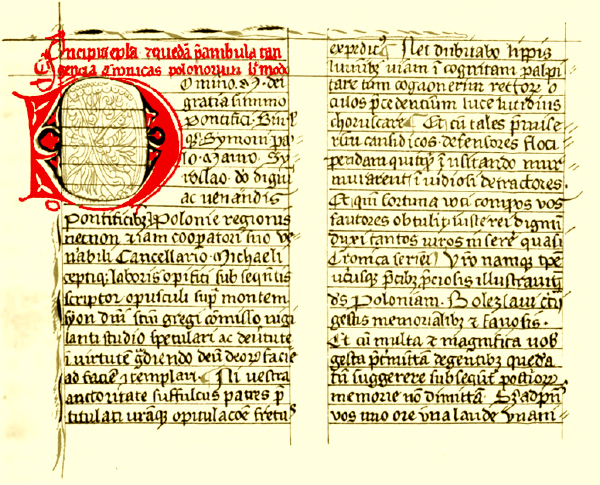
Deeds of the Princes of the Poles

The first "Piasts", probably of Polan descent, appeared around 940 in the territory of Greater Poland at the stronghold of Giecz. Shortly afterwards they relocated their residence to Gniezno, where Prince Mieszko I ruled over the Civitas Schinesghe from about 960. The Piasts temporarily also ruled over Pomerania, Bohemia and the Lusatias, as well as part of Ruthenia, and the Hungarian Spiš region in present-day Slovakia. The ruler bore the title of a duke or a king, depending on their position of power.

The Polish monarchy had to deal with the expansionist policies of the Holy Roman Empire in the west, resulting in a chequered co-existence, with Piast rulers like Mieszko I, Casimir I the Restorer or Władysław I Herman trying to protect the Polish state by treaties, oath of allegiances and marriage alliances with the Imperial Ottonian and Salian dynasties. The Bohemian Přemyslid dynasty, the Hungarian Arpads and their Anjou successors, the Kievan Rus', later also the State of the Teutonic Order and the Grand Duchy of Lithuania were mighty neighbours.

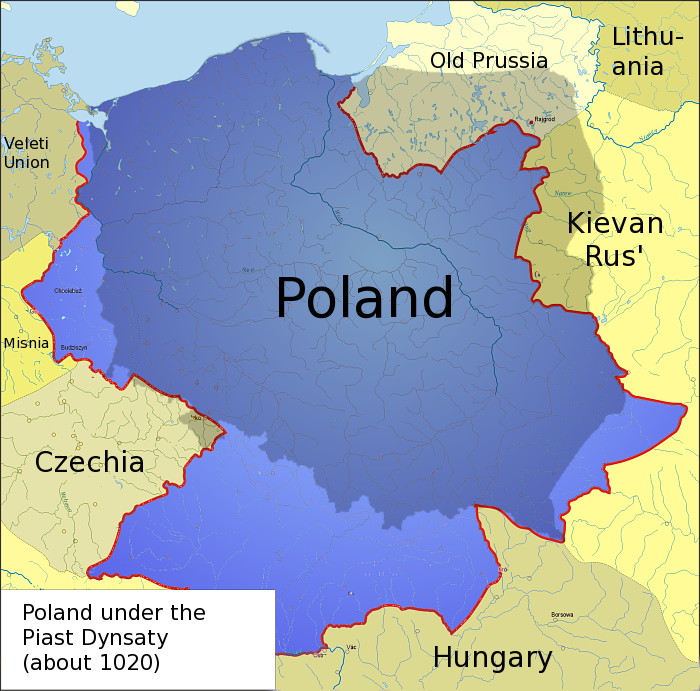
Lands held by the Piast dynasty (992–1025), with a shaded area corresponding to the territory of present-day Poland

The Piast position was decisively enfeebled by an era of fragmentation following the 1138 Testament of Bolesław III Wrymouth. For nearly 150 years, the Polish state shattered into several duchies, with the Piast duke against the formally valid principle of agnatic seniority fighting for the throne at Kraków, the capital of the Lesser Polish Seniorate Province. Numerous dukes like Mieszko III the Old, Władysław III Spindleshanks or Leszek I the White were crowned, only to be overthrown shortly afterwards, and others restored and ousted, at times repeatedly. The senior branch of the Silesian Piasts, descendants of Bolesław III Wrymouth's eldest son Duke Władysław II the Exile, went separate ways and since the 14th century were vassals of the Bohemian Crown.

After the Polish royal line and Piast junior branch had died out in 1370, the Polish crown fell to the Anjou king Louis I of Hungary, son of late King Casimir's sister Elizabeth Piast. The Masovian branch of the Piasts became extinct with the death of Duke Janusz III in 1526. The last ruling duke of the Silesian Piasts was George William of Legnica who died in 1675. His uncle Count August of Legnica, the last male Piast, died in 1679. The last legitimate heir, Duchess Karolina of Legnica-Brieg died in 1707 and is buried in Trzebnica Abbey. Nevertheless, numerous families, like the illegitimate descendants of the Silesian duke Adam Wenceslaus of Cieszyn (1574–1617), link their genealogy to the dynasty.

== Coat of arms ==
About 1295, Przemysł II used a coat of arms with a white eagle – a symbol later referred to as the Piast coat of arms or as the Piast Eagle. The Silesian Piasts in the 14th century used an eagle modified by a crescent, which became the coat of arms of the Duchy of Silesia.

== Piast rulers ==
Piast kings and rulers of Poland appear in list form in the following table. For a list of all rulers, see List of Polish monarchs.

=== Legendary dukes of the Polans ===
Name	Lifespan	Reign start	Reign end	Notes	Family	Image
Chościsko: Latin: Semovit filius Past Ckosisconis, Pazt filius Chosisconisu; Duke	7th century	7th century	8th century	A legendary member of the Polans tribe	Polans (Tribe)	
Piast the Wheelwright: Polish: Piast Kołodziej Latin: Past Ckosisconis, Pazt filius Chosisconisu; Duke	8th century	8th century	9th century	A legendary ruler of the Polans; Son of Chościsko, father of Siemowit; Founder of the Piast dynasty	Piast	
Siemowit: Ziemowit; Duke	9th century	9th century	9th century	A semi-legendary ruler of the Polans, son of Piast the Wheelwright and Rzepicha	Piast	
Lestek: Leszek, Lestko; Duke	9th / 10th centuries	9th / 10th centuries	9th / 10th centuries	A semi-legendary ruler of the Polans, son of Siemowit	Piast	
Siemomysł: Ziemomysł; Duke	10th century	10th century	10th century	A semi-legendary ruler of the Polans, son of Lestek	Piast	

=== Dukes and Kings of Poland ===
Name	Lifespan	Reign start	Reign end	Notes	Family	Image
Mieszko I of Poland: Duke	ca. 940 – 25 May 992	ca. 960	992	Son of Siemomysł; First Christian monarch Misico, dux Wandalorum	Piast	
Bolesław I the Brave: Bolesław I the Great Polish: Bolesław I Chrobry (Wielki); King of Poland King	967 – 17 June 1025	Duke: 992; King: 18 April 1025	Duke: 18 April 1025; King: 17 June 1025	Son of Mieszko I and Dobrawa of Bohemia; First to be crowned King; Regnum Sclavorum, Gothorum sive Polonorum	Piast	
Mieszko II Lambert: King of Poland King	ca. 990 – 10/11 May 1034	1025	1031	Son of Bolesław I and Emnilda of Lusatia	Piast	
Bezprym: Duke	ca. 986 – 1032	1031	1032	Son of Bolesław I and Judith of Hungary (disputed)	Piast	
Otto Bolesławowic: Duke	1000–1033	1032	1032	Son of Bolesław I and Emnilda	Piast	
Theodorick: Dytryk; Duke	after 992 – after 1032	1032	1032 /1033	Grandson of Mieszko I and Oda of Haldensleben	Piast	
Mieszko II Lambert: Duke	ca. 990 – 10/11 May 1034	1032	1034	Restored	Piast	
Bolesław the Forgotten: Polish: Bolesław Zapomniany; Duke	before 1016 – 1038 or 1039	1034	1038 /1039	Semi-legendary, existence disputed	Piast	
Casimir I the Restorer: Polish: Kazimierz I Odnowiciel; Duke	25 June 1016 – 28 November 1058 (aged 42)	1039	1058	Son of Mieszko II and Richeza of Lotharingia	Piast	
Bolesław II the Bold: Polish: Bolesław II Szczodry / Śmiały; King of Poland King	ca. 1041 or 1042 – 2 or 3 April 1081 or 1082	Duke: 1058; King: 1076	Duke: 1076; King: 1079	Son of Kazimierz I and Maria Dobroniega of Kiev	Piast	
Władysław I Herman: Duke	ca. 1044 – 4 June 1102	1079	1102	Son of Kazimierz I and Maria Dobroniega	Piast	
Zbigniew: Zbygniew; Duke	ca. 1073 – 8 July 1113	1102	1107	Son of Władysław I and Przecława of Prawdzic coat of arms (disputed); First jointly with Władysław I 1098–1102	Piast	
Bolesław III Wrymouth: Polish: Bolesław III Krzywousty; Duke	20 August 1086 – 28 October 1138 (aged 52)	1107	1138	Son of Władysław I and Judith of Bohemia; First jointly with Władysław 1098–1102; Introduced senioral principle	Piast	

=== High Dukes of Poland (Fragmentation of the Kingdom) ===
Name	Lifespan	Reign start	Reign end	Notes	Family	Image
Władysław II the Exile: Polish: Władysław II Wygnaniec; High Duke Supreme Prince	1105 – 30 May 1159	1138	1146	Son of Bolesław III and Zbyslava of Kiev; Also Duke of Silesia; Exiled by his brothers	Piast	
Bolesław IV the Curly: Polish: Bolesław Kędzierzawy; High Duke Supreme Prince	ca. 1125 – 5 January 1173	1146	1173	Son of Bolesław III and Salomea of Berg; Also Duke of Masovia	Piast	
Mieszko III the Old: Polish: Mieszko III Stary; High Duke Supreme Prince	ca. 1127 – 13 March 1202	1173	1177	Son of Bolesław III and Salomea; Also Duke of Greater Poland	Piast	
Casimir II the Just: Polish: Kazimierz II Sprawiedliwy; High Duke Supreme Prince	ca. 1138 – 5 May 1194	1177	1190	Son of Bolesław III and Salomea; Also Duke of Wiślica and Sandomierz	Piast	
Mieszko III the Old: Polish: Mieszko III Stary; High Duke Supreme Prince	ca. 1127 – 13 March 1202	1190	1190	Restored	Piast	
Casimir II the Just: Polish: Kazimierz II Sprawiedliwy; High Duke Supreme Prince	ca. 1138 – 5 May 1194	1190	1194	Restored	Piast	
Leszek I the White: Polish: Leszek Biały; High Duke Supreme Prince	ca. 1186 – 24 November 1227	1194	1198	Son of Casimir II and Helen of Znojmo; Also Duke of Sandomierz	Piast	
Mieszko III the Old: Polish: Mieszko III Stary; High Duke Supreme Prince	ca. 1127 – 13 March 1202	1198	1199	Restored	Piast	
Leszek I the White: Polish: Leszek Biały; High Duke Supreme Prince	ca. 1186 – 24 November 1227	1199	1199	Restored	Piast	
Mieszko III the Old: Polish: Mieszko III Stary; High Duke Supreme Prince	ca. 1127 – 13 March 1202	1199	1202	Restored	Piast	
Władysław III Spindleshanks: Polish: Władysław III Laskonogi; High Duke Supreme Prince	ca. 1161/66 – 3 November 1231	1202	1202	Son of Mieszko III and Eudoxia of Kiev; Also Duke of Greater Poland	Piast	
Leszek I the White: Polish: Leszek Biały; High Duke Supreme Prince	ca. 1186 – 24 November 1227	1202	1210	Restored	Piast	
Mieszko IV Tanglefoot: Polish: Mieszko I Plątonogi; High Duke Supreme Prince	ca. 1130 – 16 May 1211	1210	1211	Son of Władysław II and Agnes of Babenberg; Also Duke of Silesia	Piast	
Leszek I the White: Polish: Leszek Biały; High Duke Supreme Prince	ca. 1186 – 24 November 1227	1211	1225	Restored	Piast	
Henryk I the Bearded: Polish: Henryk I Brodaty; High Duke Supreme Prince	ca. 1165 – 19 March 1238	1225	1225	Grandson of Władysław II, son of Bolesław I the Tall and Krystyna; Also Duke of Silesia	Piast	
Leszek I the White: Polish: Leszek Biały; High Duke Supreme Prince	ca. 1186 – 24 November 1227	1225	1227	Restored; Assassinated	Piast	
Władysław III Spindleshanks: Polish: Władysław III Laskonogi; High Duke Supreme Prince	ca. 1161/66 – 3 November 1231	1227	1229	Restored	Piast	
Konrad I of Masovia: Polish: Konrad I Mazowiecki; High Duke Supreme Prince	ca. 1187/88 – 31 August 1247	1229	1232	Son of Kazimierz II and Helen of Znojmo; Also Duke of Masovia	Piast	
Henryk I the Bearded: Polish: Henryk I Brodaty; High Duke Supreme Prince	ca. 1165 – 19 March 1238	1232	1238	Restored	Piast	
Henryk II the Pious: Polish: Henryk II Pobożny; High Duke Supreme Prince	ca. 1196 – 9 April 1241	1238	1241	Son of Henry I and Saint Hedwig of Andechs (Saint Hedwig of Silesia); Also Duke of Wroclaw and Greater Poland; Fell at Battle of Legnica	Piast	
Bolesław II Rogatka: Bolesław II the Horned; High Duke Supreme Prince	ca. 1220 – 1225	1241	1241	Son of Henry II and Anne of Bohemia; Also Duke of Silesia	Piast	
Konrad I of Masovia: Polish: Konrad I Mazowiecki; High Duke Supreme Prince	ca. 1187/88 – 31 August 1247	1241	1243	Restored	Piast	
Bolesław V the Chaste: Polish: Bolesław Wstydliwy; High Duke Supreme Prince	21 June 1226 – 7 December 1279	1243	1279	Son of Leszek the White and Grzymislawa of Luck	Piast	
Leszek II the Black: Polish: Leszek Czarny; High Duke Supreme Prince	ca. 1241 – 30 September 1288	1279	1288	Paternal grandson of Konrad I of Masovia; Maternal grandson of Henry II; Son of Casimir I of Kuyavia and Constance of Wrocław	Piast	
Bolesław II of Masovia: Boleslaw II of Płock; High Duke Supreme Prince	ca. 1251 – 20 April 1313	1288	1288	Grandson of Konrad I of Masovia; Duke of Masovia	Piast	
Henryk IV Probus: Polish: Henryk IV Prawy; High Duke Supreme Prince	ca. 1257/58 – 23 June 1290	1288	1289	Paternal grandson of Henryk II; Maternal grandson of Konrad I Son of Henry III the White and Judyta of Masovia; Duke of Lower Silesia	Piast	
Bolesław II of Masovia: Boleslaw II of Płock; High Duke Supreme Prince	ca. 1251 – 20 April 1313	1289	1289	Restored	Piast	
Władysław I the Elbow-high: Polish: Władysław I Łokietek; High Duke Supreme Prince	1261 – 2 March 1333	1289	1289	Grandson of Konrad I of Masovia; Son of Kazimierz I of Kujawia and Euphrosyne of Opole	Piast	
Henryk IV Probus: Polish: Henryk IV Prawy; High Duke Supreme Prince	ca. 1257/58 – 23 June 1290	1289	1290	Restored	Piast	

=== Kings of Poland (Reunification attempts) ===
Name	Lifespan	Reign start	Reign end	Notes	Family	Image
Przemysł II: Premyslas, Premislaus; King of Poland King	14 October 1257 – 8 February 1296 (aged 38)	High Duke: 1290; King: 1295	High Duke: 1291; King: 1296	Grandson of Henryk II; Son of Przemysł I and Elisabeth of Wrocław; Also Duke of Poznań, Greater Poland and Pomerania	Piast	r

=== Kings of Poland (Reunited Kingdom) ===
Name	Lifespan	Reign start	Reign end	Notes	Family	Image
Władysław I the Elbow-high: Polish: Władysław I Łokietek; King of Poland King	1261 – 2 March 1333	1320	1333	Restored; Re-united the Kingdom of Poland	Piast	
Casimir III the Great: Polish: Kazimierz III Wielki; King of Poland King	30 April 1310 – 5 November 1370 (aged 60)	1333	1370	Son of Władysław I the Elbow-high and Jadwiga of Kalisz; Regarded as one of the greatest Polish monarchs	Piast	

== Female Piasts ==
=== Queens consort ===
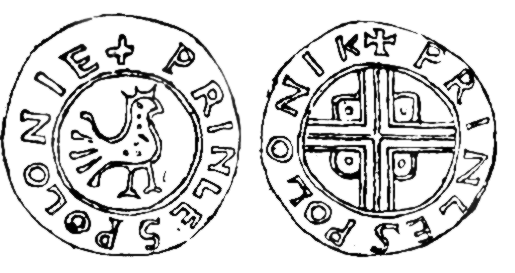
Denar Princes Polonie, 11th century (in the times of Bolesław I the Brave), one of the most recognizable coins in the history of Polish coinage.

- Świętosława, supposed daughter of Mieszko I of Poland, Queen consort of Denmark, allegedly also of Norway and Sweden, mother of Cnut the Great, King of all England, Denmark and Norway
- Świętosława of Poland, daughter of Casimir I the Restorer, Queen consort of Bohemia
- Richeza of Poland, Queen of Sweden, daughter of Bolesław III Wrymouth, Queen consort of Sweden, mother of Canute V of Denmark, King of Denmark and Sophia of Minsk, Queen consort of Denmark
- Richeza of Poland, Queen of Castile, daughter of Władysław II the Exile, Queen consort of León and Galicia, Queen consort of Castile, Empress of All Spains
- Salomea of Poland, daughter of Leszek I the White, Queen consort of Halych
- Fenenna of Kuyavia, daughter of Ziemomysł of Kuyavia, Queen consort of Hungary
- Elizabeth Richeza of Poland, daughter of Przemysł II, Queen consort of Poland and Bohemia
- Viola of Cieszyn, daughter of Mieszko I, Duke of Cieszyn, Queen consort of Hungary, Bohemia and Poland
- Maria of Bytom, daughter of Casimir of Bytom, Queen consort of Hungary
- Beatrice of Silesia, daughter of Bolko I the Strict, Queen of the Romans
- Hedwig of Kalisz, daughter of Bolesław the Pious, Queen consort of Poland, mother of Casimir III the Great King of Poland and Elizabeth of Poland Queen consort of Hungary
- Elizabeth of Poland, daughter of Władysław I the Elbow-high, Queen consort of Hungary, mother of Louis I, King of Poland, Hungary and Croatia and Charles I of Hungary, King of Hungary and Croatia
- Anna of Świdnica, daughter of Henry II, Duke of Świdnica, Queen consort of Germany, of Bohemia and Holy Roman Empress, mother of Wenceslaus IV of Bohemia, King of the Romans and of Bohemia
- Hedwig of Sagan, daughter of Henry V of Iron, Queen consort of Poland

=== Other ===
- Karolina of Legnica-Brieg, last legitimate member of the entire dynasty, Duchess of Schleswig-Holstein-Sonderburg-Wiesenburg

== Priesthood ==
=== Archbishops ===
- Bolesław of Toszek – Archbishop of Esztergom
- Władysław of Wroclaw – Archbishop of Salzburg

=== Bishops ===
- Jarosław of Opole – Bishop of Wrocław
- Mieszko of Bytom – Bishop of Nitra and of Veszprém
- Henry of Masovia – Bishop of Płock
- Jan Kropidło – Bishop of Poznań, Włocławek, Kamień and Chełmno, Archbishop of Gniezno (only formally)
- Wenceslaus II of Legnica – Bishop of Lebus and of Wrocław
- Henry VIII of Legnica – Bishop of Wrocław
- Konrad IV the Elder – Bishop of Wrocław
- Alexander of Masovia – Bishop of Trento
- Casimir III of Płock – Bishop of Płock

== Family tree of Piasts ==
Chościsko
Piast the Wheelwright; HOUSE OF PIAST
Siemowit duke of Polans
Lestek duke of Polans
Siemomysł duke of Polans
Mieszko I of Poland duke of Poland	Czcibor prince
Bolesław I the Brave king of Poland	Vladivoj duke of Bohemia	Mieszko I prince	Świętopełk prince	Lambert prince
Bezprym duke of Poland	Mieszko II Lambert king of Poland	Otto prince	Dytryk prince
Bolesław the Forgotten duke of Poland	Casimir I the Restorer duke of Poland
Bolesław II the Generous king of Poland	Władysław I Herman duke of Poland	Mieszko prince
Mieszko prince of Cracow	Zbigniew prince	Bolesław III Wrymouth duke of Poland
Władysław II the Exile duke of Silesia; BRANCH OF SILESIA	Bolesław IV the Curly high duke of Poland	Mieszko III the Old duke of Greater Poland; BRANCH OF; GREATER POLAND	Henry duke of Sandomierz	Casimir II the Just duke of Masovia; BRANCH OF LESSER POLAND
Leszek duke of Masovia	Odon duke of Greater Poland	Stephen prince	Mieszko the Younger duke of Kalisz	Władysław III Spindleshanks duke of Greater Poland	Leszek the White duke of Sandomierz	Konrad I duke of Masovia
Władysław duke of Greater Poland	Bolesław V the Chaste duke of Sandomierz	Bolesław I duke of Masovia	Casimir I duke of Kuyavia	Siemowit I duke of Masovia; BRANCH OF MASOVIA
Przemysl I duke of Greater Poland	Bolesław the Pious duke of Greater Poland	Leszek II the Black duke of Sieradz	Ziemomysł duke of Inowrocław	Władysław I the Elbow-high king of Poland	Casimir II duke of Łęczyca	Siemowit duke of Dobrzyń	Konrad II duke of Masovia	Bolesław II duke of Masovia
Przemysł II king of Poland	Leszek duke of Inowrocław	Przemysł duke of Inowrocław	Kazimierz III duke of Inowrocław	Casimir III the Great king of Poland	Leszek duke of Dobrzyń	Władysław the Hunchback duke of Dobrzyń	Bolesław duke of Dobrzyń	Siemowit II duke of Warsaw	Trojden I duke of East Masovia	Wenceslaus duke of Plock
Anna of Poland ∞ William, Count of Celje	Bolesław-Jerzy II king of Galicia-Volhynia	Siemowit III, Duke of Masovia duke of Masovia	Casimir I duke of Warsaw
Anna of Cilli ∞ Władysław II Jagiełło king of Poland	Janusz I duke of Warsaw	Siemowit IV duke of Plock; BRANCH OF PLOCK	Henry bishop of Plock
Janusz the Younger heir	Bolesław heir	Konrad Januszowic prince	Siemovit V duke of Plock	Alexander bishop of Trento	Casimir III duke of Plock	Trojden II duke of Plock	Władysław I duke of Plock
Boleslaw IV duke of Warsaw	Siemovit VI duke of Plock	Władysław II duke of Plock
Konrad III Rudy duke of Warsaw	Casimir III bishop of Plock	Bolesław V duke of Plock	Janusz II duke of Plock
Stanisław duke of Warsaw	Janusz III duke of Warsaw

== See also ==
Silesian Piasts Coat of Arms

- Kings of Poland family tree
- List of Polish rulers
- Dukes of Silesia
- Silesian Piasts
- Dukes of Masovia
- Dukes of Greater Poland
- Dukes of Teschen
- Dukes of Leczyca
- Dukes of Sieradz
- Category:House of Piast
- Wawel Castle
- Kingdom of Galicia–Volhynia
- Duchy of Bohemia
- King of Poland
- King of Rus'
- Duke of the Polans
- Duke of Poland
- Duke of Krakow
- Duke of Kuyavia
- Duke of Sandomierz
- Duke of Sieradz-Łęczyca
- Duke of Bohemia
