= Unnamed Hungarian (wife of Boleslaus the Brave) =

Hungarian princess (c. 969 – c. 988)

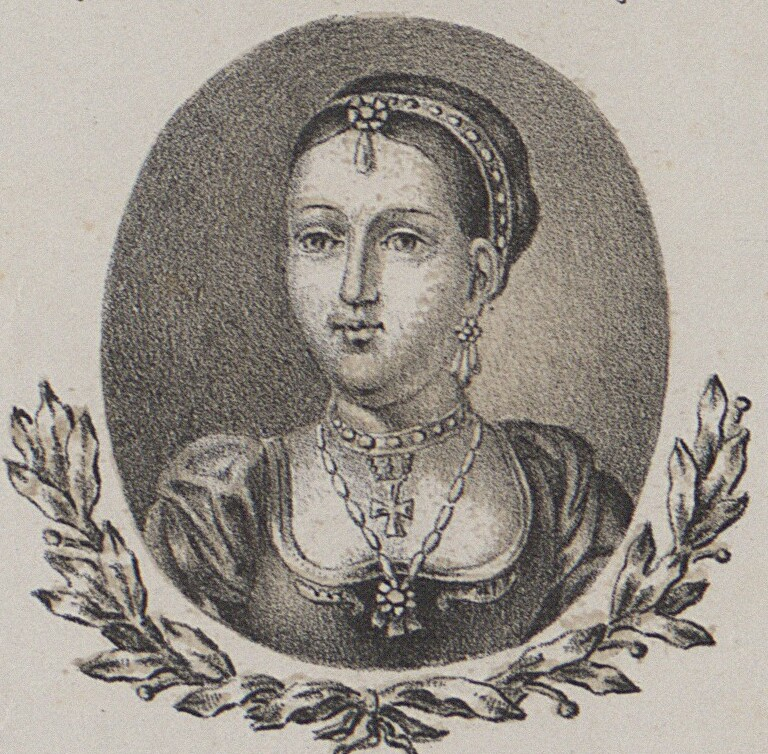
- Imaginary portrait of Boleslaus's second wife
- Born: Hungary
- Died: Unknown
- Spouse: Bolesław (m. c. 986; div. or ann. c. 987)
- Issue: Bezprym
- Father: Possibly Géza of Hungary or Gyula II
- Mother: Possibly Sarolt

Unnamed Hungarian woman was a Hungarian princess and the second wife of Polish prince of Piast dynasty, Bolesław, who eventually went to become the Duke and then the King of Poland.

According to some sources, she was the eldest child of Géza of Hungary by and his wife Sarolt, a daughter of Gyula of Transylvania.

However, modern historians have now discarded her parentage. There are suggestions she might have been in fact Princess Karolda, a sister of Sarolt and daughter Gyula II.

== Life ==
Around 986 she was married Bolesław, the first-born son of Mieszko I, thus becoming Polish princess; she was however soon was repudiated and sent away, as her husband remarried between 987 and 989. The result of this brief marriage was Bolesław's oldest son, Bezprym.

Kamil Janicki speculates that the union having been dissolved was the result of political intrigues of the Princess's stepmother-in-law, Oda of Haldensleben; he alleges that the Duchess wanted to weaken her stepson's position by breaking his potential alliance with the Hungarians. If the Princess is identical with Karolda, that means she eventually remarried and had a second son, Doboka.

Jerzy Besala points that the disollution of the marriage did not result in any conflict with Hungarians, which in his opinion implies Bolesław's second wife came from some minor princely house.

== See also ==
- History of Poland (966–1385)
