= Knights of the Cross =

Knights of the Cross may refer to:

- Knights of the Cross with the Red Star, whose insignia is a red Maltese cross on a black background
- Teutonic Knights, whose insignia is a black cross on a white background
- an alternate title of Henryk Sienkiewicz's novel The Teutonic Knights
- Knights of the Cross (album), by Grave Digger
- the "Knights of the Cross" are a group of Knights in "The Dresden Files"
- Knights of the Cross, a 2002 Polish video game
