= First Circle =

First Circle may refer to:

- In the First Circle, a novel by Aleksandr Solzhenitsyn
  - The First Circle (miniseries), based on the novel
  - The First Circle (1992 film), a Canadian-French television drama film
  - The First Circle (1973 film), an English-language drama film
- First Circle (album), a 1984 album by the Pat Metheny Group
- 1st Circle, Amman, a large traffic circle in Amman, Jordan
- The First Circle of Hell, in Dante's Inferno
