= Youth of Chopin =

- Directed by: Aleksander Ford
- Screenplay by: Aleksander Ford
- Produced by: Kazimierz Gaszewski / P.P. Film Polski
- Starring: Czesław Wołłejko; Aleksandra Śląska
- Release date: 25 March 1952
- Running time: 121 minutes
- Country: Poland
- Language: Polish

Youth of Chopin (Polish: Młodość Chopina) is a 1952 Polish film scripted and directed by Aleksander Ford, and produced by Film Polski at the Lodz Film Studio during 1951. It was released in the United States with English subtitles as Young Chopin in 1952 by Artkino Pictures

== Plot ==
A story of Chopin's life between 1825 and 1830 (ages 15 to 21).

== Main cast ==
- Czesław Wołłejko as Fryderyk Chopin
- Aleksandra Śląska as Konstancja Gładkowska
- Jan Kurnakowicz as Józef Elsner
- Tadeusz Białoszczyński as Joachim Lelewel
- Gustaw Buszyński as Adam Jerzy Czartoryski
- Igor Śmiałowski as Tytus Woyciechowski
- Jerzy Kaliszewski as Maurycy Mochnacki
- Justyna Kreczmarowa
- Maciej Maciejewski
- Emil Karewicz
- Jerzy Duszyński
- Leon Pietraszkiewicz
- Seweryn Butrym
- Leon Pietraszkiewicz as Nikołaj Nowosilcow
- Tadeusz Cygler as major Nikołaj Łunin
- Stefan Śródka
- Lech Ordon as student
- Maksymilian Chmielarczyk as Koźmian
