= Akty cechów wileńskich =

Collection of historical documents about Vilnius guilds

- Author: Henryk Łowmiański, Maria Łowmiańska, Stanisław Kościałkowski (eds., 1939); Jan Jurkiewicz (ed., 2006)
- Original title: Akty cechów wileńskich
- Language: Latin, Old Belarusian, Polish
- Genre: Historical documents, Source collection
- Publisher: Biblioteka Uniwersytecka w Wilnie (1939); Wydawnictwo Poznańskie (2006)
- Publication date: 1939; 2006 (republished)
- Publication place: Second Polish Republic (1939); Poland (2006)

Akty cechów wileńskich (Acts of Wilno Guilds) is a collection of documents on the socio-economic and economic history of Vilnius, as well as the history of professional and industrial corporations (guilds) of the city.

== History of publication ==
Initially, the collection was prepared in the 1920s and 1930s by Wilno historians Henryk Łowmiański, Maria Łowmiańska, and Stanisław Kościałkowski. The book, covering the period from 1495 to 1700, was published in Wilno in 1939 (compiled by H. Łowmiański). The edition was mostly printed (without a title page), but the print run was almost completely destroyed during the military actions of World War II in September 1939.

=== Republication ===
In 2006, historian Jan Jurkiewicz released an expanded re-edition in Poznań under the title Akty cechów wileńskich 1495—1759 (Acts of Wilno Guilds 1495–1759). It includes materials in two volumes. In the preface, J. Jurkiewicz highlighted the history of the book's preparation, provided the edition with a list of published documents, a bibliography, and name and geographical indexes.

Structure of the 2006 edition:

- Volume 1: 487 documents from the period 1495–1700 (corresponds to the content of the lost 1939 edition).
- Volume 2: 344 documents for the years 1701–1759.

== Content ==
The publication contains acts (including Grand Ducal privileges, extracts from Sejm resolutions, court verdicts, correspondence) related to the activities of Vilna guilds, craft and mead "brotherhoods", and various professional corporations — doctors, merchants, members of the Vilna magistrate, and others. The sources were documents from archives in Wilno, Warsaw, and Kraków, as well as earlier archaeographic publications.

The documents are in Latin, Old Belarusian, and Polish. They testify that many guilds in Vilna united Belarusian Orthodox craftsmen.

== Bibliography ==
- Галенчанка, Г. Я. (1996). "Акты віленскіх цэхаў". Беларуская энцыклапедыя: У 18 т. [Belarusian Encyclopedia: In 18 Vol.] (in Belarusian). Vol. 1. Мінск: БелЭн. p. 210. ISBN 985-11-0036-6.
- Пазднякоў, В. (2010). "Акты цэхаў віленскіх 1495—1759". Вялікае княства Літоўскае: Энцыклапедыя [Grand Duchy of Lithuania: Encyclopedia] (in Belarusian). Vol. 3. Мінск: Беларуская Энцыклапедыя. ISBN 978-985-11-0487-7.
