= Lestek =

9th–10th century Duke of the Polans

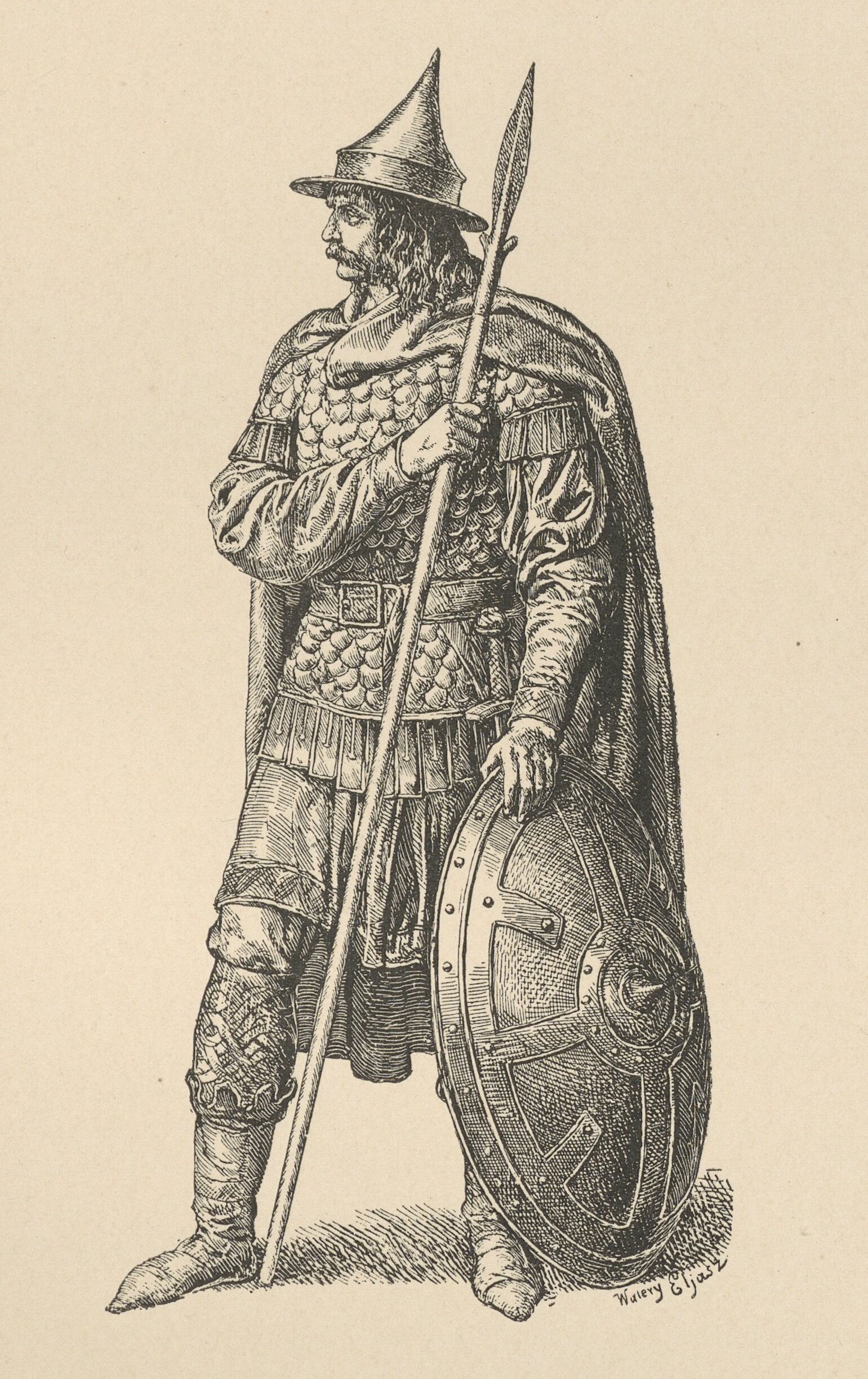

Duke of the Polans
- Reign: c. 900 – 950
- Predecessor: Siemowit
- Successor: Siemomysł
- Born: c. 880
- Died: 950
- Issue: Siemomysł
- House: House of Piast
- Father: Siemowit
- Religion: Slavic paganism

Lestek (also Leszek, Lestko) was the second duke of Polans, and son of Siemowit, born c. 870–880, mentioned in the oldest Polish chronicle, Gesta principum Polonorum by Gallus Anonymus. The dukes of Polans were the foundation of the Piast dynasty, the first historical ruling dynasty of Poland.

Initially, no one doubted the historicity of Lestek. In the second half of the nineteenth century, however, his existence began to be questioned. The issue was basically settled thanks to an article written by Henryk Łowmiański, in which he came out in favor of the credibility of Gallus Anonymus's account, and thus in favor of the historicity of the three direct predecessors to Mieszko I. This view is dominant in the Polish historiography.

The origin of his name is not known, but it can be derived from the old Polish word lście which means "crafty". It is believed this is a diminutive of the Slavic name Lścimir or Lścisław. The number and existence of Lestek's wives or consorts are unknown. A theory by Stanisław Zakrzewski claims Lestek (or Lestko) could have been married to a Moravian princess. Another theory (inferred from the descriptions of a Belgian chronicler from the 14th century) is that a Saxon princess could have been Lestek's wife and that they had a son, Ewraker, later the bishop of Liège. Lestko's son, Siemomysł, was the next ruler of the Polish state.

== See also ==
- Piast Dynasty

== Bibliography ==
- Jasiński, Kazimierz (1992). Rodowód pierwszych Piastów [Genealogy of the First Piasts] (in Polish). Warszawa, Wrocław: Oficyna Wydawnicza. ISBN 9788370634094. OCLC 57711993.
- Koneczny, Feliks (1902). Dzieje Polski za Piastów [These Polish (,) the Piasts] (in Polish). Kraków: (not available). p. 28. OCLC 250489461.
- Łowmiański, Henryk (1962). Dynastia Piastów we wczesnym średniowieczu [The Piast Dynasty in the Early Middle Ages] (in Polish). Poznań: Wydawnictwo PTPN. OCLC 749570930.
- Łowmiański, Henryk (1973). Początki Polski [Polish Origins] (in Polish). Vol. 5. Warszawa: PWN. OCLC 310478714.
- Wyrozumski, Jerzy (1999). Dzieje Polski piastowskiej : VIII w.-1370 [History of the Polish Piasts: 8th Century-1370] (in Polish). Kraków: Fogra. p. 70. ISBN 9788385719380. OCLC 45872048.
