= Czcibor =

10th-century member of the Piast dynasty

Czibor
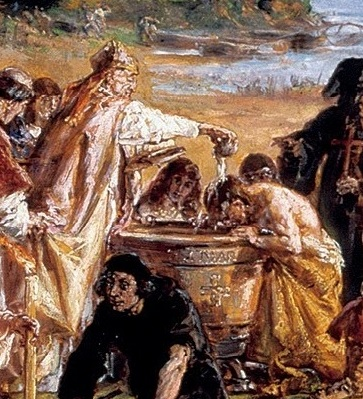
- Czibor's baptism, 19th century history painting by Jan Matejko
- Died: after 24 June 972; Poznań, Poland
- Dynasty: Piast dynasty
- Father: Siemomysł
- Mother: unknown

Czcibor (died after 972), known in Latin as Cidebur, was a member of the Piast dynasty and a Polan prince. He was the son of Duke Siemomysł and the younger brother of Poland's first Christian ruler, Mieszko I.

== Life ==
According to E. Rymar (2005), Czcibor may have been a governor of the Pomeranian lands after Mieszko I's conquest of that West Slavic tribes territory from around 967 AD. In medieval sources, he is mentioned but once in the chronicles by Thietmar of Merseburg, in relationship with Poland's victorious Battle of Cedynia against the forces of the Saxon margrave Odo I (Hodo) in 972 AD. He is thought to have been either the commander or one of the principal Polish leaders, along with his brother Mieszko, and Thietmar is the source of his presence at the battle. Czcibor's presence at Cedynia might have been based not only on his status as war leader and brother of the Polish ruler, but also by his position as 'governor' of conquered/annexed Pomerania.

His date of birth and death are unknown, his family: mother, wife or wives (he was most likely a pagan until 966 AD), and children are also unknown. In view of his name, his mother may have been of Sorbian (Lusatian) origin.

== Popular culture ==
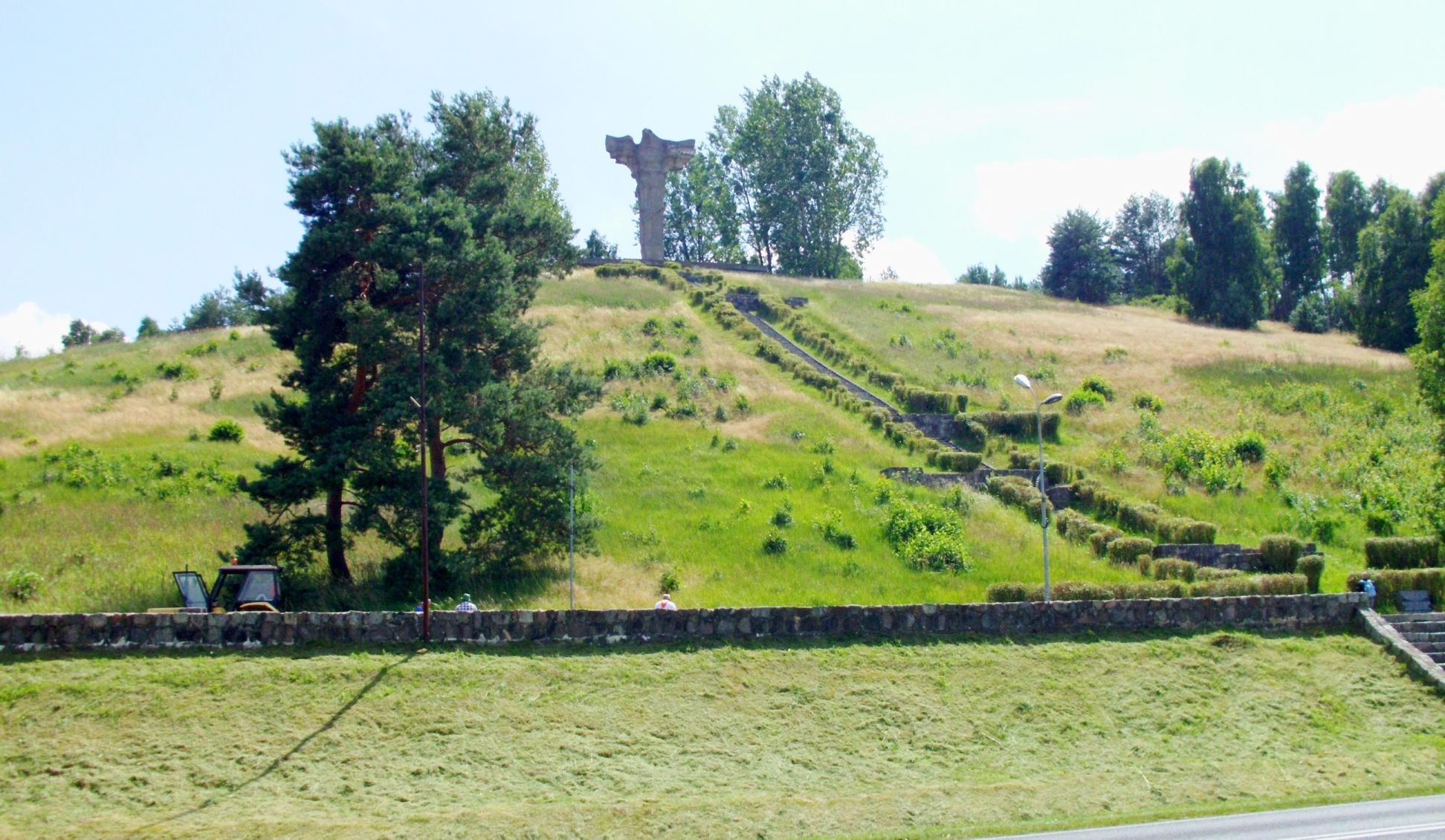
Góra Czcibora, Cedynia

Czcibor is known in the Polish popular culture, through books of Józef Ignacy Kraszewski, Zbigniew Nienacki and Paweł Jasienica, and was one of the principal characters in a 1974 Polish feature film Gniazdo directed by Jan Rybkowski. In 1977 Polish comics book artist Grzegorz Rosiński drew a story, based on Moczulski's storyline, where Czcibor appeared along with his brother Mieszko, this 8 full-panel long story appeared in a Polish comics monthly magazine Relax, volume 4.

There are streets named after him in some Polish cities and towns, e.g. Łobez, Łódź, Szczecin. At the site where, according to the research of archaeologist Władysław Filipowiak, the Battle of Cedynia most likely was fought, a hill is named Góra Czcibora ("Czcibor's Mountain"). A monument commemorating the victory was erected there in 1972, with a dedication in Polish and Russian, both mentioning Prince Czcibor.

== Sources ==
- Kronika Thietmara (translation by Marian Z. Jedlicki), Towarzystwo Autorów i Wydawców Prac Naukowych UNIVERSITAS, Kraków, Poland, 2005; ISBN 83-242-0499-7, pp. 32–33
- Jasiński, Kazimierz, Rodowód pierwszych Piastów, Wydawnictwo Poznańskiego Towarzystwa Przyjaciół Nauk, Poznań, Poland, 2004; ISBN 83-7063-409-5, p.71
- Paweł Jasienica, Polska Piastów, Panstwowy Instytut Wydawniczy, Warsaw, Poland, 1985; ISBN 83-06-01092-2, p. 44
- Rymar, Edward (2005). Rodowód książąt pomorskich. Książnica Pomorska. pp. 40–41, 52, 58, 65, 67. ISBN 978-83-87879-50-1.
