= Gniazdo =

1974 Polish historical film

- Directed by: Jan Rybkowski
- Written by: Aleksander Ścibor-Rylski
- Starring: Wojciech Pszoniak; Marek Bargiełowski; Wanda Neumann; Franciszek Pieczka; Bolesław Płotnicki; Tadeusz Białoszczyński; Janusz Bylczyński; Czesław Wołłejko
- Cinematography: Marek Nowicki
- Edited by: Wieslawa Otocka
- Music by: Jerzy Maksymiuk
- Production company: Studio Filmowe Kadr
- Release date: 19 July 1974 (Poland)
- Running time: 94 minutes
- Country: Poland
- Language: Polish

Gniazdo (English: The Nest) is a 1974 Polish historical film about Mieszko I, the founder of the first independent Polish state, circa 960 AD. The film was written by Aleksander Ścibor-Rylski and directed by Jan Rybkowski.

== Cast ==
- Wojciech Pszoniak as Mieszko I
- Marek Bargiełowski as Czcibor, Mieszko's brother
- Wanda Neumann as Dubrawa
- Franciszek Pieczka as Mrokota
- Bolesław Płotnicki as Siemomysł, Mieszko's father
- Tadeusz Białoszczyński as Gero
- Janusz Bylczyński as Odo I, Margrave of the Saxon Ostmark
- Czesław Wołłejko as Otto I, Holy Roman Emperor
