= Film Polski =

Polish film production company

Film Polski (also Przedsiębiorstwo Państwowe Film Polski) was the state-run film production and distribution organization of the Polish People's Republic, founded in 1945.

== History ==
On November 13, 1945, the postwar communist government decreed the formation of Polski Film as a national enterprise. Organized under the Minister of Culture Władysław Kowalski, Polski Film had control over both domestic film production and distribution of all foreign films. In the first years there was still room for smaller production companies, notably Yiddish-language.

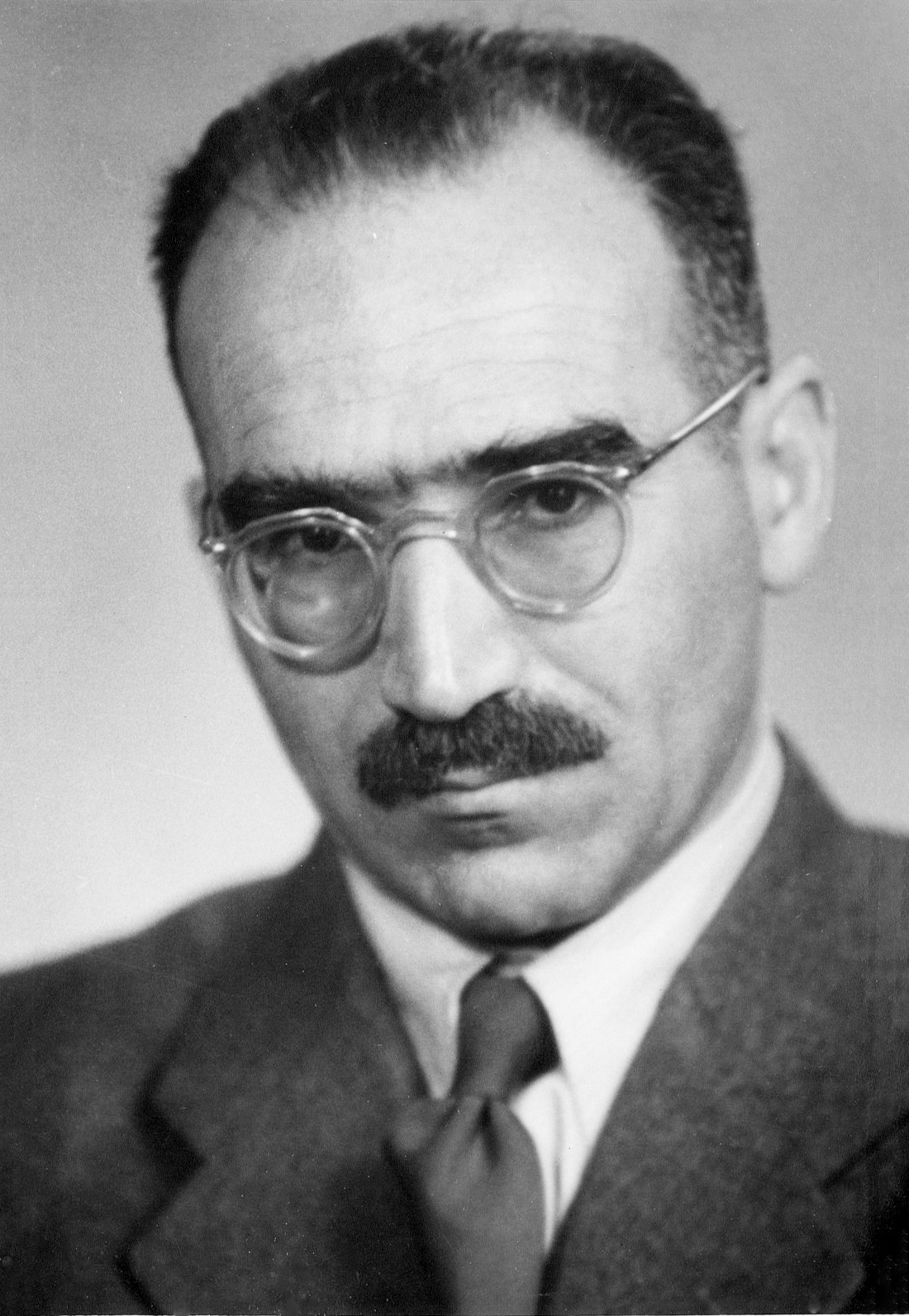
Aleksander Ford, first head of Film Polski

Aleksander Ford served as Film Polski's first director from 1945 to 1947. As Roman Polanski noted in his autobiography, Ford was both an "extremely competent" manager and "a veteran party member, who was then an orthodox Stalinist. ...The real power broker during the immediate postwar period was Ford himself, who established a small film empire of his own." With colleagues from the Polish United Workers' Party, Ford rebuilt the film production infrastructure, a national studio, and the National Film School in Łódź, which opened in 1948. Ford taught at Łódź for twenty years.

Poland's first postwar feature was Leonard Buczkowski's musical of the German occupation, Zakazane piosenki (Forbidden Songs). First released in January 1947 and very popular, in 1948 the film was re-edited and re-released, with more emphasis on Red Army's role as the liberator of Poland and the main ally of post-war Polish communist regime, as well as a more grim view of the German occupation of Warsaw and German brutality in general. Jerzy Zarzycki's Unvanquished City was similarly re-edited to become more ideologically acceptable.

Film Polski was dissolved as of January 1, 1952, succeeded by the Centralny Urząd Kinematografii (Central Office of Cinematography). In its important but brief history it released a total of thirteen feature films, along with dozens of short films and documentaries.

== Productions ==
Film Polski's output includes:

- Ostatni etap (The Last Stage), 1947, directed by Wanda Jakubowska
- Zakazane piosenki (Forbidden Songs), 1948, directed by Leonard Buczkowski
- Ulica Graniczna (Border Street), 1948, directed by Ford
- Skarb, 1949, directed by Leonard Buczkowski
- Robinson warszawski (Unvanquished City), 1950, directed by Jerzy Zarzycki
- Warszawska premiera (Warsaw Premiere), 1951, directed by Jan Rybkowski
- Mlodosc Chopin (Youth of Chopin), 1951, directed by Ford
