= Tępa Podkowa coat of arms =

Tępa Podkowa
- Families: 39 families: Bilczyński, Brzezicki, Bulkowski, Chojecki, Chyżeński, Czubiński, Dobiesławski, Dobrowolski, Dymowski, Dymski, Dymski Smogor, Falboski, Falbowski, Gomolicki, Hamerski, Janiszowski, Łabędzki, Łomszycki, Mianowski, Modaliński, Modliński, Nacelewicz, Nacelowicz, Naszewski, Nechrowicz, Niszowski, Ostrowski, Rączkowski, Sachrowski, Sarszowski, Stabrowski, Straka, Szczepankowicz, Szumko, Trzetrzewiński, Wolski, Złotarzewski, Złotaszewski, Żychowski

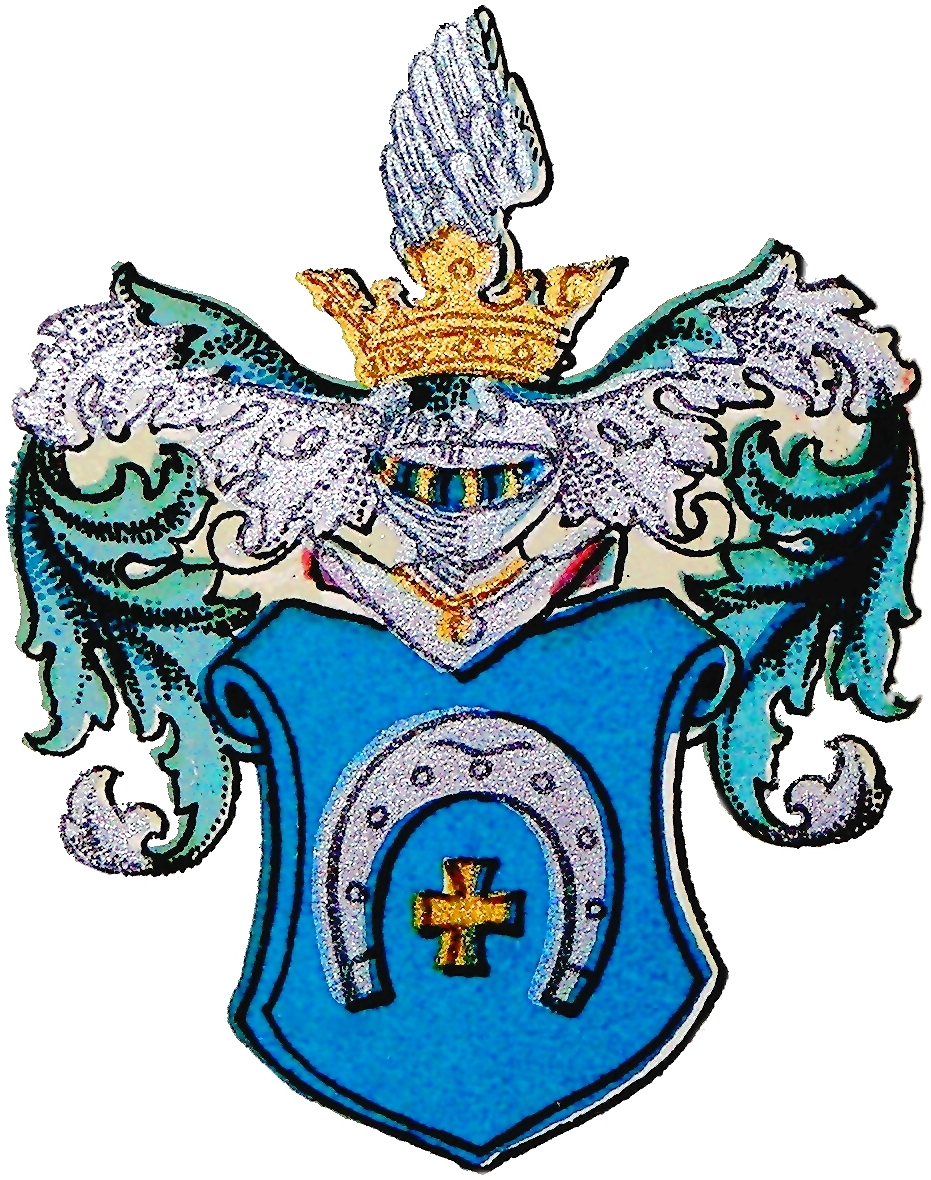
The original version of the coat of arms of the second half of the nineteenth century

Tępa Podkowa is a Polish coat of arms. It was used by several szlachta families in the times of the Polish–Lithuanian Commonwealth.

The name literally means "Dull Horseshoe".

== Blazon ==
The blazon can be translated as: On a blue field an upright standing horseshoe with a golden cross in the center. Blue mantling with silver and gold. In the crown a black wing.

== Notable bearers ==
The fictional characters of the knights Zbyszko of Bogdaniec and Maćko of Bogdaniec, the main characters in Henryk Sienkiewicz's The Teutonic Knights, are bearers of this coat of arms.

== See also ==
- Polish heraldry
- Heraldry
- Coat of arms
