= Jurand =

Jurand – male Slavonic (Polish) name. Its current form is the result of an error - a misinterpretation of the well-known Polish name Jarand, a form of the name Arnold, taken by Henryk Sienkiewicz from Middle Ages Polish texts for a character in his book, The Knights of the Cross. The book has enjoyed massive popularity at the turn of 19th century, becoming a mandatory part of school curriculum. Yet despite near-universal familiarity, the name sees only very limited use as a given name.

The name day for Jurand is May 6.
