= Lechitic =

Lechitic may refer to:

- Lechitic languages
- Lechites
