= Sabra (film) =

1933 Polish film by Aleksander Ford

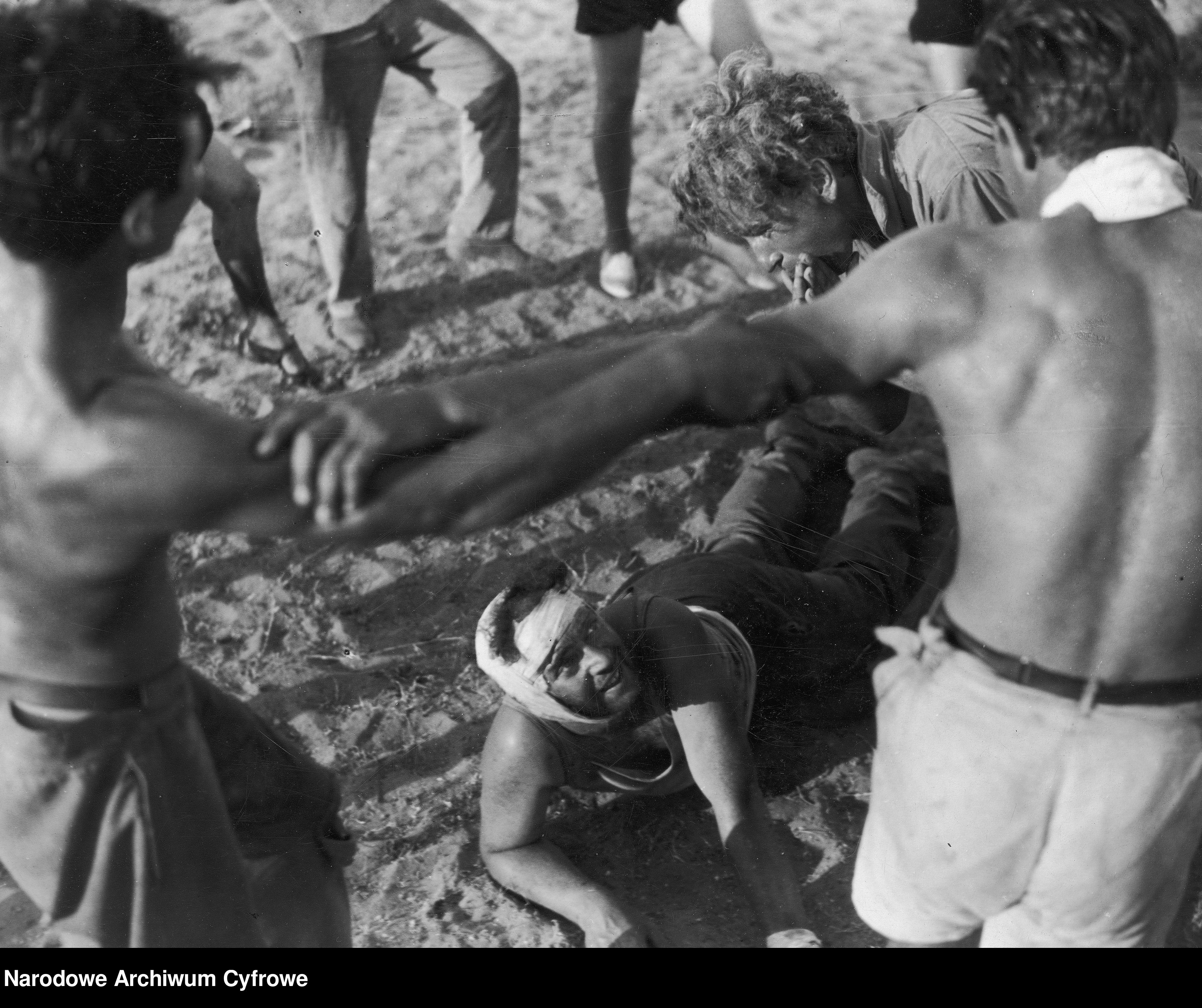
- Film frame
- Directed by: Aleksander Ford
- Written by: Aleksander Ford; Olga Fordowa
- Starring: Chana Rowina; Jehoszua Bertonow; Aharon Meskin; Pesach Bar-Adon; Rafael Klaczkin; Szymon Finkel
- Cinematography: Franz Weihmayr
- Music by: Simon Laks
- Production companies: Blok-Muzafilm; Sabra-Film
- Release date: November 21, 1933 (Poland)
- Running time: 84 minutes
- Countries: Poland; Mandatory Palestine
- Languages: Polish, Arabic, Yiddish, Hebrew
- Budget: 5,000 Palestinian pounds

Sabra is a 1933 Polish black-and-white drama film directed by Aleksander Ford, based on a screenplay by Ford and Olga Fordowa. The film depicts the struggles of a group of Jewish pioneers immigrating from Poland to Mandatory Palestine, where they establish a settlement. Their complex relationship with local Arab residents forms the backdrop for a romantic subplot involving an Arab girl and a Jewish boy.

Drawing inspiration from Soviet cinema, Ford promoted themes of solidarity, critiqued Jewish and Arab nationalism, and condemned religious fanaticism. However, the producers, disagreeing with his artistic vision, sidelined him during post-production, re-editing the film to emphasize its original intent: encouraging Jewish settlement in Palestine.

Sabra received mixed reviews. Critics from Kurier Polski, Wiadomości Literackie, and Kino noted its similarities to the Soviet film Thirsty Land (1930) by Yuli Raizman and criticized its disjointed screenplay, while reviewers from Nasz Przegląd and Opinia praised its artistic merits.

The film is preserved in the archives of the National Film Archive – Audiovisual Institute in Poland.

== Plot ==
A group of Jewish immigrants leaves Poland to settle in Mandatory Palestine. Welcomed by a sheikh in an Arab village, they are deceptively sold a vast plot of rocky desert land. The pioneers begin arduous work to develop the property, soon realizing the absence of a nearby water source; the closest well, owned by the sheikh and subject to fees, is miles away. They attempt to dig their own well, but desert winds repeatedly bury the excavation. As their wives join them, some resist contributing, sparking conflicts. Harsh conditions claim lives. During further digging, a mute worker discovers traces of water but becomes trapped in a sandstorm. Rescued, he struggles to communicate the discovery, facing disbelief and accusations of delusion.

Meanwhile, in the Arab village, ritual ceremonies unfold. The sheikh negotiates to buy a fellah's daughter for marriage, offering 40 pounds and free well access, unaware she loves a Jewish boy. Incited by the sheikh and frustrated by ineffective rain prayers, the Arabs grow hostile toward the Jewish settlers. Their anger culminates in a violent attack, driving livestock into the settlers' camp during celebrations of the water discovery. A clash ensues, destroying the settlement. The conflict ends when the Arabs learn the settlers have found water and are willing to share it.

The film's ending diverged based on versions. In Ford's vision, the Arab girl and Jewish boy die in the fight, and the well is buried by desert winds. In the theatrical release, the girl tends to her lover's wounds, followed by a scene depicting a prosperous Jewish state.

== Cast ==
The cast includes:

- Chana Rowina
- Jehoszua Bertonow
- Aharon Meskin
- Pesach Bar-Adon
- Rafael Klaczkin
- Szymon Finkel
- R. Goldberg
- R. Dawidow
- L. Horowic
- L. Flin
- Mula Cajtlin
- M. Teomi
- M. Forfeld
- Estera Bat-Eva
- Vera Disler
- A. Nachtomi
- S. Rafaeli

== Production ==
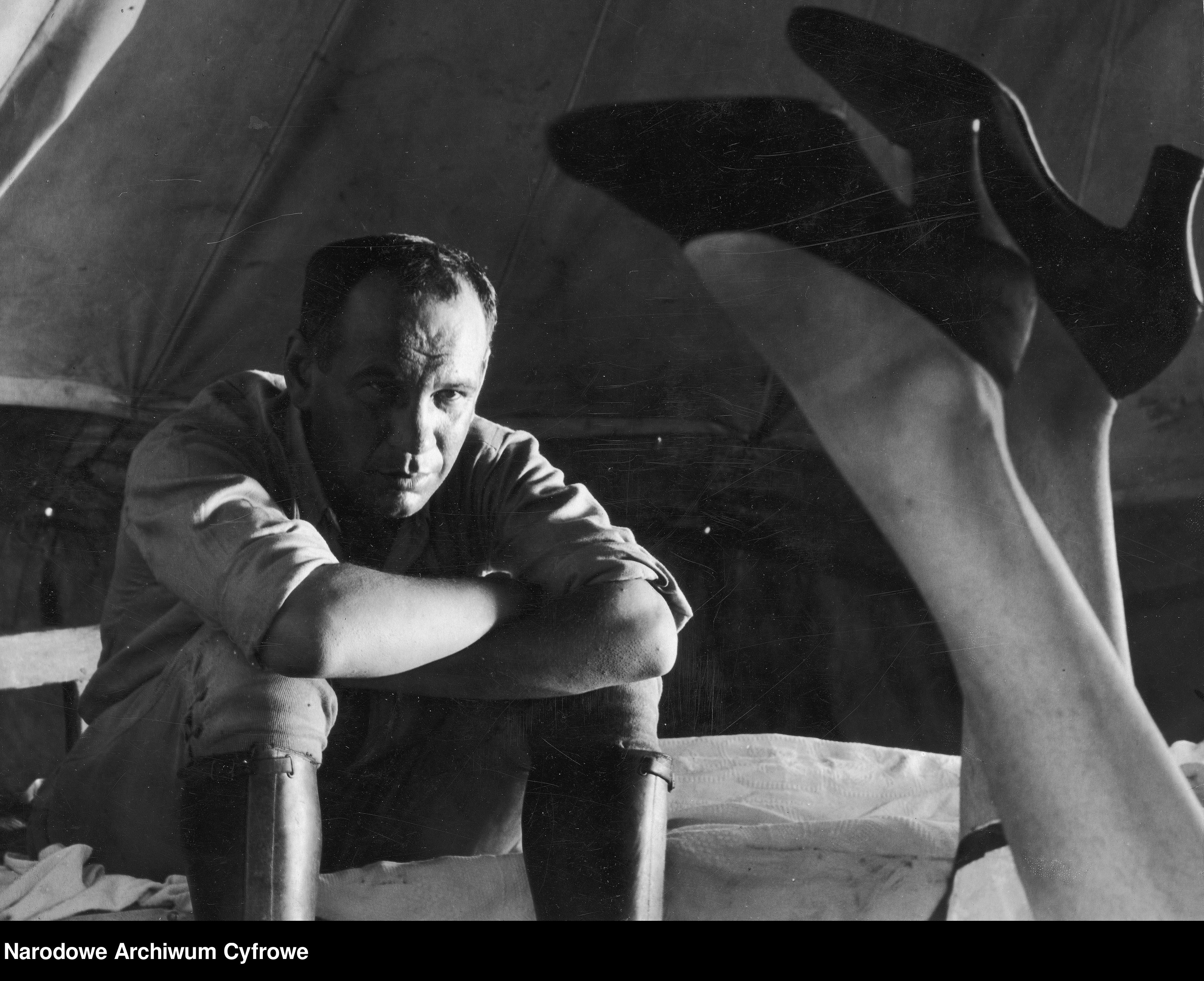
Scene from the film

Following the success of Legion ulicy (1932), Aleksander Ford sought to continue exploring social issues. Inspired by the Soviet film Road to Life (1931) by Nikolai Ekk, he planned a film on juvenile delinquency and rehabilitation, scripted by Andrzej Wolica for Leo-Film. The project was abandoned. Instead, Ford accepted Władysław Markiewicz's proposal to create a film about pioneers in Mandatory Palestine.

Ford, Olga Fordowa, and cinematographer Franz Weihmayr arrived in the Middle East without a screenplay. They traveled extensively, studying local communities, customs, and tensions, filming events like the Muslim Nabi Musa festival covertly, at personal risk, after signing a waiver with Mandate authorities.

As a committed communist, Ford was skeptical of Zionism, dismissing it as misguided, and declined offers to stay in Palestine to develop its film industry or work in theatre. Actor Szymon Finkel recalled: "Ford was a serious young man, ambitious, striving for perfection. He was left-leaning, or ‘somewhat left-leaning', as we said then, and wanted to return to Poland despite job offers here. He spoke dismissively of the Zionist cause and knew no Hebrew".

Ford's research shaped Sabra, named after the term for Jews born in Palestine and a type of prickly pear cactus. Drawing on Legion ulicy, he prioritized setting over narrative, blending authentic, unstaged footage with scripted scenes for a "dramatized report" effect. He cast professional actors from the Habima Theatre alongside local non-actors, filming in real locations like the desert and interiors, primarily in Gedera.

Rejecting Zionism, Ford downplayed the settlers' Jewish identity, portraying them as European workers, primarily Polish-speaking, with minimal Yiddish. He avoided framing the conflict as nationalistic, instead emphasizing class solidarity, inspired by Soviet cinema. The pioneers and poor Arabs are depicted as equals, reliant on the wealthy sheikh for resources like water and land. Ford included an anti-religious theme, contrasting the Arabs' rain prayers with the settlers' rational problem-solving.

Ford's vision clashed with the producers' goal of promoting Zionism and Jewish immigration. Editing occurred in Poland without Ford's involvement, and he disavowed the project. Dialogues were added in Polish, Arabic, Yiddish, and Hebrew. A new, optimistic ending and pro-settlement inserts, such as a speech by Nahum Sokolow, president of the World Zionist Organization, were included. A prelude, Kronika Palestyńska (Palestine Chronicle), featured footage of Polish embassy celebrations, Levant fairs in Tel Aviv, and the Maccabiah Games, also released separately as Makabiada. Additional documentaries covered Palestine, Transjordan, and Nabi Musa.

The budget was 5,000 Palestinian pounds.

== Release and reception ==
=== Distribution ===
Sabra premiered in Poland on 21 November 1933 at Warsaw's Splendid cinema. In Palestine, British Mandate authorities banned it, citing its anti-Arab, leftist, and propagandistic nature. According to Stanisław Janicki, it was not shown there, but Natan Gross notes that after Yaakov Davidon removed all Arab-related scenes, screenings were permitted.

=== Reception in Poland ===
Jerzy Toeplitz in Kurier Polski highlighted its striking resemblance to the Soviet film Thirsty Land (1930) by Yuli Raizman, noting similarities in theme and execution, though the 1930 film is set in Turkestan with Komsomol pioneers. He clarified that Ford did not oversee the final edit, which was handled by an unnamed Polish studio technician. Toeplitz criticized poor sound synchronization, inconsistent dialogue clarity, Simon Laks' shrill music, and uneven cinematography ("some striking shots but generally dull"). He praised the ensemble drama but faulted underdeveloped characters and abrupt plot threads, calling the film psychologically incoherent. He lauded the Habima actors, the sheikh's portrayal, and local extras but concluded that "Sabra is a blueprint for a good film, utterly failed. Instead of an original colonization epic, it's a poorly made, textually and formally weak echo of Thirsty Land".

A Wiadomości Literackie reviewer also criticized its reliance on Soviet films, particularly Thirsty Land, which excelled in logical structure and seamless action. Sabra, by contrast, lacked cohesion, with sluggish pacing in unengaging moments and overly abrupt cuts elsewhere. Stefania Heymanowa in Kino echoed the comparison, criticizing both films for chaotic screenplays, lack of structure, overuse of close-ups, and indecisive editing.

Nasz Przegląd offered praise, noting Ford's continuation of Legion ulicy's artistic approach, with broad thematic treatment, restrained acting, and expressive montage. The reviewer appreciated original scenes, music, and sound synchronization but criticized the "false pathos" and "hypocritical" expository subtitles, urging their removal, and noted minor flaws in character development as part of Ford's artistic experimentation. An Opinia critic called it a "Jewish film", though noting the absence of "Jew" or "Zionism" in the film or its program. Describing it as "generally correct, with highly artistic fragments", they commended Ford's originality and consistency despite limited resources, effective contrast in editing, and Habima's acting. They defended Ford against Soviet imitation claims but criticized irrelevant documentary inserts, like Arab festivals, that added little to the narrative.

== Bibliography ==
- Gross, Natan (2002). Film żydowski w Polsce [Jewish Film in Poland] (in Polish). Kraków: Rabid. ISBN 8388668234.
- Janicki, Stanisław (1967). Aleksander Ford (in Polish). Warsaw: Wydawnictwa Artystyczne i Filmowe.
