= Jerzy Kaliszewski =

Polish actor (1912–1990)

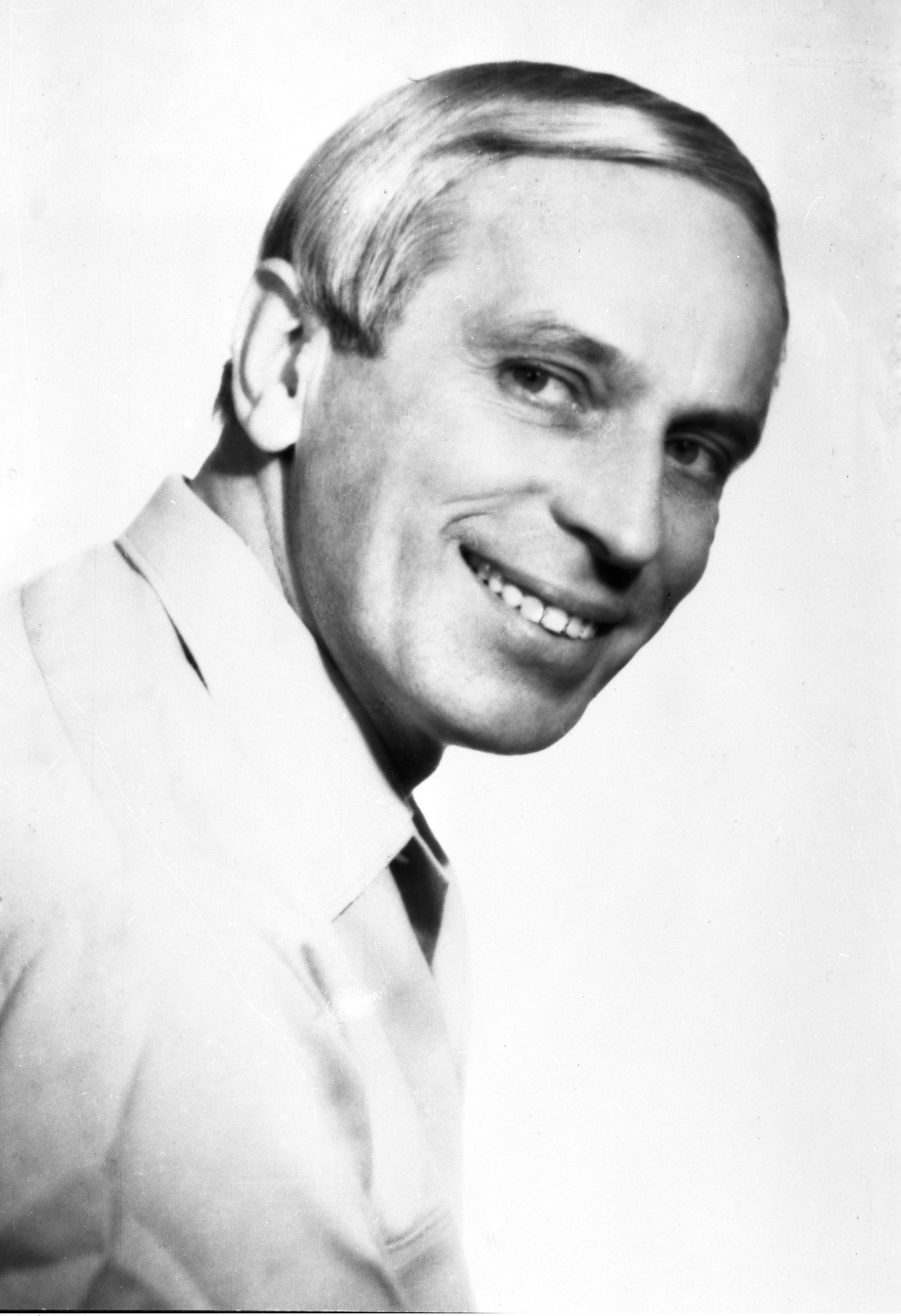
- Born: 8 June 1912
- Died: 31 May 1990 (aged 77)
- Occupation: Actor

Jerzy Kaliszewski (8 June 1912 – 31 May 1990) was a Polish actor, recipient of multiple awards.

== Filmography ==
- Doctor Murek (1939)
- Unvanquished City (1950)
- Youth of Chopin (1952)
- Stawka większa niż życie (1968)
- Boleslaw Smialy (1972)
- Inquest of Pilot Pirx (1979)
