= Unvanquished City =

1950 Polish drama film by Jerzy Zarzycki

- Directed by: Jerzy Zarzycki
- Written by: Jerzy Andrzejewski; Czesław Miłosz; Jerzy Zarzycki
- Starring: Jan Kurnakowicz
- Cinematography: Jean Isnard
- Edited by: Victoria Mercanton; Janina Niedźwiecka
- Music by: Roman Palester; Artur Malawski
- Distributed by: Film Polski
- Release date: 7 December 1950
- Running time: 86 minutes
- Country: Poland
- Language: Polish

Unvanquished City (Polish: Robinson warszawski, Polish: Miasto nieujarzmione) is a 1950 Polish drama film directed by Jerzy Zarzycki. It was entered into the 1951 Cannes Film Festival.

== Cast ==
- Jan Kurnakowicz as Piotr Rafalski
- Zofia Mrozowska as Krystyna
- Igor Śmiałowski as Andrzej
- Jerzy Rakowiecki as Jan
- Kazimierz Sapinski as Julek
- Henryk Borowski
- Lucjan Dytrych as Obergruppenführer Fischer
- Jerzy Kaliszewski as German Officer
- Andrzej Łapicki as SS Officer
- Alfred Łodziński as Niemiecki szabrownik
- Michal Melina as German General
- Jerzy Pietraszkiewicz as Russian Officer
- Jan Świderski as Russian Major
- Jerzy Wasowski as German Officer
- Kazimierz Wilamowski as German Officer
- Mieczysław Wojnicki as German soldier
