= Siemomysł =

10th century duke of the Polans

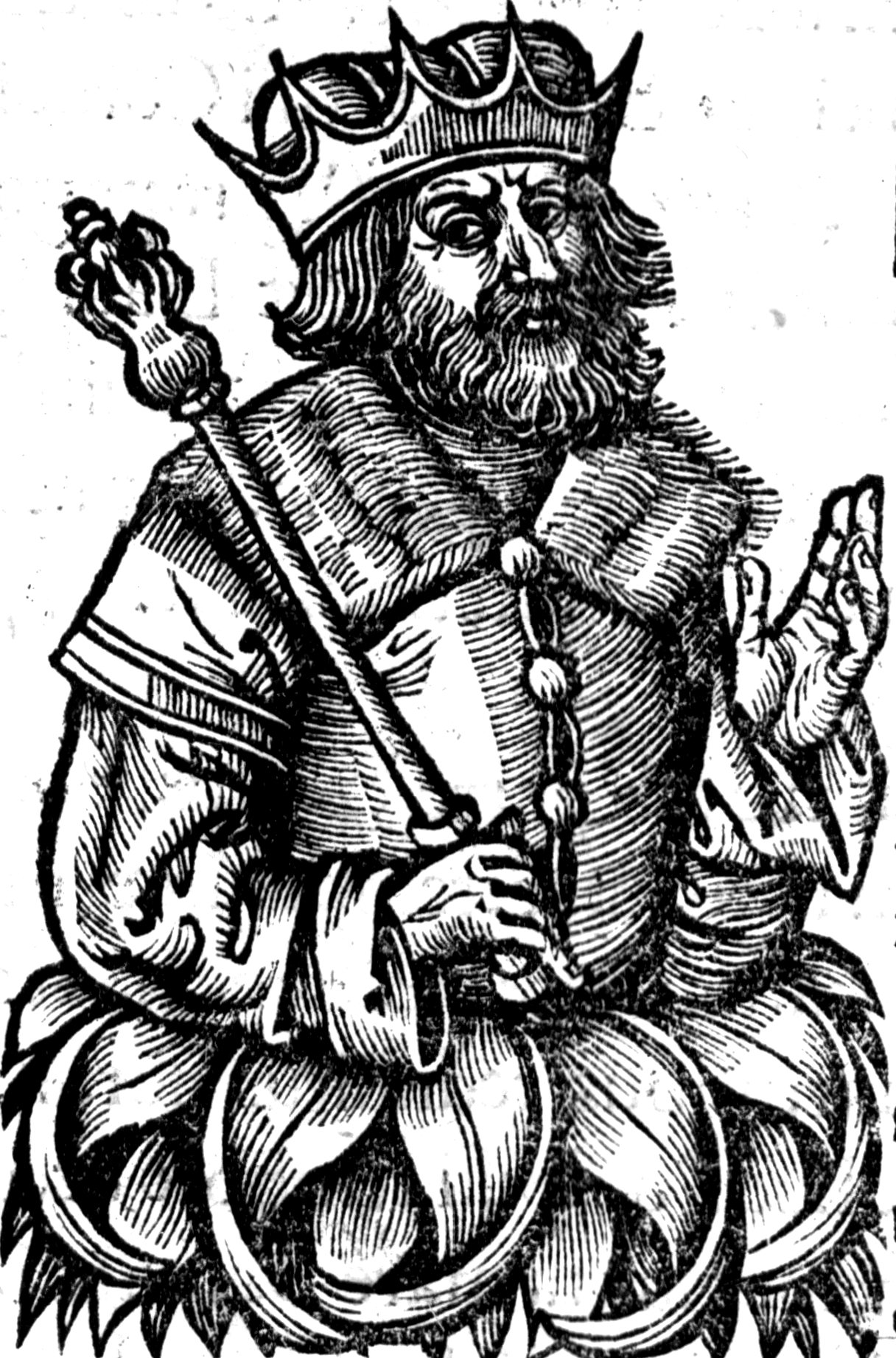
- Siemomysł as imagined in the Chronica Polonorum, 1519

Duke of the Polans
- Tenure: c. 950 – c. 960
- Predecessor: Lestek
- Successor: Mieszko I
- Born: c. 910
- Died: c. 960 (aged 50)
- Issue: Mieszko I of Poland; Czcibor
- House: House of Piast
- Father: Lestek
- Religion: Slavic paganism

Siemomysł or Ziemomysł (c. 910 – c. 960) was the third duke of the Polans and the father of Poland's first Christian ruler, Mieszko I. A member of the Piast dynasty, he was listed by Gallus Anonymous in his Gesta principum Polonorum as the son of Lestek, the second known duke of the Polans. According to Gallus' account and historical research, Siemomysł has been credited with leaving the lands of the Polans, Goplans and Masovians to his son Mieszko I, who further expanded them during his reign.

== Biography ==
Siemomysł's birth year and birthplace remain unknown. According to the chronicles, he was the son of a prince named Lestek who presumably ruled as Duke of Polans. In older sources, Siemomysł features under the name Ziemomysł.

He supposedly ruled from around 930, though some historians believe that it could have been from 950. Earlier theories by Adam Naruszewicz proposed that Siemomysł's reign could have begun as early as 913. However, this view is not accepted by contemporary historians.

It is believed that Siemomysł united the lands of the Western Polans, the Goplans, and the Masovians. It is possible that his father, Lestek, was the first to begin this process of unification in order to establish a centralised state, which would later become the Duchy of Poland in 966.

The name of Siemomysł's wife (or wives) is also a matter of debate. There is a theory that the daughter of Włodzisław, prince of the Lendians tribe, could have been Siemomysł's wife, but there is no historical evidence to support this. Formerly, it was thought that his wife was named Gorka, but Oswald Balzer refuted this view in 1895. Mieszko and Czcibor were his known sons.

According to modern Polish historian Henryk Łowmiański, Siemomysł aided the Ukrani uprising against the Germans in 954.

Siemomysł died in 960, though the latter is more probable according to 19th century and 20th century sources. His burial place is unknown.

== See also ==
- Poland in the Early Middle Ages

== Bibliography ==
- Jasiński, Kazimierz (1989). Rodowód Pierwszych Piastów (in Polish). Wrocław: Uniwersytet Wrocławski. ISBN 9788385218326.
- Lukowski, Jerzy; Zawadzki, Hubert (2006). A Concise History of Poland. Cambridge University Press. pp. 3–4. ISBN 978-0-521-61857-1.
- Naruszewicz, Adam (1836). Historya narodu polskiego (in Polish). Vol. 3. Leipzig: Breitkopf & Härtel. OCLC 731838020.
