= Mascotte (1930 film) =

1930 Polish film

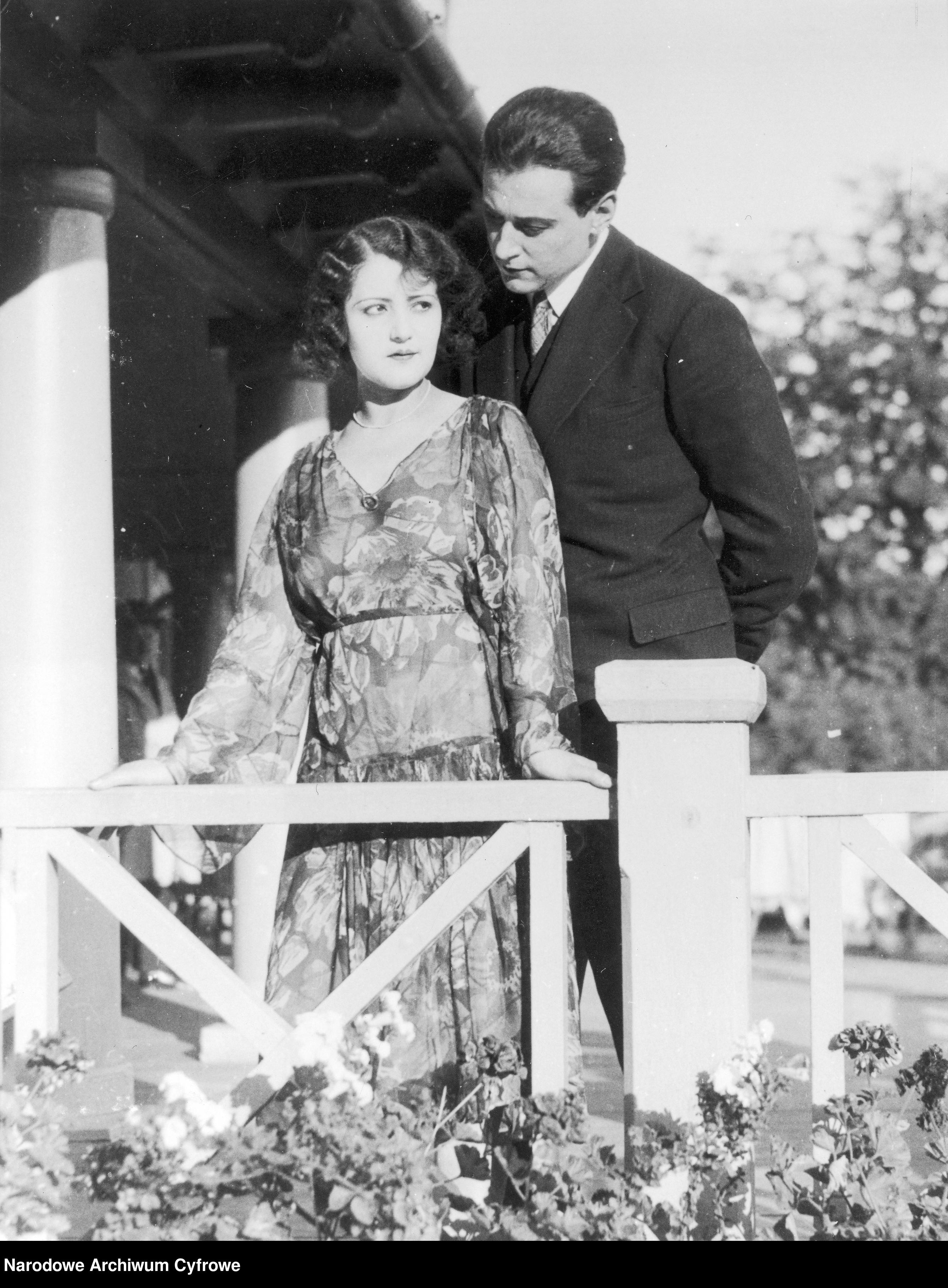
- Irma Green and Andrzej Karewicz in one of the scenes from the film
- Directed by: Aleksander Ford
- Written by: Leon Kniazołucki; Jerzy Dal-Atan
- Starring: Jerzy Dal-Atan; Irena Green; Ina Adrian; Alicja Borg; Andrzej Karewicz; Jerzy Kobusz
- Cinematography: Henryk Vlassak
- Release date: February 21, 1930 (Poland)
- Country: Poland
- Language: Polish

Mascotte is a Polish social drama from 1930, directed by Aleksander Ford, based on a screenplay by Leon Kniazołucki and Jerzy Dal-Atan. The film tells the story of Feliks Promieński (Jerzy Dal-Atan), who, after receiving a clay figurine, begins to experience good luck in gambling and love with Beata (Irena Green). After losing the amulet, he falls into trouble. Ultimately, he takes his fate into his own hands, wins a horse race, and regains Beata's love.

Critics were not favorable towards Mascotte. They criticized the poor script, acting, and direction. However, Maria Jehanne Wielopolska defended the film and Aleksander Ford.

Mascotte is considered a lost film.

== Plot ==
The main character, Feliks Promieński, receives a message one day informing him of his aunt's death, leaving him a small clay figurine in her will. The figurine depicts a pagan god. Feliks decides to keep the figurine. Oddly enough, from that moment on, luck seems to favor him everywhere – at horse races, while playing roulette, and even in love. During the races, Feliks meets a beautiful woman named Beata. It seems as though his life is finally falling into place, but then, Feliks loses the figurine, and his life begins to unravel. He loses everything, from his luck to Beata's love – or so he believes. The hero sinks lower and lower until he learns that the derby is approaching. He decides to take a risk and wager everything on one bet. He participates in the race and wins. After his victory, Beata is waiting for him.

== Production ==
In June 1929, the debut short film by Aleksander Ford, titled Nad ranem (At Dawn), began screening at the Warsaw cinema "Stylowy". This semi-fictional novella about the dawn in a large city was well received by the audience. Ford directed the production efficiently, using unconventional formal solutions and addressing social themes.

The success of the 22-year-old debutant encouraged the producers of the Zoro–Film studio to hire him as the director for their upcoming project, Mascotte. The screenwriters for the project were Leon Kniazołucki, who also served as producer, and Jerzy Dal-Atan, who played the lead role and was the production manager. The film's cinematographer was Henryk Vlassak, and the set design was handled by Stefan Norris and Józef Galewski. The cast, in addition to Dal-Atan, included Irena Green, Ina Adrian, Alicja Borg, Andrzej Karewicz, Jerzy Kobusz, and the Tatiana Girls ballet ensemble.

The screenplay for Mascotte lacked originality and broke no new ground, also lacking social elements. This did not discourage Ford, as it provided him the opportunity to gain experience with his first feature film and further develop his directing skills. According to Ford's biographer, Stanisław Janicki, the filmmaker used techniques such as:

- Subjective camera angles (e.g., the point of view of a roulette ball)
- Hidden camera shots (during a New Year's Eve party)
- Unusual framing angles, expressive and lyrical shots (e.g., a fragment of Old Warsaw, riverside beaches)
- Unexpected montage associations, striking and sometimes intrusive close-ups
- Non-traditional, anti-established dramaturgical structure
- Nervous, chaotic narrative, not based on classical storytelling rules

In the final stages of production, the producers made adjustments, softening Ford's formal techniques and artistic vision.

== Film premiere and reviews ==
The premiere of Mascotte took place on 21 February 1930 at the Warsaw cinema "Pan".

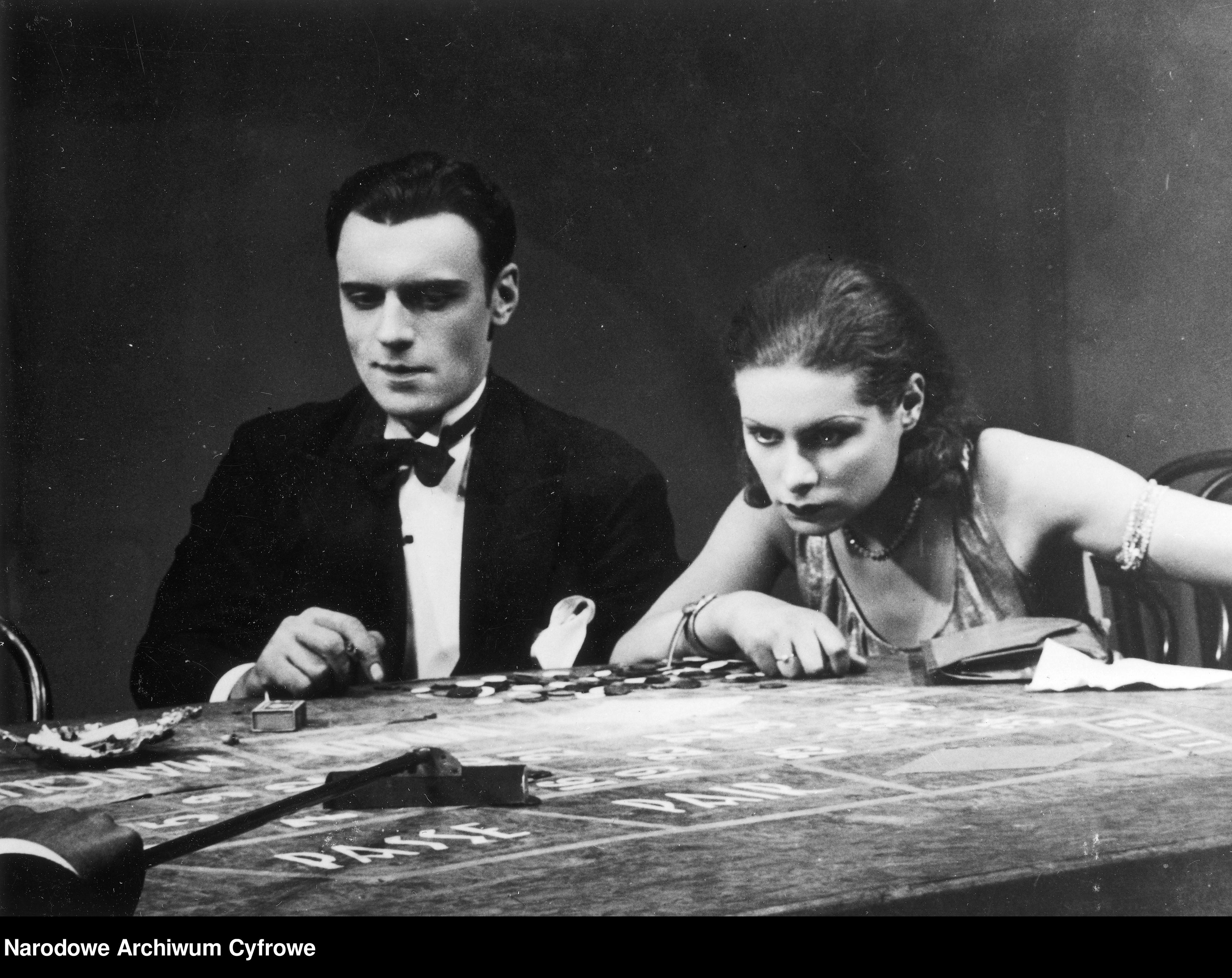
Ina Adrian and Jerzy Dal-Atan in a scene from the film

A critic from Kurier Warszawski gave the film a negative review, criticizing the average screenplay, as the story of the characters revolves in a narrow circle: races, roulette, cards, alcohol, dancing, and then repeats. The direction was deemed naïve, uneven, and quite primitive, although it had some successful moments. The journalist praised some of Henryk Vlassak's cinematography. Among the actors, he praised Irma Green and Andrzej Karewicz, but ridiculed Ina Adrian, stating that she resembled Greta Garbo only when she wasn't acting.

Tadeusz Miciukiewicz from ABC described Mascotte as a foolish and naïve production. He criticized the experimental attempts with the camera, poor actor selection, weak lighting, and the illogical plot. He positively assessed Irma Green's performance but was unfavorable towards Ina Adrian's performance, saying she lacked talent and dismissing the comparison to Greta Garbo.

Maria Jehanne Wielopolska argued that foreign films, even average ones that try formal innovation, are often praised by Polish critics. In contrast, similar attempts at innovation by Polish filmmakers face unfair criticism. She stated that Mascotte was "the first genuine attempt to direct Polish cinematographic art towards independent invention". Wielopolska positively commented on the performances of Irma Green, Ina Adrian, and Jerzy Dal-Atan. She praised the scenes on the beach, the walk by the water, the fishing scene, the final race scene, the meeting between Dal-Atan and Irma Green, and the depiction of views of Warsaw (e.g., the corner building at Piękna and Polna streets). She also expressed admiration for Ford's experiments with camera placement, lighting, interesting close-ups, and the deliberate slowing of action. The reviewer wrote:

Ford, here and there, surpasses the best foreign directors, and when he fully masters the discrepancy in technique, which is notably fragmented and intimate in his case and doesn't always match the texture, continuity of action, and architectural construction of the work, he will become a formidable competitor – not only to Polish directors but also to many excellent and famous German, Soviet, and American directors.
