= Bolesław Płotnicki =

Polish actor

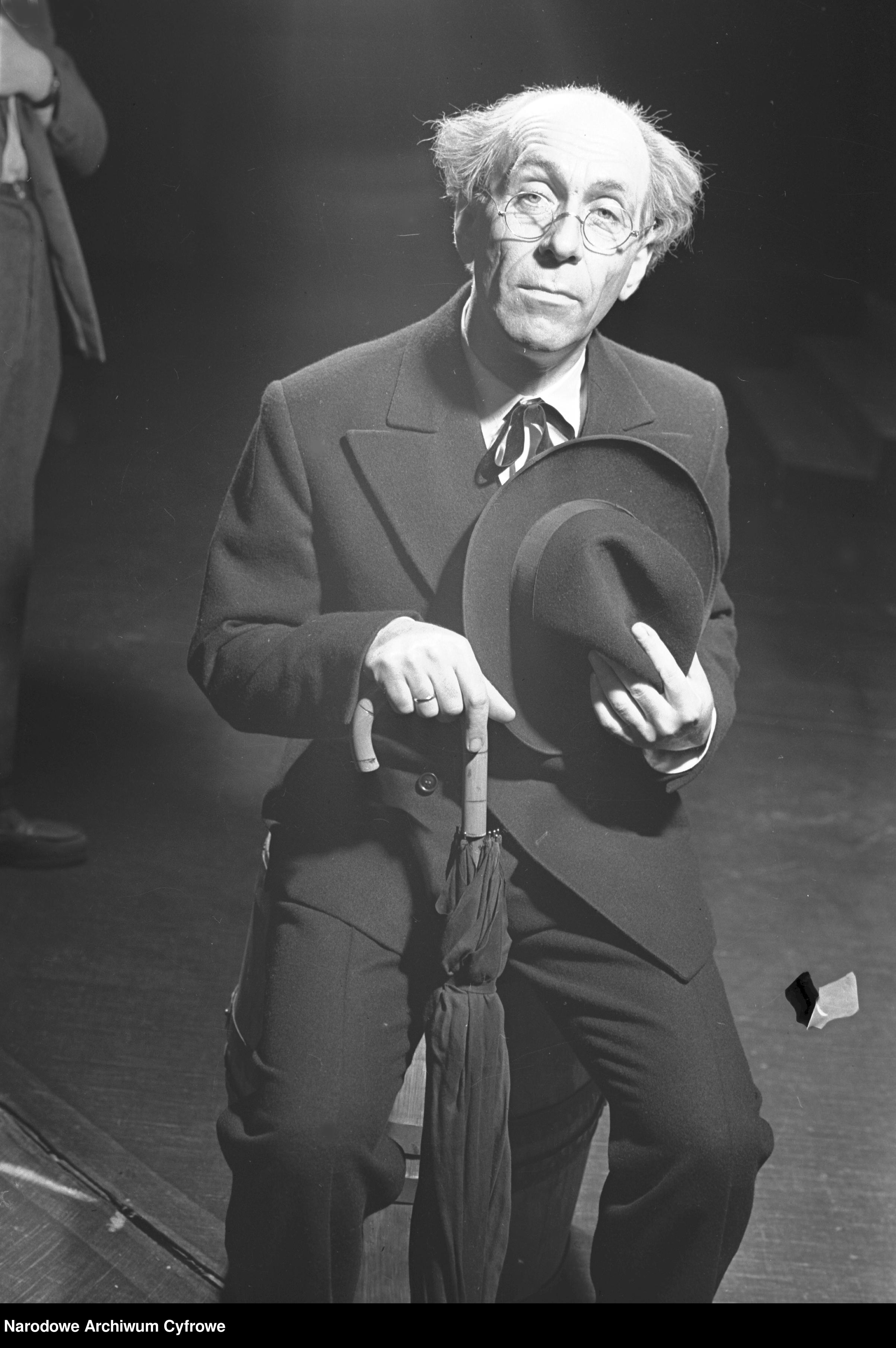
- Płotnicki in 1958 for Wizyta starszej pani
- Born: 17 June 1913; Kiev, Russian Empire (now Kyiv, Ukraine)
- Died: 7 September 1988 (aged 75); Warsaw, Poland
- Occupation: Actor
- Years active: 1953–1983

Bolesław Płotnicki (17 June 1913 – 7 September 1988) was a Polish actor. He appeared in more than 80 films and television shows between 1953 and 1983.

== Selected filmography ==
- Zaczarowany rower (1955)
- Shadow (1956)
- Kwiecień (1961)
- The Impossible Goodbye (1962)
- Nieznany (1964)
- Gniazdo (1974)
