= Czesław Wołłejko =

Polish actor

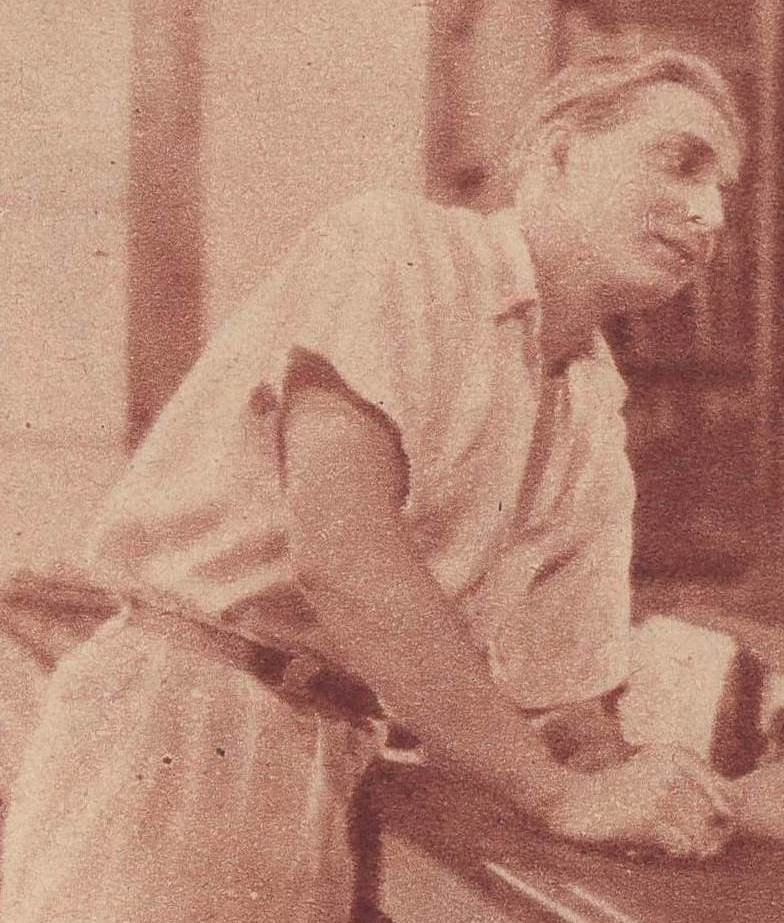
- Czesław Wołłejko in 1947.
- Born: 17 March 1916; Vilnius, Lithuania
- Died: 7 February 1987 (aged 70); Warsaw, Poland
- Occupation: Actor
- Years active: 1952-1984

Czesław Wołłejko (17 March 1916 – 7 February 1987) was a Polish film, theatre, television and radio actor, as well as a director. He appeared in more than twenty films. Best known for his role as Baron Krzeszowski in the series The Doll based on the book by Bolesław Prus.

== Early years of life ==
He was born in Vilnius and was growing up in an artistic family – his father Ignacy was a dancer. There are doubts about his date of birth: most available online sources give the date of March 17, 1916, and the actor himself also gave it in questionnaires and biographies. However, his tombstone has engraved the date of birth as March 17, 1920.

== Theatre and film ==
The actor's theatre debut took place in the autumn 1939 in Grodno in the comedy Panna Maliczewska by Gabriela Zapolska at the local State Polish Theatre. With this performance, Wołłejko charmed the audience and began his theatre career. The Polish Theatre was soon moved by the authorities to the city Białystok, where in 1940 Wołłejko graduated from the acting studio.

In 1944 and 1945, Wołłejko began acting at the Polish Army Theatre in Lublin, and then in Łódź. His first role was Kacper in Wesele by Stanisław Wyspiański directed by Jacek Woszczerowicz. Since 1948, Czesław Wołłejko had been an actor at the Polish Theatre. In 1950, he played the title role in Molière's Don Juan, also directed by Korzeniewski. This performance was later cancelled by the authorities, but the actor managed to impress critics and the audience. In 1956, he played Chopin in Lato w Nohant by Jarosław Iwaszkiewicz, directed by Maria Wiercińska.

In 1969, he moved to the Contemporary Theatre. At the Contemporary Theatre, he played for example the Tsar of Russia in Juliusz Słowacki's Kordian. He also played Oberon in Shakespeare's Midsummer Night's Dream directed by Maciej Englert and the father in Gombrowicz's Wedding directed by Krzysztof Zaleski. For a short period, he performed at the Ateneum Theatre, where he played, among others,Ignacy Krasicki in Adolf Nowaczyński's The Great Fryderyk and the king Stanisław August in Jerzy Sita's Polonaise.

As a film actor, Czesław Wołłejko made his debut in 1951, playing the role of Fryderyk Chopin in the movie Youth of Chopin by Aleksander Ford. He also played various roles in television series. Since the 1960s he has also been involved in directing performances and has lectured at the State Higher School of Theatre in Łódź.

== Last years of life and death ==
Wołłejko was married twice. His first wife was Halina Czengery – an actress, daughter of the director of the local State Polish Theatre in Grodno. He met her while starting the theater career, playing his first role in Panna Maliczewska. They got married in 1942 and had two daughters – Jolanta, born on September 15, 1942, and Magdalena on May 27, 1955. Both, like their parents, became actresses. In the final years of his first marriage, he became interested in Ilona Stawińska – the wife of another actor, Tadeusz Pluciński. Later he married Stawińska and they remained married until the actor's death. Tadeusz Pluciński, in turn, became the husband of Wołłejko's eldest daughter – Jolanta.

The actor died on February 7, 1987 of a heart attack. He died during intensive preparations for the role of Woland in The Master and Margarita by Mikhail Bulgakov. He died in Warsaw and was buried at the Powązki Military Cemetery.

== Selected filmography ==
Film
Year	Title	Role	Notes
1952	Youth of Chopin		
1963	Black Wings		
1973	Copernicus		
1974	Gniazdo		
1975	Hotel Pacific		
1980	Wielka Majowka		
1981	Zamach stanu		
1983	Danton		

TV
Year	Title	Role	Notes
1967	Stawka większa niż życie		
