= Knights of the Cross (video game) =

2002 video game

- Developer(s): Free Mind
- Publisher(s): Cenega
- Platform(s): Windows
- Release: 2002
- Genre(s): Strategy
- Mode(s): Single-player

Knights of the Cross (Polish: Krzyżacy) is a 2002 historical turn-based strategy video game for Microsoft Windows, set in the early 15th century during the Polish–Lithuanian–Teutonic War. It was developed in Poland by Free Mind and published by Cenega.

The game is inspired by the 1900 novel The Knights of the Cross by Polish writer Henryk Sienkiewicz. The player can control either the Polish–Lithuanian or the German side. In addition to the Polish version, the game has received English and Russian releases.
