= The First Circle (1973 film) =

- Directed by: Aleksander Ford
- Screenplay by: Aleksander Ford
- Based on: In the First Circle by Aleksandr Solzhenitsyn
- Produced by: Mogens Skot-Hansen
- Cinematography: Wladyslaw Forbert
- Edited by: Carl Lerner
- Music by: Roman Palester
- Production companies: Laterna Film; Tele-Cine Film
- Distributed by: Paramount Pictures (USA)
- Release date: 10 November 1973
- Running time: 100 minutes
- Countries: Denmark; West Germany
- Language: English

The First Circle (Danish: Den første kreds) is a 1973 English-language drama film directed by Aleksander Ford and starring Gunther Malzacher. It is an adaptation of the novel In the First Circle by Aleksandr Solzhenitsyn. The film was a co-production between Danish and West German companies.

== Plot ==
An outspoken scientist is sent to a brutal Soviet labor camp in Siberia. As he dreams of escape, his tormentors can't break his independent spirit.

== Cast ==
- Gunther Malzacher as Gleb Nerzhin
- Elżbieta Czyżewska as Simochka
- Peter Steen as Volodin
- Vera Tschechowa as Clara
- Ole Ernst as Ruska Doronin
- Ingolf David as Rubin
- Preben Neergaard as Bobynin
- Preben Lerdorff Rye as professor Chelnov
- Per Bentzon Goldschmidt as Bulatov
- Ole Ishøy as Siromakha
