= Władysław Filipowiak =

Polish professor, writer, and archaeologist

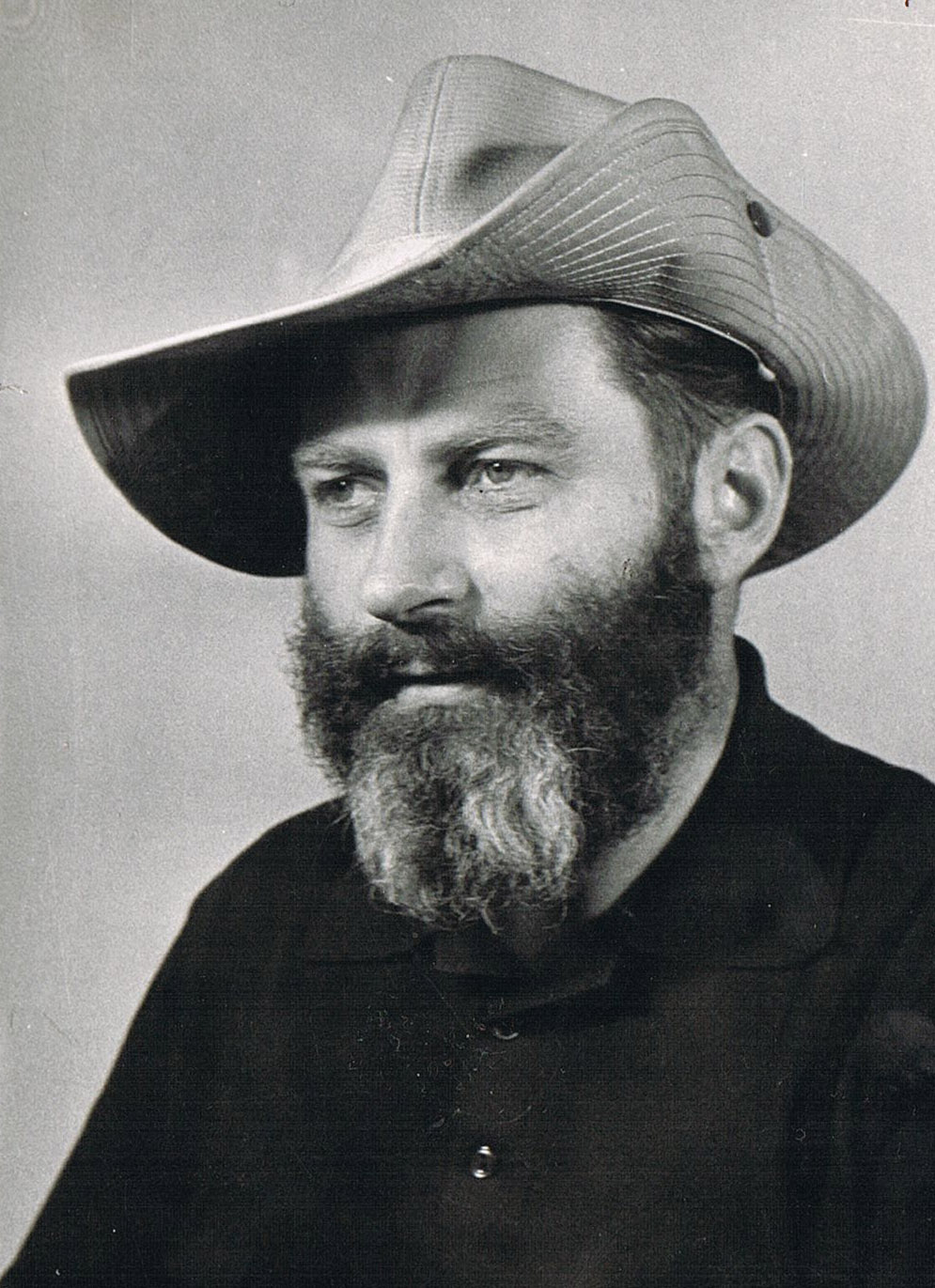
Władysław Filipowiak

Władysław Filipowiak (29 April 1926 – 31 March 2014) was a Polish professor, writer, and archaeologist. He was a director of the National Museum in Szczecin.

He was the author of over 200 publications in the field of early medieval archeology. In the past year was an Honorary Citizen of the Commune Wolin. Filipowiak was born in Kaczyce, Poland.

Filipowiak died on 31 March 2014 in Szczecin, Poland from natural causes, aged 88.
