= Jerzy Zarzycki =

Polish film director

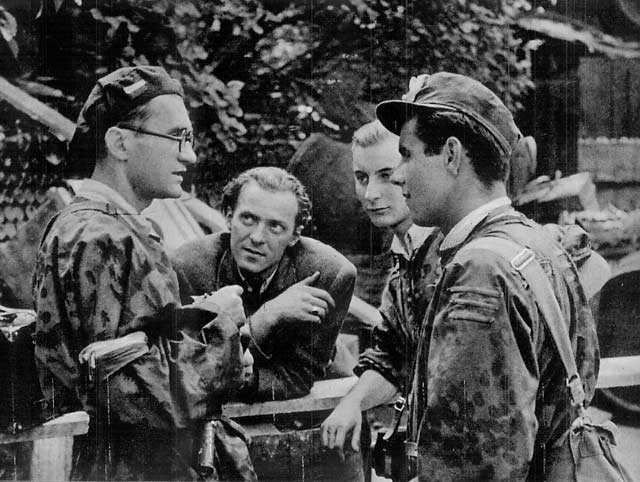
- Warsaw Uprising: Jerzy Zarzycki "Pik" (on the left), correspondent of Referat Filmowy BiP KG AK, in a discussion with soldiers from the Starówka district
- Born: 11 January 1911; Łódź, Poland
- Died: 2 January 1971 (aged 59); Warsaw, Poland
- Occupation: Film director
- Years active: 1931–1970

Jerzy Zarzycki (11 January 1911 – 2 January 1971) was a Polish film director. He directed 24 films between 1931 and 1970. He co-directed the 1933 film The Sea, which was nominated for an Academy Award in 1933 for Best Short Subject (Novelty).

== Selected filmography ==
- The Sea (1933)
- Unvanquished City (1950)
