= In the First Circle =

Novel by Aleksandr Solzhenitsyn

- First edition
- Author: Aleksandr Solzhenitsyn
- Original title: В круге первом
- Translator: H. T. Willetts
- Language: Russian
- Genre: semi-autobiographical novel
- Publisher: Harper & Row (Eng. edition)
- Publication date: 1968 (In the West), 1990 USSR
- Publication place: Soviet Union
- Media type: Print (paperback)
- Pages: 741 pp.
- ISBN: 0-06-147901-2
- OCLC: 37011369
- Dewey Decimal: 891.73/44 21
- LC Class: PG3488.O4 V23 1997

In the First Circle (Russian: В круге первом, romanized: V kruge pervom; also published as The First Circle) is a novel by Russian writer Aleksandr Solzhenitsyn, released in 1968. A more complete version of the book was published in English in 2009.

The novel depicts the lives of the occupants of a sharashka (a research and development bureau made of Gulag inmates) located in the Moscow suburbs. This novel is highly autobiographical. Many of the prisoners (zeks) are technicians or academics who have been arrested under Article 58 of the RSFSR Penal Code in Joseph Stalin's purges following the Second World War. Unlike inhabitants of other Gulag labor camps, the sharashka zeks were adequately fed and enjoyed good working conditions; however, if they found disfavor with the authorities, they could be instantly shipped to Siberia.

The title is an allusion to Dante's first circle, or limbo of Hell in The Divine Comedy, wherein the philosophers of Greece, and other virtuous pagans, live in a walled green garden. They are unable to enter Heaven, as they were born before Christ, but enjoy a small space of relative freedom in the heart of Hell.

== Plot summary ==
Innokentii Volodin, a diplomat, makes a telephone call to an old family doctor (Dobrumov) he feels obliged by conscience to make, even though he knows he could be arrested. His call is taped and the NKVD seek to identify who has made the call. (In the second, greatly extended edition of the book, the call is made to the American Embassy in Moscow.)

The sharashka prisoners, or zeks, work on technical projects to assist state security agencies and generally pander to Stalin's increasing paranoia. While most are aware of how much better off they are than "regular" gulag prisoners (some of them having come from gulags themselves), some are also conscious of the overwhelming moral dilemma of working to aid a system that is the cause of so much suffering. As Lev Rubin is given the task of identifying the voice in the recorded phone call, he examines printed spectrographs of the voice and compares them with recordings of Volodin and four other suspects. He narrows it down to Volodin and one other suspect, both of whom are arrested.

By the end of the book, several zeks, including Gleb Nerzhin, the autobiographical hero, choose to stop co-operating, even though their choice means being sent to much harsher camps.

Volodin, initially crushed by the ordeal of his arrest, begins to find encouragement at the end of his first night in prison.

The book also briefly depicts several Soviet leaders of the period, including Stalin himself, who is depicted as vain and vengeful, remembering with pleasure the torture of a rival, dreaming of one day becoming emperor of the world, or listening to his subordinate Viktor Abakumov and wondering: "...has the day come to shoot him yet?"

== Themes ==
The novel addresses numerous philosophical themes, and through multiple narratives is a powerful argument both for a stoic integrity and humanism. Like other Solzhenitsyn works, the book illustrates the difficulty of maintaining dignity within a system designed to strip its inhabitants of it.

== Characters ==
- Innokenty Volodin: A Ministry official whose phone call at the beginning of the book functions as a catalyst for much of the later action in the sharashka and eventually leads to his arrest.
- Gleb Nerzhin: A zek mathematician, 31. An autobiographical character. He is offered a position in a cryptography group, and refuses, even knowing this means he will be sent away from the sharashka.
- Nadezhda (Nadya) Nerzhina: Gleb's wife. Waited for eight years and became a student in Moscow because of him (Marfino is not far from Moscow) but is considering divorce because remaining married to a prisoner blocks her prospects for continuing studies or finding a job.
- Dmitry Sologdin: A zek designer, 36, a survivor of the northern camps now serving his second term. Sologdin is based on Solzhenitsyn's friend Dimitrii Mikhailovich Panin, who later wrote a book entitled The Notebooks of Sologdin. He works on a cryptographic machine in secret, but is found out and has to develop his invention so as not to get sent back.
- Lev Rubin: A zek philologist and teacher, 36, a Communist from youth, but nevertheless always ready for a good joke, even about socialism. Rubin is based on Solzhenitsyn's friend Lev Kopelev. He gets a position in a new group; his first task is to identify the man who called to warn Dr. Dobrumov not to share his medical discoveries with international colleagues.
- Valentin "Valentulya" Pryanchikov: A zek engineer and head of the acoustic laboratory, he is not taken seriously and behaves like a child, despite the fact that he is as old as Nerzhin.
- Rostislav "Ruska" Doronin: A zek mechanic, 23. Loves Klara, daughter of the prosecutor Makarygin. An informer himself, albeit a reluctant one, is beaten and sent away for helping fellow inmates find out who the other informers are.
- Klara Makarygina: Makarygin's youngest daughter, works in the vacuum laboratory and falls in love with Ruska.

== Editions ==
Cover of the 87-chapter version

Full, 96-chapter edition in English

Solzhenitsyn first wrote this book with 96 chapters. He felt he could never get this version published in the USSR, so he produced a "lightened" version of 87 chapters. In the long version, the diplomat Volodin's phone call (chapter 1) was to the US embassy, warning them of a Soviet attempt to get atomic bomb secrets. In the short version this call is to an old family doctor warning him not to share a new medicine with some French doctors he will visit. Another difference, in the long version Sologdin is a Roman Catholic, while in the short version his faith is not described.

Shortly after One Day in the Life of Ivan Denisovich was published, Solzhenitsyn submitted his "lightened" version for publication in the USSR, but it was never accepted. This version was first published abroad in 1968. An English version was first published in the United Kingdom by Collins and the Harvill Press in 1968. A paperback edition, still consisting of 87 chapters was published in 1988, translated from the Russian by Max Hayward, Manya Harari and Michael Glenny. The complete 96 chapter version (with some later revisions) was published in Russian by YMCA Press in 1978, and has been published in Russia as part of Solzhenitsyn's complete works. Excerpts from the full 96 chapter version were published in English by The New Yorker and in The Solzhenitsyn Reader. An English translation of the full version was published by Harper Perennial in October 2009, entitled In the First Circle rather than The First Circle.

== Adaptations ==
The Polish director Aleksander Ford made an English language film based on the novel in 1973, The First Circle. While it adhered closely to Solzhenitsyn's plot, the film was a critical and commercial failure.

The 1992 TV movie based on the novel, The First Circle, won Canada's Gemini Award for Best Photography in a Dramatic Program or Series, awarded to Ron Orieux. Directed by Larry Sheldon, it received nominations for best dramatic miniseries, best actor, best actress, and best writing in the category. It starred Victor Garber as the protagonist, Christopher Plummer, Robert Powell and Dominic Raacke, with F. Murray Abraham as Stalin. It was released on DVD.

In January 2006, the Rossiya Telekanal aired a miniseries directed by Gleb Panfilov. Solzhenitsyn helped adapt the novel for the screen and narrated the film.

== Translations ==
- Henry Carlisle and Olga Carlisle
- Michael Guybon (1968)
- Thomas P. Whitney (Harper & Row, 1968)

== Sources ==
- The First Circle, Aleksandr Solzhenitsyn (author), Thomas P. Whitney (translator), European Classics, pb.
- The Solzhenitsyn Reader: New and Essential Writings, 1947–2005: Aleksandr Solzhenitsyn, Edward E. Ericson Jr., Daniel J. Mahoney.
- The Oak and the Calf – Sketches of Literary Life in the Soviet Union, (memoir) by Alexandr I. Solzhenitsyn.
