= Jan Kurnakowicz =

Polish actor

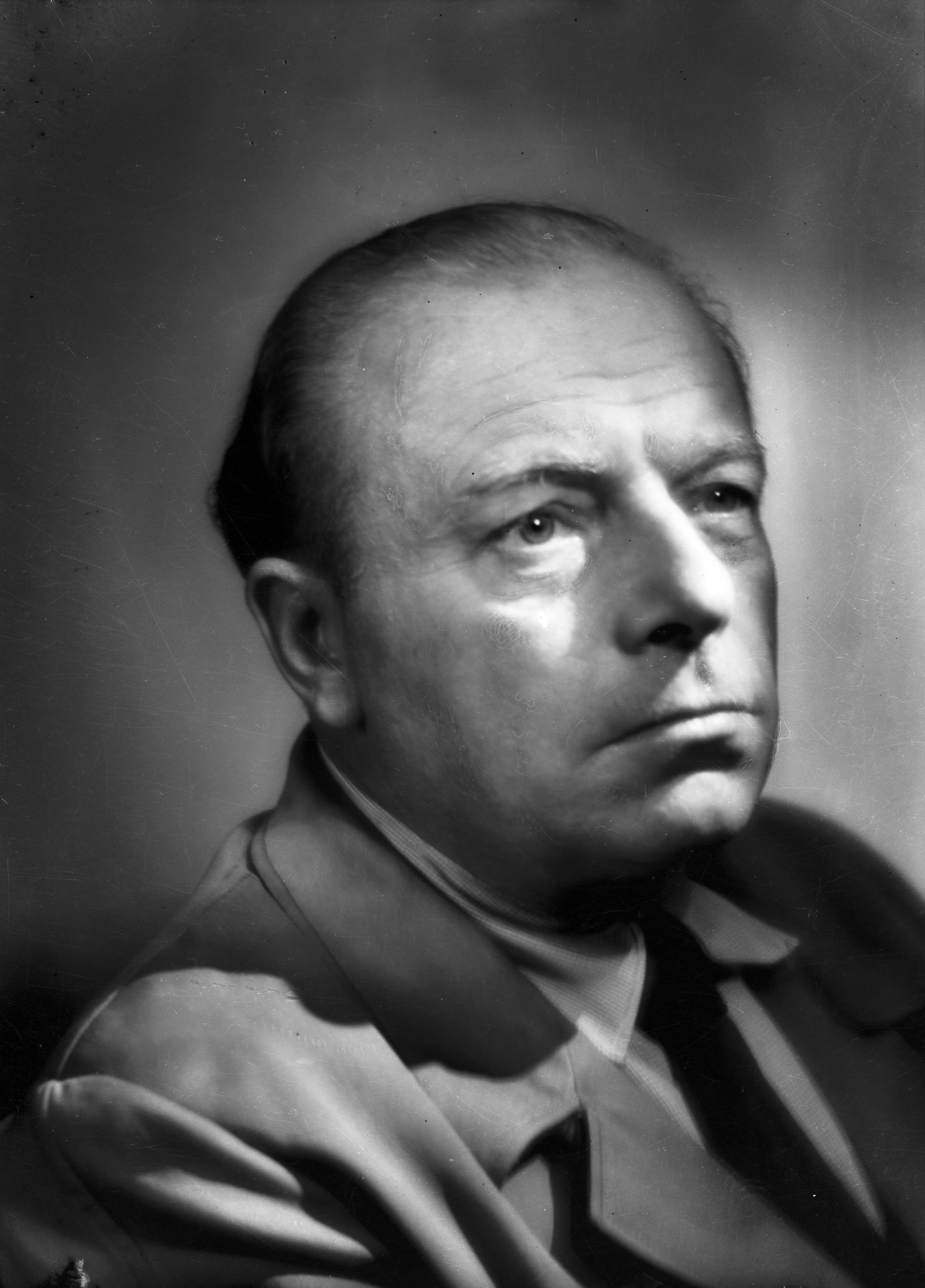
- Born: 27 January 1901; Wilno, Russian Empire (now Vilnius, Lithuania)
- Died: 4 October 1968 (aged 67); Warsaw, Poland
- Occupation: Actor
- Years active: 1929–1958

Jan Kurnakowicz (27 January 1901 – 4 October 1968) was a Polish film actor. He appeared in 24 films between 1929 and 1958.

== Selected filmography ==
- A Strong Man (1929)
- Prokurator Alicja Horn (1933)
- The Story of Sin (1933)
- Bohaterowie Sybiru (1936)
- Pan Twardowski (1936)
- Unvanquished City (1950)
- Warsaw Premiere (1951)
- A Matter to Settle (1953)
