= Igor Śmiałowski =

Polish actor (1917–2006)

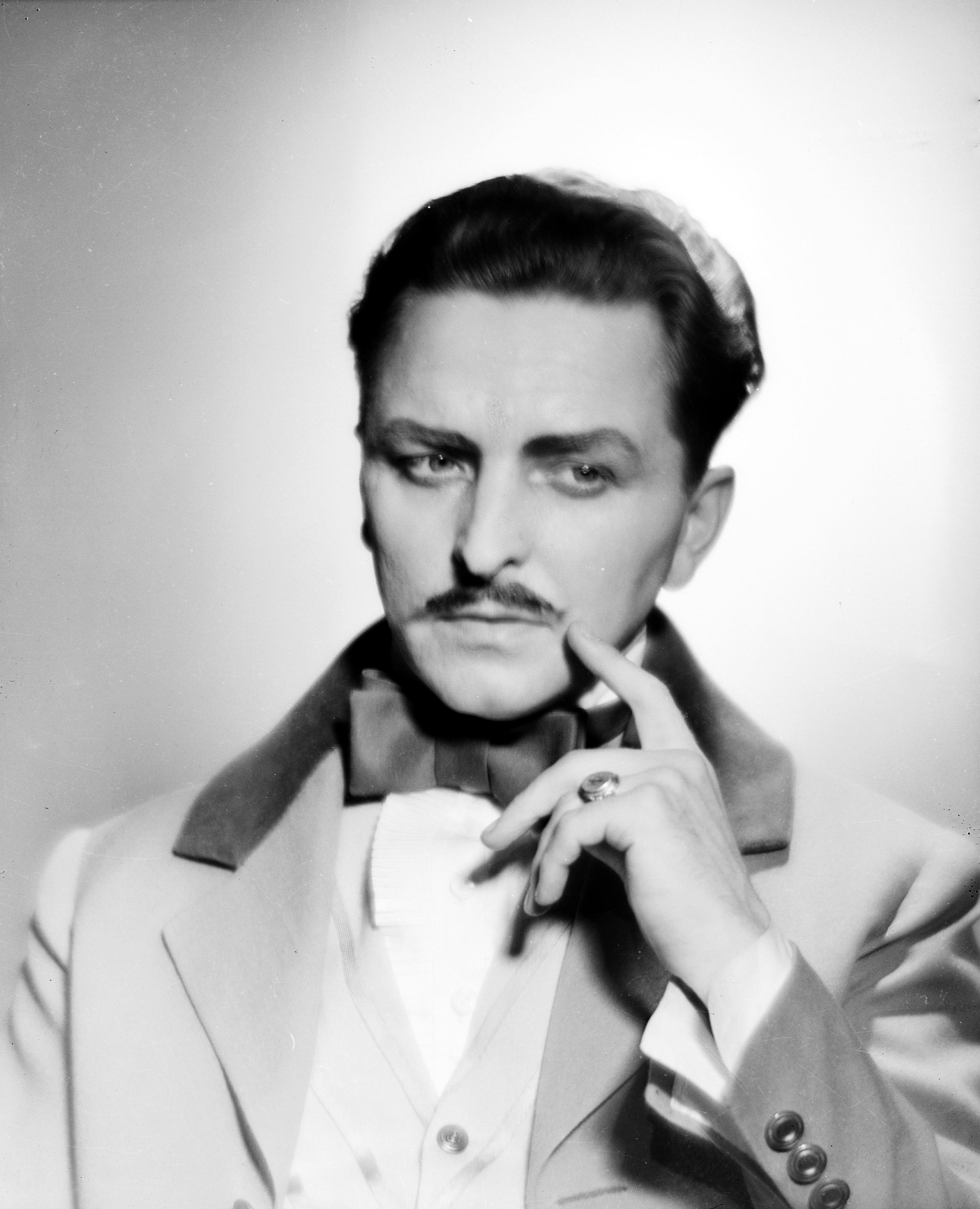
- Śmiałowski in 1953
- Born: 20 June 1917; Moscow, Russia
- Died: 16 June 2006 (aged 88); Warsaw, Poland
- Occupation: Actor

Igor Śmiałowski (born 20 June 1917, in Moscow, Russia and died 16 June 2006, in Warsaw, Poland) was a Polish actor.

== Selected filmography ==
- Ostatni etap (1947)
- Miasto nieujarzmione (1950)
- Warszawska syrena (1955)
- Stawka większa niż życie (television series) (1967–1968)
- Chłopi (television series) (1967–1968)
- Lalka (television series) (1977)
- Kariera Nikodema Dyzmy (television series) (1980)
- Znachor (1981)
- Awantura o Basię (1995), (1996)
