= The Knights of the Cross =

1900 novel by Henryk Sienkiewicz

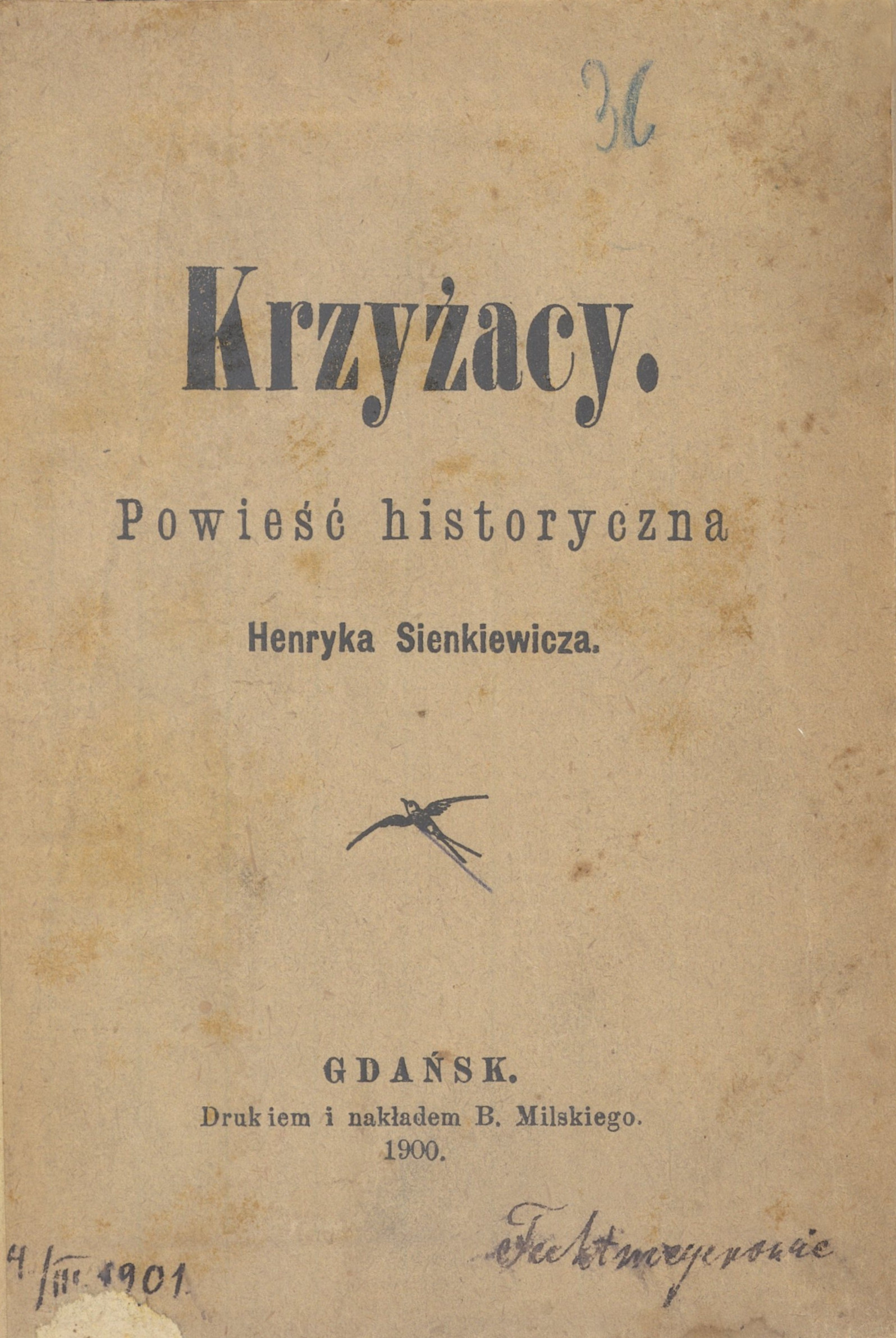
- Cover page of the 1900 print
- Author: Henryk Sienkiewicz
- Original title: Krzyżacy
- Language: Polish
- Genre: Historical novel
- Publisher: Tygodnik Illustrowany (serial); Wł. Anczyc & Co. Press (first novel)
- Publication date: 1900
- Publication place: Russian Poland
- Media type: Print (Hardback & Paperback)
- OCLC: 751659

The Knights of the Cross or The Teutonic Knights (Polish: Krzyżacy) is a 1900 historical novel by the Polish writer Henryk Sienkiewicz. Its first English translation was published in the same year as the original.

The book was serialized by the magazine Tygodnik Illustrowany between 1897 and 1899 before its first complete printed edition appeared in 1900. The book was first translated into English by Jeremiah Curtin, a contemporary of Henryk Sienkiewicz. The Teutonic Knights had since been translated into 25 languages. It was the first book to be printed in Poland at the end of World War II in 1945, due to its relevance in the context of Nazi German destruction of Poland followed by mass population transfers. The book was made into a film in 1960 by Aleksander Ford.

From May 2024, an autograph copy of the novel, used as the basis for the first edition, is presented at a permanent exhibition in the Palace of the Commonwealth in Warsaw.

== Historical background ==
The novel was written by Sienkiewicz in 1900, when the Polish state, after being partitioned among Russian, Austrian and German empires in the late 18th century, did not exist, and most Poles were living in the Russian occupation zone named Vistula Land, formerly Congress Poland. One of Sienkiewicz's goals in writing The Knights of the Cross was to encourage and strengthen Polish national confidence against the occupying powers. To circumvent Russian censorship, he placed the plot in the Middle Ages, around Prussia and the State of the Teutonic Order.

The history of the German Order of the Teutonic Knights is the backdrop for the story. From the 13th century onward, the Order controlled large parts of the Baltic Sea coast until its defeat at the 1410 Battle of Grunwald by the United Kingdom of Poland and Lithuania. The novel focuses extensively on the medieval life and customs in Poland in both the cities and the countryside.

In 1960, the novel was made into a Polish film of the same name by director Aleksander Ford, with Emil Karewicz as King Władysław II Jagiełło and Stanisław Jasiukiewicz as Grand Master Ulrich von Jungingen.

== Plot summary ==
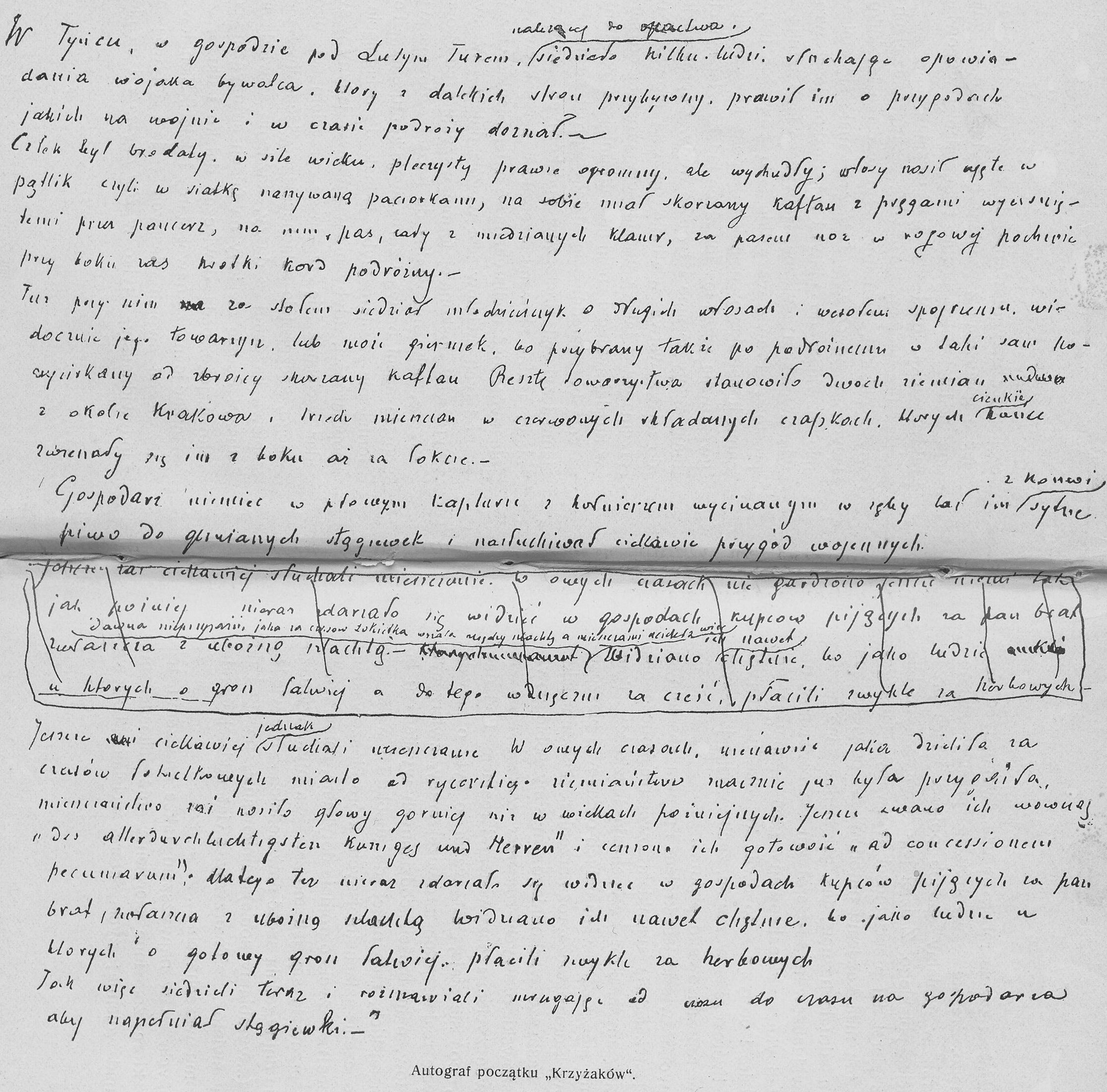
Copy of the manuscript of the first page by Henryk Sienkiewicz

Krzyżacy tells the story of a young nobleman, Zbyszko of Bogdaniec, who together with his uncle Maćko of Bogdaniec returns from the war against the Order (Knights of the Cross) in nearby Lithuania. In a tavern inn Zbyszko falls in love with the lovely Danusia, who is traveling with the court of the Duchess Anna. He swears to her his knight's oath and promises to bring her "three trophies" from the Teutonic Knights.

On his way to the royal city of Kraków, Zbyszko attacks Kuno von Liechtenstein, who is an official diplomatic delegate of the Teutonic Knights. The penalty is death. Yet, on the scaffold, Danusia saves him from execution when she jumps onto the platform in full view of the crowd, and promises to marry him, covering his head with her handkerchief (an old Polish tradition that carries with it a stay of execution if the couple wed). Zbyszko and Maćko return home to their estate, where they rebuild their mansion. After some time Zbyszko returns to Danuśka and marries her. However, she is soon treacherously kidnapped by four Teutonic Knights who want revenge – her father Jurand fought against the Germans. Jurand himself is soon captured by them, imprisoned and cruelly tortured and maimed.

Zbyszko's quest to find and save his kidnapped Danusia continues until, at long last, he rescues her. However, it is too late already. Danuta has been driven insane because of her treatment at the hands of her captors, and eventually dies. The long-awaited war begins. The combined forces of Poland and Lithuania under the command of Polish King Ladislaus Jagiello destroy the Teutonic Order in the monumental 1410 Battle of Grunwald. This battle signals the true terminal decline of the Teutonic Order.

== Plot description ==
=== Chapters 1 – 6 ===
The novel opens with some wealthy Poles conversing with a knight, Maćko of Bogdaniec, in the Savage Bull inn at Tyniec. The old knight and his young nephew, Zbyszko, are returning to their birthplace after fighting for King Vitold of Lithuania against the Knights of the Cross under the command of Konrad, the Grand Master and his brother, Ulrich of Jungingen, burgomaster of Sambia. Princess Anna Danuta of Mazovia's entourage arrives at the inn on their way to Cracow and it is here that Zbyszko falls under the spell of her ward, Danusia, and makes a vow to her to lay some German peacock plumes before her. Maćko and Zbyszko, after a quarrel, decide to apply to Prince Jurand of Spychów for service against the Germans as a great war is coming and accompany Princess Anna.

On the road they encounter a splendidly armed knight, who is praying. Behind him is a retinue and Zbyszko spots a German knight and attacks him with his lance but the first knight, Povala of Tachev, stops him and reveals that he is in the King's service escorting the German envoy and states that Zbyszko has committed a criminal offence and makes him swear to appear before a Cracow court. Maćko tries to beg forgiveness from the German, Kuno von Lichtenstein, but he insists they bow down before him which the Polish knights refuse to do as it goes against their honour.

Maćko and Zbyszko lodge with Povala at his house on Saint Anne Street. They discuss their recent campaigns with other Polish knights and attend the royal court of Jagełło and Jadwiga, who is pregnant. At dinner Lichtenstein reveals that he was attacked on the road to Tynets by a knight and Povala confirms it. The king is furious; he had accepted the Polish proposal to convert to Catholicism and marry the young Queen Jadwiga to halt the crusades against Lithuania by the Teutonic Knights. In a fit of fury Yagello commands to have Zbyszko's head cut off for disgracing him and he is led off to prison. At a court the death sentence is passed down by the Castellan of Cracow but execution delayed until Jadviga gives birth.

The baby dies and Jagełło, who has left Cracow, returns distraught and Maćko also returns from his journey to the Grand Master to beg forgiveness for Zbyszko's life. On the way, he is wounded by a German arrow from an ambush in the forest. A scaffold is erected and Princess Anna takes counsel with Yastrembets, Father Stanislav of Skarbimir and other learned men to seek a legal way out. On the day of the execution and, as Zbyszko is led out, Povala gives him Danusia who throws her veil over his head saying, ‘He is mine! He is mine!’. According to Slav custom, when an innocent maiden does this, it is a sign that she wants to marry him and he is saved from death.

The nephew and uncle decide to return to Bogdaniec where old Maćko needs to drink bears fat to remove the arrow-head. Jurand of Spychow, Danusia's father, comes to the court and Zbyszko meets him but is told he cannot marry his daughter and the father and daughter return to Tsehanov.

=== Chapters 7 – 14 ===
The two men meet their neighbour Zyh of Zgorzelitse near Bogdaniec who is hunting with his daughter, Jagienka, who admire Zbyszko for killing a huge bull bison with his crossbow. They settle into the old house and Jagienka comes to help them with furniture and food from her generous father. They also learn from her father that two young men are seeking her love, Vilk of Brozova and Stan of Rogov. Zbyszko goes to the forest to kill a bear in a nearby swamp and is nearly overcome by it but Jagienka assists in putting the fork into the ground so he can then kill it with his axe. Matko drinks the fresh fat and immediately starts to recover and finally the arrowhead is pulled out. On a beaver hunt, Jagienka asks Zbyszko about Danusia (after being told by her father about the veil incident). Later, the two men meet their distant relative, the abbot to whom their land is mortgaged, and all attend a church service with the nobility at Kresnia and Zbyszko fights with Vilk and Stan for which, as enemies of the abbot, Matko receives a bag of coin from him. However, Zbyszko's vow to Danusia angers the abbot who wishes him for Jagienka of whom he is very fond and the cleric leaves in a fit of anger.

=== Chapters 15 – 20 ===
Zbyszko and Maćko sets of for Mazovia with their captured Turks as an escort – Zbyszko to claim Danusia as his wife from her father. He is followed by the Cheh, named Hlava, of Jagienka's. They come across a man in the forest – a German fake relic seller called Sanderus who joins the retinue and tells Zbyszko that he has seen Danusia. On the road he encounters some knights of the cross, and meets De Lorche, a knight of Lorraine, who he challenges but Yendrek, the Polish escort, forbids the fight. They finally reach the Mazovian royal court of Prince Yanush which is on a hunting expedition at Kurpie where they find Danusia with Princess Anne. On the hunt a wild bull attacks the Princess's retinue and De Lorche and Zybshko defend it but both are injured and it is Hlava who kills it with his axe.

Danveld and Siegfried von Lowe, Brother Rotgier and Brother Gottfried are German envoys seeking Prince Yanush's punishment of Jurand for his deadly acts against their Order but he refuses. As a result, they hatch a plot to kidnap Danusia and use her as a ransom to capture her father. On their return to the border they are accompanied by De Fourcy who dislikes the conspiracy and the four men murder him and claim it was done by Hlava who rides up with Zbyszko's challenge; avoiding Danveld's knife, the Cheh returns to the hunting lodge to tell the true story.

=== Chapters 25 – 33 ===
Princess Anna receives a false letter from Jurand, written by Danveld, asking for Danusia's return to him at Spychow. Princess Anna decides they should get married first and the ceremony takes place and then Danusia departs. Zbyszko, when recovered, makes for Prince Yanush's castle at Tsehanov and help to save Jurand from death in a severe snowstorm; on his recovery he learns that Jurand never sent the letter and Jurand is certain the Knights of the Cross have abducted his daughter and the two men set of for Spychow. A sister of the Order and pilgrim come to Jurand and say he has to humble himself before the Order and make a ransom. After some days Zbyszko finds out from Tolima, Jurand's faithful old servant, that his master has left.

At the castle in Schytno, Jurand is forced to wait outside its gate all night as the onlookers jeer at him. The next morning he is allowed to enter and is forced to kneel dressed in a hempen bag before the comtur, Danveld. At last they bring his daughter to him but it is an idiot woman and, in his rage, he kills Danveld and massacres many of the jeering on-lookers before he is severely wounded and trapped in a net. Siegfried takes charge and sends Rotgier to Prince Yanush at Tsehanov to give a false version of the events. Zbyszko challenges Rotgier and kills him in their duel.

=== Chapters 34 – 50 ===
Zbyszko and De Lorche set out for Malburg to challenge the Knights there and learns from the priest at Spychow that Jurand has bequeathed all his lands to Danusia and, in case of her death, to Zbyszko. He also sends off a letter to Maćko via Hlava at Zgorzelitse. At Schytno Siegfried receives the body of Rotgier who is almost a son to him and in revenge has his mute servant, Diedrich, Jurand's tongue cut out, his one eye blinded and his right arm cut off and then he is let loose on the road. Maćko, after consulting with Hlava, decides to make for Spychow and takes Jagienka with him disguised as a young servant. At Plotsk Maćko befriends Lichtenstein in order to get a letter of safe conduct through the Knight's territory. They receive news about Zbyszko and decide to make for Schytno. On the road they encounter the blind Jurand and, deciding to take him back to Spychow, are able to restore him to some degree of health. At Spychow, they learn from Father Kaleb that Zbyszko, after some at Malborg where he fell under the protection of the Grand Master's brother, has joined Prince Vitold's forces. Maćko resolves to go to Warsaw.

=== Chapters 51 – 55 ===
War has broken out between the Grand Prince Vitold and the Knights over the latter's treatment of the Jmud people. The forces of Skirvoillo, the leader of the Jmud men, assemble and Maćko and Hlava are reunited with Zbyszko. Skirvoillo plans an attack on a castle and Zbyszko and Maćko are instructed the ambush forces coming out of the castle, Gotteswerder, to the support of a relief column. The Germans are wiped out, De Lorche is taken prisoner but freed by Zbyszko, and they learn from Sanderus, their prisoner, that Danusia is alive and has been carried off by Siegfried and a knight, Arnold von Baden. They pursue them and capture the Germans at some tarburners’ huts but Danusia is ill and has lost her mind. They in turn are captured by German relief forces – led by Arnold's brother, Wolfgang – and Zbyszko and Maćko agree a ransom with their captors, enabling Zbyszko and Danusia to follow Hlava who was fortunately instructed to take Siegried directly to Spychow. Hlava gets their first and recounts to Jagienka what has happened and takes his prisoner to Jurand who, by God's grace, frees him. Tolima accompanies the German to the border and the old man hangs himself from a tree, overcome by all his ill-deeds.

=== Chapters 56 – 63 ===
Just outside Spychow Danusia dies. Jurand lies on his bed unable to move but smiling all the time and Zbyszko falls into a deep torpor. Tolima is sent off with a ransom to free Maćko from Malborg but is himself imprisoned in a comtur's prison and Father Kaleb and De Lorche, who has come to Spychow to pray for Danusia, persuade Zbyszko to go. They learn about a meeting between King Jagiełło and the Grand Master at Ratsiondz and Zybshko learns from Hlava, who returns to Spychow, about Jagienka who has removed to the Bishop at Plotsk.

At Plotsk, Jagiełło is present and Prince Yanush and Prince Anna Danuta. Zbyszko see Jagienka who is now in the retinue of Princess Alexandra of Plotsk and she has changed greatly, transformed into a beautiful and elegant noblewoman. A great feast is held and the next day Prince Yanush commands Zbyszko and De Lorche to join his escort for the hunt. The meeting at Ratsiondz on an island on the Vistula takes place and goes badly for Grand Master Conrad and the Knights of the Order. Through Prince Yamont, Zbyszko is able to get his uncle's case raised by the King and he accompanies two other Polish knights to Malborg for the exchange of prisoners. Povala and particularly Zyndram, the leader of the Polish army, are unimpressed by the castle despite its huge size and the host of foreign knights present within its walls. Zbyszko and Maćko are reunited at last and the old man learns of Danusia's death.

=== Chapters 64 – 69 ===
On their return to Spychow, Jurand dies. A decision is made to leave Hlava, along with Jagienka's handmaiden Anulka with whom he is in love, in charge of Spychow as Maćko and Jagienka return to Bogdaniec with a large stock of money and valuables – mostly captured by Jurand from the Germans in battle – and Zbyszko goes off to join Prince Vitold's forces. Many months pass as they wait for Zbyszko's return and Maćko resolves to build a castle for his nephew.

=== Chapters 70 – 75 ===
Maćko and old Vilk are reunited after the death of the latter's son attacking a German castle. Zbyszko returns to Bogdaniec but lies ill on his bed and Maćko finally discerns that he loves Jagienka but does not know how to tell her. Finally, rising from his bed Jagienka takes responsibility for cutting his hair and the two are united. The couple live in Mochydoly while the castle is being built for them in Bogdaniec and Jagienka gives birth to twins, Maćko and Jaśko, and start to become renowned in the region once they move into the castle in its fifth year after all the outbuildings are completed.

=== Chapters 76 – 81 ===
In the same year war is afoot. Maćko leaves for Spychow and is gone for six months. On his return, Zbyszko learns that he went on to Malborg to challenge Lichtenstein to a duel but failed as the latter had been appointed grand comtur and was not present – instead he fought and killed Lichtenstein's relative of the same name.

A dispute is raised between Poland the Knights over the castle of Drezdenko that the greedy Order have captured and refused to return which Maćko thinks will result in all out war. Immense hunts are ordered by the Jagiełło to supply dried meat for the army and many Mazovians flee from Prussia to escape the Knights’ iron rule. Vitold is appointed to review the dispute and adjudges it to the Poles and Jmud again breaks out in rebellion. The armies of Lithuania and Poland are united along with the regiments of Mazovia against the Germans at their camp at Sviet. A general battle is coming and, after capturing the German fortress of Dambrova, the army makes camp and the next morning reach the fields of Grunwald where the armies halt to rest. As Yagello is about to start his second mass, scouts appear confirming the arrival of the Germans. During the bloody battle, The Grand Master Ulrich is killed by Lithuanian soldiers and many famous knights of the Western Order captured. Maćko searches the field for Kuno Lichtenstein and finds him amongst some captured prisoners and, after challenging him to a duel, kills him with his misericordia.

The novel ends with Maćko and Zbyszko returning to Bogdaniec where the former lives a long life with his four grandsons around him and the latter witnessing the Grand Master of the Order leaving Malborg with tears in his eyes from one gate as the Polish voevoda enters through another.

== Sources ==
The Knights of the Cross (Volumes I and II Illustrated Edition), Henryk Sienkiewicz, authorised and unabridged translation from the Polish by Jeremiah Curtin, Little, Brown and Company, Boston, 1918 (copyright 1918).

== Characters ==
- Zbyszko of Bogdaniec – a young impoverished nobleman, protagonist
- Maćko of Bogdaniec – Zbyszko's uncle
- Jurand of Spychów – a noble anti-Teutonic rebel and Danusia's father
- Danusia – courtier to the Duchess of Mazovia, Jurand's daughter and Zbyszko's wife
- Fulko de Lorche – a rich knight from Lotharingia who becomes close friends with Zbyszko
- King Władysław II Jagiełło – a historic person, king of the Kingdom of Poland between 1386 and 1434
- Siegfried de Löwe – the komtur of Szczytno and mastermind of the evil plan to kidnap Danusia
- Duchess Anna – the Duchess of Masovia
- Janusz I – the Duke of Masovia
- Kuno von Liechtenstein – the Order's delegate to the King of Poland, attacked by Zbyszko
- Jagienka of Zgorzelice – a young girl who falls in love with Zbyszko
- Hlawa – a Czech bodyguard of Zbyszko, and former servant of Jagienka
- Sanderus – a friar who sells indulgences and constantly butts heads with Hlawa (resembles Chaucer's Pardoner)

== Adaptations ==
- Knights of the Teutonic Order, a film directed by Aleksander Ford
- Knights of the Cross, a 2002 Polish video game
- Krzyżacy - The Knights of the Cross, a 2023 Chinese video game
