= Henryk Łowmiański =

Polish historian and academic

- Henrikas Lovmianskis
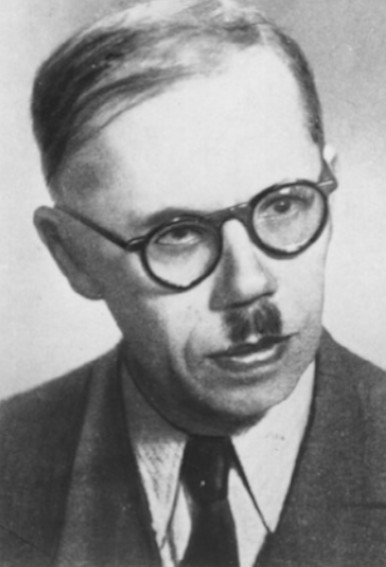
- Portrait of Łowmiański sporting a toothbrush moustache and horn-rimmed glasses
- Born: August 22, 1898; Dawgudzi, Kovno Governorate, Russian Empire
- Died: September 4, 1984 (aged 86); Poznań, Poznań Voivodeship, Polish People's Republic
- Spouse: Maria (née Plackowska)
- Parent(s): Konstanty and Kazimiera (née Rudzińska)

Academic background
- Education: Stephen Báthory University
- Thesis: "Wschody" miast litewskich w XVI wieku (1924)

Academic work
- Discipline: History
- Sub-discipline: Slavic history
- Institutions: University of Poznań; PAN; UAM
- Notable students: Juliusz Bardach; Marceli Kosman
- Notable works: Początki Polski

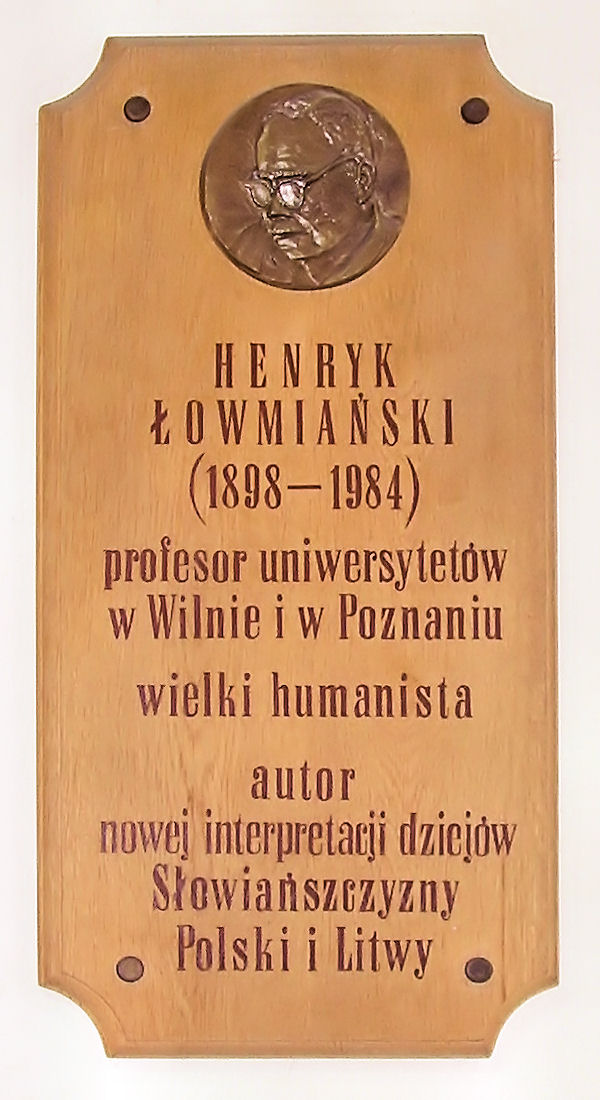
Commemorative plaque in the building of the Historic Faculty of Adam Mickiewicz University in Poznań.

Henryk Łowmiański (August 22, 1898 near Wilkomiria - September 4, 1984 in Poznań) was a Polish historian and academic who was an authority on the early history of the Slavic and Baltic people. A researcher of the ancient history of Poland, Lithuania and the Slavs in general, Łowmiański was the author of many works, including most prominently the six-volume monumental monograph Początki Polski (transl. The Beginnings of Poland).

== Scholarly years ==
Łowmiański was born to father Konstanty and mother Kazimiera née Rudzińska. After receiving his doctorate on the Wschody" miast litewskich w XVI wieku (transl. Beginnings of Lithuanian Cities) in 1924, Łowmiański became the first history Ph.D. in the University of Stefan Batory (USB). Prior the World War II, working as an academic archivist wrote a two-volume Studia nad początkami społeczeństwa i państwa litewskiego (1931–32), and a treatise Uwagi w sprawie podłoża społec-znego i gospodarczego Unii Jagiellońskiej (1934). In the meantime, he took over the Chair of the History of Eastern Europe in 1932 until the termination of the university in 1939.

In 1945, at the invitation of the Dean of the Faculty of Humanities of the University of Poznań, Kazimierz Tymieniecki, he took over the Chair of the History of Eastern Europe, later renamed the Chair of the History of the Nations of the USSR in 1951, until 1968. In 1946 was appointed as a full professor. He researched the early history of Poland and of the Eastern Slavs, publishing Podstawy gospodarczego formowania się państw słowiańskich (1953) and Zagadnienia roli Normanów w genezie państw słowiańskich (1957) before his most important work, the six-volume monumental monograph Początki Polski between 1963 and 1984.

From 1953 he was the head of the medieval history department of the newly established Institute of History of the Polish Academy of Sciences (PAN) and from 1956 an ordinary academic member of the PAN. In the years 1951-1956 / 1957 he was the head of historical departments at the Adam Mickiewicz University in Poznań (UAM), and in the years 1956 / 1957-1968 he was the director of the Institute of History at UAM. He was also a member of number of scientific societies, including Society of Friends of Science in Wilno (1935), Shevchenko Scientific Society (1936), Poznań Society of Friends of Learning (1945) among others.

Besides major books, his bibliography includes around 300 items, and the first volume of his selected works about Lithuanian and Belarusian history Studia nad dziejami Wielkiego Księstwa Litewskieg was published in 1983. According to Maciej Siekierski, the "continuing timeliness and scholarly value of these works are a tribute to the great historian". According to Stanisław Alexandrowicz, Łowmiański had a universal authority already during his lifetime, being considered as an expert on historical sources, the history of Lithuania, Slavic and Baltic people in the Middle Ages, economic and social relations of medieval Poland, and statehood formation in Central and Eastern Europe. During the mourning ceremony by the academic community, reputable historian Gerard Labuda assessed his role in the Polish historiography as equal to Jan Długosz and Joachim Lelewel.

== Personal life ==
His wife was Maria Łowmiańska (1899–1961), a Polish philologist with historical interests, also graduate from USB.

== Awards ==
He was awarded the Officer's Cross of the Order of Polonia Restituta (1951), the Order of the Banner of Labour, 2nd class (1954), and on the occasion of the 20th anniversary of the People's Republic of Poland, he received the first-degree state award. In 1974, he was awarded the Order of the Builders of People's Poland.

== Important works ==
- "Wschody" miast litewskich w 16 wieku (1923–1924)
- Studia nad początkami społeczeństwa i państwa litewskiego (2 vol., 1931–32)
- Uwagi w sprawie podłoża społec-znego i gospodarczego Unii Jagiellońskiej (1934)
- Prusy pogańskie (1935) [English edition: The Ancient Prussians (1936)]
- 'Wcielenie Litwy do Polski w 1386 r. (1937)
- Podstawy gospodarczego formowania się państw słowiańskich (1953)
- Zagadnienia roli Normanów w genezie państw słowiańskich (1957)
- Geneza państwa ruskiego jako wynik procesu wewnętrznego (1962)
- Początki Polski (6 vol., 1963–1985)
- Studia nad dziejami Wielkiego Księstwa Litewskiego (1983)
- Studia nad dziejami Słowiańszczyzny, Polski i Rusi w wiekach średnich (1986)
- Religia Słowian i jej upadek (w. VI-XII) (1979)
- Polityka Jagiellonów (1999)
