= Dytryk =

Dytryk (Dietrich or Theoderic) (born after 992 - died after 1032) – Polish duke in 1032.

Dytryk was a paternal grandson (patruelus) of Mieszko I and his second (or third?) wife Oda of Haldensleben, the daughter of Dietrich of Haldensleben, the Margrave of the Northern March. Dytryk was thus named after his maternal grandfather Dietrich of Haldensleben. The precise identity of Dytryk's father is uncertain. Mieszko had had three sons by Oda, Mieszko, Świętopełk, and Lambert. Of these, Świętopełk is suspected to have died before the composition of the Dagome iudex in 991, probably young and without offspring. This leaves Mieszko and Lambert as the likely candidates for Dytryk's father, with Mieszko preferred, presumably for being the eldest.

In July 1032, following the murder of Duke Bezprym of Poland, Emperor Konrad II brokered a partition of Poland at Merseburg, dividing it between Bezprym's brothers Mieszko II Lambert and Otto and their nephew Dytryk. The partition proved short-lived, and Otto's death and Dytryk's exile allowed Mieszko II Lambert to briefly reunify the country in 1033. Dytryk's subsequent fate is unknown, and but he died after July 1032 or 1033.

== Bibliography ==
- Balzer O., Genealogia Piastów, Kraków 1895.
- Jasiński K., Rodowód pierwszych Piastów, Poznań 2004, s. 126–127.
- Labuda G., Pierwsze państwo polskie, Kraków 1989, ISBN 83-03-02969-X, s. 54.
- Rymar E., Rodowód książąt pomorskich, Szczecin 2005, ISBN 83-87879-50-9.
- Szczur S., Historia Polski. Średniowiecze, Kraków 2002, ISBN 83-08-03272-9.
