= Świętopełk Mieszkowic =

Late 10th-century Polish prince

Świętopełk Mieszkowic (b. ca. 980 – d. bef. 991?), was a Polish prince member of the House of Piast.

He was the third son of Mieszko I of Poland but the second born from his second marriage with Oda, daughter of Dietrich of Haldensleben, Margrave of the North March.

== Life ==
Nothing is known about his first years of life. Świętopełk is only named in the chronicles of Thietmar of Merseburg; he was omitted in the document "Dagome iudex" (ca. 991/92), which names his parents and full-brothers Mieszko and Lambert, a fact which indicates that he may have been dead by that time, in or before 991.

Another hypothesis stated that the absence of Świętopełk from the "Dagome iudex" was because he was already in Western Pomerania, which was granted to him as a fief and in consequence he was the ancestor of the earlier Dukes of Pomerania; however, this theory is now discarded by the majority of modern historians, who linked the first Pomeranian Dukes with the Piast Dynasty through a daughter of either Mieszko I or Baltic Žemužil .
