= Kingdom of Poland =

Monarchy in Central Europe from 1025 to 1795

Kingdom of Poland: Królestwo Polskie (Polish); Regnum Poloniae (Latin)
- 1025–1569–1795
- Coat of arms on a seal of Przemysł II (1295-1296, during Polish fragmentation)

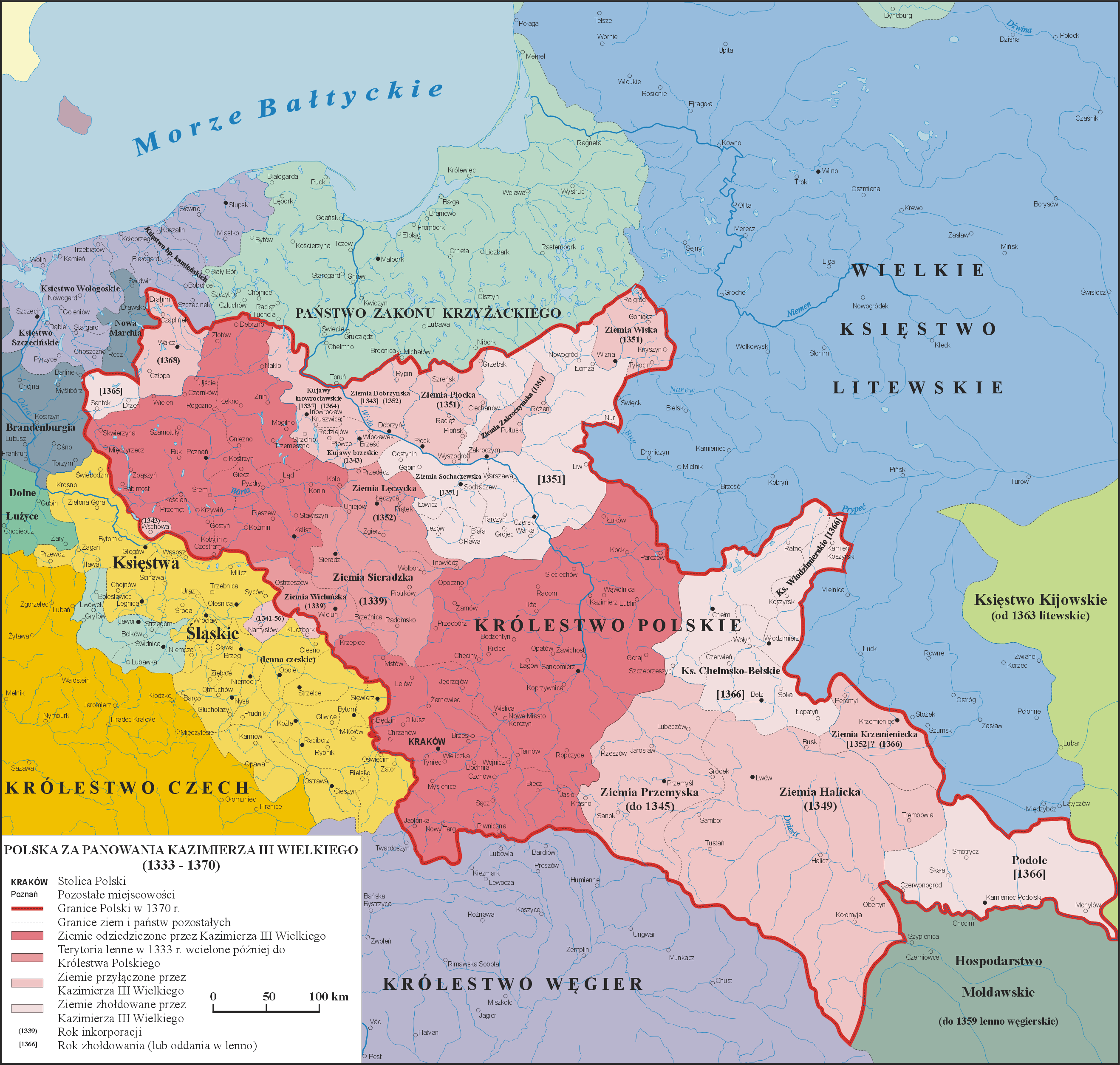
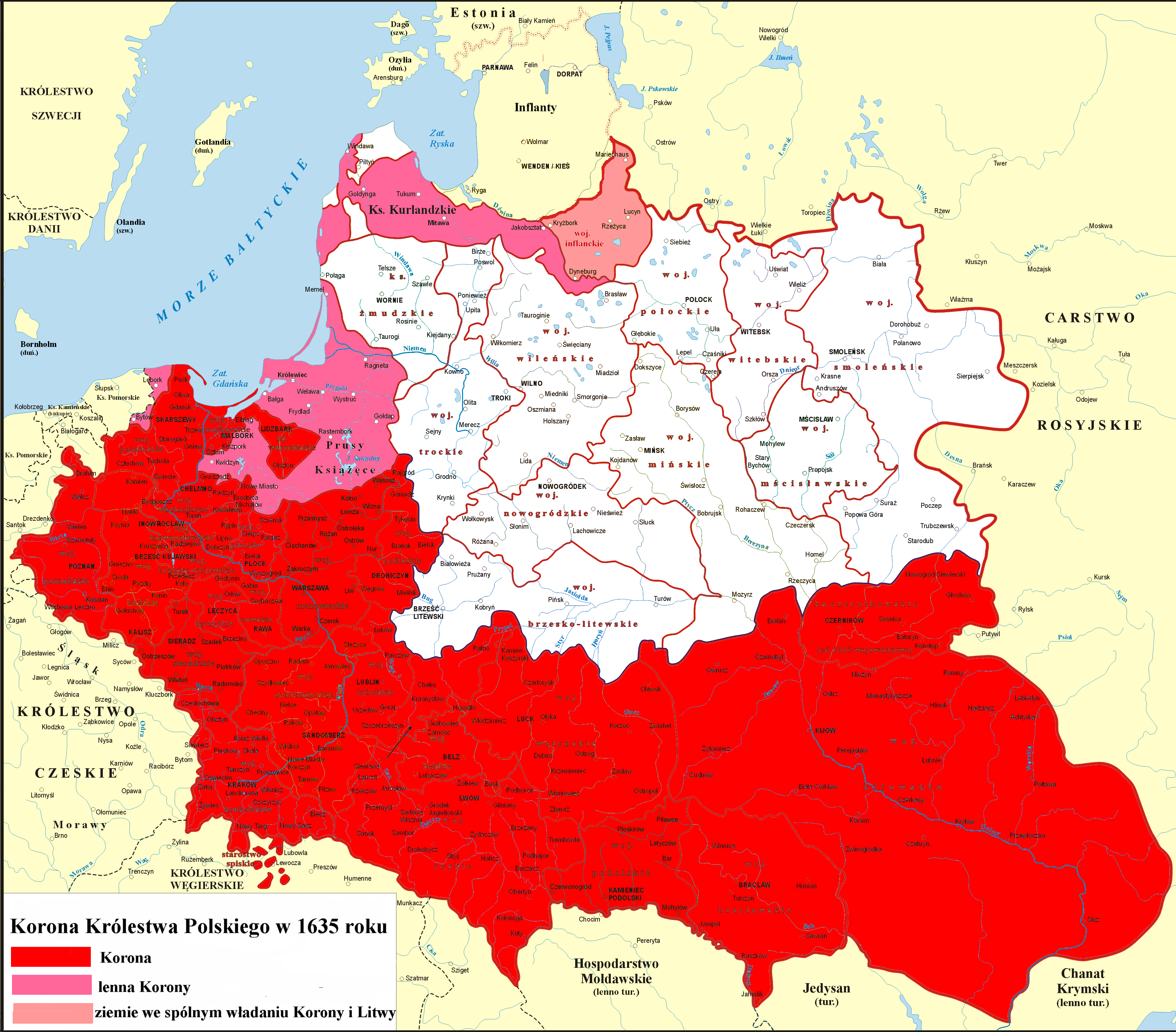
- Capital: Gniezno (until 1038) Kraków (until 1793) Warsaw (until 1795)
- Official languages: Old Polish, Latin
- Religion: Catholicism (institutional)
- Demonym: Polish
- Government: Hereditary monarchy Feudal monarchy Elective monarchy
- Historical era: Middle Ages; Early Modern
- Currency: Denar; Grosz; Ducat; Florin; Złoty
Preceded by
Civitas Schinesghe
Succeeded by
Kingdom of Prussia
Habsburg monarchy
Russian Empire

The Kingdom of Poland (Polish: Królestwo Polskie; Latin: Regnum Poloniae) was a state in Central Europe during the medieval and early modern periods from 1025 until 1795 (since 1 July 1569, it became the part of Polish-Lithuanian Commonwealth).

== Background ==
The West Slavic tribe of Polans, who lived in what is today the historic region of Greater Poland, gave rise to a state in the early 10th century, which would become the nascent predecessor of the Kingdom of Poland. Following the Christianization of Poland in 966, and the emergence of the Duchy of Poland during the rule of Mieszko I, his eldest son Bolesław I the Brave inherited his father's dukedom and subsequently was crowned as king.

== History ==
=== Establishment ===
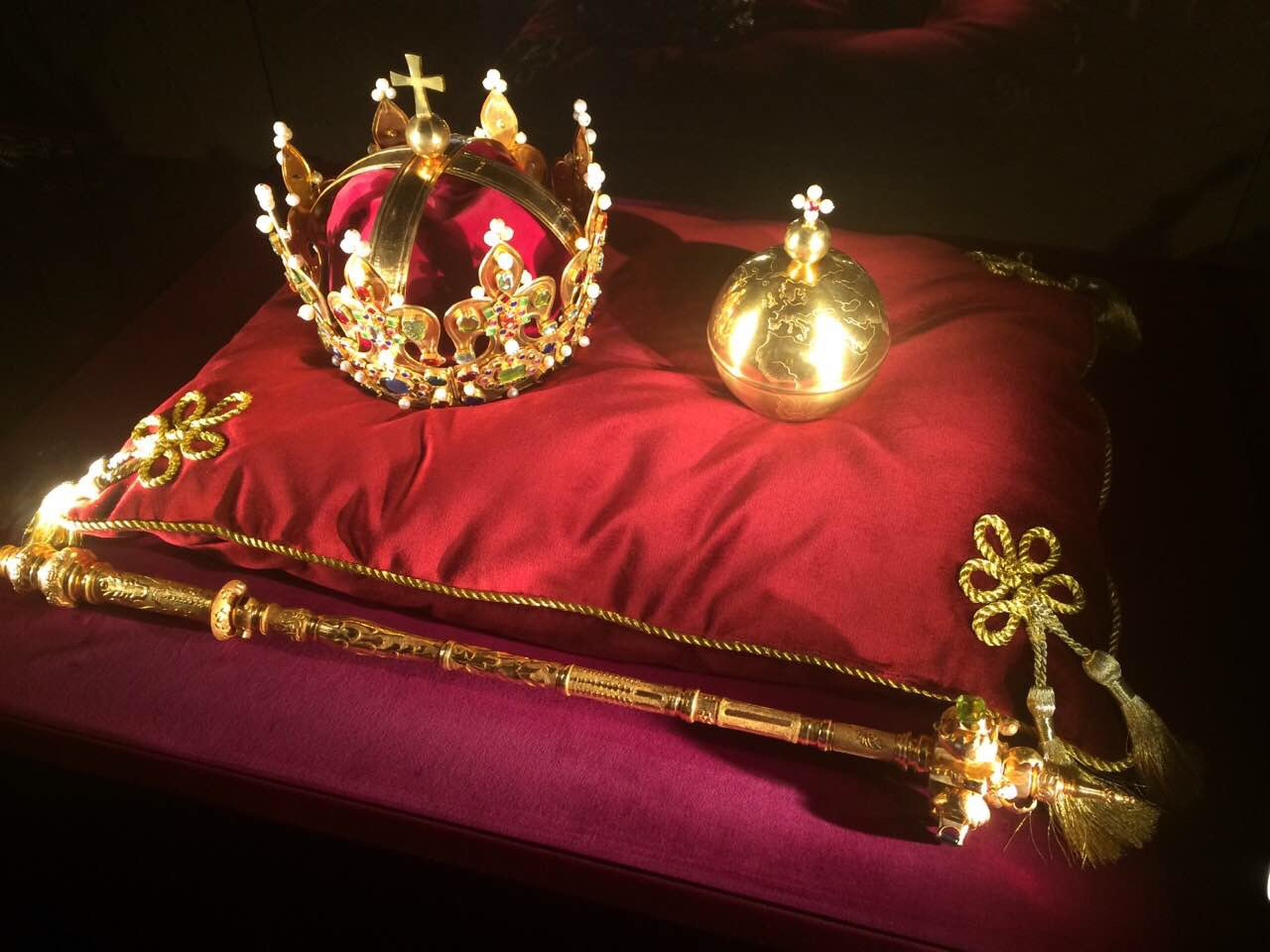
Crown of Bolesław I the Brave, along with royal regalia

In 1025, Bolesław I the Brave of the Piast dynasty was crowned the first King of Poland at Gniezno Cathedral, elevating Poland from a duchy to a kingdom with the approval of Pope John XIX. Following the death of Bolesław, his son Mieszko II Lambert inherited the crown and a vast territory after his father, which included Greater Poland (with Mazovia), Lesser Poland, Silesia, Pomerania, Lusatia, Moravia, Red Ruthenia, and Upper Hungary. However, in 1031, he was forced to renounce the title and flee the country when a series of peasant uprisings broke out in what became known as the pagan reaction, and Yaroslav I the Wise, the Grand Prince of Kiev, invaded the country from the east while Mieszko II was in Lusatia fighting the Holy Roman Emperor, Conrad II. Yaroslav I installed his ally, the half-brother of Mieszko II, Duke Bezprym, as the ruler of Poland. However, as a result of the upheavals, the kingdom suffered territorial losses and was effectively reduced to a duchy.

Casimir I the Restorer managed to reunite parts of the kingdom following the crisis and moved the capital to Kraków. However, he failed to reinstitute the monarchy due to opposition from the Holy Roman Emperor. In 1076, Bolesław II the Bold, with the support of Pope Gregory VII, regained the royal crown but was later excommunicated and banished from the kingdom in 1079 for murdering his opponent, Bishop Stanislaus of Szczepanów. In 1079, Władysław I Herman, who never pursued kingship, took over the reins after the expulsion of Bolesław II. Władysław I was disinterested in becoming king and the country was effectively run by wojewoda Sieciech.

=== Feudal fragmentation ===
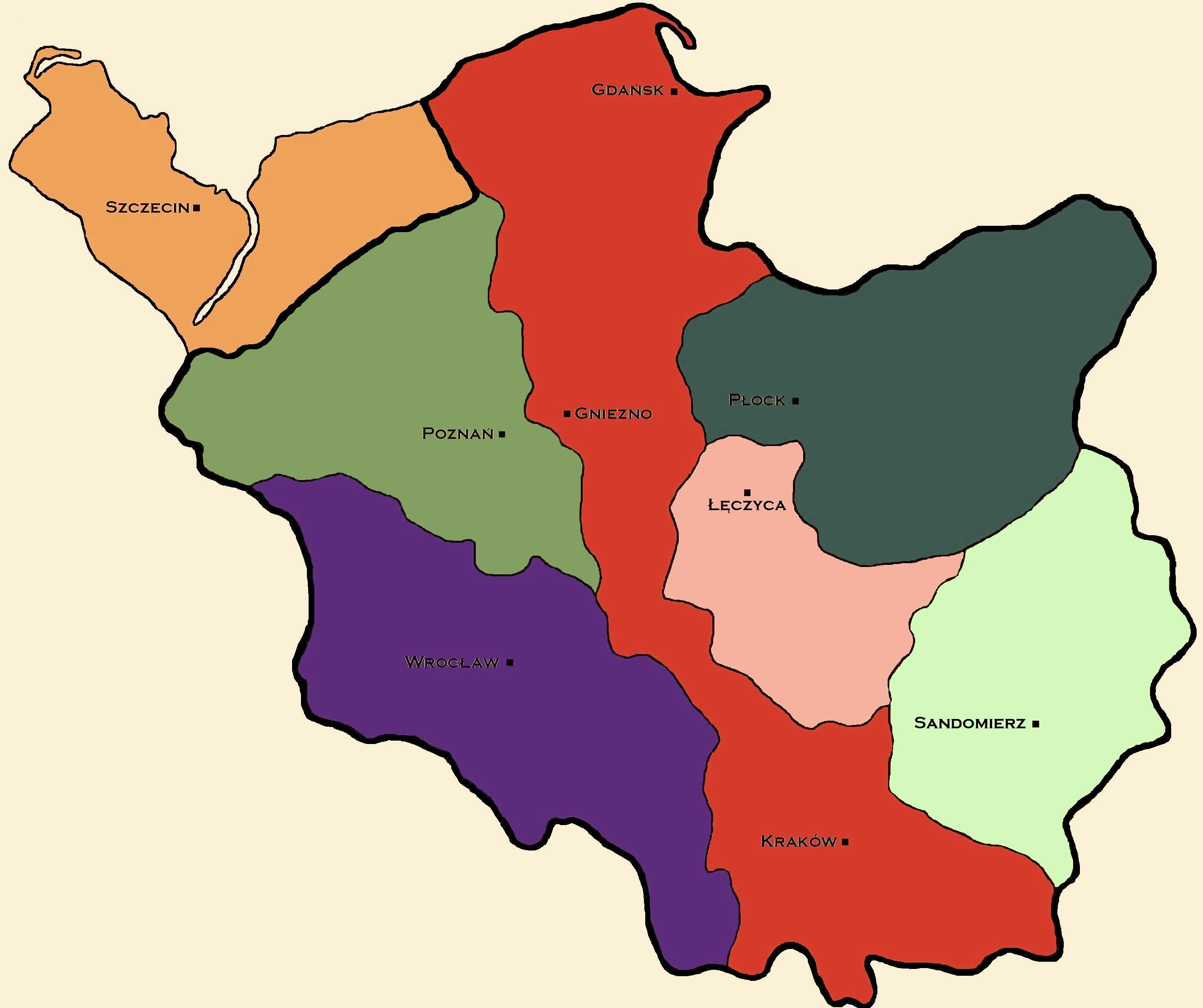
The fragmentation of Poland in 1138

In 1102, Bolesław III Wrymouth became the ruler of Poland. Unlike Władysław I, Bolesław III proved to be a capable leader who restored the full territorial integrity of Poland but ultimately was not able to obtain the royal crown due to continued opposition from the Holy Roman Empire. Upon his death in 1138, the country was divided between his sons into the duchies of Greater Poland, Lesser Poland, Masovia, Silesia, Sandomierz, and a Pomeranian vassal. As a result, Poland entered a period of feudal fragmentation that lasted for over 200 years.

During the first half of the 13th century, the Silesian Piasts attempted to restore the kingdom. Henry the Bearded undertook efforts to reunite the fragmented duchies through a combination of political maneuvering and conquest. He also undertook efforts towards the coronation of his son, Henry II the Pious, and negotiated with other Polish dukes and the Holy Roman Emperor, Frederick II of Hohenstaufen, to this end. Henry II, continued his father's efforts, but the first Mongol invasion in 1241 and his death at the Battle of Legnica, abruptly halted the unification process.

=== Reunified kingdom ===
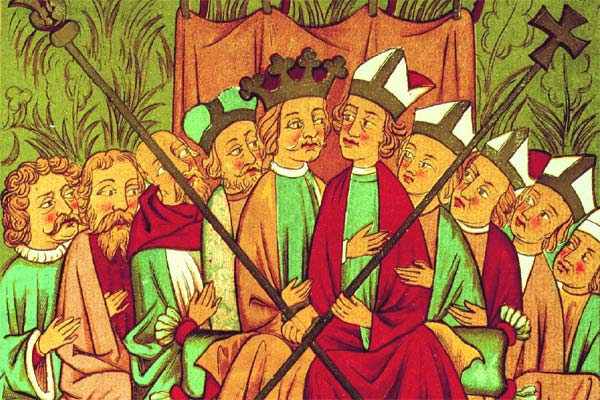
Depiction of a royal assembly (Wiec) in the reign of Casimir III, 1333-1370

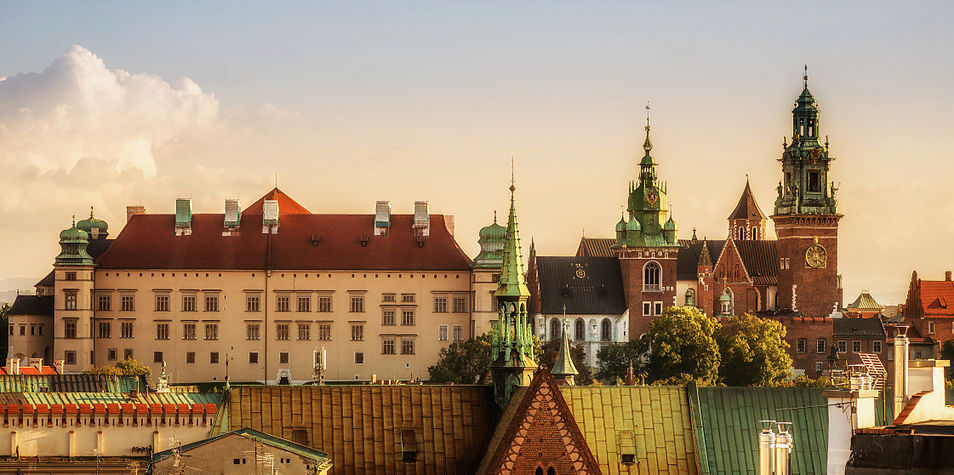
Wawel Castle in Kraków was the residence of the Polish kings from 1038 until 1598.

The next attempt to restore the monarchy and unify the Polish kingdom would occur in 1296, when Przemysł II was crowned as the King of Poland in Gniezno. The coronation did not require papal consent as the title of king was already instituted in 1025. However, his reign was short-lived, as he was murdered by assassins sent by the margraviates of Brandenburg. After the killing of Przemysł II, next to take the title of king was Wenceslaus II of Bohemia from the Czech Přemyslid dynasty, who reigned until 1305. Following a vacancy that lasted until 1320, the Kingdom of Poland was fully restored under Władysław I the Elbow-High, who was crowned at the Wawel cathedral in Kraków, and then subsequently strengthened by his son Casimir III the Great, who expanded into Red Ruthenia. However, he had to renounce his claims to Silesia in order to secure peace with the Holy Roman Empire. Casimir III is the only Polish king to receive the title "Great", and his reign was marked by substantial developments in the kingdom's urban infrastructure, civic administration, and military strength. After his death on 5 November 1370, the rule of the Piast dynasty would come to an end.

Following the death of Casimir III, who died without an heir, Louis I of Hungary from the House of Anjou became king in 1370. The period of his transitional rule also marked the rise of the nobility in the political life of the country. When Louis I died in 1382, his daughter Jadwiga took over the throne as King of Poland. Her advisors negotiated with Jogaila of Lithuania, concerning a potential marriage to Jadwiga. Jogaila pledged to convert to Christianity and signed the Union of Krewo in 1385. The agreement also heralded a change in the legal status of the Polish realm to that of a Crown of the Kingdom of Poland, which was a political concept that assumed unbroken unity, indivisibility and continuity of the state. According to this concept, the Kingdom of Poland ceased to be the patrimonial property of a monarch or dynasty, and became a common good of the political community of the Polish kingdom. After the conclusion of the union, Queen Jadwiga married Grand Duke Jogaila, who was crowned as King Władysław II Jagiełło on 4 March 1386, an event that marked the beginning of the Jagiellon dynasty.

=== Crown of the Kingdom of Poland ===
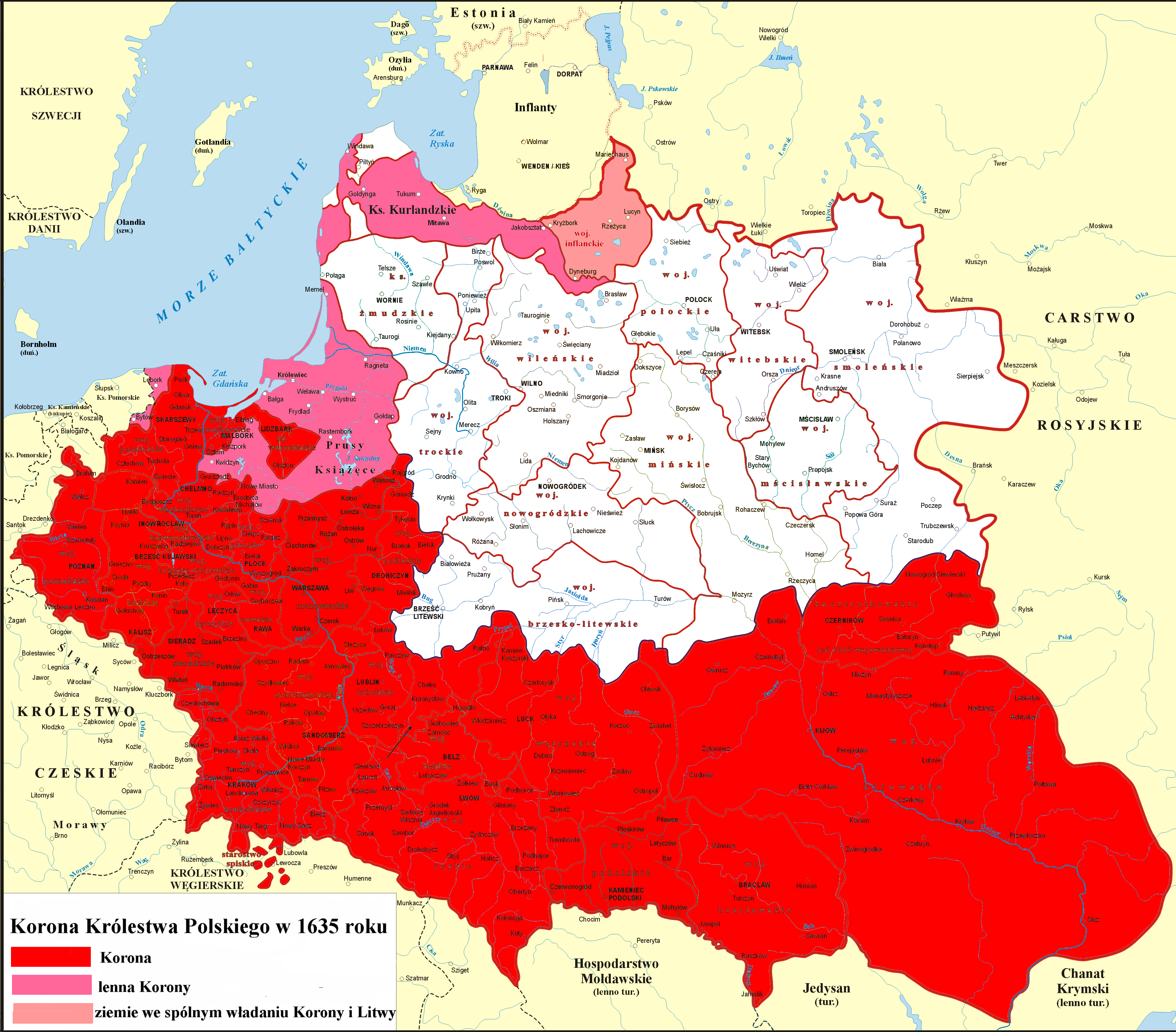
The Polish–Lithuanian Commonwealth in 1635. Crown of the Kingdom of Poland Grand Duchy of Lithuania Fiefdoms of the Polish Crown (Duchy of Prussia; Duchy of Courland and Semigallia) Joint administration by Poland and Lithuania (Inflanty Voivodeship)

In the second half of the 14th century and the rule of Louis I, the doctrine and the concept of the Crown of the Kingdom of Poland emerged. It emphasized the role of the Crown as the true, indivisible, and permanent sovereign of the Kingdom, distinct from the person of the reigning monarch, as well as emphasizing the unity of the Polish lands lying outside the borders of the kingdom. The king ceased to be the owner of the state and became merely its ruler; his authority did not derive from heredity and was limited.

Alongside the King, the Crown's authority was also shared by the developing parliament, known as the Sejm, which included representatives of the kingdom's nobility. This growing influence was expressed through participation in the election of rulers. Initially, from the early 15th century onward, only the most powerful magnates sitting in the Senate took part, confirming the succession within the ruling Jagiellonian dynasty. After the childless death of Sigismund Augustus in 1572, the procedure of the "free election" took shape, in which every nobleman had the right to participate and the list of candidates was no longer limited to a single ruling family. The last free election took place in 1764, at which Stanisław August was elected.

From the late 14th century, the Kingdom of Poland entered into close relations with the Grand Duchy of Lithuania, appointing as co-ruler, through his marriage to Queen Jadwiga, the grand duke Władysław Jagiełło. In 1413, the Union of Horodło was concluded, in which, alongside the monarchs, the lords of both polities also took part. The personal union, interrupted only occasionally, was transformed into a real union and the creation of a joint state, the Polish–Lithuanian Commonwealth, referred to by contemporaries mostly as the Kingdom of Poland and the Grand Duchy of Lithuania. Over time, a custom emerged of referring to the Polish part of the joint state as "the Crown" and the Lithuanian part as "the Grand Duchy". During this period, the Commonwealth, and with it the Kingdom of Poland, entered into personal unions with the Kingdom of Sweden (1592–1599) and the Electorate of Saxony (1697–1763).

Under the partition agreements between Prussia, the Habsburgs, and Russia, the Kingdom of Poland ceased to exist. According to the 1797 convention, it was decided that the Kingdom of Poland was "from now on and forever abolished", and none of the three courts would seek its restoration. During the Napoleonic period, efforts to rebuild the Kingdom, supported by France, emerged, but in practice only the Duchy of Warsaw was created. At the Congress of Vienna, the Kingdom of Poland was established, tied to Russia through the person of its ruler and largely dependent on it. After subsequent uprisings, its autonomy was gradually reduced, but it formally existed until 1915. After the occupation of central Polish lands by German and Austrian forces, the creation of a German-dependent Kingdom of Poland, administered by the Regency Council, was proclaimed. After Poland regained independence, the Council transferred authority to a democratically elected government, and no further real attempts were made to restore the monarchy in Poland.

== See also ==
- List of Polish monarchs
- Monarchism in Poland
- History of Poland in the Middle Ages
- Culture of medieval Poland
- History of Poland
- Duchy of Poland

== Bibliography ==
- Dąbrowski, Jan (1956). Korona Królestwa Polskiego w XIV wieku. Studium z dziejów rozwoju polskiej monarchii stanowej (in Polish). Zakład im. Ossolińskich.
- Frankel, Henryk (1946). Poland. The Struggle for Power 1772–1939. London: Lindsay Drummond.
- Frost, Robert (2015). The Oxford History of Poland-Lithuania. The Making of the Polish-Lithuanian Union, 1385–1569. Oxford: Oxford University Press. ISBN 978-0-19-820869-3.
- Kieniewicz, Stefan (1998). Historia Polski 1795–1918 [History of Poland 1795–1918] (in Polish).
- Markiewicz, Mariusz (2002). Historia Polski 1492–1795.
- Szczur, Stanisław (2002). Historia Polski. Średniowiecze. Kraków: Wydawnictwo Literackie. ISBN 978-83-08-03272-5.
