= Civitas Schinesghe =

Country in central Europe (960–1025)

Civitas Schinesghe Państwo Gnieźnieńskie (Polish)
- c. 960–1025
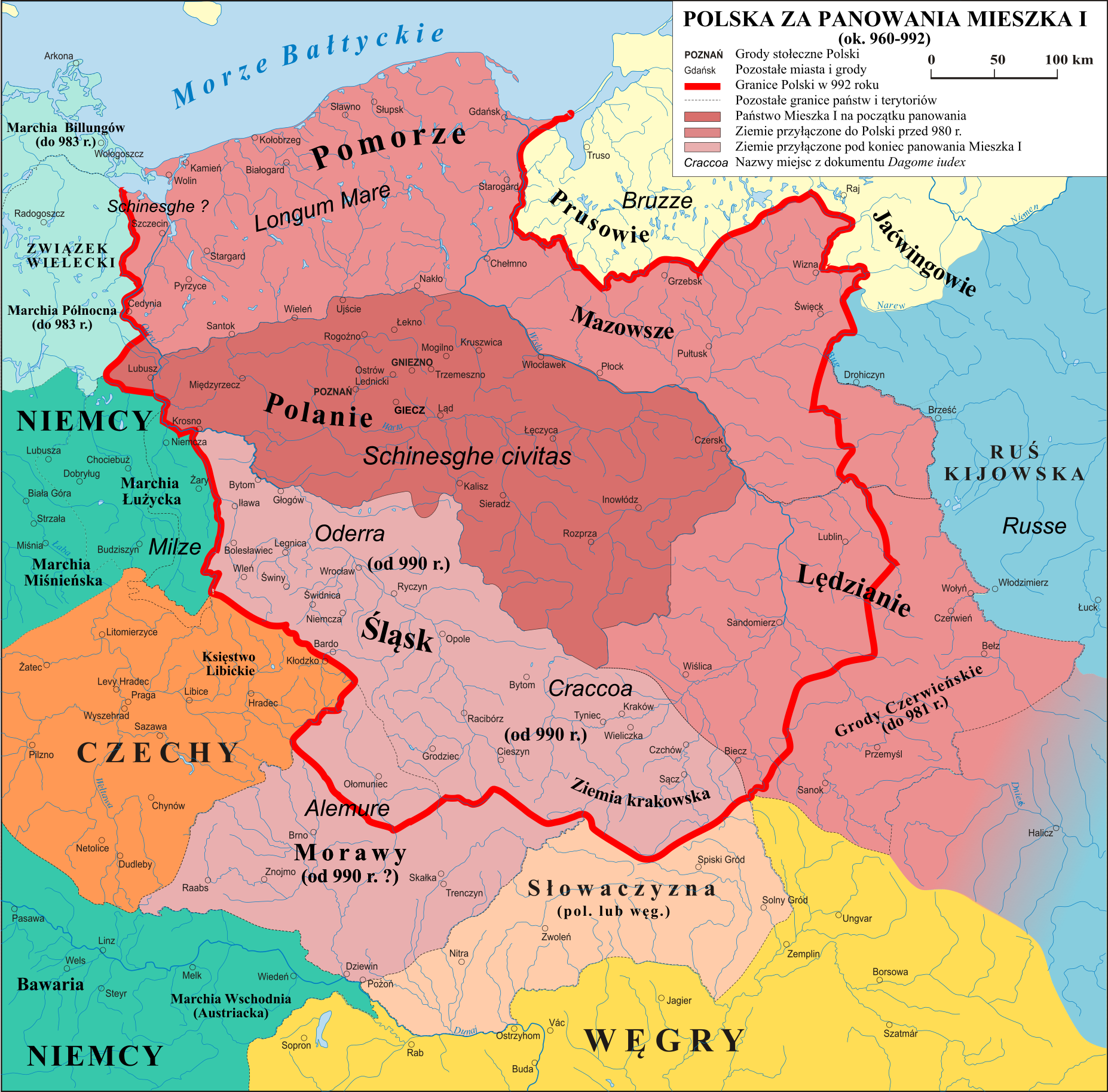
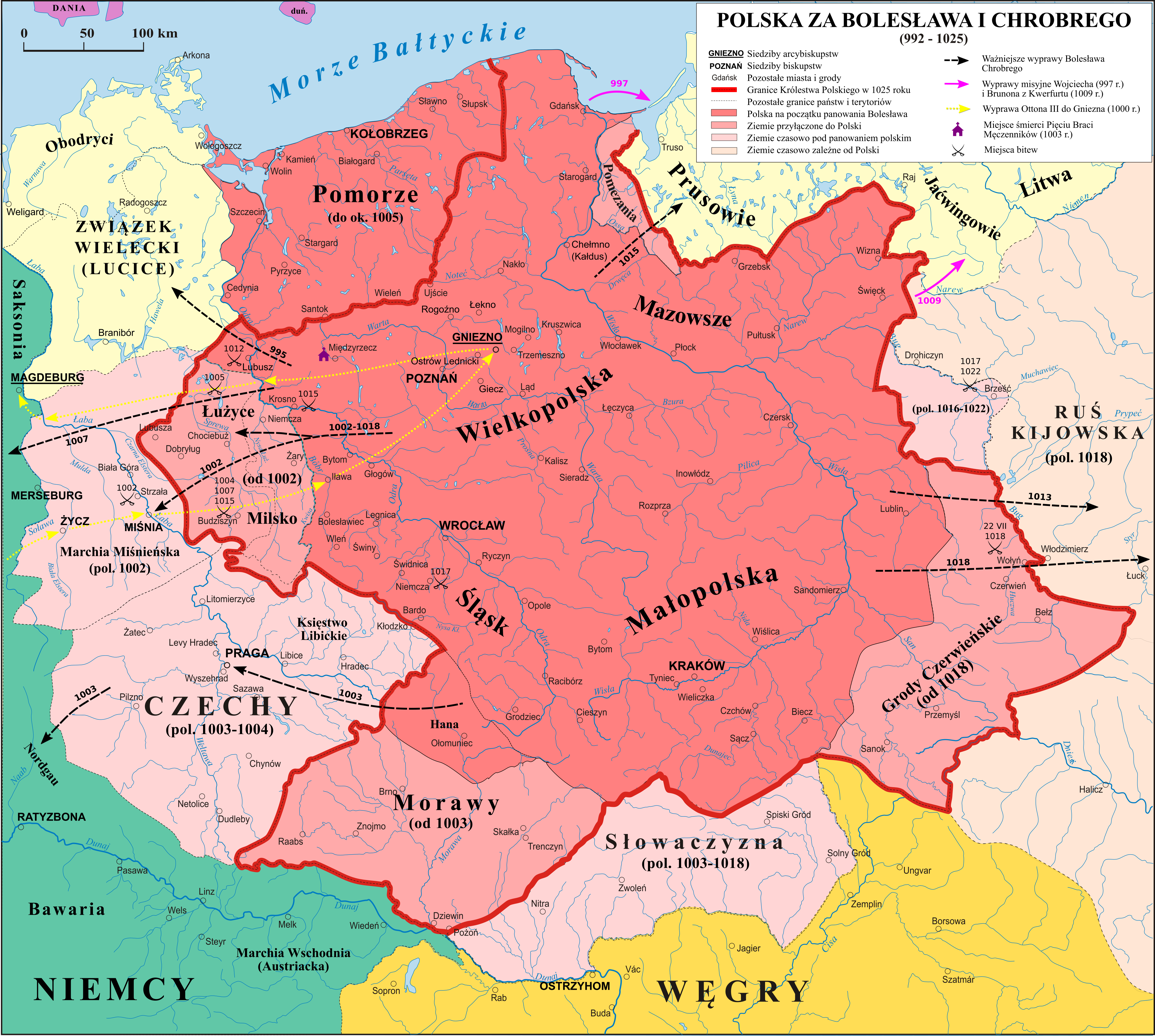
- Capital: Gniezno
- Common languages: Lechitic languages (including Old Polish)
- Religion: Catholicism (institutional); Slavic paganism
- Government: Monarchy
- Monarch
  - c. 960–992: Mieszko I
  - 992–1025: Bolesław I the Brave
- History
  - Baptism of Poland: c. 960
  - Coronation of Bolesław I the Brave: 1025
Preceded by	Succeeded by
Polans; Lechitic tribes	Kingdom of Poland

Civitas Schinesghe (Ecclesiastical Latin: [ˈtʃivitas skiˈnesɡe]; Polish: Państwo Gnieźnieńskie), commonly referred to in historiography as the Duchy of Poland, was the early medieval polity centered around Gniezno and ruled by the Piast dynasty. It emerged in the 10th century and is considered the predecessor state of the Kingdom of Poland, which was formally established in 1025.

== Etymology ==
Civitas Schinesghe, meaning "Gniezno State", is the earliest recorded name connected with Poland as a political entity. The term originates from around 991–992 and survives in a later papal regesta known as the Dagome iudex (compiled c.1080). In this document, Piast duke Mieszko I and his second wife, Oda of Haldensleben, placed unam civitatem in integro, que vocatur Schinesghe ("a whole state, which is called Schinesghe") under the protection of the Holy See.

Although the proper Latin name for Poland, Polonia, came into use somewhat later and does not appear in the document, the term Schinesghe is generally understood to refer to Gniezno, one of the principal gord strongholds of the West Slavic Polans. Philological analysis suggests that the spelling "Sc" may represent a scribal substitution for "K", which in turn was phonetically interchangeable with "G." On this basis, the original form might have been closer to "Khinesghe" or "Kninesne." Another interpretation views the name as an imperfect Latinization of the Slavic phrases hrady knezske or grody książęce, meaning "ducal gords" (fortified settlements of a duke).

== History ==
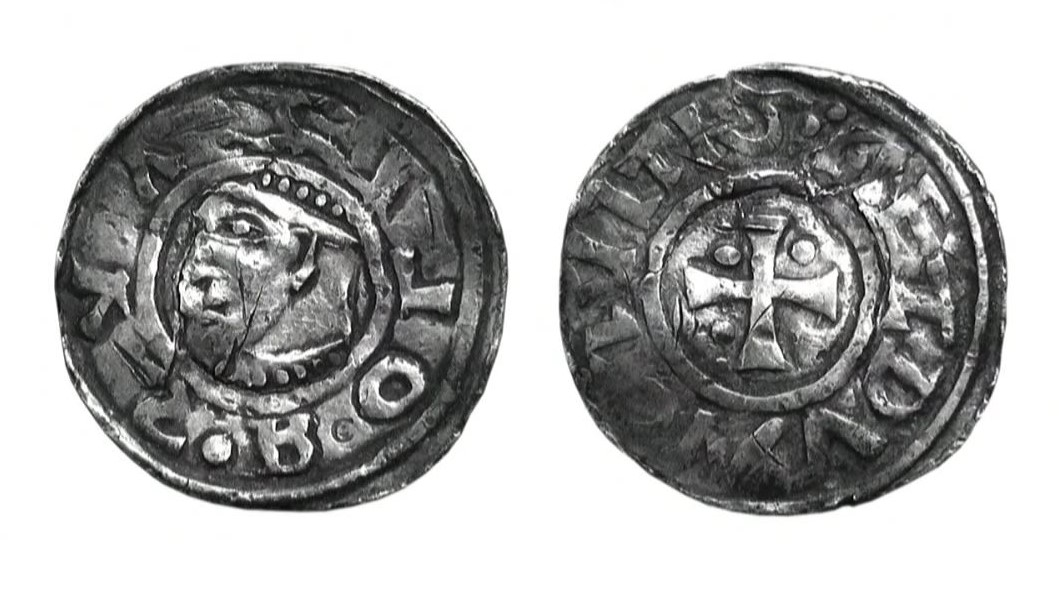
One of polish coins minted during the reign of Bolesław I the Brave, with the inscription CIVITAS GNEZDVM, c. 992-1000

In 966, Mieszko I, the ruler of the Polans, accepted Christianity through the auspices of the Roman Church in the Baptism of Poland. According to Gallus Anonymus, it was Mieszko's first wife, Dobrawa, the daughter of Boleslaus I, Duke of Bohemia, who convinced her husband to convert to Christianity. Also, the chronicler, Thietmar of Merseburg, attributed Mieszko's conversion to Dobrawa's influence. The Baptism also had political significance and was most likely intended to bring Mieszko's state closer to the Duchy of Bohemia and to prevent future attacks by the Holy Roman Empire in an attempt to Christianize Mieszko's lands by force. Subsequently, Mieszko's realm was recognised by the papacy and accepted as part of Christendom. In 968, a missionary bishopric was established in Poznań. The regesta titled Dagome iudex first defined Poland's geographical boundaries with its capital in Gniezno and affirmed that the state was under the protection of the Popes.

Following the death of Mieszko I, his eldest son, Bolesław I the Brave, became the next Duke of Poland in 992. Bolesław I quickly consolidated his rule, expelling his stepmother, Oda, and half-brothers from Poland. He also expanded the borders of the early Polish state by taking Lusatia, Moravia, Upper Hungary, and Red Ruthenia. In 1000, he organized the Congress of Gniezno and obtained the right of investiture from Otto III, the Holy Roman Emperor, who assented to the creation of three additional bishoprics in Kraków, Kołobrzeg, and Wrocław and an archdiocese in Gniezno. During the meeting of the two rulers, Otto also bestowed upon Bolesław I royal regalia and a replica of the Holy Lance, which were later used at his coronation as the first King of Poland in 1025, when Bolesław I received permission for his coronation from Pope John XIX, an event that elevated Poland from a duchy to a kingdom.

== Territory ==
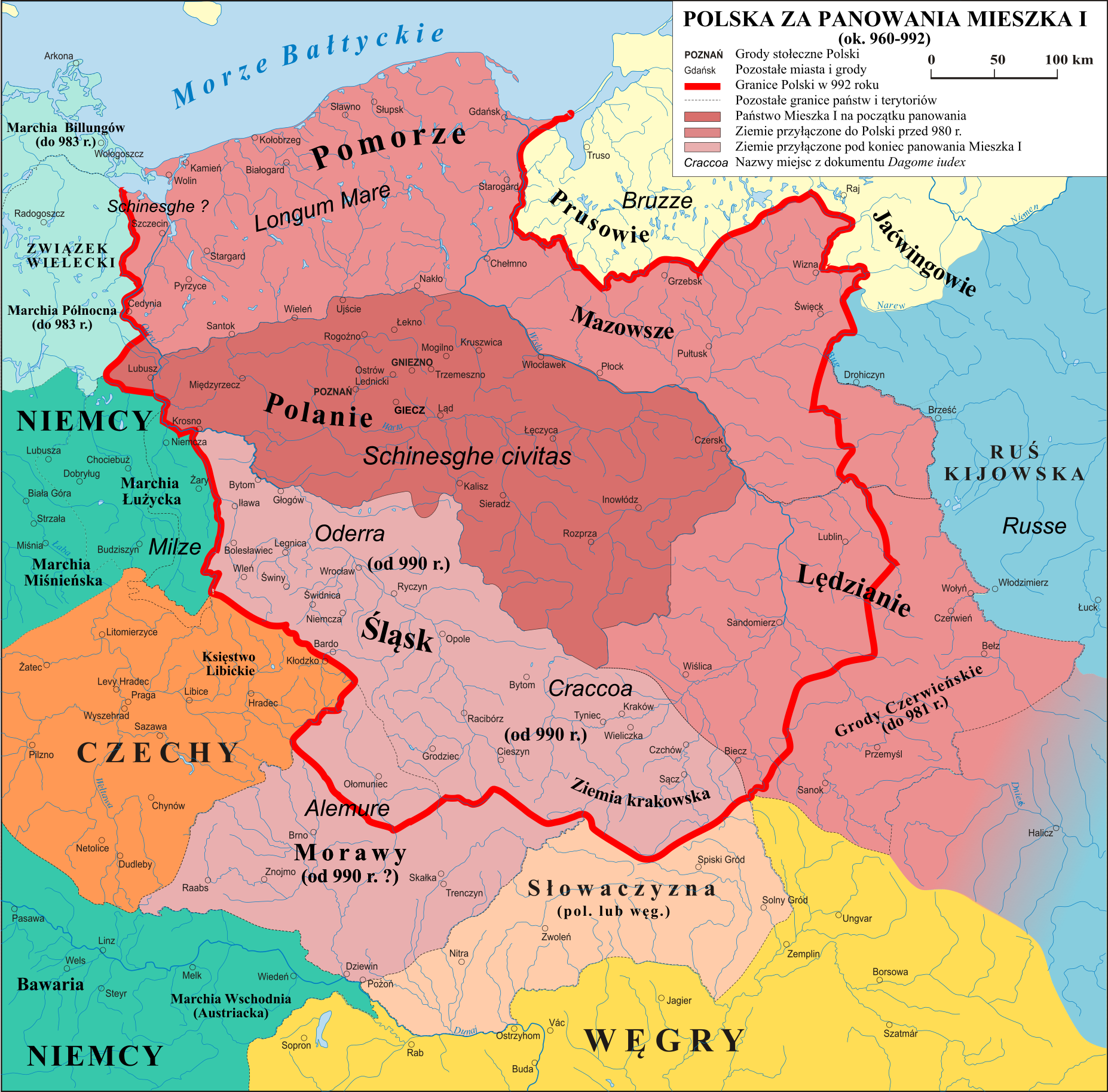
Poland under the rule of Mieszko I, c. 960–992

The Dagome iudex outlines the borders of the Polish realm:

- sicuti incipit a primo latere longum mare, "as it starts from the first side of a long sea" (presumably the Pomeranian coast – on the Baltic Sea)
- fine Bruzze 'end Bruzze' – "along the Prussian borders" (settlement area of the Old Prussians)
- usque in locum, qui dicitur Russe – "up to a place called Rus'" (east of Masovia)
- et fines Russe extendente usque in Craccoa – " Rus' ends and extending into Kraków"
- et ab ipsa Craccoa usque ad flumen Odde recte – "and from there right along the Oder river"
- in locum, qui dicitur Alemure, "in a place called The Alemure" (sometimes identified as Olomouc in Moravia or possibly Oława in Silesia)
- et ab ipsa Alemura usque in terram Milze recte intra Oddere – "to the Milceni lands" (part of the Imperial Margraviate of Meissen)
- et exinde ducente iuxta flumen Oddera usque in predictam civitate Schinesghe. – "and from its borders along the Oder to aforementioned Schinesghe."

== See also ==
- List of Polish monarchs
- Poland in the Early Middle Ages
- Culture of medieval Poland
- History of Poland
