= Mieszko Mieszkowic =

10th-century House of Piast Polish prince

Mieszko Mieszkowic (979/984 – aft. 992/95), was a Polish prince, and a member of the House of Piast.

He was the second son of Mieszko I of Poland, but eldest born from Mieszko's second marriage to Oda, daughter of Dietrich of Haldensleben, Margrave of the North March.

== Life ==
Little is known about his first years of life. Mieszko's first appearance is in the document "Dagome iudex" (ca. 991/92), along with his parents and brother Lambert. The purpose of the document was to protect Mieszko's and Lambert's inheritance from their older half-brother Bolesław I the Brave, who isn't named there. After Mieszko I's death (25 May 992), a war began between Bolesław I and his half-brothers. There is disagreement among historians as to the course of the conflict; the struggle may have lasted only a few weeks or may have only finished in 995.

In the end, Bolesław I took control over all the territories of his father and expelled his stepmother and half-brothers from Poland to Germany. Mieszko's further fate is unknown, but in 1032 a certain Dytryk (son of either Mieszko or his brother Lambert) returned to Poland and took control over part of the country after the fall of Mieszko II Lambert. Dytryk's reign was short-lived: in 1033, he was deposed and expelled by Mieszko II, who reunited all Poland.
