= Lambert Mieszkowic =

Late 10th-century Polish prince

Lambert Mieszkowic (c. 981 – after 992/95), was a Polish prince of the House of Piast.

He was the fourth son of Mieszko I of Poland, the third born from his second marriage with Oda, daughter of Dietrich of Haldensleben, Margrave of the North March.

== Life ==
Nothing is known about his early years. Lambert's first appearance was in the document called "Dagome iudex" (ca. 991–92), along with his parents and brother Mieszko. After Mieszko I's death (25 May 992), the war began between Bolesław I and his half-brothers for the paternal heritage, a dispute which according to some historians lasted only a few weeks, and according to others, only finished in 995. Despite the tensions between both parties, Bolesław I's first son with Emnilda of Lusatia was probably named after him; it's expected that the choice of this name for his son was an expression of warming relations between Bolesław I and his stepmother Oda.

At the end, Bolesław I took control of the country and expelled his stepmother and half-brothers from Poland to Germany. Lambert's further fate is unknown; previously he was identified with Lambert, Bishop of Kraków (d. 1030), but now this identification is contested.

In 1032, a certain Dytryk (son of either Lambert or his brother Mieszko) returned to Poland and took control of part of the country after the fall of Mieszko II Lambert, but his reign was short-lived; in 1033, he was deposed and expelled by Mieszko II, who reunited all Poland.
