= Dagobert =

- Gender: Male

Dagobert or Taginbert is a Germanic male given name, possibly from Old Frankish Dag "day" and beraht "bright". Alternatively, it has been identified as Gaulish dago "good" berxto "bright".

== Animals ==
- Roi Dagobert (born 1964), thoroughbred racehorse

== People ==
- Dagobert I (605–639), Frankish king
- Dagobert II (died 679), Frankish king
- Dagobert III (699–715), Frankish king
- Dagobert (died 675), son of the Frankish king Childeric II
- Mieszko I (died 992), Duke of Poland, who adopted Christianity and was possibly baptised as Dagobert.
- Dagobert of Pisa (died 1105), Archbishop of Pisa and first Latin Patriarch of Jerusalem
- Dagobert (1222–1232), son of Louis VIII of France
- Luc Siméon Auguste Dagobert (1736–1794), French general
- Erich Dagobert von Drygalski (1865–1949), German geographer, born in Königsberg
- Dagobert Peche (1887–1923), Austrian artist and metalworker designer
- Dagobert Biermann (1904–1943), Resistance fighter against the Nazis
- Père Dagobert, Capuchin friar
- Dagobert D. Runes (1902–1982), philosopher, translator, and friend of Albert Einstein
- Dagoberto Campaneris Blanco, Major league baseball player
- Dagobert Banzio (1957–2017), Ivorian politician
- Dagobert Dang (born 1958), Cameroon footballer
- Dagobert Frey (1883–1962), Austrian art historian and thief
- Dagobert Friedländer (1826–1904), banker and politician
- Dagobert von Gerhardt (1831–1910), German soldier, poet, and novelist
- Dagobert Neuffer (originally Neumann; 1851–1939), German stage actor and theatre director
- Dagobert Sekullic (1889– 1965), Austrian equestrian
- Dagobert, Archbishop of Sens
- Dagobert Thometschek, German rower

== Popular culture ==
- Dagobert IX, a Galactic Emperor in Isaac Asimov's Foundation and Empire
- The German, Dutch and Hungarian name of Disney character Scrooge McDuck
  - hence, the pseudonym of extortionist Arno Funke
- In Swedish, Norwegian and French, the cartoon character Dagwood Bumstead is named Dagobert with various surnames
- The song "Le bon roi Dagobert" (song), named after Dagobert I
- Dagobert, name of the dog in the French translation of Enid Blyton's The Famous Five books (Timmy in the original)
- Good King Dagobert, a 1984 French-Italian film directed by Dino Risi
- Dagobert, a character in the novel The Wandering Jew by Eugène Sue.

== Food ==
- Dagobert (sandwich), a sandwich of Belgian cuisine
