= Dagome iudex =

Early historical document relating to Poland

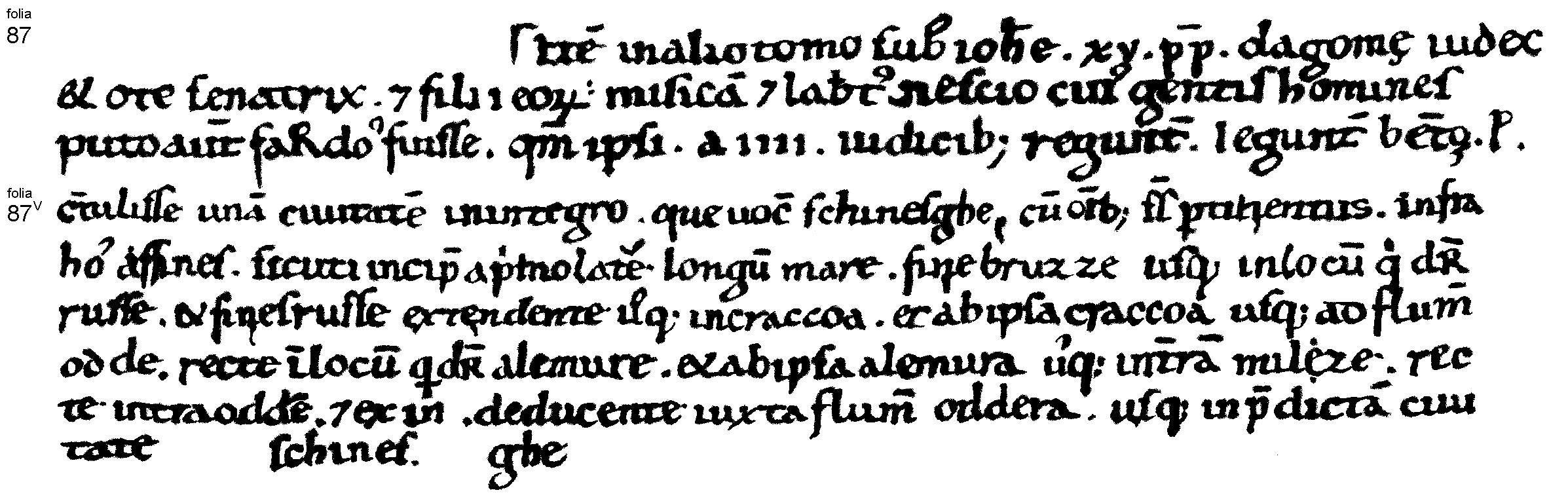

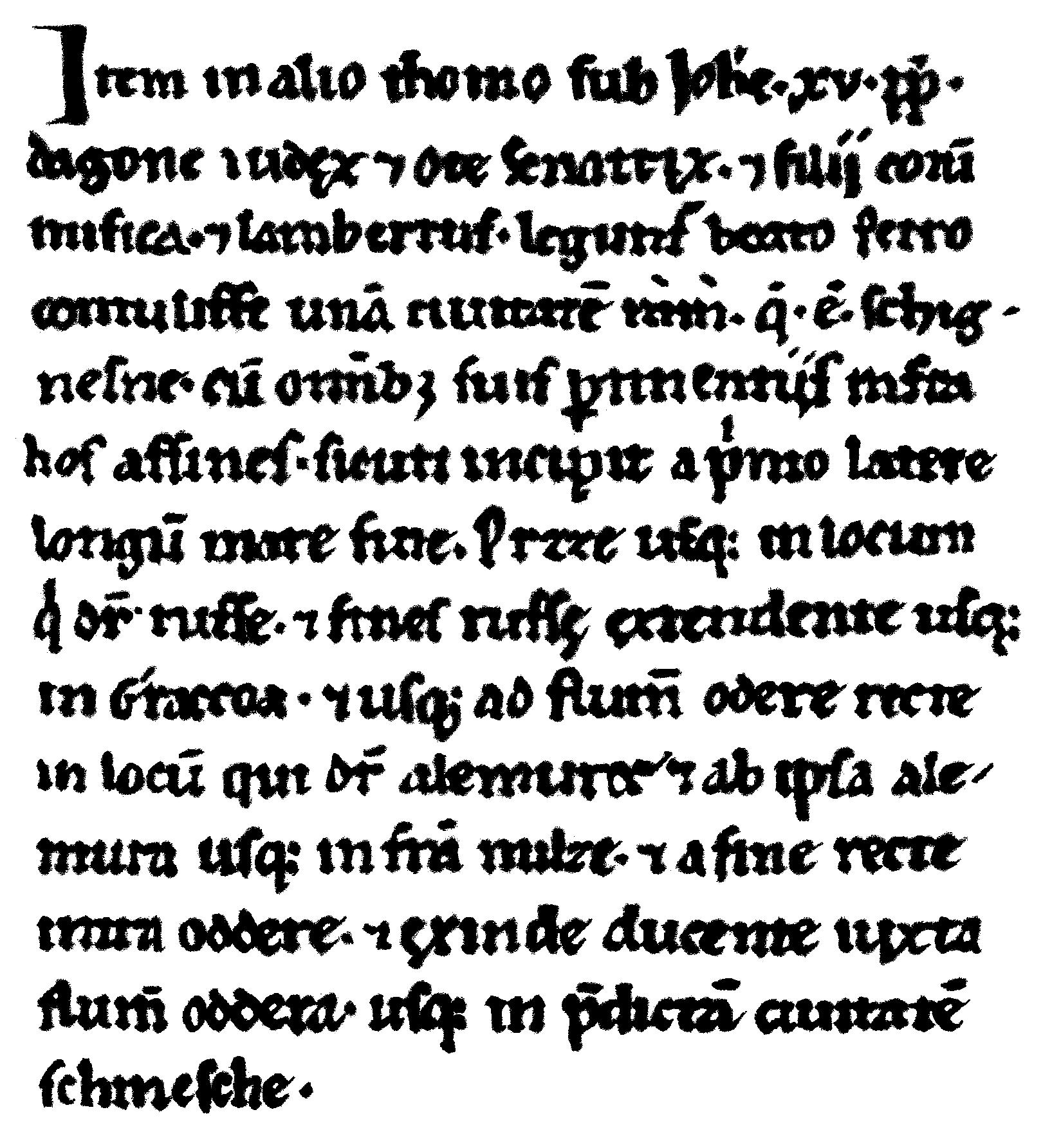

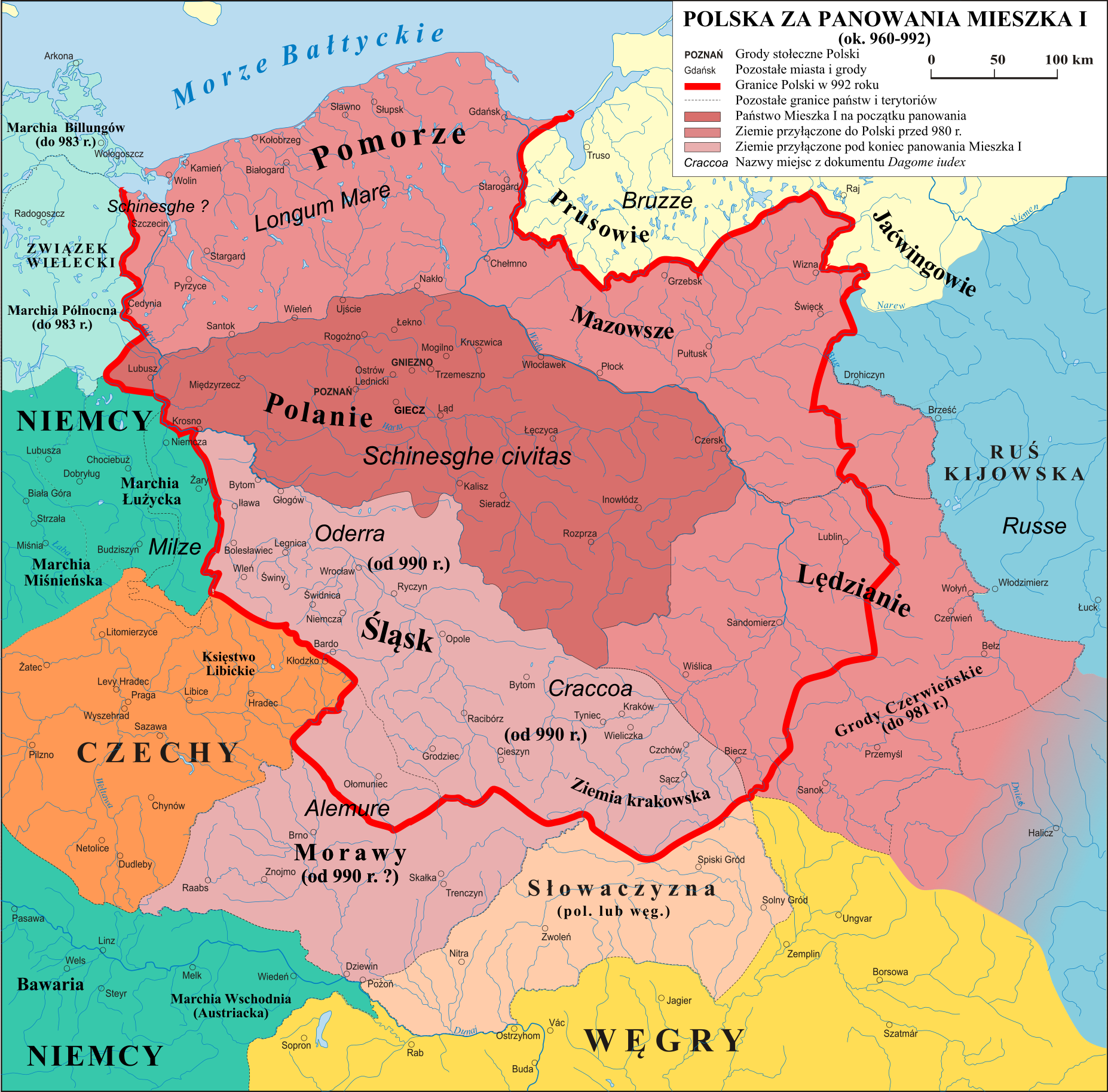
Poland under Mieszko's rule (ca. 960–992)

Dagome iudex is one of the earliest historical documents relating to Poland. Although Poland is not mentioned by name, it refers to Dagome and Ote (Mieszko I and his wife, Oda von Haldensleben) and their sons in 991, placing their land (called "Civitas Schinesghe") under the protection of the Apostolic See. The document's name derives from its opening words.

== History ==
The Dagome iudex survives in the form of a summary, completed c. 1080. It was found in a register compiled by a curial cardinal during the papacy of Gregory VII.

Most historians believe that the word "Dagome" is a melding of two names: the Christian "Dago", for "Dagobert" (Mieszko's hypothetical baptismal name), and the "Me," for pagan "Mieszko." The Latin word iudex ("judge") could refer to "prince." Another interpretation is that "Dagome iudex" is a corruption of "Ego Mesco dux" ("I, Prince Mieszko"). In the Vatican copy, the e of Dagome might have an s adscriptum (similar to cedilla), although the Vatican copyist read iudex literally, relating it to Sardinia and its four "judges".

Place names are misspelled by the writer who made the summary. He was apparently unaware that the document related to territory later called Poland.

The boundaries of the "Gniezno" state are described as those that extended to the "Long Sea" (the Baltic), Prussia, Rus', Kraków, Moravia and the Oder River. Lesser Poland is included by the mention of its capital, Kraków ("craccoa"). Between alemura, probably Olomouc and Upper Lusatia region of the Milceni (terra mileze)^{[a]} a straightened border could include Silesia.

The text seems to use civitas schinesghe as a synonym of Greater Poland. Otherwise, the boundary description would be more logical if schenisghe meant the city of Szczecin. Of the other regions and places in Mieszko's territory, it mentioned only Kraków and Lusatia, both without fines (border). The regions outside Mieszko's rule, pruzze (Prussia) and russe (Ruthenia) were mentioned with the word fines.

The Dagome iudex is of critical importance to Polish history, since it provided a general description of the future Polish state in that period. It, however, left many questions unanswered. First, it did not explain why Mieszko I placed his state under the Pope's protection. Also, it is unclear why the document did not mention Mieszko's eldest son, Bolesław I the Brave. Instead, his sons by his second wife (except the third), Oda, were mentioned instead. Finally, Mieszko I is not referred to as "Dagome" in any other document.

Historians suppose that Bolesław's absence from the document might be explained by an old custom whereby children received their inheritance as soon as they reached the age of majority. Thus, Bolesław the Brave might have received Kraków as his part of his father's legacy before the Dagome iudex was written.

== Text of the Dagome iudex ==
- In Latin:

Item in alio tomo sub Iohanne XV papa Dagome iudex et Ote senatrix et filii eorum: Misicam et Lambertus - nescio cuius gentis homines, puto autem Sardos fuisse, quoniam ipsi a IIII iudicibus reguntur - leguntur beato Petro contulisse unam civitatem in integro, que vocatur Schinesghe, cum omnibus suis pertinentiis infra hos affines, sicuti incipit a primo latere longum mare, fine Bruzze usque in locum, qui dicitur Russe et fines Russe extendente usque in Craccoa et ab ipsa Craccoa usque ad flumen Oddere recte in locum, qui dicitur Alemure, et ab ipsa Alemura usque in terram Milze recte intra Oddere et exinde ducente iuxta flumen Oddera usque in predictam civitatem Schinesghe.

- In English translation:

"Also in another volume from the times of Pope John XV, Dagome,^{[b]} lord,^{[c]} and Ote, lady,^{[d]} and their sons Misico and Lambert^{[e]} (I do not know of which nation those people are, but I think they are Sardinians, for those are ruled by four judges^{[f]}) were supposed to give to Saint Peter one state in whole which is called Schinesghe,^{[g]} with all its lands in borders which run along the long sea,^{[h]} along Prussia to the place called Rus, thence to Kraków and from said Kraków to the River Oder, straight to a place called Alemure,^{[i]} and from said Alemure to the land of Milczanie, and from the borders of that people to the Oder and from that, going along the River Oder, ending at the earlier mentioned city of Schinesghe."

== Notes ==
Notes based on interpretations by the Polish historian Gerard Labuda:

a. When Lusatia came in sight of medieval writers, the Lusici lived only in Lower Lusatia, the Milceni in Upper Lusatia. Later on, the term Lusatia (Lausitz, Lužice) was spread to the south. Therefore, nowaday's term Lusatian Mountains does not totally fit with the history of settlement.

b. "Dagome" is commonly identified as Mieszko I. However, the question remains open whether this was a misspelling or his Christian name. If the latter, it might correspond to the names "Dago", "Dagon" or "Dagobert".

c. In classical Latin, the term iudex was used to refer to "a person who is ordered to do some work on behalf of others" and was identical in meaning to the Byzantine archont. However, in medieval Latin iudex could also mean a sovereign ruler. Princes of Slavic tribes were sometimes referred to as iudices. Nevertheless, some historians claim that this was a misspelling of the Latin dux ("duke" or "prince").

d. Literally, "lady-senator". Cf. "senate".

e. It is unclear why Bolesław I the Brave, Mieszko's eldest son and his successor, is not mentioned while the children from Mieszko's marriage to Ote are.

f. Scribe's note, only in the Vatican copy; the four is written non-classical as iiii.

g. The origin of the name Schinesghe is unclear. Some historians argue that it is a corruption of "Gniezno", then Poland's capital. Others identify it with the town of Szczecin.

h. "Long sea": Some historians identify it with the Baltic Sea, others with the province of Pomerania (the Baltic coast), a part of Poland ca. 990.

i. Alemure might be the city of Olomouc, in Moravia. However, this is uncertain.
