= Oda of Haldensleben =

German noblewoman and consort to Mieszko I of Poland

- Duchess consort of Poland; Senatrix
- Tenure: 978/980 – 25 May 992
- Born: between 955–960
- Died: 1023
- Spouse: Mieszko I of Poland
- Issue: Świętopełk; Lambert; Mieszko; Gunhilda (most likely)
- Father: Dietrich of Haldensleben

Oda of Haldensleben (c. 955/60 – 1023) was Duchess of the Polans by marriage to Mieszko I of Poland.

== Life ==
Oda was the eldest child of Dietrich of Haldensleben, Margrave of the North March. She grew up in the monastery of Kalbe, near to Milde river in the north of Magdeburg. Eventually she became a nun there, and later was married to Duke Mieszko I of Poland. They had at least three, possibly four children:

1. Mieszko (born c. 979 – died after 992/95).
2. Świętopełk (born c. 980 – died before 991?).
3. Lambert (born c. 981 – died after 992/95).
4. Probably a daughter, who became Queen consort of Denmark (born 978/981 – died after 1017). She is often incorrectly referred to by modern historians as "Świętosława", while non-Polish primary sources call her "Gunhilda".

Some 80 years later a reference in an obscure church book mentions "Ote and Dago(me)". There is no actual document and the church book mentioning from c. 1080 is known as Dagome iudex and thus assumed to be one of the earliest Polish legal documents. It's a principal source for this portion of the history of Poland under the Piast dynasty.

The undated mentioning from 1080 states that "Dago(me)" (assumed to be Mieszko I) gifted his territory to Pope John XV and received his domains from him as a fief in this Dagome iudex, apparently issued shortly before his death, c. 991/92. This document indexes the lands of (Mieszko), referred to as "Dagome" in the document, and his wife "Ote" and her sons by him (Mieszko and Lambert are only named; probably Świętopełk was already dead by that time or was in Pomerania as a ruler, according to modern historians).

Oda returned to Germany and entered in the Abbey of Quedlinburg as a nun, where she died almost thirty years after her husband, in 1023. Nothing is known about the fate of her sons, but in 1032 her grandson Dietrich or Dytryk (son of either Mieszko or Lambert) returned to Poland and obtained parts of the country after the fall of Mieszko II Lambert; however, one year later he was expelled by Mieszko II, who could again reunite Poland in his hands.

== Sources ==
- Berend, Nora; Urbanczyk, Przemyslaw; Wiszewski, Przemyslaw (2013). Central Europe in the High Middle Ages: Bohemia, Hungary and Poland, c.900-c.1300. Cambridge University Press.
- Łukasiewicz, Krystyna (2009). ""Dagome Iudex" and the First Conflict over Succession in Poland". The Polish Review. 54 (4).
- Ketrzynski, S. (1950). "The Introduction of Christianity and the Early Kings of Poland". In Reddaway, W.F.; Penson, J.H.; Halecki, O.; Dyboski, R. (eds.). The Cambridge History of Poland. Cambridge University Press.

Oda of Haldensleben Born: c. 955/60 Died: 1023
Royal titles
Preceded by Dobrawa of Bohemia	Duchess consort of the Polans; 978–992	Succeeded by Emnilda
