= Mieszko I =

Duke of Poland (ruled c. 960–992)

Duke of Poland
- Reign: 960 – 25 May 992
- Predecessor: Siemomysł
- Successor: Bolesław I the Brave
- Born: c. 930
- Died: 25 May 992 (aged 61–62); Poznań, Duchy of Poland
- Spouse: Dobrawa of Bohemia; Oda of Haldensleben
- Issue more...: Bolesław I the Brave "Świętosława"; Vladivoj, Duke of Bohemia (?); Mieszko; Świętopełk; Lambert
- Dynasty: Piast
- Father: Siemomysł
- Religion: Slavic paganism (before 966); Chalcedonian Christianity (966–until his death)

Mieszko I (Polish pronunciation: [ˈmjɛʂkɔ ˈpjɛrfʂɨ]; c. 930 – 25 May 992) was Duke of Poland from 960 until his death in 992 and the founder of the first unified Polish state, the Civitas Schinesghe. A member of the Piast dynasty, he was the first Christian ruler of Poland and continued the policies of both his father and probably his grandfather, who initiated a process of unification among the Polish tribes and the creation of statehood.

According to existing sources, Mieszko I was a potent politician, a talented military leader and a charismatic ruler. Through both alliances and military force, he extended ongoing Polish conquests. Early in his reign, he subjugated Kuyavia and likely Gdańsk Pomerania and Masovia. For most of his reign, Mieszko I waged war for control of Western Pomerania. He eventually annexed it to the vicinity of the lower Oder River. His internal reforms were aimed at expanding and improving the so-called war monarchy system. During the last years of his life, he fought the Bohemian state and captured Silesia and lands now constituting Lesser Poland.

In foreign policy, Mieszko I placed the interests of his country foremost and entered into agreements with his former foes. He successfully used diplomacy by concluding alliances with Bohemia, Sweden and the Holy Roman Empire. Mieszko's alliance with the Czech prince Boleslaus the Cruel was strengthened by his marriage in 965 to the Přemyslid princess Dobrawa, who is said to have brought the Christian faith to Poland. Mieszko's baptism in 966 placed him and his country in the cultural sphere of Western Christianity; he is sometimes called the "Clovis of Poland" for his role in laying the foundations for a Christian Poland. On his death, he left to his son and successor, Bolesław I the Brave, a country with greatly expanded territories and a well-established position in Europe.

Mieszko I appeared as "Dagome" in a papal document dating to about 1085, called Dagome iudex, which mentions a gift or dedication of Mieszko's land to the Pope almost a hundred years earlier. The term possibly refers to Mieszko's adopted Christian name, Dagobert, which often features in historical writing. He also had a daughter who went to become a queen consort of Denmark and used to be identified with the figure of Scandinavian queen Sigrid the Haughty (Note: One source identifies her father as Skoglar Toste.). Through his daughter, Mieszko became the grandfather of Canute the Great and the great-grandfather of Gunhilda of Denmark, Canute the Great's daughter and wife of Henry III, Holy Roman Emperor.

== Early life ==
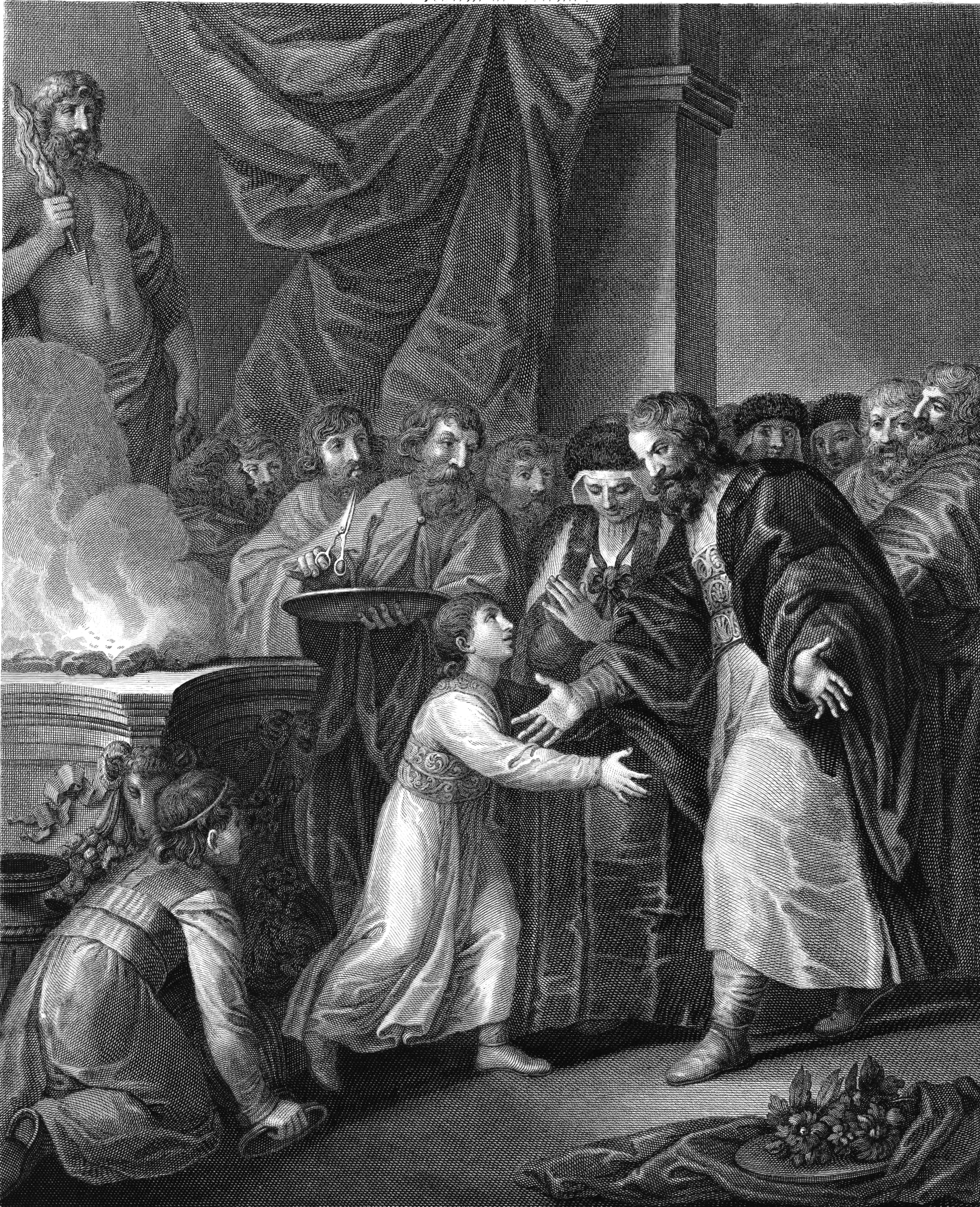
According to a legend, Mieszko was blind during the first seven years of life and gained his sight during postrzyżyny (first haircut), which was a pagan right of passage ritual.

There is no certain information on Mieszko's life before he took control of his lands. Only the Lesser Poland Chronicle gives the date of his birth as somewhere between the years 920–931 (depending on the version of the manuscript); however, modern researchers do not recognize the chronicle as a reliable source. Several historians, on the basis of their investigations, postulated the date of Mieszko's birth to have been between 922 and 945; The activity of the Duke in his final years of life puts the date of his birth closer to the latter year.

Mieszko's name has traditionally been thought to be a diminutive of Mieczysław, but this is refuted by the majority of modern historians. According to a legend first described by Gallus Anonymus, Mieszko was blind during his first seven years of life. This typical medieval allegory referred to his paganism rather than an actual disability. Another name of Mieszko, "Dagome", appears in the Dagome iudex document, though its origin is uncertain. Historians speculate that it was derived from Mieszko's adopted Christian name Dagobert or an abbreviation of the two names – "Dago" for Dagobert and "me" for Mieszko.

== Reign ==
=== Early reign ===
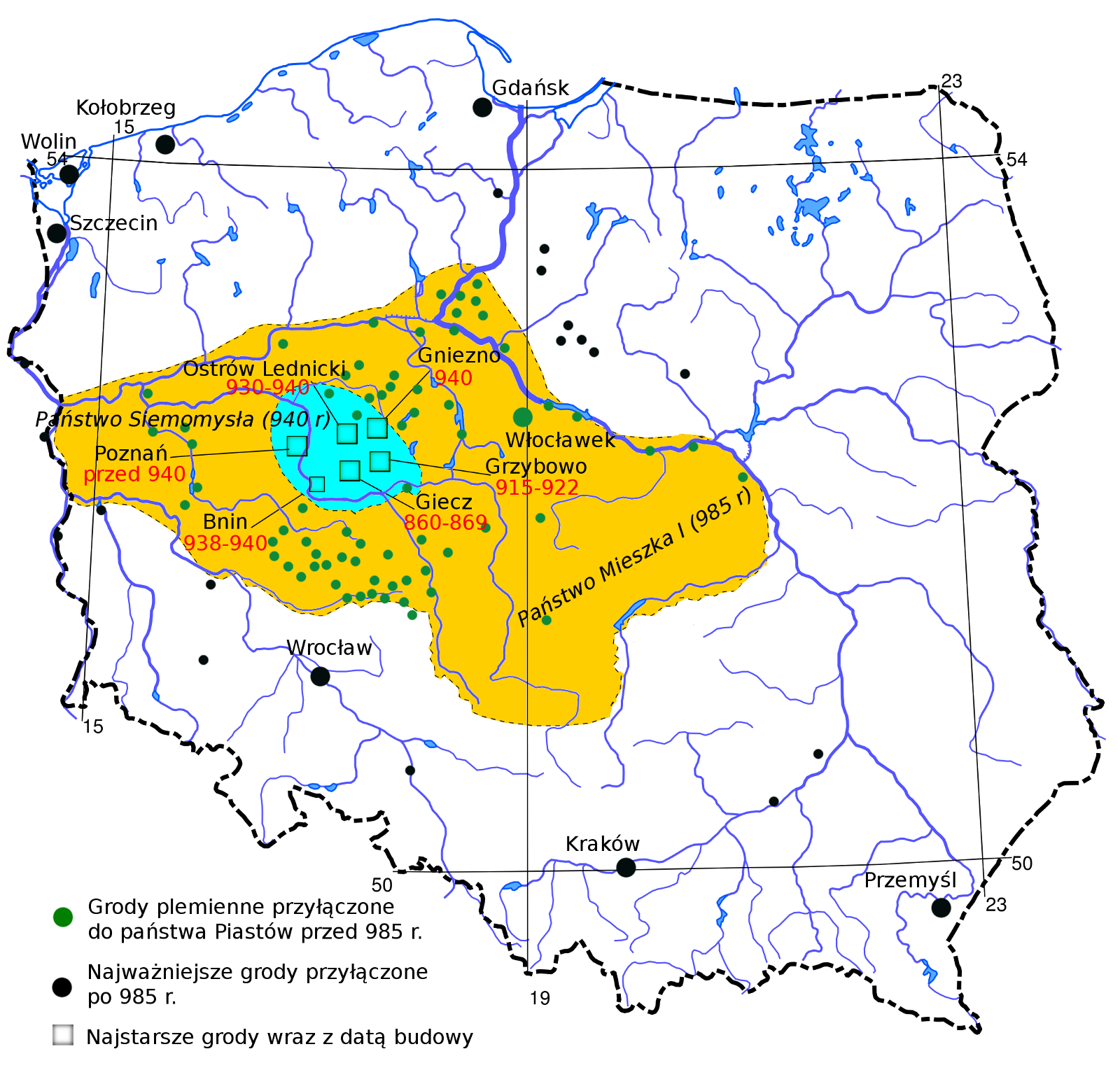
Polan strongholds under Mieszko's rule, mid-10th century

Mieszko I took over the rule after his father's death c. 950–960, probably closer to the latter date. Due to the lack of sources, it is not possible to determine exactly which lands he inherited. Certainly among them were the areas inhabited by the Polans and Goplans, as well as the Sieradz-Łęczyca lands and Kuyavia.. It is possible that this state also included Masovia and Gdańsk Pomerania. Soon the new ruler faced the task of integrating the relatively large, ethnically and culturally heterogeneous territory. Although the residents of areas controlled by Mieszko spoke mostly one language, had similar beliefs and reached a similar level of economic and general development, they were socially connected primarily by tribal structures. It appears that the elders cooperating with the Duke first felt the need for super-tribal unity, as expansion allowed them to broaden their influence.

Mieszko and his people were described around 966 by Abraham ben Jacob, a Sephardi Jewish traveller, who at that time visited the Prague court of Duke Boleslaus I the Cruel. Abraham presented Mieszko I as one of the four Slavic "kings", reigning over a vast "northern" area, with a highly regarded and substantial military force at his disposal. More precise contemporary records regarding Mieszko were compiled by Widukind of Corvey, and, half a century later, by Bishop Thietmar of Merseburg.

By the time Mieszko I took over from his father, the Polans' tribal federation of Greater Poland had for some time been actively expanding. Continuing this process, perhaps in the first years of Mieszko's reign, if it had not been done already by his father, Mieszko I conquered Masovia. Likely also during that period or earlier, at least part of Gdańsk Pomerania was obtained. Mieszko's interests were then concentrated mainly on areas occupied by the eastern (i.e., near the Oder River) branches of the Polabian Slavs.

In 963, Margrave Gero of Meissen conquered territories occupied by the Polabian Lusatian and Słupian tribes, and as a result came into direct contact with the Polish state. At the same time (about 960), Mieszko I began his expansion against the Velunzani and Lutici tribes. The war was recorded by the traveller Abraham ben Jacob. According to him, Mieszko I had fought against the Weltaba tribe, commonly identified with the Veleti. Wichmann the Younger, a Saxon nobleman who was then a leader of a band of Polabian Slavs, defeated Mieszko twice, and around 963, a brother of Mieszko, whose name is unknown, was killed in the fighting. The frontiers at the mouth of the Oder River were also desired by the German margraves. In addition, the Veleti Bohemia, which at that time possessed Silesia and Lesser Poland regions, constituted a danger for the young state of the Polans.

=== Margrave Gero's war; Mieszko's homage to the Emperor ===
The chronicle of Thietmar poses some problems of interpretation of the information regarding the attack of Margrave Gero on the Slavic tribes, as a result of which he purportedly "subordinated to the authority of the Emperor Lusatia and the Selpuli [viz., the Słupian tribes] and also Mieszko with his subjects". According to the majority of modern historians, Thietmar made an error summarizing the chronicle of Widukind, placing the Gero raid there instead of the fighting that Mieszko conducted at that time against Wichmann the Younger. Other sources make no mention of such a conquest and of putting the Polan state on the same footing with the Polabian Slavs. On the other hand, the supporters of the Gero's invasion theory believe that the Margrave did actually carry out a successful invasion, as a result of which Mieszko I was forced to pay tribute to the Emperor and also was compelled to adopt Catholicism through the German Church. The thesis that proposes the introduction of Catholicism as a result of this war finds no confirmation in German sources.

The homage is then a separate issue, since, according to the chronicle of Thietmar, Mieszko actually paid tribute to the Emperor from the lands usque in Vurta fluvium (up to the Warta River). In all probability, Mieszko decided to pay tribute in order to avoid an invasion similar to the one that Lusatia had suffered. This homage would take place in 965, or in 966 at the latest. Very likely the tribute applied only to the Lubusz land, which was in the German sphere of influence. This understanding of the tribute issue explains why already in 967 Mieszko I was described in the Saxon chronicles as the Emperor's friend (or ally, supporter, Latin: amicus imperatoris).

=== Marriage and conversion to Christianity ===
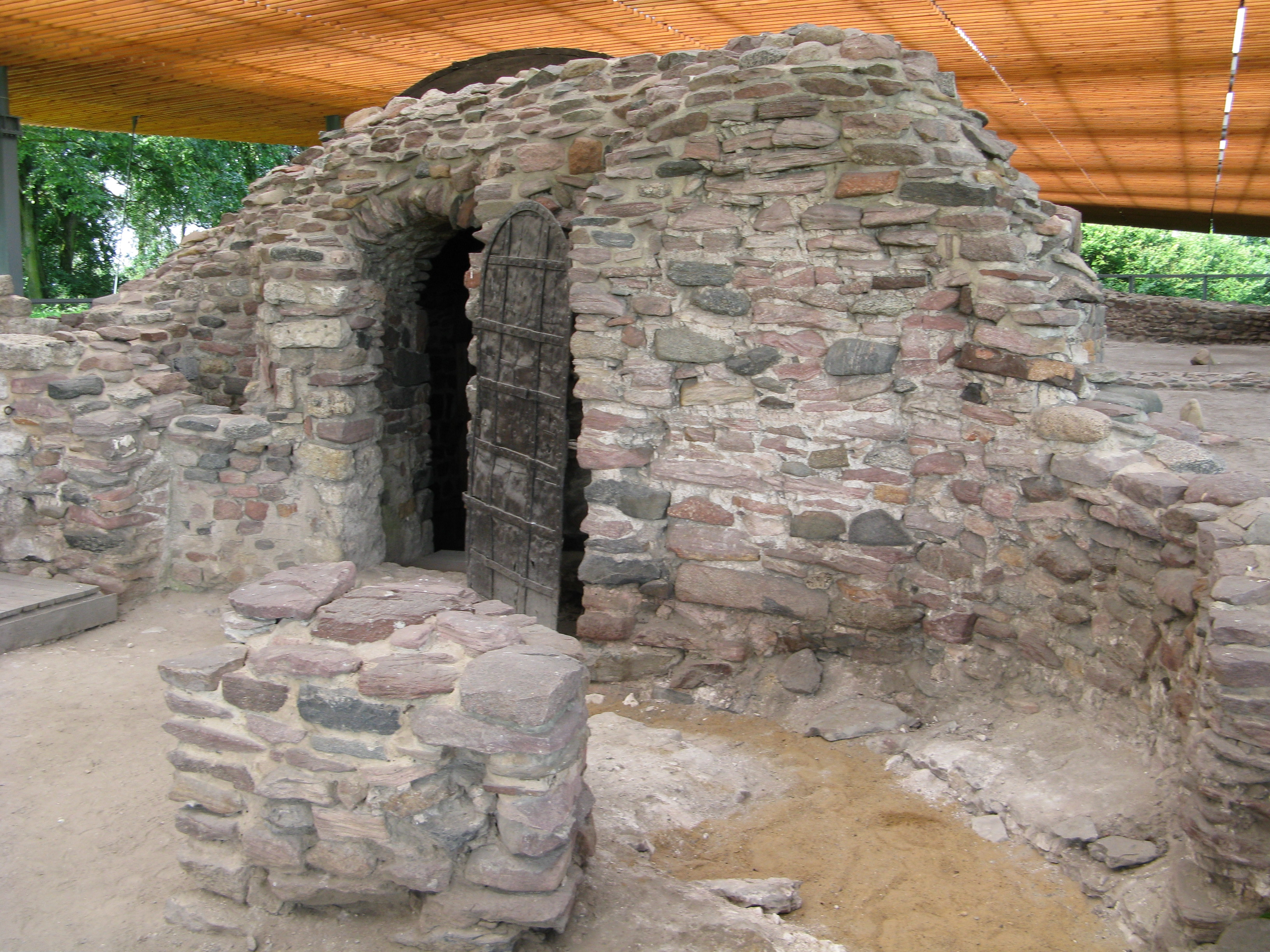
Ostrów Lednicki, ruins of palatium and chapel

Probably in 964, Mieszko began negotiations with Boleslaus I, Duke of Bohemia. As a result, in 965 Mieszko married his daughter Dobrawa (also named Dobrava, Doubravka or Dąbrówka). This political Polish-Bohemian alliance is likely to have been initiated by the Polish ruler. It is probable that the marriage was officially arranged in February 965.

The next step was the baptism of Mieszko. There are different hypotheses concerning this event. Most often, it is assumed that it was a political decision, intended to bring Mieszko's state closer to the Czechs and to facilitate his activities in the Polabian Slavs area. At the same time, the baptism decreased the likelihood of future attacks by German margraves and deprived them of the opportunity to attempt the Christianisation of Mieszko's lands by force. An additional reason could be Mieszko's desire to remove from power the influential pagan priest class, which may have been blocking his efforts to establish a more centralized rule.

A different hypothesis is linked with the above-mentioned acceptance of the veracity of Gero's invasion of Poland. According to it, it was the attack of the Margrave that forced the Catholicisation, which was to be an act of subordination to the Emperor, done without the mediation of the Pope.

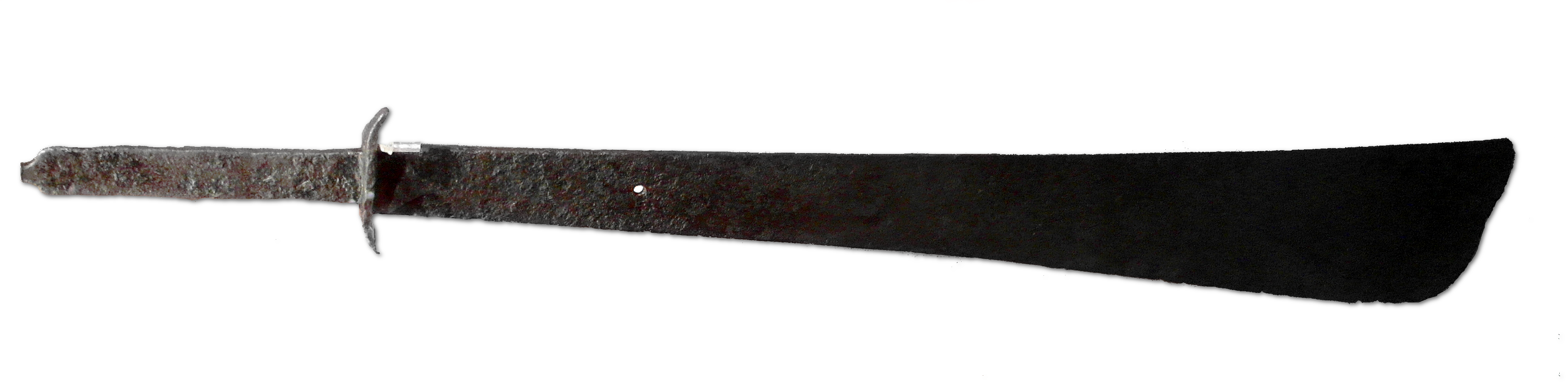
The Sword of Peter, a religious relic gifted by Pope John XIII to Mieszko or Jordan, the first Polish bishop. It arrived in Poland in around 968, following Mieszko's conversion.

Still other motives were responsible, according to Gallus Anonymus, who claimed that it was Dobrawa who convinced her husband to change his religion. Likewise, chronicler Thietmar attributes Mieszko's conversion to Dobrawa's influence. There are no reasons to negate Dobrawa's role in Mieszko's acceptance of Roman Catholicism; however, crediting rulers' wives with positive influence over their husbands' actions was a common convention at that time.

It is generally recognized that the baptism of Mieszko I took place in 966. The place is unknown; it could have happened in any of the cities of the Empire (possibly Regensburg), but also in one of the Polish towns like Gniezno or Ostrów Lednicki. The belief that the baptism was accomplished through the Czechs in order to avoid the dependence on Germany and the German Church is incorrect, because Bohemia would not have its own church organization until 973. At the time of the baptism of Mieszko, the existing Bohemian church establishment was a part of the Regensburg diocese. Thus, if the Polish ruler accepted the baptism through Prague's mediation, it had to be sanctioned in Regensburg. However, the religious vocabulary (words like baptism, sermon, prayer, church, apostle, bishop or confirmation) was adopted from the Czech language and had to come from Dobrawa's entourage and the church elements that arrived with her. Perhaps with her also came the first Polish bishop, Jordan. It could be that the reason for the Czech preference for Mieszko was the existence in Bohemia of a mission which followed the precepts of the Byzantine Greek brothers and later saints Cyril and Methodius, who developed and performed the liturgy in the Slavic rite, more readily understood by Mieszko and his subjects. The Slavic rite church branch had survived in Bohemia for another hundred years after Mieszko's baptism.

=== Conquest of Pomerania ===
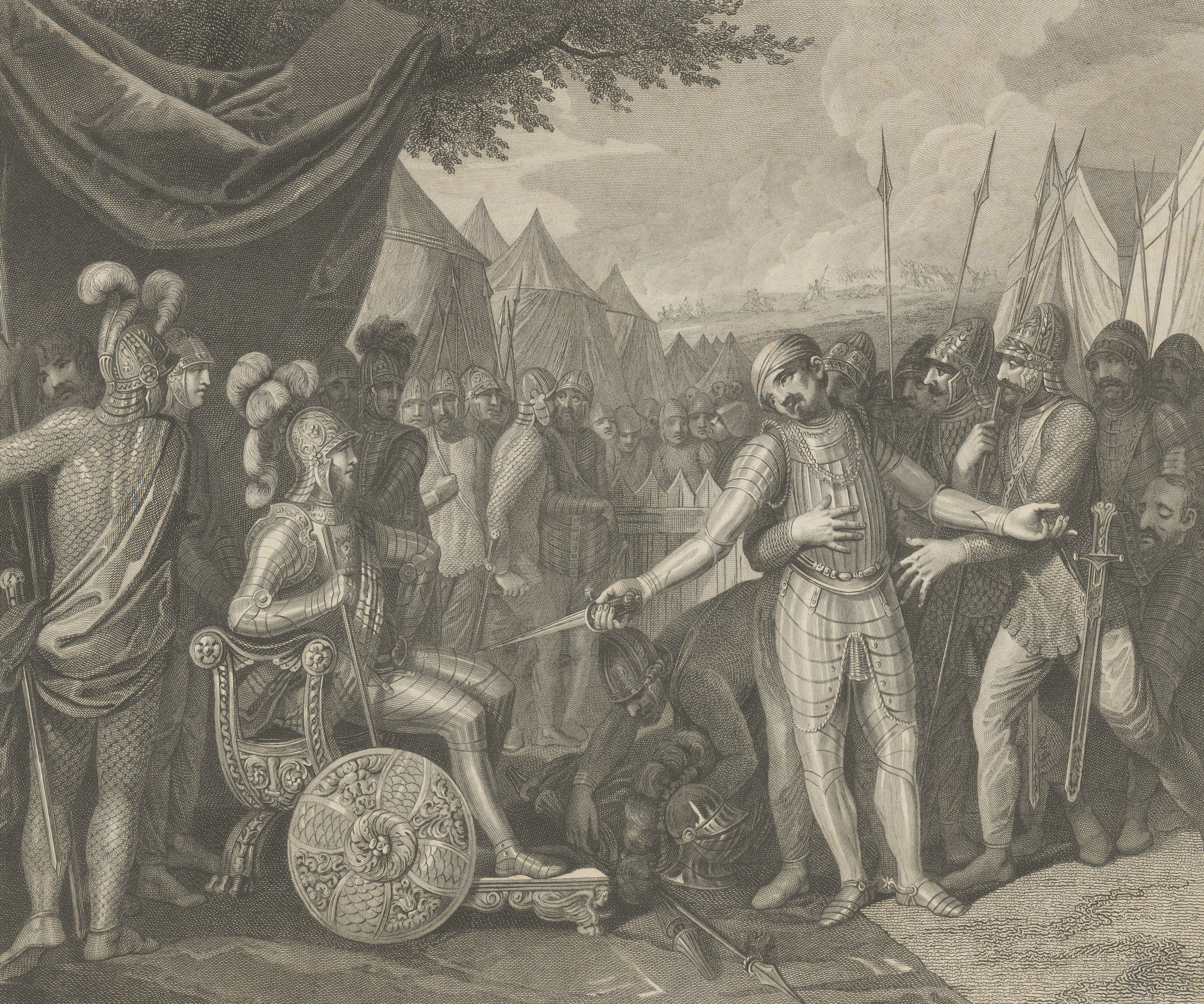
Wichmann the Younger Surrenders to the Polish Prince Mieszko by Franciszek Smuglewicz (early 19th century)

After the normalization of relations with the Holy Roman Empire and Bohemia, Mieszko I returned to his plans to conquer the western part of Pomerania. On 21 September 967, the Polish-Bohemian troops prevailed in the decisive battle against the Wolinians led by Wichmann the Younger, which gave Mieszko control over the mouth of the Odra River. The German margraves had not opposed Mieszko's activities in Pomerania, perhaps even supported them; the death of the rebellious Wichmann, who succumbed to his wounds soon after the battle, may have been in line with their interests. A telling incident took place after the battle, a testimony to Mieszko's high standing among the Empire's dignitaries, just one year after his baptism: Widukind of Corvey reported that the dying Wichmann asked Mieszko to hand over Wichmann's weapons to Emperor Otto I, to whom Wichmann was related. For Mieszko, the victory had to be a satisfying experience, especially in light of his past defeats inflicted by Wichmann.

The exact result of Mieszko's fighting in the west of Pomerania is not known. Subsequent loss of the region by Mieszko's son Bolesław suggests that the conquest was difficult and the hold over that territory rather tenuous. In one version of the legend of Saint Adalbert of Prague (known in Polish as Wojciech), it is written that Mieszko I had his daughter married to a Pomeranian prince, who previously voluntarily "was washed with the holy water of the baptism" in Poland. The above information, as well as the fact that Bolesław lost Western Pomerania, suggests that the region was not truly incorporated into the Polish state, but only became a fief. This conjecture seems to be confirmed in the introduction of the first volume of the chronicles of Gallus Anonymus concerning the Pomeranians: "Although often the leaders of the forces defeated by the Polish duke sought salvation in baptism, as soon as they regained their strength, they repudiated the Christian faith and started the war against Christian anew".

=== War against Margrave Odo I of Ostmark ===
In 972, Poland was attacked by Odo I, Margrave of the Saxon Ostmark. According to the chronicles of Thietmar, Odo acted unilaterally, without the Emperor's consent: "Meanwhile, the noble Margrave Hodo, having collected his army attacked Mieszko, who has been faithfully paying tribute to the Emperor (for the lands) up the Warta river."

There are different hypotheses concerning the reasons for this invasion. Possibly, Margrave Odo wanted to stop the growing power of the Polish state. Very likely, Odo wanted to protect the Wolinian state, which he considered his zone of influence, from the Polish take-over. Possibly the Wolinians themselves called the Margrave and asked his help. In any event, Odo's forces moved in and on 24 June 972 twice engaged Mieszko's army at the village of Cidini, commonly identified with Cedynia. At first, the Margrave defeated Mieszko's forces; subsequently, the Duke's brother Czcibor defeated the Germans in the decisive stage, inflicting great losses among their troops. It may be that Mieszko intentionally staged the retreat, which was followed by a surprise attack on the flank of the German pursuing troops. After this battle, Mieszko and Odo were called to the Imperial Diet in Quedlinburg in 973 to explain and justify their conduct. The exact judgment of the Emperor is unknown, but it is certain that the sentence was not carried out because he died a few weeks after the Diet. It is commonly assumed that the sentence was unfavorable to the Polish ruler. The Annals of Altaich indicates that Mieszko was not present in Quedlinburg during the gathering; instead, he had to send his son Bolesław as a hostage.

Mieszko's conflict with Odo I was a surprising event because, according to Thietmar, Mieszko respected the Margrave highly. Thietmar wrote that "Mieszko would never wear his outdoor garment in a house where Odo was present, or remain seated after Odo had gotten up."

It is believed that in practical terms the victory at Cedynia sealed Western Pomerania's fate as Mieszko's dependency.

=== Acquisitions in the east ===
Poland under Mieszko's rule, c. 960–992

According to archaeological research, during the 970s, the Sandomierz region and the Przemyśl area inhabited by the Lendians became incorporated into the Polish state. None of it is certain due to the lack of written sources. It is possible that especially the Przemyśl area, also inhabited the White Croats, belonged at that time to Bohemia, which supposedly extended up to the Bug River and Styr River. The Primary Chronicle states that in 981 Vladimir of the Rurik Dynasty "went towards the Lachy and took their towns: Przemyśl, Czerwień and other strongholds [...]". The exact interpretation of this passage is uncertain, because the Ruthenian word "Lachy" meant both the Poles in general and the southeastern Lendians. Mieszko's conquest of Sandomierz could also have taken place later, together with the takeover of the Vistulans (western and central Lesser Poland). However, Widukind in the 10th century mentions Mieszko ruled over the Sclavi tribe of Licicaviki, which is identified with the Lendians.

Some historians suggest that the regions of Sandomierz, Lublin and Czerwień (western Red Ruthenia) were indeed annexed by Mieszko's state in the 970s, as lands valuable for trade reasons and as a starting point for a future attack against what was to become Lesser Poland, then in the hands of Bohemia. Sandomierz, under this scenario, was the central hub of the area, with Czerwień, Przemyśl and Chełm assuming the function of defensive borderland strongholds.

=== Involvement in German internal disputes; Second marriage ===
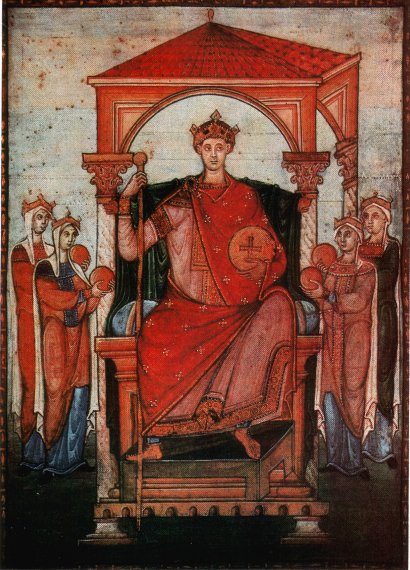
Emperor Otto II, from Registrum Gregorii, c. 983

After the death of Emperor Otto I in 973, Mieszko, like his brother-in-law, Duke Boleslaus II of Bohemia, joined the German opposition in support of the attempted imperial succession of Henry II, Duke of Bavaria. Mieszko may have been motivated by revenge because of the (presumably) negative verdict of the Quedlinburg summit, but, more importantly, he may have wanted more favorable terms for his cooperation with Germany. The participation of Mieszko in the conspiracy against Otto II was documented in only one source, the chronicles of the monastery in Altaich in its entry for the year 974. The Duke of Bavaria was defeated, and Emperor Otto II regained full power. Shortly afterwards, the young emperor waged a retaliatory expedition against Bohemia in 978, forcing Duke Boleslaus into submission.

In 977, Mieszko's wife, Dobrawa, died. At first, there were no apparent repercussions, as the Polish ruler had maintained his alliance with Bohemia.

In 979, Otto II supposedly attacked Poland. Mention of this event can be found in the Chronicle of the Bishops of Cambrai from the 11th century. The effects of this expedition are unknown, but it is suspected that the Emperor did not succeed. Due to bad weather, the Emperor was back at the border of Thuringia and Saxony in December of that year. It is uncertain whether the invasion actually took place. The chronicle only stated that it was an expedition "against the Slavs". Archaeological discoveries appear to support the thesis of Otto's invasion. In the last quarter of the 10th century, there had been a radical expansion of the fortifications at Gniezno and Ostrów Lednicki, which may be associated with the Polish-German war, or the expectation of such. The duration of the expedition suggests that it may have reached as far east as the vicinity of Poznań.

The Polish-German agreement was concluded in the spring or possibly summer of 980, because in November of that year Otto II left his country and went to Italy. It appears that during this time Mieszko I married Oda, daughter of Dietrich of Haldensleben, Margrave of the Northern March, after abducting her from the monastery of Kalbe. Chronicler Thietmar described the event as follows:

When Bolesław's mother died, his father married, without permission from the Church, a nun from the monastery in Kalbe, daughter of Margrave Dietrich. Oda was her name and her guilt was great. For she scorned her vows to God, and gave preference to the man of war before him [...] But because of the concern for the well-being of the homeland and the necessity to secure its peace, the event caused no break in relations; instead, a proper way was found to restore concord. For thanks to Oda, the legion of followers of Christ became augmented, many prisoners returned to their country, the shackled had their chains taken off, and the gates of prisons were opened for the trespassers.

Although Thietmar made no mention of warfare that possibly took place on this occasion, the information on the return of the accord, acting for the good of the country and release of prisoners indicates that a conflict actually did occur.

The marriage with Oda considerably affected the position and prestige of Mieszko, who entered the world of Saxon aristocracy. As a son-in-law of Margrave Dietrich, he gained an ally in one of the most influential politicians of the Holy Roman Empire. As the Margrave was a distant relative of the Emperor, Mieszko became a member of the circle connected to the imperial ruling house.

=== Cooperation with Sweden and the war against Denmark ===
Probably in the early 980s, Mieszko allied his country with Sweden against Denmark. The alliance was thought to be sealed with the marriage of Mieszko's daughter Świętosława with the Swedish king Erik, though it appears it likely was not the case. The content of the treaty is known from the traditional account—not entirely reliable, but originating directly from the Danish court—given by Adam of Bremen. In this text, probably as a result of confusion, he gives instead of Mieszko's name the name of his son Bolesław:

The King of the Swedes, Erik, entered into an alliance with the very powerful King of the Polans, Bolesław. Bolesław gave Erik his daughter or sister. Because of this cooperation, the Danes were routed by the Slavs and the Swedes.

Mieszko decided on the alliance with Sweden probably in order to help protect his possessions in Pomerania from the Danish King Harald Bluetooth and his son Sweyn. They may have acted in cooperation with the Wolinian autonomous entity. The Danes were defeated c. 991 and their ruler was expelled. The dynastic alliance with Sweden had probably affected the equipment and composition of Mieszko's troops.

=== Participation in the German civil war ===
In 982, Emperor Otto II suffered a disastrous defeat against the Emirate of Sicily. The resulting weakness of the imperial power was exploited by the Lutici, who initiated a great uprising of the Polabian Slavs in 983. German authority in the area ceased to exist and the Polabian tribes began to threaten the Empire. The death of Otto II at the end of that year contributed further to the unrest. Ultimately, the Lutici and the Obotrites were able to liberate themselves from German rule for the next two centuries.

The Emperor left a minor successor, Otto III. His regency was claimed by Henry II of Bavaria. Like in 973, Mieszko and the Czech duke Boleslaus II took the side of the Bavarian duke. This fact is confirmed in the chronicle of Thietmar, which noted that "There arrived [at the Diet of Quedlinburg] also, among many other princes: Mieszko, Mściwoj and Boleslaus and promised to support him under oath as the king and ruler".

In 984, the Czechs took over Meissen, but in the same year, Henry II gave up his pretension to the German throne.

The role played by Mieszko I in the subsequent struggles is unclear because the contemporary sources are scarce and not in agreement. Probably in 985, the Polish ruler ended his support for the Bavarian duke and moved to the side of the Emperor. It is believed that Mieszko's motivation was the threat posed to his interests by the uprising of the Polabian Slavs. The upheaval was a problem for both Poland and Germany, but not for Bohemia. In the Chronicle of Hildesheim, in the entry for the year 985, it is noted that Mieszko came to help the Saxons in their fight against some Slavic forces, presumably the Polabians.

One year later, the Polish ruler had a personal meeting with the Emperor, an event mentioned in the Annals of Hersfeld, which reported that "Otto the boy-king ravaged Bohemia, but received Mieszko who arrived with gifts".

According to Thietmar and other contemporary chronicles, the gift given by Mieszko to the Emperor was a camel. The meeting cemented the Polish-German alliance, with Mieszko joining Otto's expedition against a Slavic land, which "together they wholly devastated [...] with fire and tremendous depopulation". It is not clear which Slavic territory was invaded. Perhaps another raid against the Polabians took place. However, there are indications that it was an expedition against the Czechs, Mieszko's first against his southern neighbors. Possibly on this occasion, the Duke of the Polans accomplished the most significant expansion of his state, the takeover of Lesser Poland.

Thietmar's narrative, however, raises doubts as to whether the joined military operation actually happened. The chronicler claims that a settlement was then concluded between the Emperor and the Bohemian ruler Boleslaus II the Pious, which is not mentioned in any other source and is contrary to the realities of the political situation at that time.

Another debatable point is Thietmar's claim that Mieszko "subordinated himself to the King". Most historians believe that it was only a matter of recognition of Otto's royal authority. Some suggest that a fealty relationship could have been involved.

=== War against Bohemia; incorporation of Silesia and Lesser Poland ===
Whether or not the German-Polish invasion of Bohemia actually happened, the friendly relations between the Czechs and the Poles came to an end. Bohemia resumed its earlier alliance with the Lutici, which, in 990, resulted in a war with Mieszko, who was supported by Empress Theophanu. Duke Boleslaus II was probably the first one to attack. As a result of the conflict Silesia was taken over by Poland. However, the annexation of Silesia possibly took place around 985, because during this year the major Piast strongholds in Wrocław, Opole and Głogów were already being built.

The issue of the incorporation of Lesser Poland is also not completely resolved. Possibly, Mieszko took the region before 990, which is indicated by the vague remark of Thietmar, who wrote of a country taken by Mieszko from Boleslaus. In light of this theory, the conquest of Lesser Poland could be a reason for the war, or its first stage. Many historians suggested that the Czech rule over Lesser Poland was only nominal and likely limited to the indirect control of Kraków and perhaps a few other important centers. This theory is based on the lack of archaeological discoveries, which would indicate major building investments undertaken by the Bohemian state.

After its incorporation, Lesser Poland supposedly became part of the country assigned to Mieszko's oldest son, Bolesław, which is indirectly indicated in the chronicle of Thietmar.

Some historians, on the basis of the chronicle of Cosmas of Prague, believe that the conquest of the lands around the lower Vistula River took place after Mieszko's death, specifically in 999. There is also a theory according to which, during this transition period, Lesser Poland was governed by Bolesław, whose authority was granted to him by the Bohemian duke.

=== Dagome iudex ===
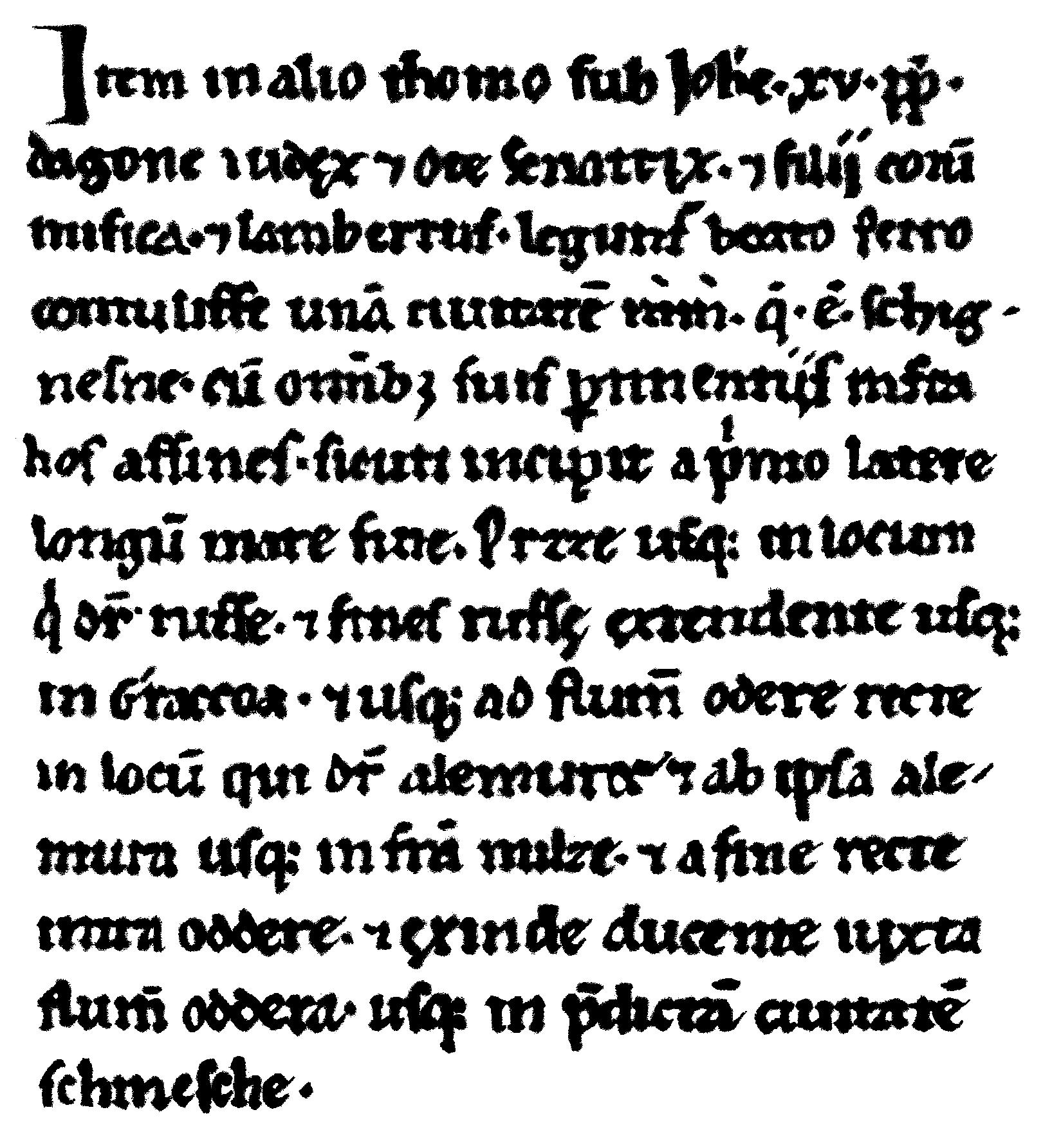
Dagome iudex

At the end of his life (c. 991–992), Mieszko I, together with his wife Oda and their sons, issued a document called Dagome iudex, where the Polish ruler placed his lands under the protection of the pope and described their borders. Only a later, imprecise summary of the document has been preserved.

There are two main theories concerning the reasons behind the issuing of Dagome iudex:

- According to the first theory, the document was an effort to transform the existing missionary bishopric into a regular organization of the Catholic Church that would cover all of Mieszko's state. This understanding implies that the arrangement led to payment by Poland of Peter's Pence.
- The second theory assumes that the document was created in order to protect the interests of Mieszko's second wife, Oda and their sons (who were named in the document) after Mieszko's death. Bolesław, Mieszko's eldest son, whose mother was Dobrawa, was not named in the document. However, one of Mieszko's and Oda's sons, Świętopełk, was also not mentioned.

Dagome iudex is of capital importance for Polish history because it gives a general description of the Polish state's geographical location at the end of Mieszko's reign.

=== Late reign, death and succession ===
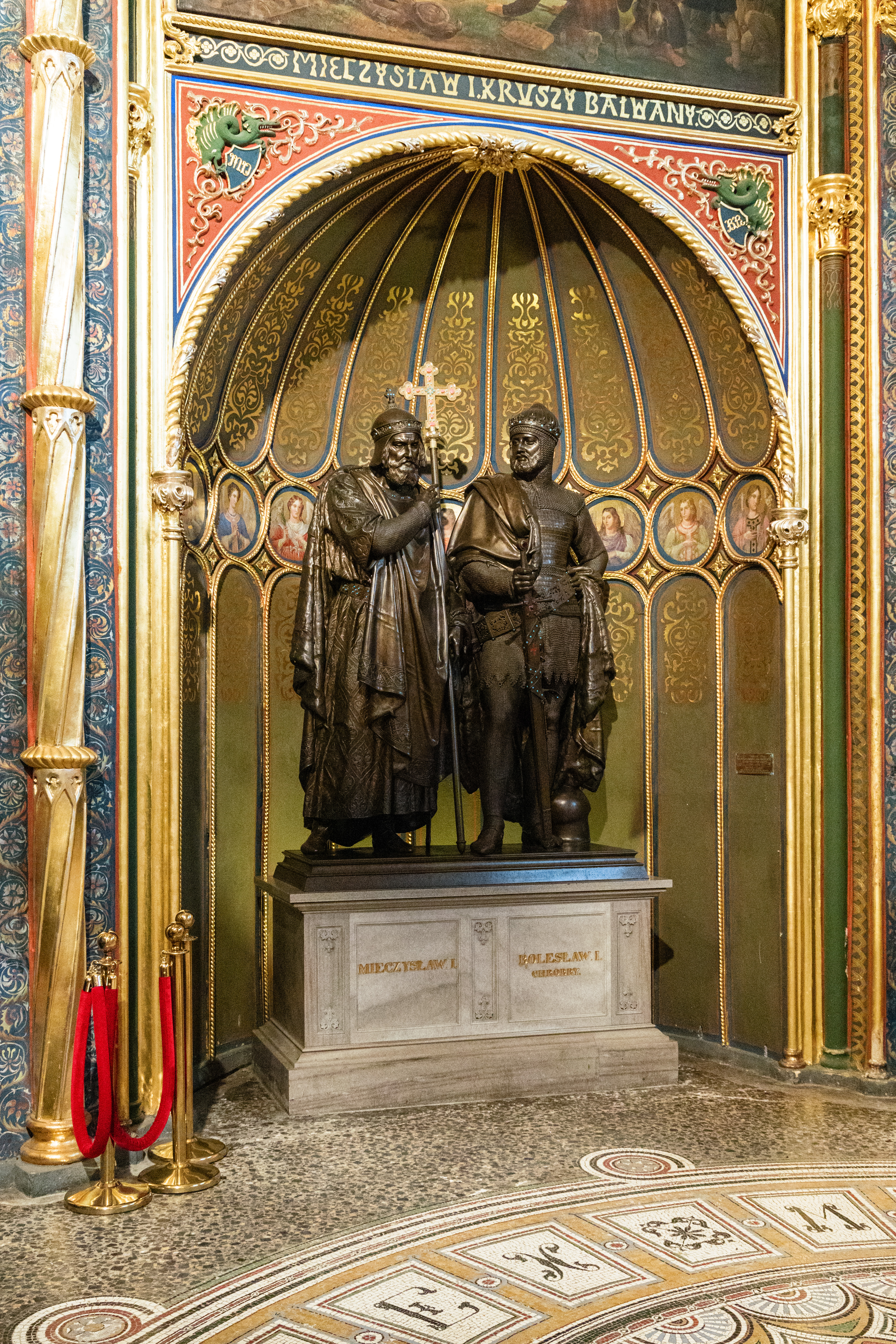
Monumental tomb of Mieszko I and Bolesław I by Christian Daniel Rauch

During his last years of life, Mieszko remained loyal to the alliance with the Holy Roman Empire. In 991, he arrived at a gathering in Quedlinburg, where he participated in the customary exchange of gifts with Otto III and Empress Theophanu. In the same year, he took part in a joint expedition with the young king to Brandenburg.

Mieszko died on 25 May 992. Sources give no reasons to believe that his death occurred from causes other than natural. According to Thietmar, the Polish ruler died "in old age, overcome with fever". Probably, he was buried in the Poznań Cathedral. The remains of the first historical ruler of Poland have never been found and the place of his burial is not known with certainty. In 1836–1837, a cenotaph was built for Mieszko I and his successor Bolesław I the Brave in the Golden Chapel (Polish: Złota Kaplica) at the Poznań Cathedral, where the damaged remains found in the 14th-century tomb of Bolesław were placed.

According to Thietmar Mieszko I divided his state before his death among a number of princes. They were probably his sons: Bolesław I the Brave, Mieszko and Lambert.

In 1999, the archeologist Hanna Kóčka-Krenz located what's left of Mieszko's palace-chapel complex in Poznań.

== Legacy ==
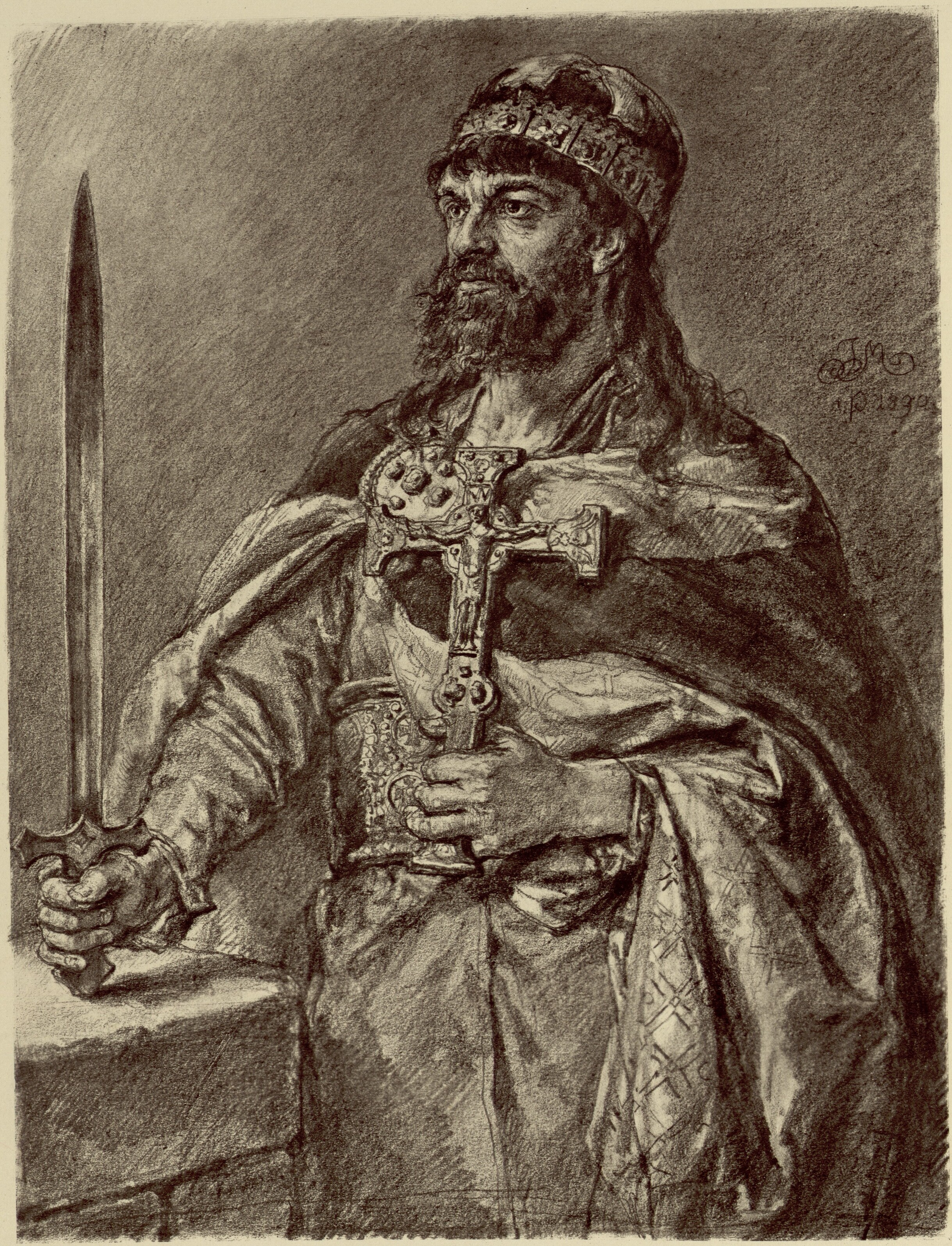
Mieszko as imagined by Jan Matejko in the 19th century

Mieszko is chiefly credited with the unification of Polish lands. His state was the first state that could be called Poland. He is often considered the founder, the principal creator and builder of the Polish state. His acceptance of Roman Catholicism led to the inclusion of Poland in the mainstream civilization and political structures of Roman Catholic Europe. He sponsored the erection of churches. The Gniezno Cathedral was constructed during Mieszko's rule. It is very likely the Duke also founded the church at Ostrów Tumski and the Poznań Cathedral. Possibly during Mieszko's reign, Poland began minting its own coin, the denarius, though according to S. Suchodolski, the monetary system was installed by Mieszko's grandson and namesake, Mieszko II Lambert.

At the end of his rule, Mieszko I left to his sons a territory at least twice as large as what he inherited from his father. The most significant were the additions of Silesia, Western Pomerania, and probably Lesser Poland, including Kraków. It is roughly to his borders that Poland was returned in 1945. He was the first ruler to conduct efficient foreign policy, which included agreements with Germany, Bohemia and Sweden, and prudently used his military resources.

Mieszko is featured on the obverse of the 10 Polish złoty banknote.

== Marriages and issue ==
According to Gallus Anonymus, before becoming a Christian, Mieszko had seven pagan wives, whom he was required to relinquish, leaving Dobrawa as his only spouse. Nothing is known of the fates of any possible children from these relationships. In 965, before his baptism, Mieszko married Dobrawa of Bohemia (b. 940/945 – d. 977). They had one known child:

1. Bolesław I the Brave (Chrobry) (b. 967 – d. 17 June 1025)

According to one hypothesis, there was another daughter of Mieszko, married to a Pomeranian Slavic prince; she could be a daughter of Dobrawa or of one of the previous pagan wives. According to one theory, this unnamed daughter of Mieszko I and her Pomeranian husband were the parents of Zemuzil, Duke of Pomerania. Also, a theory exists (apparently based on Thietmar and supported by Oswald Balzer in 1895) that Vladivoj, who ruled as Duke of Bohemia in 1002–1003, was a son of Mieszko and Dobrawa. Although most modern historians reject this claim, Bohemian historiography supported the Piast parentage of Vladivoj.

In 978/979, Mieszko married Oda of Haldensleben (b. 955/960 – d. 1023), daughter of Dietrich of Haldensleben, Margrave of the Northern March. She was taken by her future husband from the monastery of Kalbe. They had three sons:

1. Mieszko (b. c. 979 – d. aft. 992/995)
2. Świętopełk (b. ca. 980 – d. bef. 991?)
3. Lambert (b. c. 981 – d. aft. 992/995).

After a struggle for power between Bolesław I and Oda with her minor sons (Bolesław's half-brothers), the eldest son of Mieszko I took control over all of his father's state and expelled his stepmother and her sons from Poland.

By an unknown woman, Mieszko had:

1. Daughter of uncertain name (referred to as Gunhild in Scandinavian sources) (b. ca. 978/981 – d. after 1017), queen consort of Denmark.

She was for long time identified as Sigrid the Haughty (b. 968/972 – d. c. 1016), wife of Eric the Victorious, King of Sweden, and then of Sweyn Forkbeard, King of Denmark, and the mother of Cnut the Great, King of Denmark, Norway and England. She was thought to be a child of Doubravka. This daughter's Polish name was incorrectly determined to be "Świętosława" and she has continued to be called that in historical discourse, despite no contemporary evidence suggesting this. Comprehensive comparison of Scandinavian, Polish and German sources suggests that Mieszko's daughter instead of being wife of two aforementioned kings, was married only to Sweyn, by whom she became mother of Cnut the Great, Harald II and Świętosława, and grandmother of Gunhild, the wife of Henry III, Holy Roman Emperor. She is known in Scandinavian sources as Gunhild of Wenden, and both this name and timeline suggest she was most likely the daughter of Oda, instead of Doubravka as was previously believed.

== Bibliography ==
- Jasiński K., Rodowód pierwszych Piastów, Warszawa-Wrocław (1992), pp. 54–70.
- Labuda G., Mieszko I, (in) Polski Słownik Biograficzny, vol. 21, 1976.
- Labuda G., Mieszko I, Wyd. Ossolineum, Wrocław 2002, ISBN 83-04-04619-9.
- Labuda G., Pierwsze państwo polskie, Krajowa Agencja Wydawnicza, Kraków 1989, ISBN 83-03-02969-X.
- Philip Earl Steele Nawrócenie i Chrzest Mieszka I 2005, ISBN 83-922344-8-0; 2nd edition 2016, ISBN 978-83-7730-966-7.
- Philip Earl Steele, Homo religiosus: the phenomenon of Poland's Mieszko I, [in] The dawning of Christianity in Poland and across Central and Eastern Europe, Peter Lang, 2020, ISBN 978-3-631-78725-0.
- Szczur S., Historia Polski średniowiecze, chap. 2.2.1 Państwo gnieźnieńskie Mieszka I (pp. 47–57) i 2.4.1 Drużyna książęca (pp. 83–84), Wydawnictwo Literackie 2002, ISBN 83-08-03272-9.

== See also ==
- Prehistory and protohistory of Poland
- Poland in the Early Middle Ages
- History of Poland (966–1385)
- List of Poles

Mieszko I Piast Dynasty Born: 920/945 Died: 25 May 992
Preceded by Siemomysł	Duke of the Polans; 960 – 25 May 992	Succeeded by Bolesław I the Brave
