= Père Dagobert =

Capuchin monk

Father Dagobert de Longuory (a.k.a. Père Dagobert) was a Capuchin friar who arrived in New Orleans from Quebec in 1722. In 1745, he became priest of the Parish Church of St. Louis (dedicated as a Cathedral in 1794) and later was appointed as vicar general of the diocese. He was active regionally for over 50 years and died in 1776.

While largely overlooked today, his contributions to New Orleans and its people are significant and enduring. One finds numerous references to him in historical accounts of 18th-century New Orleans, and despite sometimes conflicting information, it is agreed by the majority of historians that he was a seminal figure in the spiritual and social life of the city.

Following are some themes that reoccur throughout historical documents.

He was:

- Regarded as a great champion of the poor, and beloved by the people of New Orleans
- Praised for his kindness and love of the people of New Orleans, and their customs.
- A little "rotund" and described as "jolly."
- A great lover of food and wine, and was even described as a "gastronome."
- Criticized by the Spanish clergy for being too lax with regard to Catholic ritual.
- Non-traditional in that he wore a tricorn hat and other non-sanctioned garb.
- Noted for celebrating births and marriages at homes of his parishioners, and even frequented taverns.
- In charge of Charity Hospital for 8 years in the 1750s
- Quite famous regionally and even somewhat nationally well into the 20th century.

The consensus in historical texts is that his substantial political and social influence came, in large part, from his popularity.
