= Stanisław Szczur =

Polish medievalist (1955–2010)

- Born: 24 February 1955; Krosno
- Died: 11 November 2010 (aged 55); Rabka-Zdrój
- Citizenship: Polish
- Education: Jagiellonian University
- Occupations: medievalist, academic teacher
- Employer: Jagiellonian University

Stanisław Szczur (24 February 1955 – 11 November 2010) was a medievalist, professor of the Jagiellonian University.

== Biography ==
He passed matura in the Mikołaj Kopernik High School in Krosno and graduated in history from the Jagiellonian University. He obtained habilitation in 1991 and the title of professor in 1999. He was the Deputy Chairman of the Committee on Historical Sciences of the Polish Academy of Sciences.

=== Theft of antique books including incunabula ===
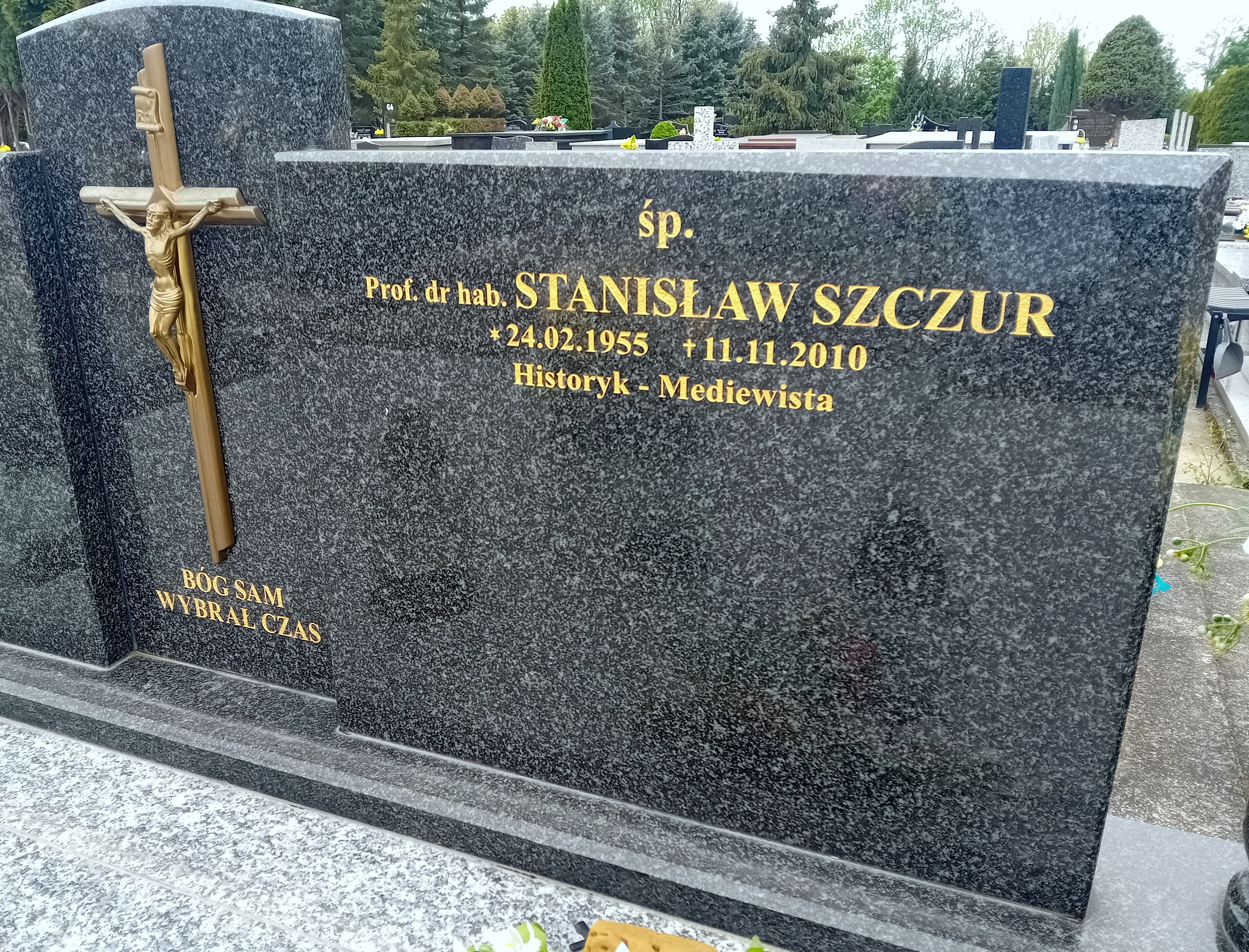
Grave of Stanisław Szczur in Krosno

In February 2006, he was arrested on charges of stealing 15th and 16th century antique books from the Higher Theological Seminary in Sandomierz. At the time of his arrest, he had eight incunabula and old prints from the library with him, which he took away. During the investigation, he pleaded guilty. On September 1, 2006, he was administratively dismissed from the Jagiellonian University. The prosecutor's office established that in the years 2003–2006 Stanisław Szczur stole a total of – according to various sources – over 70 or nearly 90 archival volumes, including Bernard Granollach's Lunarium from 1498 and two old prints from 1516. In addition to the theft, he was also accused of destroying some items by tearing out and cutting out pages. After the indictment was prepared in early December, he filed a motion to issue a conviction without a trial. The court granted his motion and sentenced him to three years' imprisonment, suspended for a five-year probation period, and a 72,000 Polish zloty fine. Stanisław Szczur was also ordered to pay 91,700 Polish zloty in restitution and 30,000 Polish zloty in court costs.

== Works ==
- Traktaty międzypaństwowe Polski piastowskiej. Kraków: Uniwersytet Jagielloński. 1990. ISBN 83-233-0370-3.
- Annaty Papieskie w Polsce w XIV wieku. Kraków: Wydawnictwo Uniwersytetu Jagiellońskiego. 1998. ISBN 83-233-1095-5.
- Papież Urban V i powstanie Uniwersytetu w Krakowie w 1364 r. Kraków: Towarzystwo Naukowe „Societas Vistulana”. 1999. ISBN 83-909094-2-1.
- Historia Polski. Średniowiecze. Kraków: Wydawnictwo Literackie. 2002. ISBN 83-08-03272-9. Reissued: 2004, 2005 and 2007.
- Skarbowość papieska w Polsce w latach 1378-1431. Kraków: Wydawnictwo Towarzystwa Naukowego "Societas Vistulana". 2008.
- Jan XXII. Kraków: Wydawnictwo WAM. 2010.

=== Editions ===
- Akta Kamery Apostolskiej. Vol. 3. Księga kolektora papieskiego Piotra syna Stefana 1373-1375. Kraków: Polska Akademia Umiejętności. 1994.
- Piastowie. Leksykon biograficzny. Kraków: Wydawnictwo Literackie. 1999. Co-editor: Krzysztof Ożóg.
- Polska i jej sąsiedzi w późnym średniowieczu. Kraków: Towarzystwo Naukowe „Societas Vistulana”. 2000. Co-editor: Krzysztof Ożóg.
- Poloniae merenti. Księga pamiątkowa jubileuszu sześćsetlecia odnowienia Uniwersytetu Jagiellońskiego 1400–2000. Kraków: Ośrodek Informacji i Promocji Uniwersytetu Jagiellońskiego. 2003.
- Servo veritatis: materiały międzynarodowej konferencji dla uczczenia 25-lecia pontyfikatu Jego Świątobliwości Jana Pawła II, Uniwersytet Jagielloński, 9-11 października 2003 r. Kraków: Wydawnictwo Naukowe Papieskiej Akademii Teologicznej. 2003. Co-editor: Stefan Koperek.
