= Dietrich of Haldensleben, Margrave of the Nordmark =

Dietrich of Haldensleben
- Margrave of the Nordmark
- Tenure: 965 – 983
- Born: 928-935
- Died: 25 August 985
- Issue: Bernard I of Haldensleben; Oda, Duchess of Poland; Mathilda of Haldensleben; Theutberga, Countess of Wettin
- Father: Wichmann the Elder
- Mother: Frederuna of Ringelheim

Dietrich (Theoderich, Theodoric) of Haldensleben (928/935-25 August 985) was a count in the Schwabengau, later also in the Nordthüringgau and the Derlingau, who was the first Margrave of the Northern March from 965 until the Great Slav Rising of 983. He also bore the title of a dux (duke) in contemporary sources. He was an ancestor of John V.

== Life ==
Dietrich was the ancestor of a comital branch named after the residence of Haldensleben in Eastphalia. He may have been a son of Count Wichmann the Elder and Frederuna, sister of Queen Matilda, and held large estates along the Elbe and Saale rivers.

A henchman of the royal Ottonian dynasty, Dietrich in 953 supported King Otto I of Germany against his revolting son Duke Liudolf of Swabia. He also fought - without success - against the Polabian Slavs settling on the Elbe river at the eastern rim of his Eastphalian home territory. In return Otto, Holy Roman Emperor since 962, appointed him margrave in the Northern March beyond the Elbe, the largest part of the former Marca Geronis after its dissolution upon the death of Margrave Gero in 965.

Dietrich was a harsh overlord. Together with Archbishop Adalbert of Magdeburg he enforced the Christianization of the local Slavic population and was instrumental in the execution of his rival Gero, Count of Alsleben. Owing to his pride as stated by the chronicler Thietmar of Merseburg (he allegedly once refused the marriage of one of his kinswoman to a Slav "dog"), in 983 the Slavic Lutici and Hevelli tribes sacked the lands of the eastern bishoprics of Havelberg and Brandenburg and reverted to paganism. According to the medieval chroniclers Adam of Bremen and Annalista Saxo, Dietrich was deprived of his march in the same year, though he later again appeared as a Saxon general and supported the minor king King Otto III of Germany against the claims to the throne raised by the Bavarian duke Henry the Wrangler.

According to the Annals of Quedlinburg, Dietrich died on 25 August 985.

== Issue ==
Dietrich married a woman of unknown name and they had the following children:

- Bernard I, father of Bernard II, Margrave of the Nordmark (1009-1018)
- Oda of Haldensleben, married Mieszko I, Duke of Poland
- Mathilda von Haldensleben, married the Hevelli chieftain Pribislaw (killed in battle 28 December 994), son of Tugimir, Prince of the Hevelli, who was in turn son of Baçlabić (Václav), Prince of the Stodorini
- Thietberga, married Dedo I, Count of Wettin.

Dietrich was succeeded as Margrave of the Nordmark by Lothar I in 983. His son Bernard I became margrave in 1009.
