= Kajetan Kalinowski =

Polish boxer (born 1999)

Personal information
- Born: 4 October 1999 (age 27) Lublin, Poland
- Height: 6 ft 1 in (185 cm)
- Weight: Light Heavyweight

Boxing career
- Reach: 78 in (198 cm)
- Stance: Orthodox

Boxing record
- Total fights: 14
- Wins: 13
- Win by KO: 7
- Losses: 1
- Draws: 0
- No contests: 0

Kajetan Kalinowski (born 4 October 1999) is a Polish professional boxer.

== Professional career ==
Kalinowski made his professional debut on October 2, 2020, against Alan Jachimowski. Kalinowski won the fight via a third-round TKO.

His next fight came on October 2, 2021, against Igor Jakubowski. Kalinowski won the fight via a first-round TKO.

His next fight came on March 19, 2022, against Rafał Rzeźnik. Kalinowski won the fight via a first-round TKO.

His next fight came on May 14, 2022, against Cristian Lopez. Kalinowski lost the fight via a Majority Decision, suffering his first career defeat.

His next fight came on October 1, 2022, against Jiří Svačina. Kalinowski won the fight via a Unanimous Decision.

His next fight came on February 11, 2023, against Damian Smagiel. Kalinowski won the fight via a first-round TKO.

His next fight came on June 2, 2023, against Bartosz Barczyński. Kalinowski won the fight via a Unanimous Decision.

His next fight came on December 2, 2023, against Maksym Mishchenko. Kalinowski won the fight via a Unanimous Decision.

In his next fight, he faced Łukasz Stanioch on March 2, 2024, for the vacant Republic of Poland and WBC Francophone Light Heavyweight titles. Kalinowski won the fight via a Unanimous Decision, winning his first two career championships in the process.

His next fight came on October 26, 2024, against Rafał Dudek. Kalinowski won the fight via a Unanimous Decision.

His next fight came on April 11, 2025, in a rematch against Rafał Dudek, this time for the vacant WBC Francophone and Baltic Light Heavyweight titles. Kalinowski won the fight via an eight-round knockout, winning both championships in the process.

His next fight came on September 20, 2025, against Yeison Gonzalez. Kalinowski won the fight via a first-round knockout.

His first title defenses of the WBC Francophone and Baltic Light Heavyweight titles came on December 13, 2025, against Paweł Stępień. Kalinowski won the fight via an eighth-round TKO, successfully defending his titles.

== Professional boxing record ==
14 fights	13 wins	1 loss
By knockout	7	0
By decision	6	1

No.	Result	Record	Opponent	Type	Round, time	Date	Location	Notes
14	Win	13–1	Robert Talarek	UD	6	3 Oct 2026	Hala Widowiskowo-Sportowa, Koszalin, Poland	
13	Win	12–1	Paweł Stępień	TKO	8 (10), 0:04	13 Dec 2025	Hala Stulecia, Sopot, Poland	Retained WBC Francophone and Baltic light heavyweight titles
12	Win	11–1	Yeison Gonzalez	KO	1 (8), 0:49	20 Sep 2025	Hala Sportowa, ul. Armii Krajowej 2E, Żukowo, Poland	
11	Win	10–1	Rafał Dudek	KO	8 (10), 1:36	11 Apr 2025	Amfiteatr Parku Strzeleckiego, Nowy Sącz, Poland	Won vacant WBC Francophone and Baltic light heavyweight titles
10	Win	9–1	Rafał Dudek	UD	8	26 Oct 2024	Hala Sportowa, ul. Armii Krajowej 2E, Żukowo, Poland	
9	Win	8–1	Łukasz Stanioch	UD	10	2 Mar 2024	Hala Widowiskowo-Sportowa, Koszalin, Poland	Won vacant WBC Francophone and Republic of Poland light heavyweight titles
8	Win	7–1	Maksym Mishchenko	UD	8	2 Dec 2023	Hala Sportowa Sokolnia, Kościerzyna, Poland	
7	Win	6–1	Bartosz Barczyński	UD	6	2 Jun 2023	Hala Sportowa, ul. Armii Krajowej 2E, Żukowo, Poland	
6	Win	5–1	Damian Smagiel	TKO	1 (6), 3:00	11 Feb 2023	Hala Widowiskowo-Sportowa, Stężyca, Poland	
5	Win	4–1	Jiří Svačina	UD	6	1 Oct 2022	Regionalne Centrum Turystyki i Sportu, Karlino, Poland	
4	Loss	3–1	Cristian Lopez	MD	6	14 May 2022	Gdański Teatr Szekspirowski, Gdańsk, Poland	
3	Win	3–0	Rafał Rzeźnik	TKO	1 (8), 2:24	19 Mar 2022	Hala Widowiskowo-Sportowa, Stężyca, Poland	
2	Win	2–0	Igor Jakubowski	TKO	1 (6), 2:46	2 Oct 2021	Hala Sportowa Sokolnia, Kościerzyna, Poland	
1	Win	1–0	Alan Jachimowski	TKO	3 (4), 0:55	2 Oct 2020	Hala Sportowo-Widowiskowa, Wielki Klincz, Poland	
