= Hassan Saku =

Ugandan boxer (born 1987)

Personal information
- Nickname: Bad News
- Born: January 15, 1989 (age 37) Kampala, Uganda
- Height: 5 ft 7 in / 170cm
- Weight: welterweight

Boxing career

Boxing record
- Total fights: 23
- Wins: 12
- Win by KO: 75%
- Losses: 11
- Draws: 0
- No contests: 1

Hassan Saku (born January 15, 1987), also known as "Hitman" and "Bad News", is a Ugandan professional boxer.

== Early life and background ==
Saku was born on January 15, 1987, in Mulago. Raised in a modest neighborhood in Kampala, Saku developed an interest in boxing at a young age due to the influence of local boxing legends and the sport's potential to offer an avenue out of poverty.

== Amateur boxing career ==
Saku started his amateur career during his teenage years by joining the Kampala Boxing Club. With the guidance of experienced coaches, he refined his skills and gained recognition in local competitions. Through his dedication and natural talent, he represented Uganda in various international amateur boxing tournaments, achieving multiple medals.

Saku participated in the African Amateur Boxing Championships, where he secured a silver medal in 2006, showcasing his potential on the continental stage.

== Professional boxing career ==
Saku began his professional boxing career in 2012, making his debut in matches held in Kampala and Sweden. His style in the ring, characterized by aggression and powerful punches, earned him a reputation as a skilled opponent. Throughout his professional journey, Saku has achieved numerous significant victories and earned various titles.

Saku landed a World Boxing Council International super welterweight title eliminator when he took on Russian Anton Solopov in Erkerberg on February 23, 2007. In an undercard bout in Dec 24, 2007, Saku won Caleb Amianda in Nairobi.

== Major fights and titles ==
- East and Central Africa Boxing Federation (ECABF) Title: In 2015, Saku won the ECABF lightweight title after defeating a highly-ranked opponent from Kenya. This victory established him as one of the leading boxers in the region.
- African Boxing Union (ABU) Title: In 2017, Saku clinched the ABU lightweight title in a closely contested match against a seasoned boxer from Nigeria. This title win was a significant milestone in his career, boosting his profile internationally.

== Professional record ==
12 Wins (75% knockouts, 11 Loss, 0 Draws, 1 Contest
Result	Record	Opponent	Date	Result	Location
Loss	10-11-2	(Poland) Robert Talarek	Nov 28, 2015	L-RTD	Rocklunda, Vasteraas, Sweden
Win	10-13-1	(Poland) Bartlomiej Grafka	Nov 8, 2014	W-UD	Rocklunda, Vasteraas, Sweden
Loss	14-0-0	(Germany) Nuhu Lawal	Nov 16, 2013	L-KO	Loewensaal, Nuremberg (Nürnberg), Germany
Win	5-10-1	(Latvia) Raimonds Sniedze	October 5, 2012	W-UD	(Sweden) Alvik Gamla Tryckeriet, Stockholm
Loss	5-0-0	(Sweden) Benjamin Kalinovic	April 27, 2012	L-UD	Cloetta Center, Linkoping, Sweden
Loss	3–0–1	(Italy) Michele Di Rocco	May 28, 2009	L-TKO	Pala De Andre, Ravenna, Italy
Loss	4–0–0	(Russia) Daniil Utenkov	April 24, 2009	L-UD	Atmosphere Night Club, Saint Petersburg, Russia
Win	4–4–0	(Tanzania) Hussein Chiwa	December 19, 2008	W-KO	Lugogo Stadium, Kampala, Uganda
Win	9–0–1	(South Africa) Chris van Heerden	July 25, 2008	L-TKO	Carousel Casino, Hammanskraal, South Africa
Loss	15–0–0	(Italy) Emanuele Della Rosa	April 24, 2008	L-PTS	Fiumicino, Italy
Loss	26-6-1	(Denmark) Allan Vester	April 4, 2008	L-UD	(Denmark) NRGi Arena, Aarhus
Loss	10-8-0	(Estonia) Albert Starikov	March 22, 2008	L-UD	(Estonia) Sport Hall Energia, Narva
Win	17-5-0	(Tanzania) Bagaza Mwambene	December 22, 2007	W-KO	(Uganda) Nakivubo Stadium, Kampala
Loss	9-11-0	(Latvia) Jurijs Boreiko	August 18, 2007	L-UD	(Sweden) Eriksdalshallen, Stockholm
Loss	13-1-1	(Australia) Anton Solopov	February 23, 2007	L-TKO	(Sweden) DIVS, Ekaterinburg
Win	1-5-0	(Kenya) Caleb Amianda	December 24, 2005	W-PTS	(Kenya) Kenyatta International Conference Centre, Nairobi
Win	1-4-0	(Kenya) Caleb Amianda	October 15, 2005	W-KO	(Uganda) Little Flowers Arena, Kampala
Win	3-2-0	(Kenya) Kevin Onyango	June 1, 2005	W-KO	(Kenya) WAB Hotel, Buru Buru, Nairobi
Win	2-2-1	(Kenya) Fred George	April 25, 2005	W-KO	(Tanzania) Dar-Es-Salaam
Win	0-4-1	(Uganda) Boblee Sebowa	January 26, 2005	W-TKO	(Uganda) Nakivubo Stadium, Kampala
Win	0-6-0	(Uganda) Franco Komakech	November 28, 2004	W-KO	(Uganda) Nakivubo Stadium, Kampala
Win	debut	(Uganda) Joseph Kimbowa	June 19, 2004	W-KO	(Uganda) Nakivubo Stadium, Kampala
Win	0-5-0	(Uganda) Franco Komakech	April 20, 2004	W-TKO	(Uganda) Nakivubo Stadium, Kampala

== See also ==
- Robert Talarek
- Mohamed Muruli
- Kassim Ouma
- Cornelius Boza Edwards
- Latibu Muwonge
- Godfrey Nyakana
