= Paweł Stępień =

Polish boxer (born 1990)

Personal information
- Born: 10 September 1990 (age 36) Szczecin, Poland
- Height: 6 ft 2 in (188 cm)
- Weight: Light Heavyweight

Boxing career
- Reach: 75 in (191 cm)
- Stance: Orthodox

Boxing record
- Total fights: 25
- Wins: 22
- Win by KO: 12
- Losses: 2
- Draws: 2
- No contests: 0

Paweł Stępień (born 10 September 1990) is a Polish professional boxer.

== Professional career ==
Stępień made his professional debut on December 12, 2015, against Przemysław Pikulik. Stępień won the fight via a first-round knockout.

After accumulating a career record of 4–0, he faced Norbert Dąbrowski on September 17, 2016, on the undercard of Krzysztof Głowacki vs. Oleksandr Usyk. Stępień won the fight via a Unanimous Decision.

After another three wins, he faced Michał Ludwiczak on May 12, 2018, for the vacant Republic of Poland International light heavyweight title. Stępień won the fight via a fourth-round knockout, winning his first career championship in the process.

His first title defense came on June 2, 2018, against Ricardo Marcelo Ramallo. Stępień won the fight via a first-round knockout, successfully defending his title in the process.

After a non-title victory over Yevgenii Makhteienko, his next title defense came on November 10, 2018, against Dmitry Sukhotsky. Stępień won the fight via a ninth-round TKO, successfully defending his title for a second time.

His next title defense came on July 6, 2019, against Marek Matyja. The bout ended in a Split Draw, meaning Stępień was still the champion afterwards, marking his third successful defense.

His next bout was a non-title fight against Geard Ajetović on March 7, 2020. Stępień won the fight via a Unanimous Decision.

In his next fight, he faced Marek Matyja in a rematch for the vacant Republic of Poland light heavyweight title on July 25, 2020. Stępień won the fight via a Split Decision, winning his second career championship in the process.

In his next fight, he faced the undefeated Deneb Diaz on May 30, 2021, for the vacant IBF Inter-Continental light heavyweight title. Stępień won the fight via a fifth-round knockout, winning his third career championship in the process.

After another three wins, he faced the undefeated Joshua Buatsi on May 6, 2023. Stępień lost the fight via a Unanimous Decision, suffering his first career defeat.

Following his loss, he returned eight months later in a bout against Petro Lakotskyi on January 27, 2024. Stępień won the fight via a Majority Decision.

His next fight came on September 20, 2024, against Sherzod Husanov. Stępień won the fight via a Unanimous Decision.

In his next fight, he faced Łukasz Stanioch on January 31, 2025, for the vacant WBC Frnacophone light heavyweight title. The bout ended in a Split Draw, resulting in neither fighter winning the championship.

In his next fight, he faced Kajetan Kalinowski on December 13, 2025, for the WBC Francophone and Baltic Light Heavyweight titles, which Kalinowski won in April of the same year. Stępień lost the fight via an eighth-round TKO, failing to win the championships in the process, and suffering his second career defeat.

== Professional boxing record ==
26 fights	22 wins	2 losses
By knockout	12	1
By decision	10	1
Draws	2	

No.	Result	Record	Opponent	Type	Round, time	Date	Location	Notes
26	Win	22–2–2	Yunior Menendez	UD	8	7 Nov 2026	Szczeciński Dom Sportu, Szczecin, Poland	
25	Win	21–2–2	Daniel Blenda Dos Santos	PTS	8	29 Aug 2026	Hotel Sheraton, Sopot, Poland	
24	Loss	20–2–2	Kajetan Kalinowski	TKO	8 (10), 0:04	13 Dec 2025	Hala Stulecia, Sopot, Poland	For WBC Francophone and Baltic light heavyweight titles
23	Draw	20–1–2	Łukasz Stanioch	SD	10	31 Jan 2025	Aqua Żyrardów, Żyrardów, Poland	For vacant WBC Francophone light heavyweight title
22	Win	20–1–1	Sherzod Husanov	UD	8	20 Sep 2024	Hala Widowiskowo-Sportowa, Chojnice, Poland	
21	Win	19–1–1	Petro Lakotskyi	MD	8	27 Jan 2024	Arena Kalisz, Kalisz, Poland	
20	Loss	18–1–1	Joshua Buatsi	UD	10	6 May 2023	bp pulse LIVE, Birmingham, England	
19	Win	18–0–1	Iago Kiziria	UD	8	5 Aug 2022	Amfiteatr nad Jeziorem Czos, Mrągowo, Poland	
18	Win	17–0–1	Ezequiel Maderna	MD	8	26 Mar 2022	Opera i Filharmonia Podlaska, Białystok, Poland	
17	Win	16–0–1	Hernan David Perez	UD	8	27 Nov 2021	Hala Widowiskowo-Sportowa, Ostrołęka, Poland	
16	Win	15–0–1	Deneb Diaz	KO	5 (10)	30 May 2021	Hala Podpromie, Rzeszów, Poland	Won vacant IBF Inter-Continental light heavyweight title
15	Win	14–0–1	Marek Matyja	SD	10	25 Jul 2020	Amfiteatr Miejski, Augustów, Poland	Won vacant Republic of Poland light heavyweight title
14	Win	13–0–1	Geard Ajetović	UD	8	7 Mar 2020	Hala Sportowa im. Olimpijczyków Polskich, Łomża, Poland	
13	Draw	12–0–1	Marek Matyja	SD	10	6 Jul 2019	Stadion Miejski, Rzeszów, Poland	Retained Republic of Poland International light heavyweight title
12	Win	12–0	Dmitry Sukhotsky	TKO	9 (10), 0:30	10 Nov 2018	Arena Gliwice, Gliwice, Poland	Retained Republic of Poland International light heavyweight title
11	Win	11–0	Yevgenii Makhteienko	KO	6 (8), 2:46	22 Sep 2018	Hala Sportowa im. Olimpijczyków Polskich, Łomża, Poland	
10	Win	10–0	Ricardo Marcelo Ramallo	KO	1 (10), 2:07	2 Jun 2018	G2A Arena, Rzeszów, Poland	Retained Republic of Poland International light heavyweight title
9	Win	9–0	Michał Ludwiczak	KO	4 (10), 2:09	12 May 2018	Hala Sportowa, Wałcz, Poland	Won vacant Republic of Poland International light heavyweight title
8	Win	8–0	Benson Mwakyembe	KO	1 (8), 1:49	10 Feb 2018	Hala Nysa, Nysa, Poland	
7	Win	7–0	Dayron Lester	KO	4 (8), 1:31	19 Aug 2017	Amfiteatr Międzyzdroje, Międzyzdroje, Poland	
6	Win	6–0	Artem Redko	TKO	1 (8), 2:06	25 Feb 2017	Enea Arena, Szczecin, Poland	
5	Win	5–0	Norbert Dąbrowski	UD	8	17 Sep 2016	Ergo Arena, Gdańsk, Poland	
4	Win	4–0	Vasyl Kondor	TKO	6 (6), 2:30	28 May 2016	Enea Arena, Szczecin, Poland	
3	Win	3–0	Dariusz Grajdek	KO	2 (4), 2:27	7 May 2016	Arena Jaskółka Tarnów, Tarnów, Poland	
2	Win	2–0	Przemysław Binienda	TKO	1 (4), 2:35	4 Mar 2016	Hala Sportowa ul. Żeromskiego 9, Sosnowiec, Poland	
1	Win	1–0	Przemysław Pikulik	KO	1 (4), 1:59	12 Dec 2015	Hala MOSiR, Ełk, Poland	
