= Muwonge =

Muwonge is a surname. Notable people with the surname include:

- Hamza Muwonge (born 1982), Ugandan footballer
- Latibu Muwonge (fl. 2019), Ugandan boxer
- Susan Muwonge (born 1977), Ugandan rally driver
