= Godfrey Nyakana =

Ugandan former lightweight boxer and politician

Personal information
- Nationality: Ugandan
- Born: Godfrey Nyakana; June 7, 1967 (age 59) Kampala, Uganda

Boxing career

Boxing record
- Total fights: 36
- Wins: 31
- Win by KO: 19
- Losses: 4
- Draws: 1
Medal record
Commonwealth Games
Gold medal – first place	1990 Auckland	Light middleweight

Godfrey Amooti Nyakana (born June 7, 1967) is a Ugandan former lightweight boxer and politician. He participated in 1990 Commonwealth Games that took place Auckland city, New Zealand where he won a gold medal. He won 31 games where 19 games were by KO, got 4 losses and drew one game in his professional career. He served as the National Resistance Movement chairperson for Kampala Central Division.

== Early life and amateur boxing ==
Godfrey Nyakana was born in Kampala, Uganda. He began his boxing career as an amateur. Nyakana's key victory in the period of his personal development was his winning of a gold medal at the light middleweight division of 1990 Commonwealth Games held in Auckland, New Zealand.

== Professional boxing career ==
Nyakana became professional on 1990 April 21 when he first met Tony Martel where he won by knockout with a record of 6-1-1. Over the course of his career, he had a win loss draw tally of 31-4-1 out of which he knocked out opponents from the ring nineteen times. Running from 1990 to 2003, during which time he engaged in several high-profile fights such as those held at Brooklyn's Gleason's Gym.

A documentary called TitleShot documents his journey and tribulations as a professional boxer including training sessions and games along with off-the-ring life.

31 Wins (19 knockouts, 4 Loss, 0 Draws, 1 Contest
Result	Record	Opponent	Date	Result	Location
Loss	18-8-1	(Tanzania) Maneno Oswald	Feb 13, 2003	L-KO	(Uganda) Nakivubo Stadium, Kampala
Win	2-4-0	(Democratic Republic of the Congo) Dieudonne Takou Kotonana	July 26, 2003	W-TKO	(Uganda) Nakivubo Stadium, Kampala
Win	7-5-0	(United States) Darryl Ruffin	Dec 25, 1997	W-TKO	(Uganda) Nakivubo Stadium, Kampala
Loss	28-7-1	(United States) Verno Phillips	August 29, 1997	L-TKO	(United States) City Center, Saratoga Springs
Win	22-12-1	(Dominican Republic) Joaquin Velasquez	March 14, 1997	W-UD	(United States) Pepsi Arena, Albany
Win	20-14-2	(France) Pascal Lustenberger	Nov 1, 1997	W-TKO	Izegem, Belgium
Loss	32-3-0	(Mexico) Jose Flores	May 20, 1996	L-TKO	(United States) Great Western Forum, Inglewood
Win	0-4-0	(United States) Nelson Echevarria	Feb 9, 1996	W-TKO	(United States) Host Inn, Sturbridge
Win	23-14-0	(United States) Darryl Lattimore	August 28, 1995	W-UD	(United States) Music Fair, Westbury
Win	7-2-1	(United States Virgin Islands) Christian Lloyd Joseph	March 17, 1995	W-SD	(United States) Fernwood Resort, Bushkill
Win	5-3-1	(United States) Rick Edson	April 3, 1995	W-TKO	(United States) Huntington Hilton Hotel, Melville
Win	18-6-1	(Italy) Santo Colombo	December 25, 1994	W-PTS	Izegem, Belgium
Win	7-34-0	(United States) Jose Vera	December 9, 1994	W-TKO	(United States) Worcester
Win	3-0-0	(Trinidad and Tobago) Anthony Joseph	October 13, 1994	W-TKO	(United States) Huntington Hilton Hotel, Melville
win	29-6-0	(Belgium) Patrick Vungbo	December 25, 1993	W_PTS	Izegem, Belgium
Win	16-1-3	(United States) Willy Wise	September 25, 1993	W-PTS	(United States) Mid-Hudson Civic Center, Poughkeepsie
Win	25-10-1	(United Kingdom) Del Bryan	January 2, 1993	W-PTS	(Luxembourg) Differdange
Win	14-3-0	(United Kingdom) Willie Beattie	November 7, 1992	W-KO	(Luxembourg) Differdange
Win	32-4-3	(France) Daniel Bicchieray	October 16, 1992	W-TKO	(France) Voglans
Win	9-17-3	(Cape Verde) Carlos Tavarez	May 29, 1992	W-RTD	(France) Amneville
Win	2-15-0	(Belgium) Mohammed Louati	January 31, 1992	W-KO	(Luxembourg) Centre Sportif Obercorn, Differdange
Win	20-6-2	(Italy) Marco Cipollino	December 25, 1991	W-KO	(Belgium) Izegem
Loss	13-7-0	(Italy) Habib Hammami	November 1, 1991	L-KO	(Belgium) Izegem
Win	4-38-1	(United States) Anthony Travis	September 27, 1991	W-KO	(Belgium) Sint Amandsberg
Win	11-2-0	(Belgium) Michel Berzigotti	June 1, 1991	W-TKO	(Belgium) Loncin
Win	18-3-0	(Belgium) Patrick Vungbo	April 27, 1991	W-PTS	(Belgium) Ardooie
Win	19-14-3	(Belgium) Freddy Demeulenaere	March 1, 1991	W-PTS	(Belgium) Mont Saint Amand
Win	6-4-2	(Belgium) Mehmet Demir	February 9, 1991	W-PTS	(Belgium) Roeselare
Win	0-3-0	(Dominican Republic) Eladio Morell	January 25, 1991	W-TKO	(Belgium) Middelkerke
Win	2-0-1	(Turkey) Buhran Zorlu	November 25, 1990	W-KO	(Belgium) Izegem
Win	1-1-0	(France) Thierry Belhadji	November 1, 1990	W-PTS	(Belgium) Izegem
Win	5-0-0	(French Guiana) Jean Marc Linguet	October 13, 1990	W-TKO	(Belgium) Ghent
Win	7-4-1	(Belgium) Marino Monteyne	May 12, 1990	W-PTS	(Belgium) Waasmunster
Win	6-1-1	(France) Tony Martel	April 21, 1990	W-KO	(Belgium) Sint Amandsberg

== Political career and advocacy ==
After retiring from professional boxing, Nyakana transitioned into politics. He served as the Mayor of Kampala Central Division after winning an election in 2006. Nyakana has also been an advocate for youth and sports development in Uganda. He has worked on various initiatives to promote boxing and other sports as a means to empower young people and keep them engaged in positive activities.

== Personal life ==
He was married to businesswoman Sarah Kizito, though their marriage ended after more than a decade.

== Controversies ==
In July 2022, Nyakana was accused of assaulting a police officer who had gone to arrest mobile thieves suspects at Hot-Spa and Massage parlor which is based in Mulungu, Munyonyo. He was arrested in Luzira and released after a week on bail by the Uganda Police on court orders.

Nyakana filed suit against Uganda Amateur Boxing Federation indicting the federation president Moses Muhangi leaving out some clubs to participating in the National Boxing Championship which happened between January 19 to February 3, 2019 at the MTN Arena in Lugogo. Nyakana requested the court to halt the activities from happening.

Nyakana was taken to High court - Land division over failure to repay David Luyiga 260 million for the land which he sold to him and did not give Luyiga the title.

In 2004, Nyakana house found in Bugoloobi was demolished by National Environment Management Authority in a move to recover wetlands. The Uganda Constitutional Court judgement was in support of NEMA decision because is house was built in a wetland which is against the laws, which states that "Wetlands could not be granted to private individuals/entities because the State holds such natural resources in trust for the citizenry and they must be preserved for the public benefit, in this case".

== See also ==
- Robert Talarek
- Mohamed Muruli
- Kassim Ouma
- Cornelius Boza Edwards
- Latibu Muwonge
