= Norbert Dąbrowski =

Polish boxer

Personal information
- Nickname: Noras
- Nationality: Polish
- Born: 26 August 1988 (age 38) Warsaw, Poland
- Height: 183 cm (6 ft 0 in)
- Weight: Super-middleweight; Light-heavyweight

Boxing career
- Reach: 184 cm (72 in)
- Stance: Southpaw

Boxing record
- Total fights: 34
- Wins: 23
- Win by KO: 10
- Losses: 9
- Draws: 2

Norbert Dąbrowski (born 26 August 1988) is a Polish professional boxer.

== Boxing career ==
Dąbrowski professional boxing debut 17 September 2010 in Olsztyn where he defeated by TKO first round Andrejs Suliko.

On 12 December 2016 Dąbrowski he will compete in Canada with Eleider Alvarez for WBC Light heavyweight nr.1 pretender.

== Professional boxing record ==
| 33 fights | 23 wins | 8 losses |
|---|---|---|
| By knockout | 10 | 1 |
| By decision | 13 | 7 |
| Draws | 2 | |

| No. | Result | Record | Opponent | Type | Round, time | Date | Location | Notes |
|---|---|---|---|---|---|---|---|---|
| 33 | Win | 23–8–2 | (Ukraine) Mykyta Trubchanin | KO | 2 (6), 1:46 | 05 Oct 2019 | Sport Place, Pieszyce, Poland | |
| 32 | Loss | 22–8–2 | (Russia) Umar Salamov | KO | 9 (12), 2:02 | 18 Apr 2019 | (Poland) Colosseum Sport Hal, Grozny, Russia | For WBO International light-heavyweight title |
| 31 | Win | 22–7–2 | (Poland) Robert Talarek | UD | 8 | 25 May 2018 | Stadion Narodowy, Warsaw, Poland | |
| 30 | Draw | 21–7–2 | (Poland) Jordan Kuliński | MD | 10 | 13 Oct 2017 | Hala Sportowa, ul. Berlinga, Nowy Dwor Mazowiecki, Poland | |
| 29 | Win | 21–7–1 | (Ukraine) Oleksandr Haraschenko | TKO | 7 (8), 2:58 | 7 Oct 2017 | OSiR, ul. Pomologiczna 10, Skierniewice, Poland | |
| 28 | Loss | 20–7–1 | (Poland) Robert Talarek | UD | 8 | 24 Jun 2017 | Ergo Arena, Gdańsk, Poland | |
| 27 | Win | 20–6-1 | (Poland) Michal Graszek | TKO | 1 (10), 1:56 | 17 Mar 2017 | Sport Place, Żyrardów, Poland | |
| 26 | Loss | 19–6–1 | (Colombia) Eleider Alvarez | UD | 10 | 10 Dec 2016 | Montreal Casino, Montreal, Canada | |
| 25 | Win | 19–5–1 | (Poland) Marek Matyja | SD | 8 | 22 Oct 2016 | Salt Mine, Wieliczka, Poland | |
| 24 | Loss | 18–5–1 | (Poland) Paweł Stępień | UD | 8 | 17 Sep 2016 | Ergo Arena, Gdańsk, Poland | |
| 23 | Draw | 18–4–1 | (Poland) Jordan Kuliński | SD | 6 | 18 Mar 2016 | Aqua Żyrardów, Żyrardów, Poland | |
| 22 | Win | 18–4 | (Poland) Bartosz Szwarczynski | TKO | 2 (6), 0:43 | 21 Jul 2015 | Legia Fight Club, Warsaw, Poland | |
| 21 | Loss | 17–4 | (Belarus) Ivan Murashkin | SD | 4 | 27 Jun 2015 | Sport Place, Krynica Zdrój, Poland | |
| 20 | Loss | 17–3 | (Germany) Dominic Boesel | UD | 12 | 2 May 2015 | Sparkassen-Arena, Jena, Thüringen, Germany | For WBO Inter-Continental light-heavyweight title. |
| 19 | Win | 17–2 | (Poland) Robert Talarek | MD | 8 | 31 Mar 2015 | OSiR Hall, Brodnica, Poland | |
| 18 | Win | 16–2 | (Poland) Bartlomiej Grafka | UD | 6 | 19 Sep 2014 | MOSiR Hall, Radom, Poland | |
| 17 | Win | 15–2 | (Belarus) Andrei Salakhutdzinau | TD | 4 (6) | 10 May 2014 | OSiR Hall, Brodnica, Poland | |
| 16 | Loss | 14–2 | (Poland) Marek Matyja | SD | 6 | 15 Mar 2014 | Hotel Arłamów, Arłamów, Poland | |
| 15 | Win | 14–1 | (Latvia) Martins Kukulis | UD | 4 | 01 Mar 2014 | Sport Hall, Suwałki, Poland | |
| 14 | Loss | 13–1 | (Poland) Robert Świerzbiński | UD | 8 | 16 Nov 2013 | School Hall, Białystok, Poland | |
| 13 | Win | 13–0 | (Georgia (country)) Mindia Nozadze | TKO | 2 (6), 0:45 | 09 Nov 2013 | Sport Place, Ełk, Poland | |
| 12 | Win | 12–0 | (Latvia) Olegs Fedotovs | UD | 6 | 10 May 2013 | Urania Hall, Olsztyn, Poland | |
| 11 | Win | 11–0 | (Hungary) Ferenc Zold | TKO | 4 (8), 1:18 | 01 Mar 2013 | Sport Hall, Częstochowa, Poland | |
| 10 | Win | 10–0 | (Hungary) Laszlo Kamhal | TKO | 3 (6), 2:50 | 16 Nov 2012 | Hotel, Zielonka, Poland | |
| 9 | Win | 9–0 | (Hungary) Norbert Szekeres | UD | 6 | 13 Oct 2012 | Salt Mine, Wieliczka, Poland | |
| 8 | Win | 8–0 | (Ukraine) Pavlo Sukmanskyy | TKO | 4 (6), 3:00 | 01 Jun 2012 | Hala na Podpromiu, Rzeszów, Poland | |
| 7 | Win | 7–0 | (Italy) Endrit Vuka | RTD | 3 (6), 3:00 | 17 Feb 2012 | Sport Hall, Olsztyn, Poland | |
| 6 | Win | 6–0 | (France) Anouar Boumejjane | UD | 6 | 26 Nov 2011 | MOSiR, Białystok, Poland | |
| 5 | Win | 5–0 | (Estonia) Anton Sjomkin | MD | 6 | 05 Aug 2011 | Hala Polonia, Częstochowa, Poland | |
| 4 | Win | 4–0 | (Italy) Matteo Rossi | UD | 6 | 25 Jun 2011 | Sport Hall, Ostrowiec Świętokrzyski, Poland | |
| 3 | Win | 3–0 | (Croatia) Gordan Glisic | UD | 6 | 11 Dec 2010 | Sport Hall, Grodzisk Mazowiecki, Poland | |
| 2 | Win | 2–0 | (Latvia) Andrejs Tolstihs | UD | 4 | 05 Nov 2010 | Sport Hall, Chełm, Poland | |
| 1 | Win | 1–0 | (Latvia) Andrejs Suliko | TKO | 1 (4), 1:03 | 17 Sep 2010 | Urania Hall, Olsztyn, Poland | |
