= Brodnica Castle =

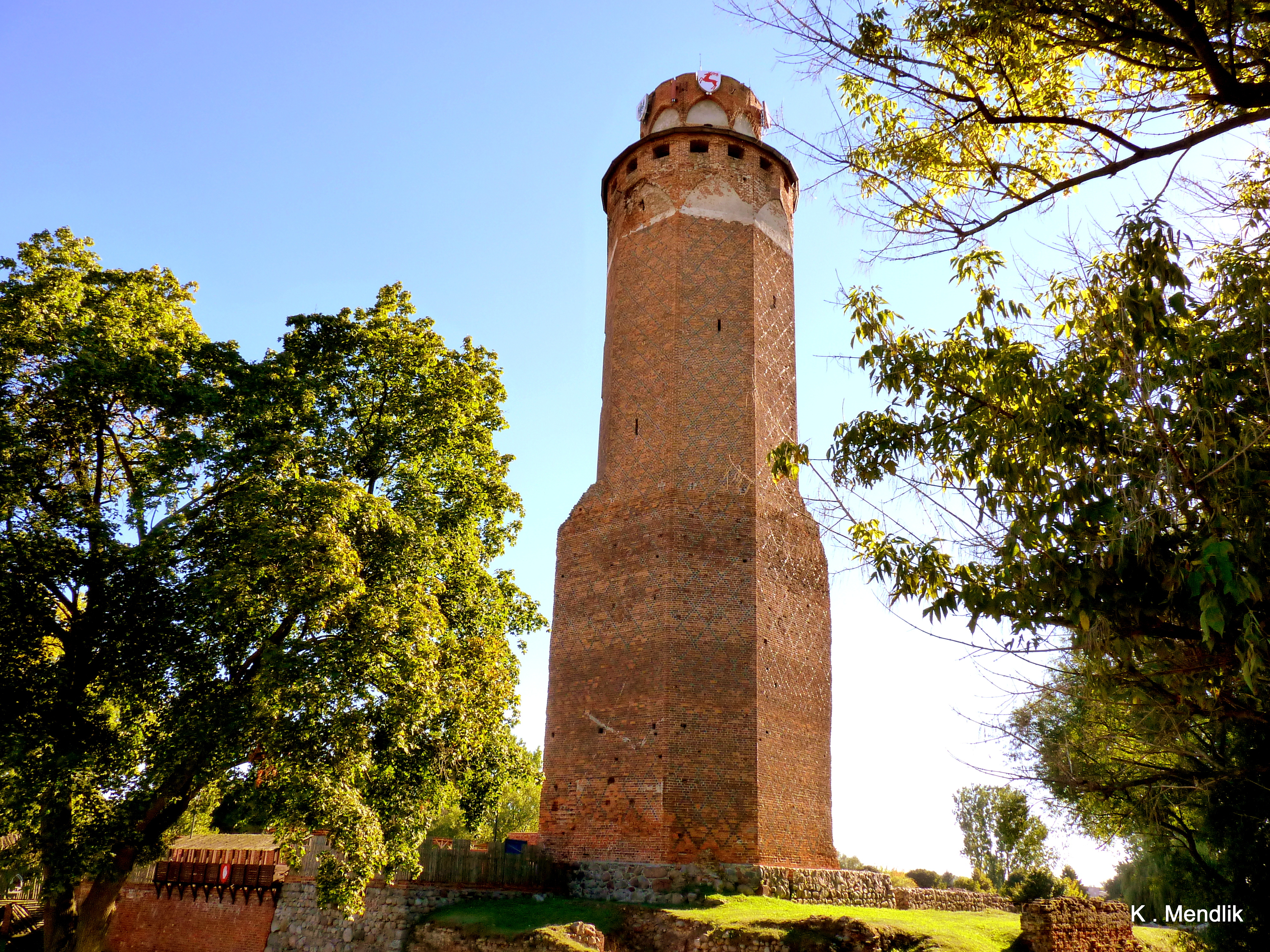
- Teutonic Tower

- Location of the Brodnica Castle in Poland Brodnica Castle (Kuyavian-Pomeranian Voivodeship)
- 53°15′27″N 19°23′55″E
- Location: Brodnica, Kuyavian-Pomeranian Voivodeship; Poland

History
- Built: 1305 or 1312 to 1317 or 1330
- Demolished: 1550 (fire), 1785 (deconstruction)

Site notes
- Height: Peak of the Teutonic Tower: 54 m
- Architectural style: Gothic

Brodnica Castle is a well fortified castle in Brodnica, Poland.

== Description ==
The castle is built in a square formation. The four wings of the castle surrounded the central courtyard. A 54-metre tower provided an entrance to the second floor of the castle. In the corners of the castle were small look-out towers, which stick out from the castle's square shape. The castle basements were used as utility rooms. The underground rooms performed various functions: a chapel, refectory, chapter house, infirmary, chamber of the commander and other specialised rooms. Entries to them lead to the gallery surrounding the courtyard. The second floor included from the side of the courtyard magazines and a granary, and an additional defensive porch within castle walls. By the main tower there is a gate to which access was provided by a former drawbridge. It was a key part of the castle's defense complex. The pre-castle fortification was placed between the town and the castle.

== History ==
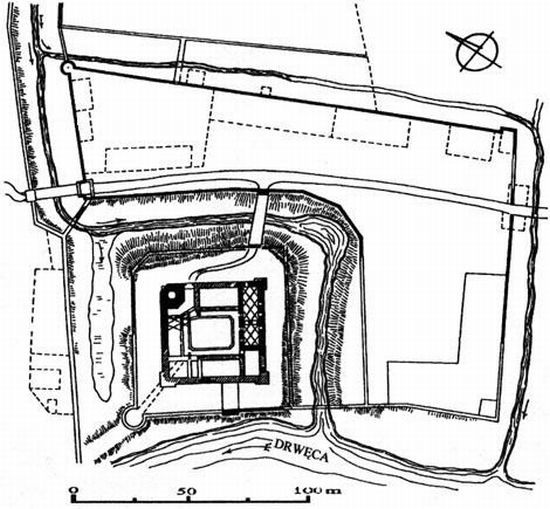
Plan of the Brodnica Castle

The building of the Teutonic castle in Brodnica began in the fourteenth century, taking almost a whole century to complete. In 1466, the castle complex became part of the Kingdom of Poland. After a fire in 1550, the rebuilding of the castle was done so by the Starosta Rafał Działyński. During the Swedish-Polish Wars the castle began to turn into ruins. In 1785, King Frederick II of Prussia ordered do dismantle the ruins, but his orders were soon stopped by Frederick Wilhelm IV. The fate of the palace of Anna Wazówna was sealed by a fire in 1945.

The palace was restored in the 1960s. Currently, the castle houses a museum, and the palace a library.

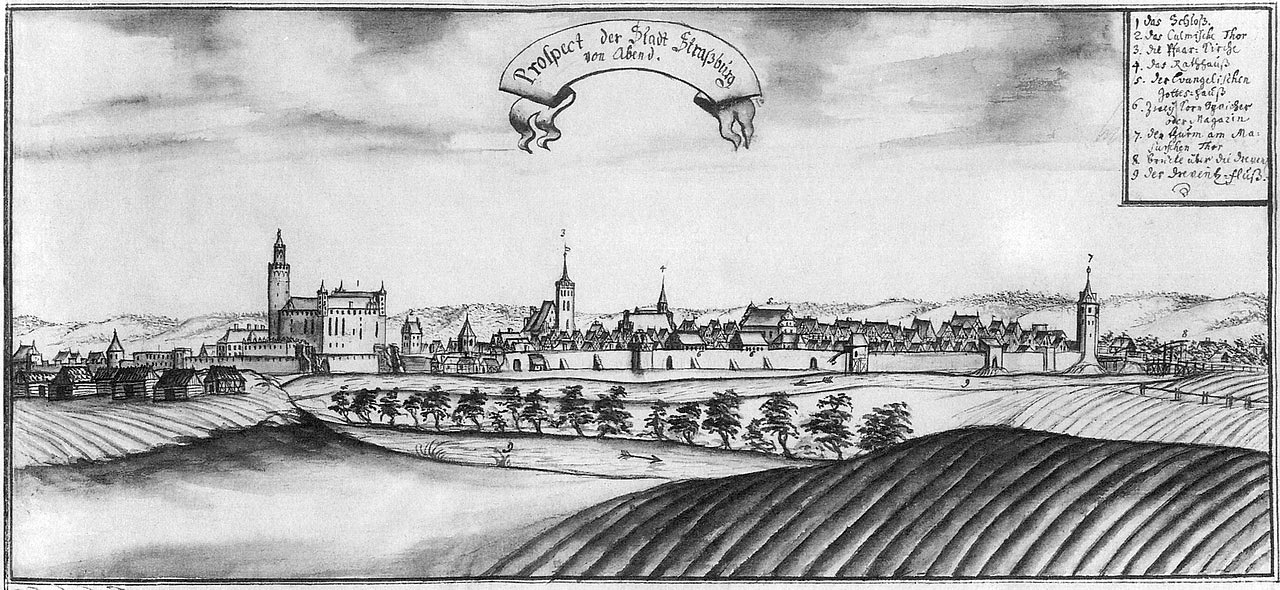
Brodnica in the during 1738–1745, with a view of the castle. Drawing by Friedrich Steiner

== See also ==
- Castles in Poland
