= Sarah Kizito =

Ugandan businesswoman and entrepreneur

- Citizenship: Ugandan
- Occupations: Businesswoman and entrepreneur
- Organization: Nalongo Estates Limited
- Known for: Proprietor and managing director of Nalongo Estates Limited
- Children: 2

Sarah Kizito is a Ugandan businesswoman and entrepreneur known for involvement in the management of Centenary Park in Kampala through Nalongo Estates Limited. She gained widespread recognition in Uganda's business and public circles due to prolonged legal and administrative disputes involving the park, the Kampala Capital City Authority (KCCA), and infrastructure development projects in Kampala.

== Career ==
Sarah Kizito is the proprietor and managing director of Nalongo Estates Limited, a company that managed Centenary Park, a recreational space located along Jinja Road in Kampala. The company entered into a management agreement with the then Kampala City Council in 2006 to develop and maintain the park as a public recreational area.

Under the management, Centenary Park became one of Kampala's notable entertainment and leisure centers, hosting restaurants, salons, bridal businesses and social events. Kizito was also associated with the bridal beauty business industry in Kampala through her business brand "Lady Charlotte", which became popular in the 1990s and early 2000s.

== Centenary Park dispute ==
Kizito became the subject of national attention due to disputes between Nalongo Estates Limited and Kampala Capital City Authority over the ownership, lease renewal and management of Centenary Park. KCCA argued the Nalongo Estates had continued occupying the land after the expiry of its lease in 2016 and accused the company of obstructing public infrastructure projects, including the Kampala Flyover Project, sewerage works by the National Water and Sewerage Corporation and the electricity infrastructure relocation.

In 2017, Parliament's Committee on Commissions, Statutory Authorities and State Enterprises (COSASE) investigated the dispute. During committee proceedings, Sarah Kizito defended her company's occupation of the park and argued that her lease deserved renewal.

In 2020, reports indicated that the government brokered an agreement allowing part of the land to be handed over for the Kampala Flyover Project while Nalongo Estates retained a section of the park.

== Personal life ==
Sarah Kizito was married to a former boxer and politician, Godfrey Nyakana , though their marriage ended after more than a decade. Nyakana won a gold medal for Uganda at the 1990 Commonwealth Games and later served as chairman of Kampala Central Division.

Sarah Kizito has 2 children.

== See also ==
- Godfrey Nyakana
