= Latibu Muwonge =

Personal information
- Nickname: The Dancing Master
- Nationality: Ugandan
- Height: 140 lbs (63.5 kg)
- Weight: Super Lightweight

Boxing career
- Stance: orthodox

Boxing record
- Total fights: 9
- Wins: 8
- Losses: 1
- Draws: 0
- No contests: 3

Latibu Muwonge, also known as "The Dancing Master", is a professional boxer from Uganda who competes in the super lightweight division. He was ranked second in Africa with Africa Super Lightweight Title as of March 2024 by the World Boxing Council (WBC).

== Early career ==
Muwonge made his professional debut on March 22, 2019, at the MTN Arena Lugogo in Kampala, Uganda. In that fight, he secured a unanimous decision victory against Kenneth Kaunda. This marked the beginning of a promising career that would see him climb the ranks in the super lightweight division.

== Major fights and titles ==
On March 10, 2023, at Club Obligato in Kampala, Muwonge faced Albano Clement for the vacant African Boxing Union African Super Lightweight title. He emerged victorious, adding a prestigious title to his name. He continued to showcase his skills in subsequent fights. On November 11, 2023, he defeated Ibrahim Odhiambo at Club Obligato in Kampala. His most recent bout took place on March 2, 2024, at Lords Wembley Sports Complex in Shukura. Despite a valiant effort, Muwonge lost to Faisal Abubakari by unanimous decision.

== Professional record ==
8 Wins (0% knockouts), 1 Loss, 0 Draws, 3 Contest
Result	Record	Opponent	Date	Result	Location
Loss	15-0-0	(Ghana) Faisal Abubakari	March 2, 2024	L-UD	Lords Wembley Sports Complex, Shukura, Ghana
Win	2-7-0	(Ghana) Ibrahim Odhiambo	Nov 11, 2023	W-UD	(Uganda) Club Obligato, Kampala
Win	7-3-1	(Tanzania) Albano Clement	March 10, 2023	W-SD	(Uganda) Club Obligato, Kampala
Win	5-2-0	(Tanzania) Ally Mbukwa	Feb 3, 2023	W-UD	(Uganda) Club Obligato, Kampala
Win	3-1-0	(Tanzania) Ali Mkojani	Dec 12, 2022	W-UD	(Uganda) Club Obligato, Kampala
Win	14-15-2	(Uganda) George Owano	August 13, 2022	W-UD	(Uganda) New Obligato, Bat Valley, Kampala
Win	3-1-2	(Kenya) Emmanuel Chivoli Shitambasi	July 8, 2022	W-UD	(Uganda) IUEA Auditorium Theatre Kansanga, Kampala
Win	2-0-1	(Uganda) Serwada Sadam Mukasa	March 5, 2022	W-UD	(Uganda) Jahazi Pier, Munyonyo, Kampala
Win	1-1-0	(Uganda) Kenneth Kaunda	March 22, 2019	W-UD	(Uganda) MTN Arena Lugogo, Kampala

== Family connections ==
Latibu Muwonge is the younger brother of Ugandan musician Yung Mulo.

== See also ==
- Robert Talarek
- Mohamed Muruli
- Kassim Ouma
- Cornelius Boza Edwards
- Hassan Saku
