= Brodnica =

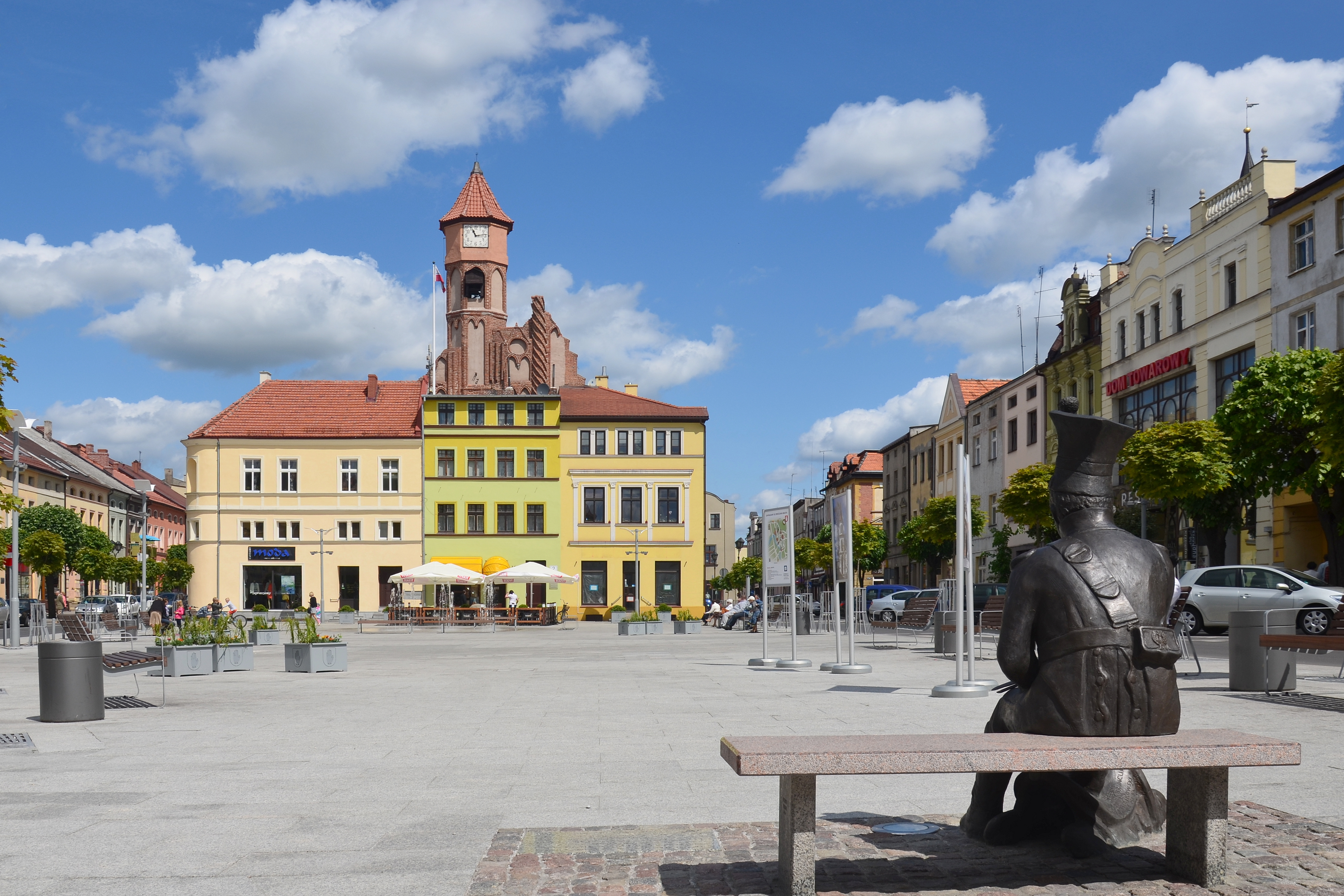
- Market Square

- Flag Coat of arms

- Location within Poland
- Coordinates: 53°15′35″N 19°23′44″E
- Country: Poland
- Voivodeship: Kuyavian-Pomeranian Voivodeship
- County: Brodnica
- Gmina: Brodnica (urban gmina)
- Established: 13th century
- Town rights: 1298

Government
  - Mayor: Jarosław Radacz

Area
  - Total: 22.87 km^{2} (8.83 sq mi)

Population (31 December 2021)
  - Total: 28,536
  - Density: 1,248/km^{2} (3,232/sq mi)
- Time zone: UTC+1 (CET)
  - Summer (DST): UTC+2 (CEST)
- Postal code: 87–300 to 87–302
- Area code: +48 56
- Car plates: CBR
- Climate: Dfb
- Website: http://www.brodnica.pl

Brodnica [brɔdˈɲit͡sa] (German: Strasburg) (Note: later also Strasburg in Westpreußen or Strasburg an der Drewenz) is a town in northern Poland with 28,574 inhabitants as of 2014. It is the seat of Brodnica County in the Kuyavian-Pomeranian Voivodeship. The nearby Brodnica Landscape Park, a protected area, gets its name from Brodnica.

Founded in the Middle Ages by the Teutonic Order, Brodnica is a former royal town of Poland. It features heritage sites in a variety of styles, including Gothic, Renaissance, Baroque and Neoclassical. Landmarks include medieval towers, gates and churches, preserved market squares, and a regional museum. Brodnica is the home of the oldest continuously operating Polish bank, and was the place of a Polish victory over invadings Russians in 1920.

== History ==
=== Early history ===
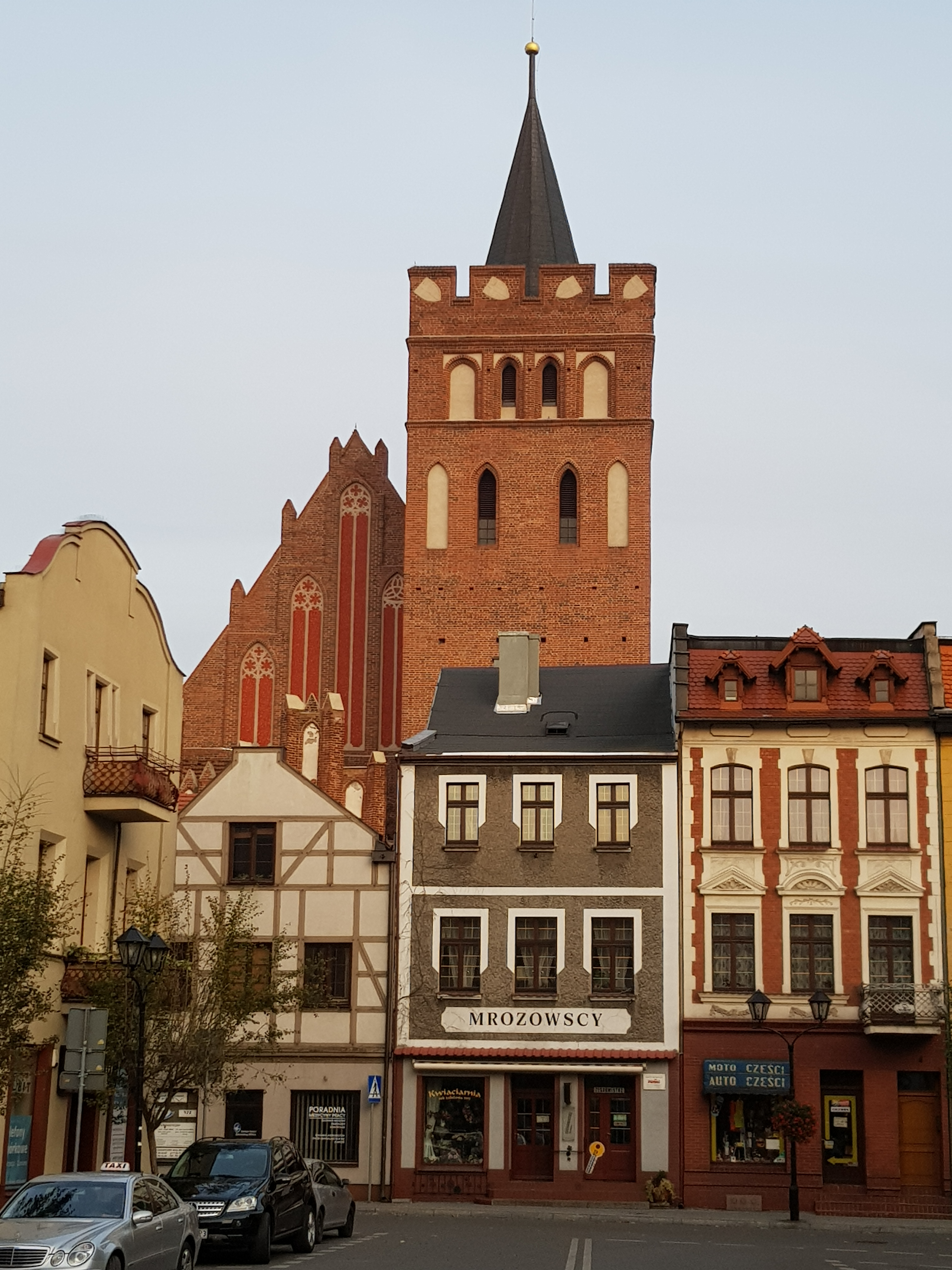
Gothic Saint Catherine church seen from the Market Square

The territory formed part of Poland after the country's establishment in the 10th century. The settlement of Michałowo (present-day neighbourhood of Brodnica) was established, which by 1240 became the seat of a castellany. Michałowo was a local administrative, military, judicial, commercial and religious center. It was located on an important trade route connecting Mazovia and Pomesania, and in 1252 a customs chamber was mentioned.

The first reference to the town dates from 1263, when the area was part of the State of the Teutonic Order. In 1285–1370 the construction of the Gothic Church of St. Catherine took place. The settlement received town privileges in 1298 under the German name Strasburg. In 1414, a Polish–Teutonic truce was signed there, ending the Hunger War. In 1440, the town was one of the founding members of the Prussian Confederation, which opposed Teutonic rule, and upon the request of which King Casimir IV Jagiellon reincorporated the territory to the Kingdom of Poland in 1454. On 28 May 1454 the town pledged allegiance to the Polish King in Thorn (Toruń). After the end of the Thirteen Years' War, the Teutonic Knights renounced claims to the town, and recognized it as part of Poland. It became a royal town of the Polish Crown, administratively located in the Chełmno Voivodeship in the provinces of Royal Prussia and Greater Poland. In the Teutonic state the town was the seat of the Commander; in the Polish Kingdom it was the capital of the district starosty, and the former Commander's lands were then royal property.

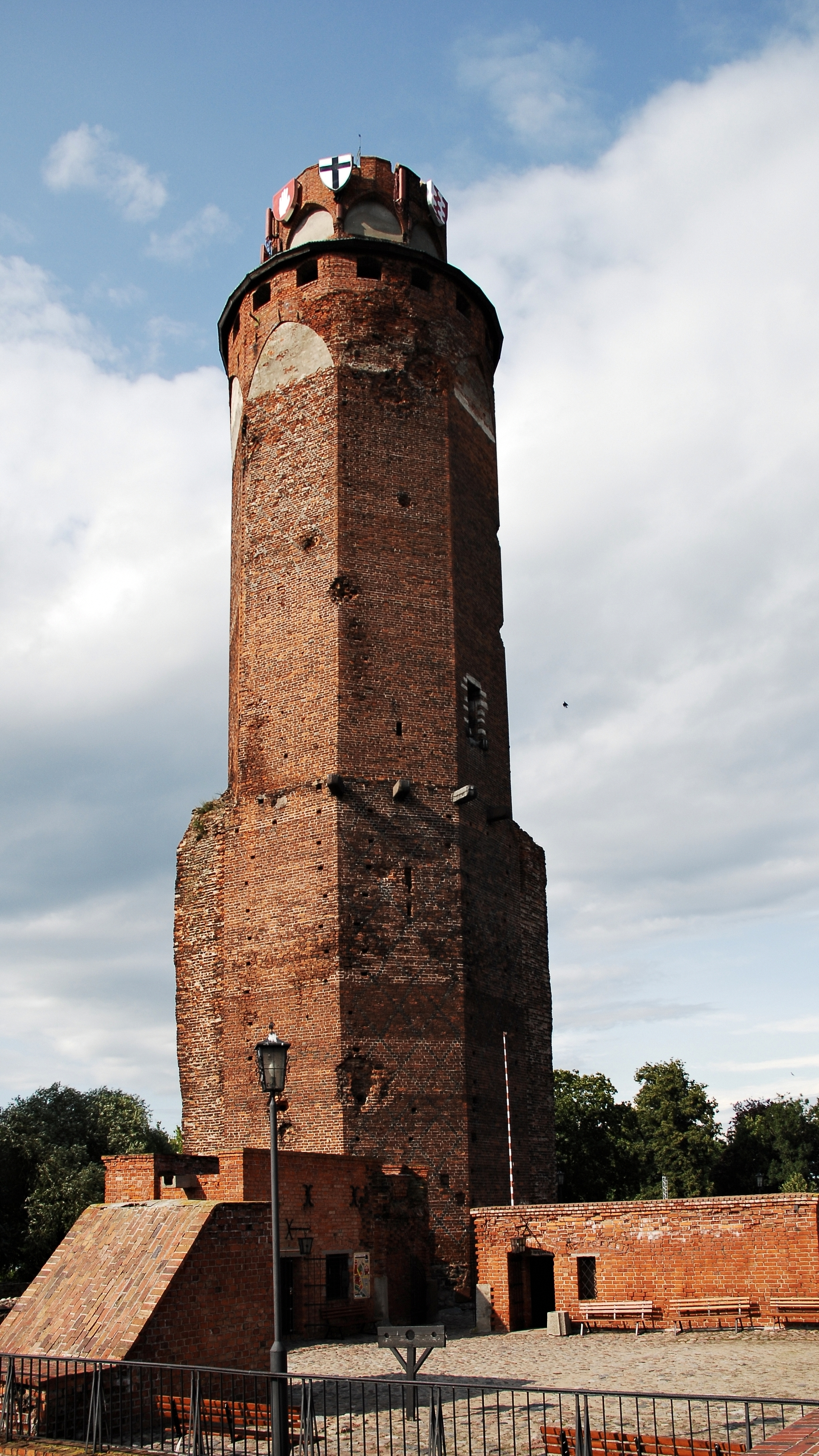
Brodnica Castle tower, the highest Gothic tower in Poland east of the Vistula, today a museum

A favourable location on the intersection of important routes used for transportation of different goods (wood, fish, furs, animal skin, grain, wool) accelerated the development of the town, making it an important trading centre, the status still reflected in the number of well-preserved granaries along the Drwęca. Between 1486 and 1604 the town belonged to the Działyński family, then between 1604 and 1625 to Anna Vasa of Sweden who was the royal sister of Sigismund III Vasa, King of Poland, Lithuania, and Sweden. In later years it was the property Queen Cecily Renata, Chancellor Jerzy Ossoliński, Queen Maria Casimira, and Marshal Franciszek Bieliński.

=== Late modern period ===
Brodnica was annexed by the Kingdom of Prussia in 1772, during the First Partition of Poland, but in 1807, during the Napoleonic Wars, it became part of the short-lived Duchy of Warsaw. In 1815, Brodnica, known as Strasburg in German, was again annexed by Prussia after the Congress of Vienna. After 1785, the Prussians dismantled the Brodnica Castle, preserving only the tower, which is currently the highest Gothic tower in Poland east of the Vistula, and serves as a museum and a watchtower. The town had a Protestant church, a Catholic church, a synagogue, a grammar school, a district court, a main customs office and several commercial operations.

The 19th century saw 20 thousand Polish soldiers interned after the failure of the November Uprising (1830–1831) and many townspeople and noblemen involved in the January Uprising (1863). Masovian insurgents sought refuge from Russian persecution in the region after the failure of the January Uprising. Bank Spółdzielczy w Brodnicy, which is the oldest continuously operating Polish bank, was established in 1862. In 1873 a Polish philomath organization was founded in the local gymnasium, whose activity ended in 1901 due to Germany's anti-Polish policies.

Following the unification of Germany in 1871, the town became part of the Prussian-led German Empire. Between 1886 and 1910, Strasburg received railway connections with Soldau (Działdowo), Graudenz (Grudziądz), Deutsch Eylau (Iława), Sierpc and Jabłonowo Pomorskie, which made it an important railway junction and triggered industrial progress. In the 19th century, the Chełmno Land (and Brodnica in particular) was a refuge for Polish patriots who contributed greatly to social, cultural and economic life of the region, like Ignacy Łyskowski.

According to the 1910 German census, the city of Strasburg had a population of 7,951. Of this population, 3,815 (48%) reported German as their sole mother tongue, while 3,641 (46%) reported Polish, with the remaining 6% reporting as bilingual; the Jewish population numbered 286 (3.6%), all of whom were counted as German-speaking.

=== Interbellum ===
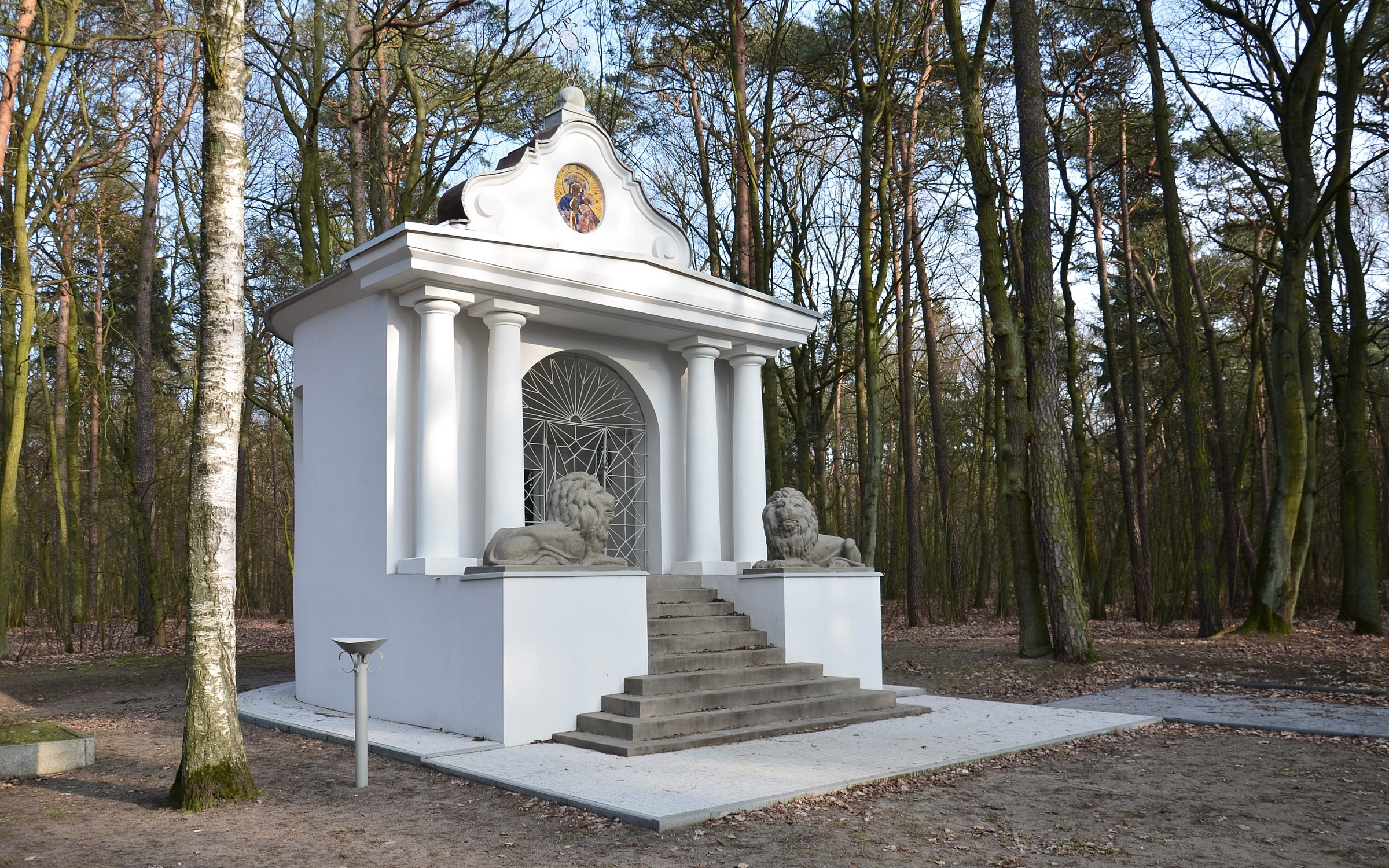
Chapel dedicated the fallen Polish defenders of Brodnica of 1920

In January 1920, after the end of World War I and the Treaty of Versailles, the town, under its Polish name Brodnica, was reintegrated with Poland, which had recently regained independence. On 18 August 1920, the town was the site of a Polish victory over the invading Soviets in the Battle of Brodnica during the Polish–Soviet War. In the 1920s, the town was visited by highest Polish dignitaries: Prime Minister Wincenty Witos, Marshal Józef Piłsudski and President Stanisław Wojciechowski. In 1934, the settlement of Michałowo, pre-dating Brodnica, was included within the town limits of Brodnica.

=== World War II ===
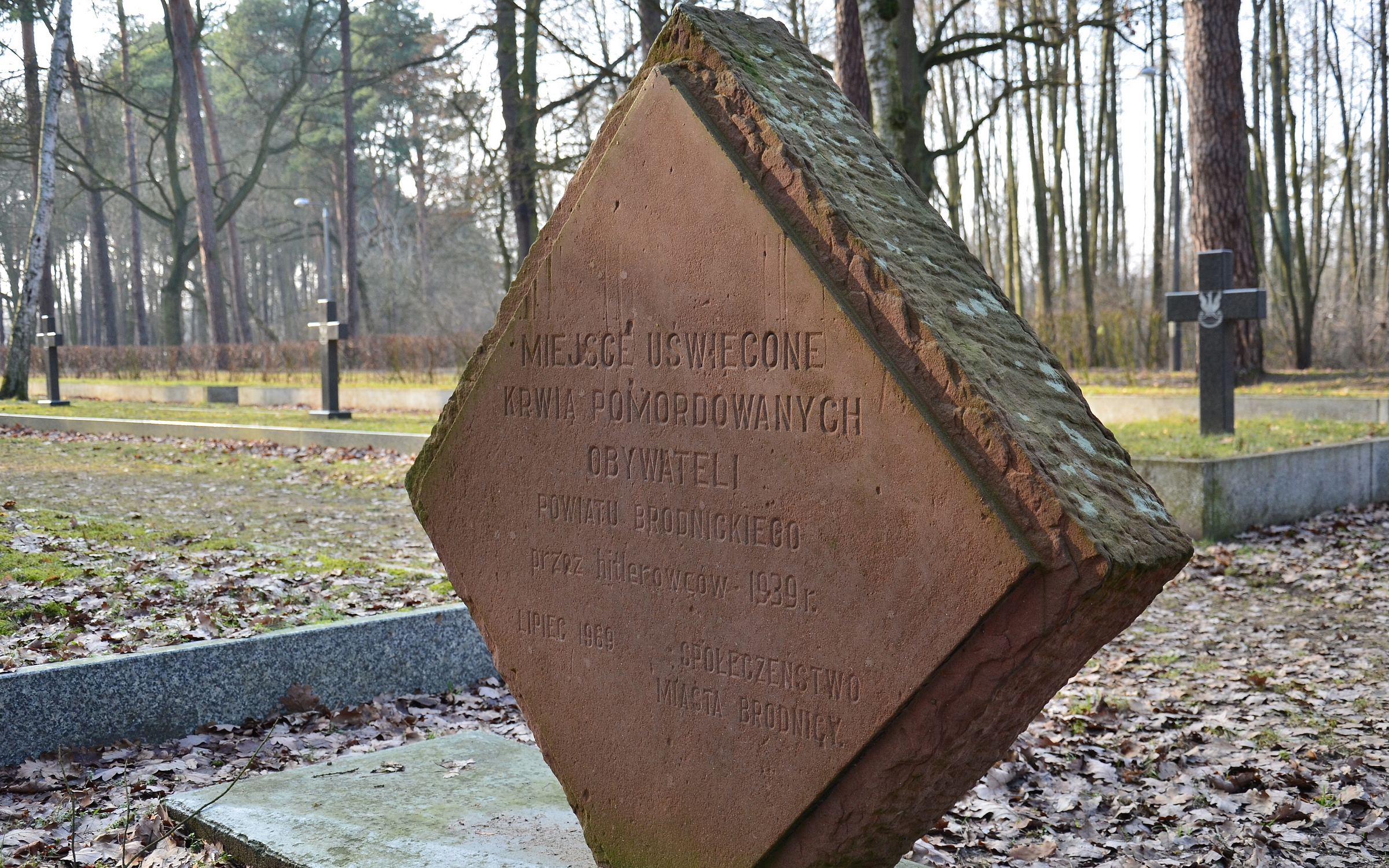
Memorial at the site of German executions of Poles in 1939

During the occupation of Poland (World War II), in 1939, the Germans carried out mass arrests of local Poles, who were later murdered in the area or deported to Nazi concentration camps. Some of these Poles were murdered in Skrwilno between 15 October and 15 November 1939 and in Brzezinki in October 1939. The interwar principal of the local high school, Klemens Malicki, was among the Polish principals and teachers murdered in the Oranienburg concentration camp as part of the Intelligenzaktion Pommern. In 1940–1941, the Nazis carried out expulsions of Poles, whose homes, shops and workshops were then handed over to German colonists as part of the Lebensraum policy. An Einsatzgruppen penal camp was operated in the town during the occupation, and in 1944, the Nazis also established a subcamp of the Stutthof concentration camp, intended for female prisoners.

The Polish resistance was active in the town, including local units of the Union of Armed Struggle-Home Army, Grunwald and Military Organization Lizard Union. The local Military Organization Lizard Union was particularly active in espionage of German activity.

The German occupation ended in January 1945. The Soviet-installed communists persecuted the Polish resistance, and many were imprisoned or even executed in Brodnica.

=== Post-war period ===
In 1970, the first archaeological excavations in Michałowo were conducted.

In 1975–1998, it was administratively located in the Toruń Voivodeship.

== Climate ==
Climate in this area has mild differences between highs and lows, and there is adequate rainfall year-round. The Köppen Climate Classification subtype for this climate is "Cfb". (Marine West Coast Climate).

Climate data for Brodnica
Month	Jan	Feb	Mar	Apr	May	Jun	Jul	Aug	Sep	Oct	Nov	Dec	Year
Record high °C (°F)	15.0 (59.0)	16.6 (61.9)	24.1 (75.4)	30.0 (86.0)	34.0 (93.2)	36.2 (97.2)	38.2 (100.8)	37.7 (99.9)	34.1 (93.4)	27.3 (81.1)	20.2 (68.4)	16.8 (62.2)	38.2 (100.8)
Mean daily maximum °C (°F)	2.3 (36.1)	2.9 (37.2)	8.3 (46.9)	13.6 (56.5)	19.4 (66.9)	22.1 (71.8)	24.6 (76.3)	24.5 (76.1)	19.3 (66.7)	13.9 (57.0)	6.7 (44.1)	3.2 (37.8)	13.4 (56.1)
Daily mean °C (°F)	−1.2 (29.8)	−0.7 (30.7)	4.0 (39.2)	9.8 (49.6)	14.9 (58.8)	18.2 (64.8)	20.1 (68.2)	19.8 (67.6)	15.3 (59.5)	9.9 (49.8)	4.4 (39.9)	0.2 (32.4)	9.6 (49.3)
Mean daily minimum °C (°F)	−4.6 (23.7)	−4.3 (24.3)	−0.3 (31.5)	6.0 (42.8)	10.3 (50.5)	14.3 (57.7)	15.5 (59.9)	15.1 (59.2)	11.3 (52.3)	5.9 (42.6)	2.1 (35.8)	−2.8 (27.0)	5.7 (42.3)
Record low °C (°F)	−28.5 (−19.3)	−27.6 (−17.7)	−21.3 (−6.3)	−6.8 (19.8)	−3.0 (26.6)	1.1 (34.0)	4.7 (40.5)	3.0 (37.4)	−3.8 (25.2)	−6.9 (19.6)	−15.2 (4.6)	−22.4 (−8.3)	−28.5 (−19.3)
Average precipitation mm (inches)	25 (1.0)	23 (0.9)	30 (1.2)	38 (1.5)	45 (1.8)	62 (2.4)	70 (2.8)	58 (2.3)	35 (1.4)	39 (1.5)	37 (1.5)	30 (1.2)	492 (19.4)
Average precipitation days	14	12	11	9	11	12	13	13	9	12	14	12	142
Average relative humidity (%)	81	82	75	68	63	68	70	72	74	77	80	82	74
Mean monthly sunshine hours	56	67	118	179	230	237	236	229	171	122	55	40	1,740
Source: Polish Central Statistical Office (closest city on record

== Location ==
Number of inhabitants by year
Year	Number	
1772	1,283	in 228 households (Feuerstellen)
1783	1,853	with the garrison (315 persons belonging to two squadrons of a hussar regiment founded in 1773), mostly Lutherans, 27 Jews
1807	2,113	
1816	1,994	
1826	2,669	
1831	2,585	mostly Germans
1875	5,454	
1880	5,801	
1890	6,122	incl. 2,587 Protestants, 3,048 Catholics and 480 Jews (2,000 Poles)
1905	7,217	incl. 2,702 Protestants and 318 Jews
1931	8,521	approx. 800 Germans
2006	32,588	
2010	27,731	
2014	28,574	
2018	28,874	
2021	28,536	

Brodnica is located in the Kuyavian-Pomeranian Voivodeship on an important route transit over the small river Drwęca, about 48 kilometres (30 miles) south-east of Grudziądz.

== Sports ==
The sports teams in the city include the football club Sparta Brodnica.

== Museum ==
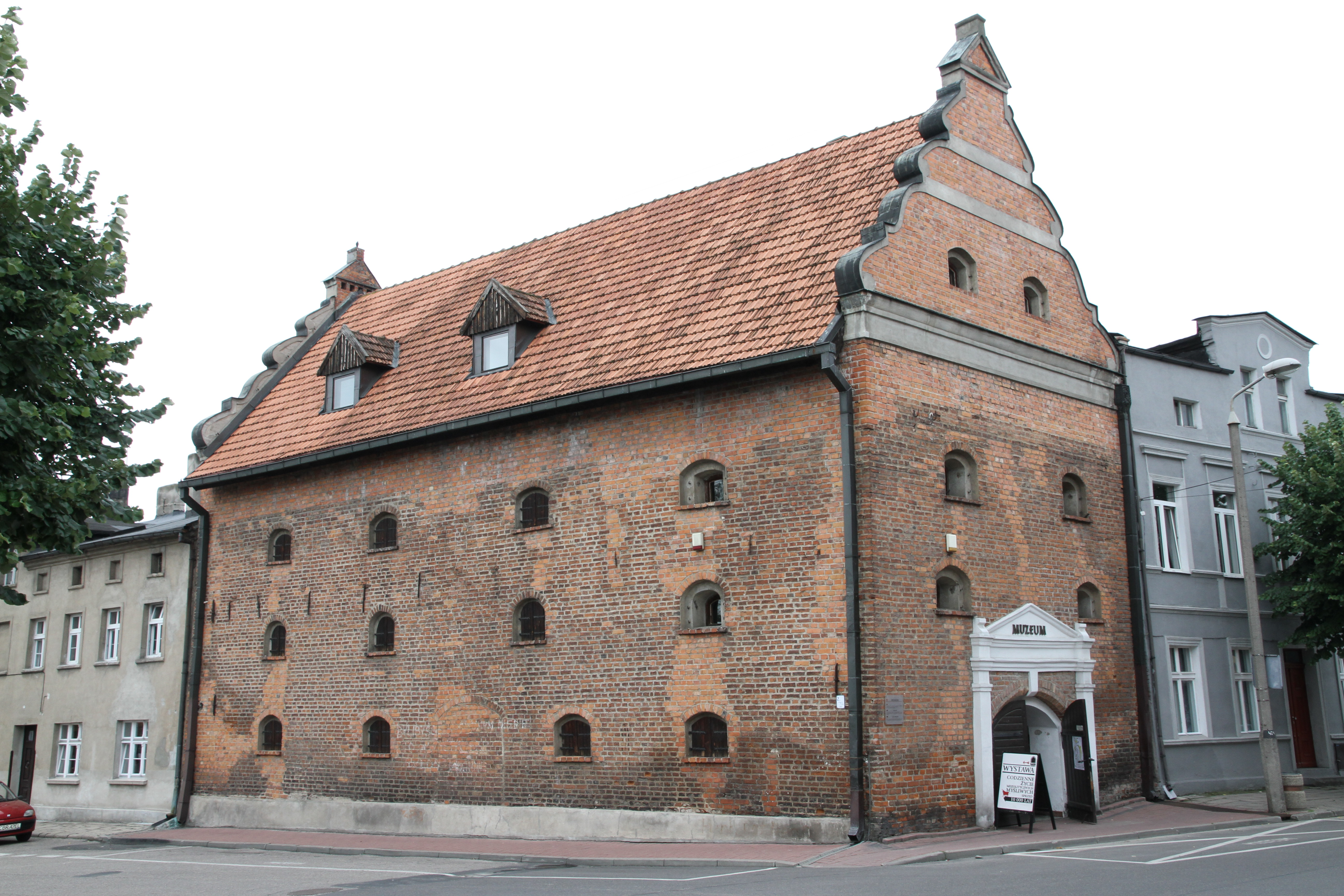
Renaissance granary, main seat of the local museum

The Museum of Brodnica (Muzeum w Brodnicy) consists of three branches, focusing on history, archeology and contemporary art. It is located in the Renaissance granary, the Brodnica Castle tower and the Gothic Chełmińska Gate.

== International relations ==
=== Twin towns – Sister cities ===
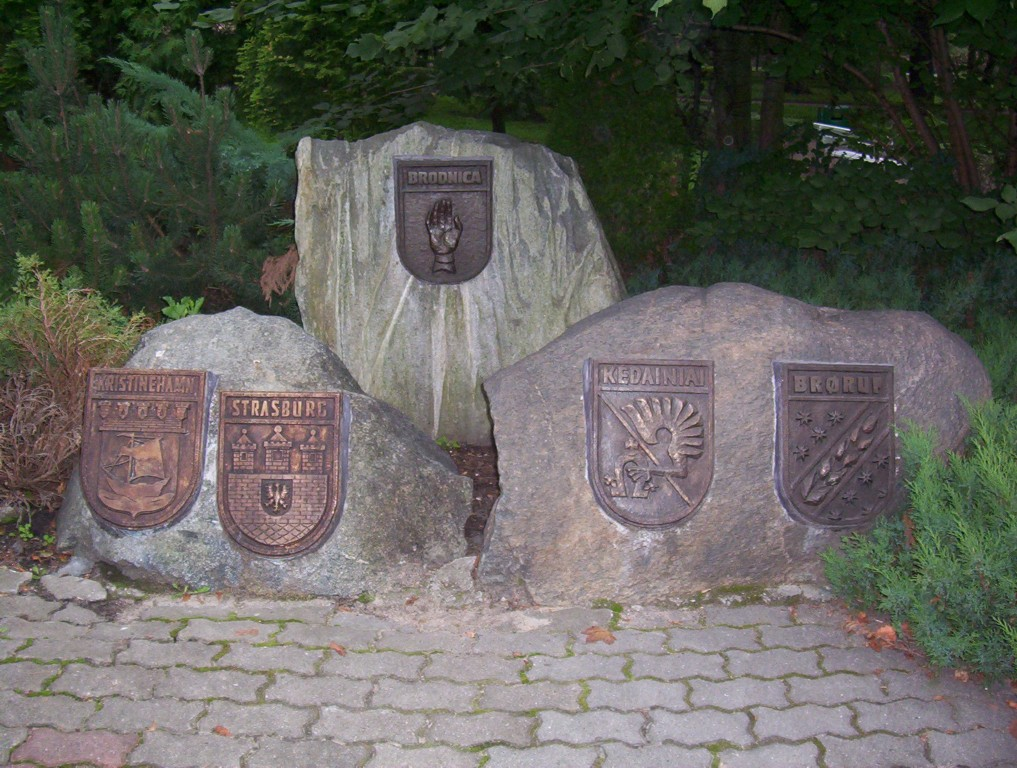
Crests based on partnership towns

Brodnica is twinned with:

- Strasburg, Germany
- Brørup, Denmark
- Kėdainiai, Lithuania
- Kristinehamn, Sweden
- Chamalières, France
- Koprivnica, Croatia
- Hummelo en Keppel, Netherlands
- Sevan, Armenia

== Notable people ==
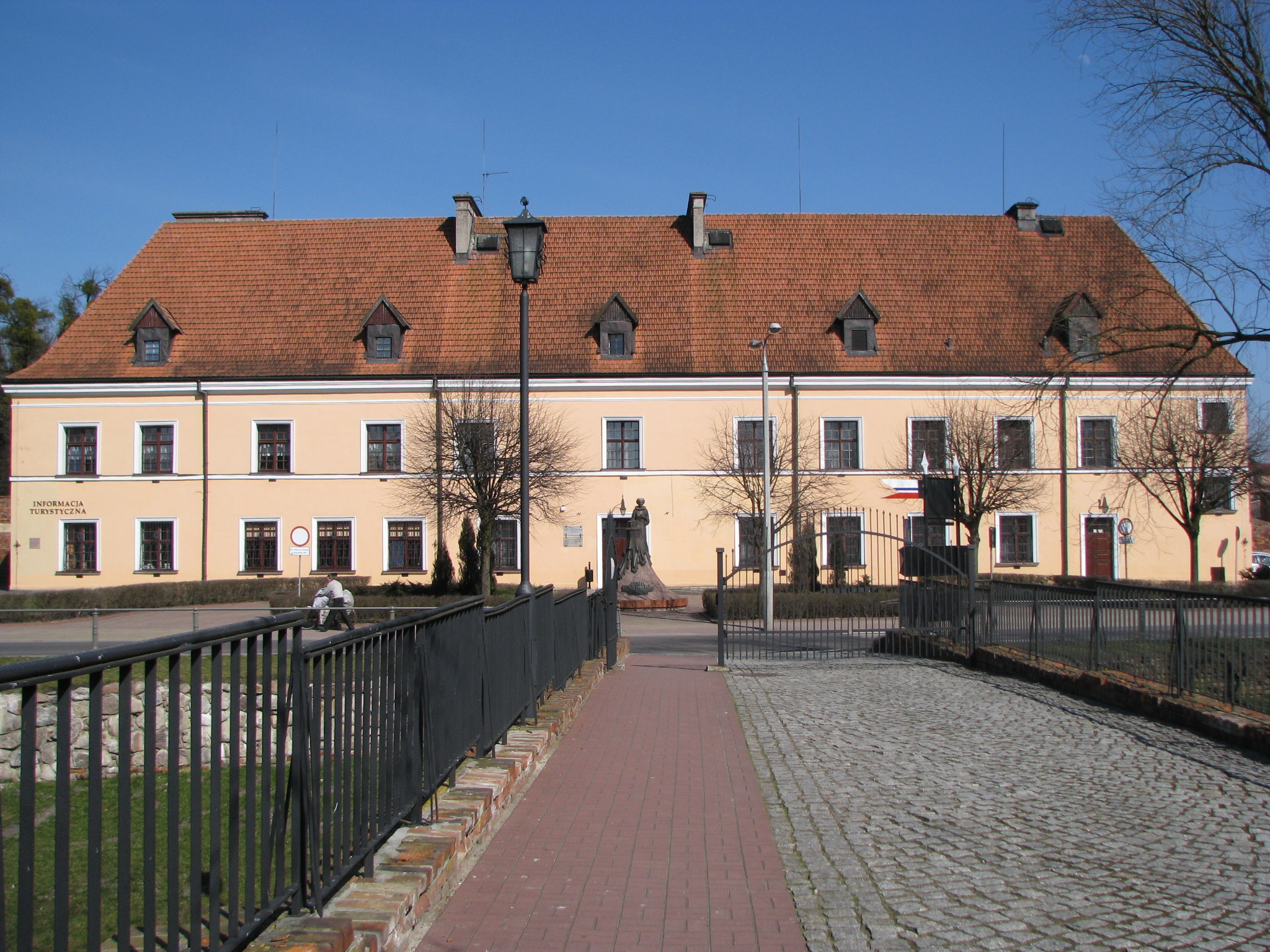
Palace of Anna Vasa

- Martin Truchseß von Wetzhausen – Grand Master of the Teutonic Knights
- Anna Vasa of Sweden – Swedish princess made starosta of Brodnica in 1605 by Sigismund III Vasa
- Robert Garrison – German film actor
- Łukasz Fabiański – Polish footballer
- Jakub Wawrzyniak – Polish footballer
- Robert Kłos – Polish footballer
- Jakub Zabłocki – Polish footballer
- Daniel Trojanowski – Polish rower
- Patryk Kuchczyński – Polish team handball player
- Mateusz Łęgowski – Polish footballer

== Gallery ==
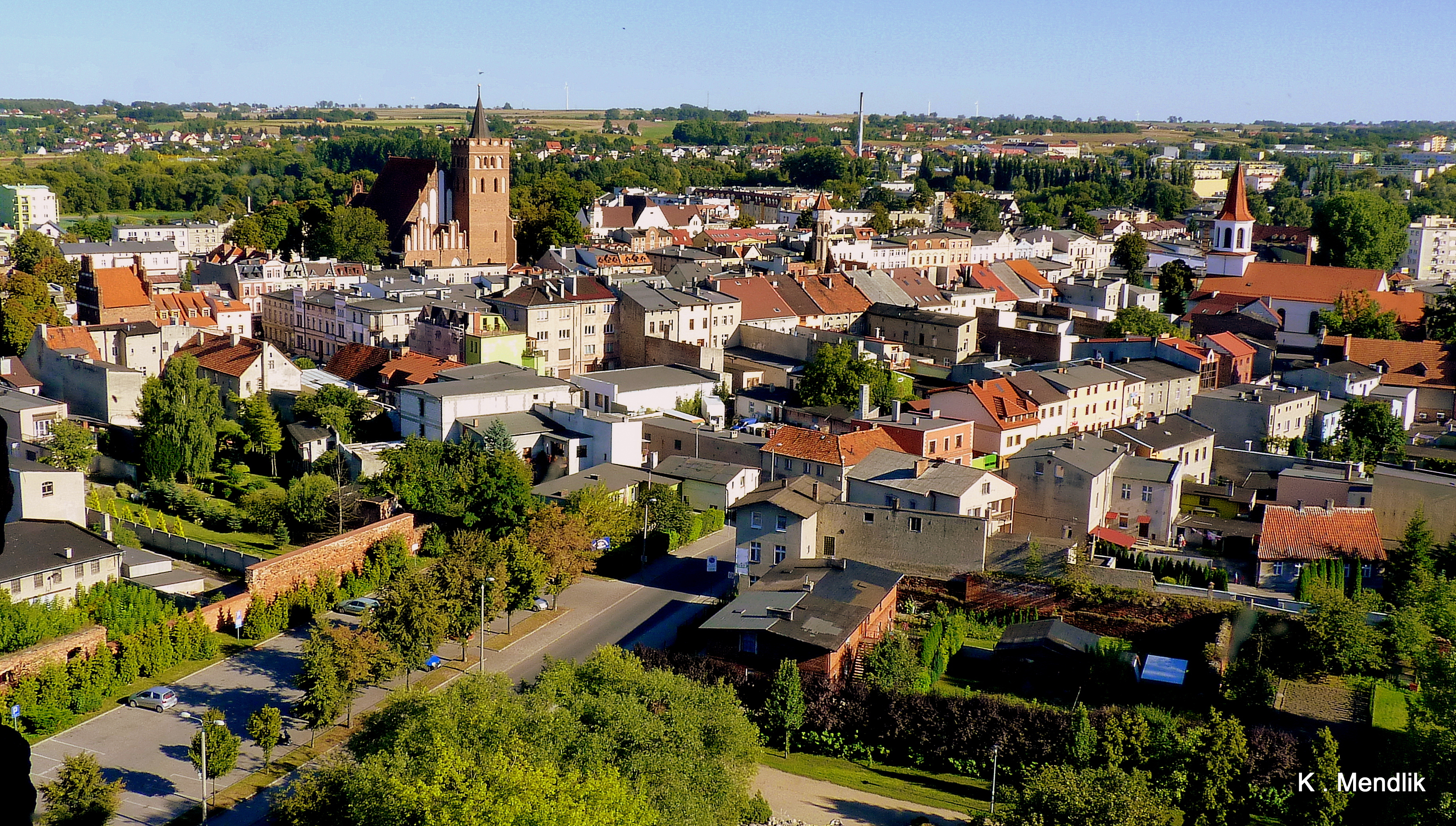
Old Town

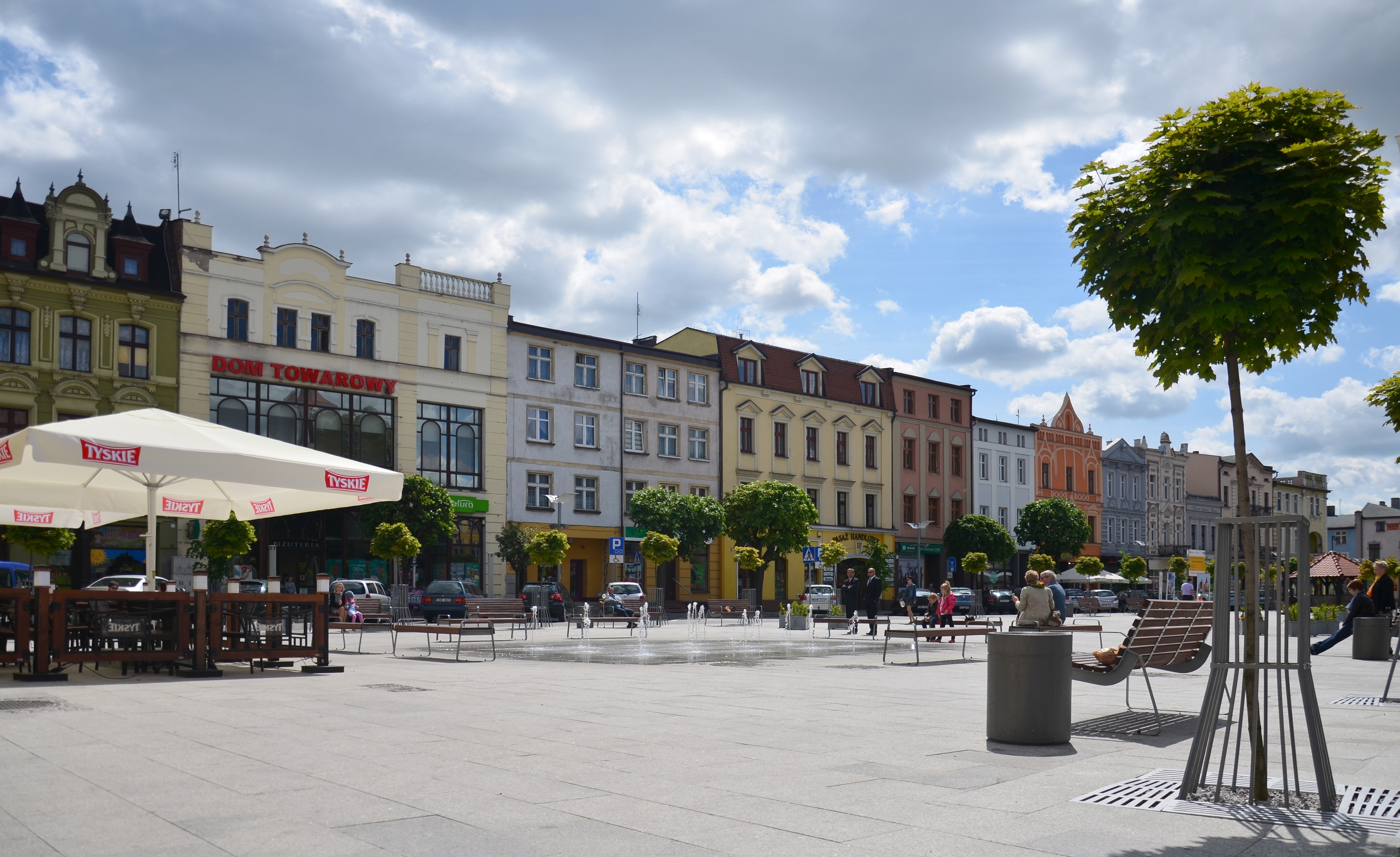
Market Square (Duży Rynek) filled with colourful historic townhouses

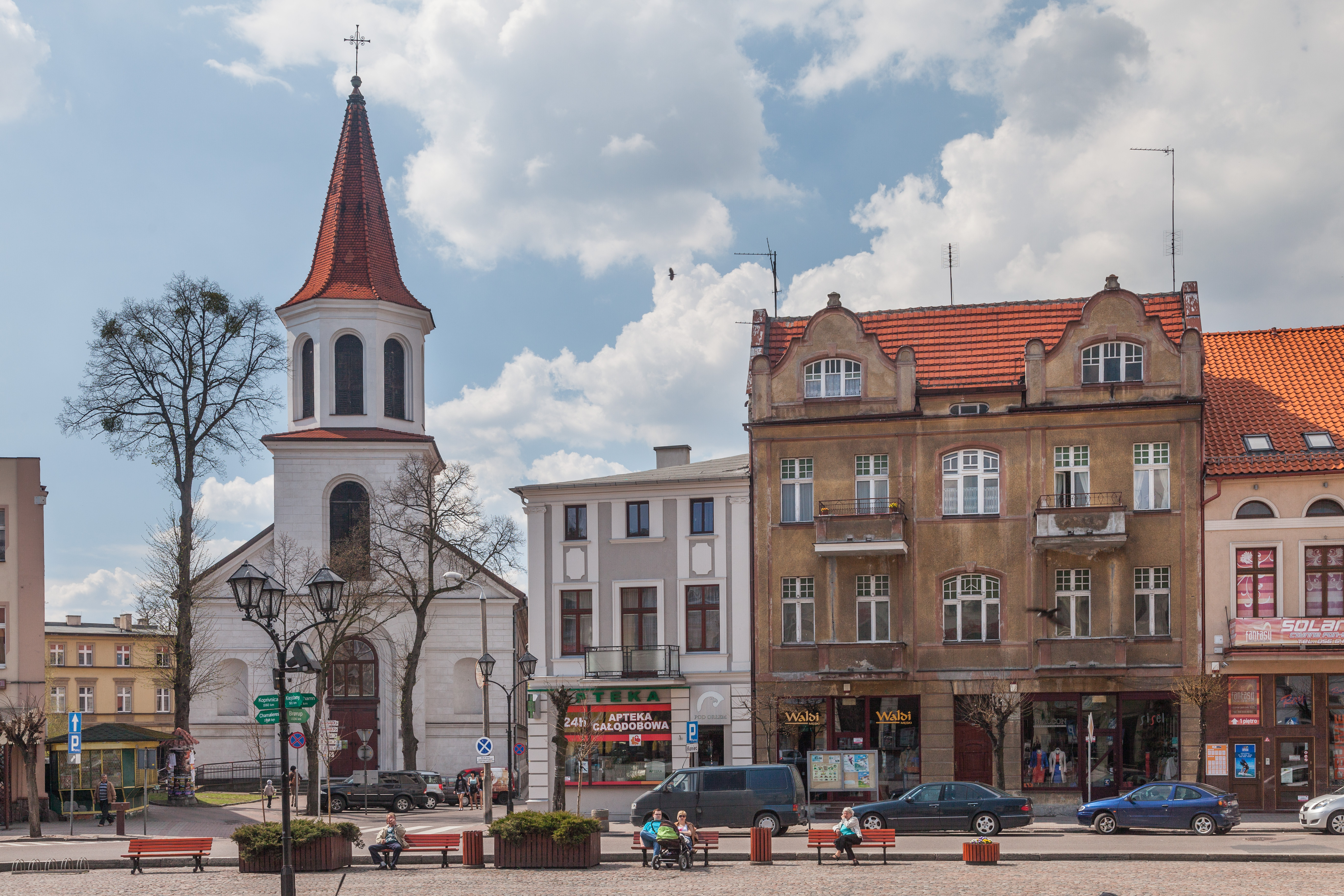
Our Lady Queen of Poland church and historic townhouses

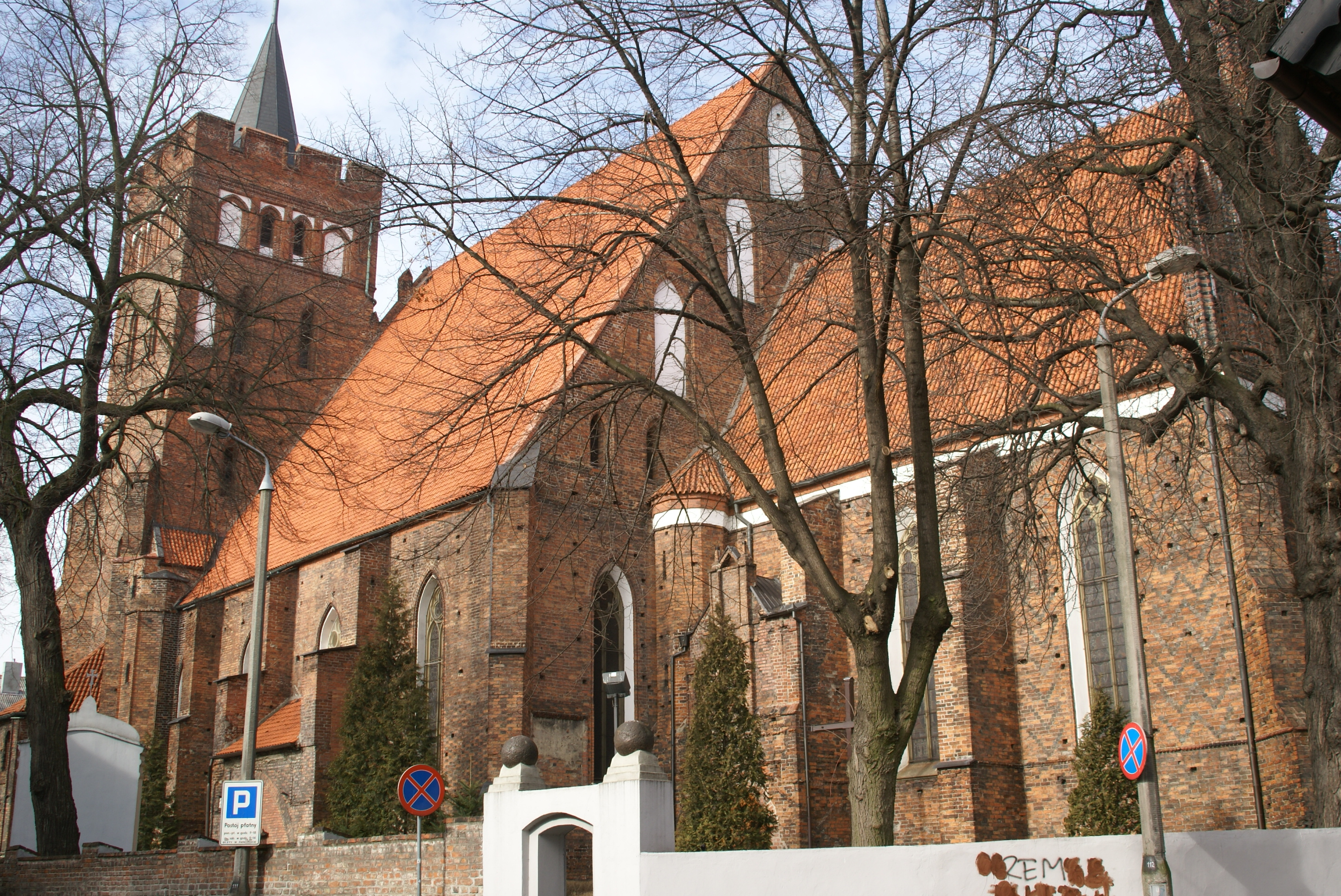
Gothic Church of St. Catherine

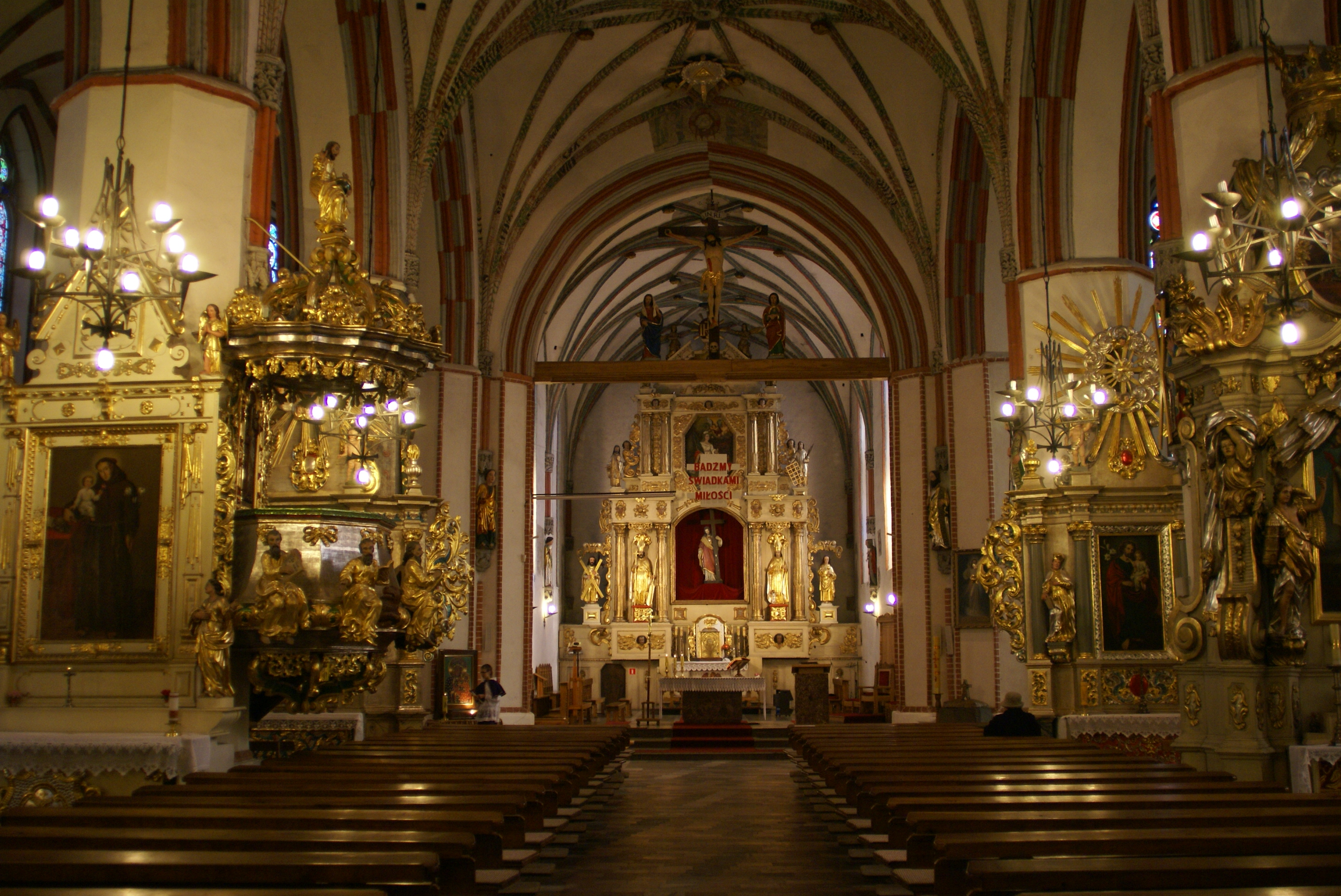
Interior of the Church of St. Catherine

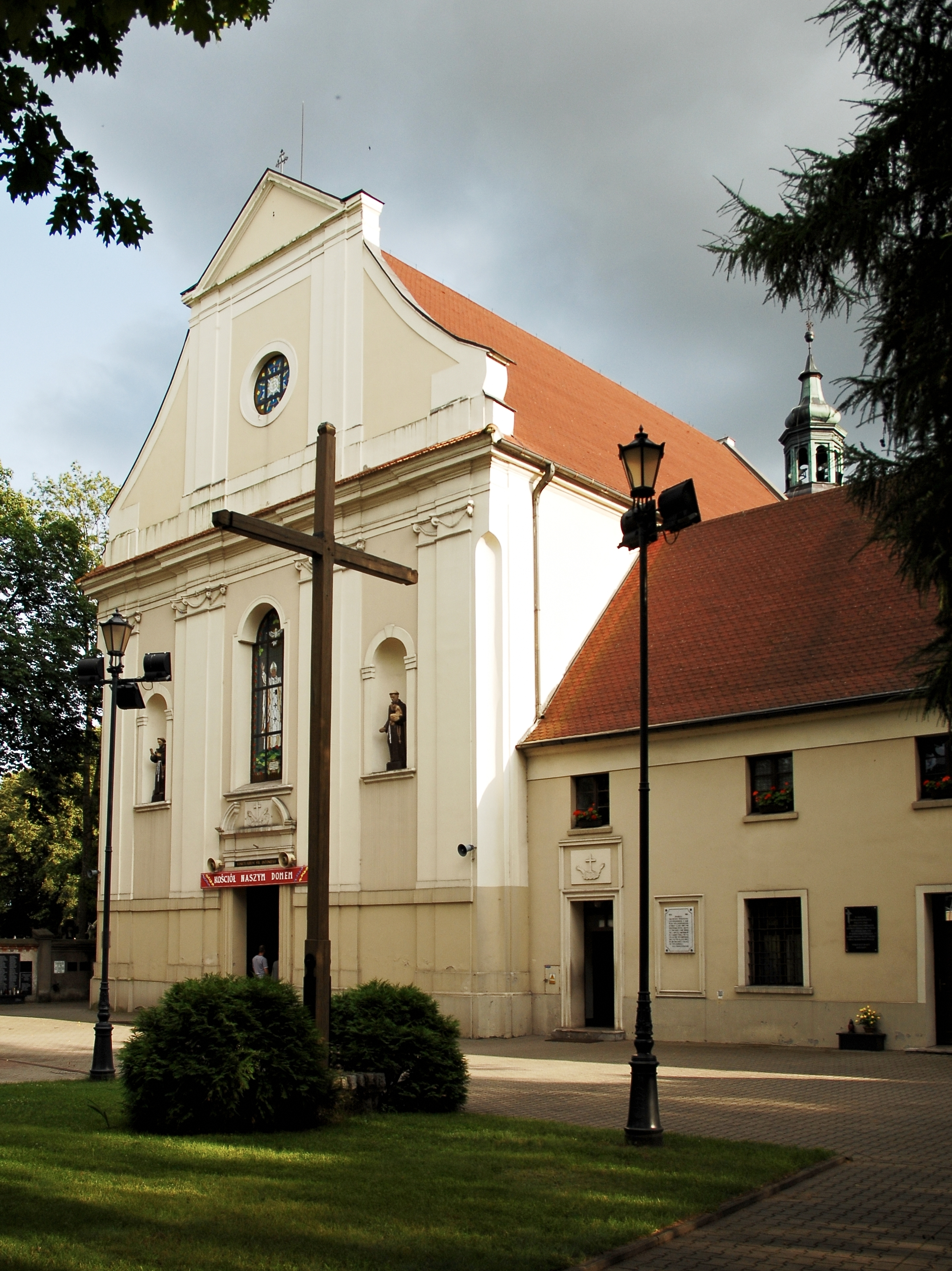
Franciscan Monastery

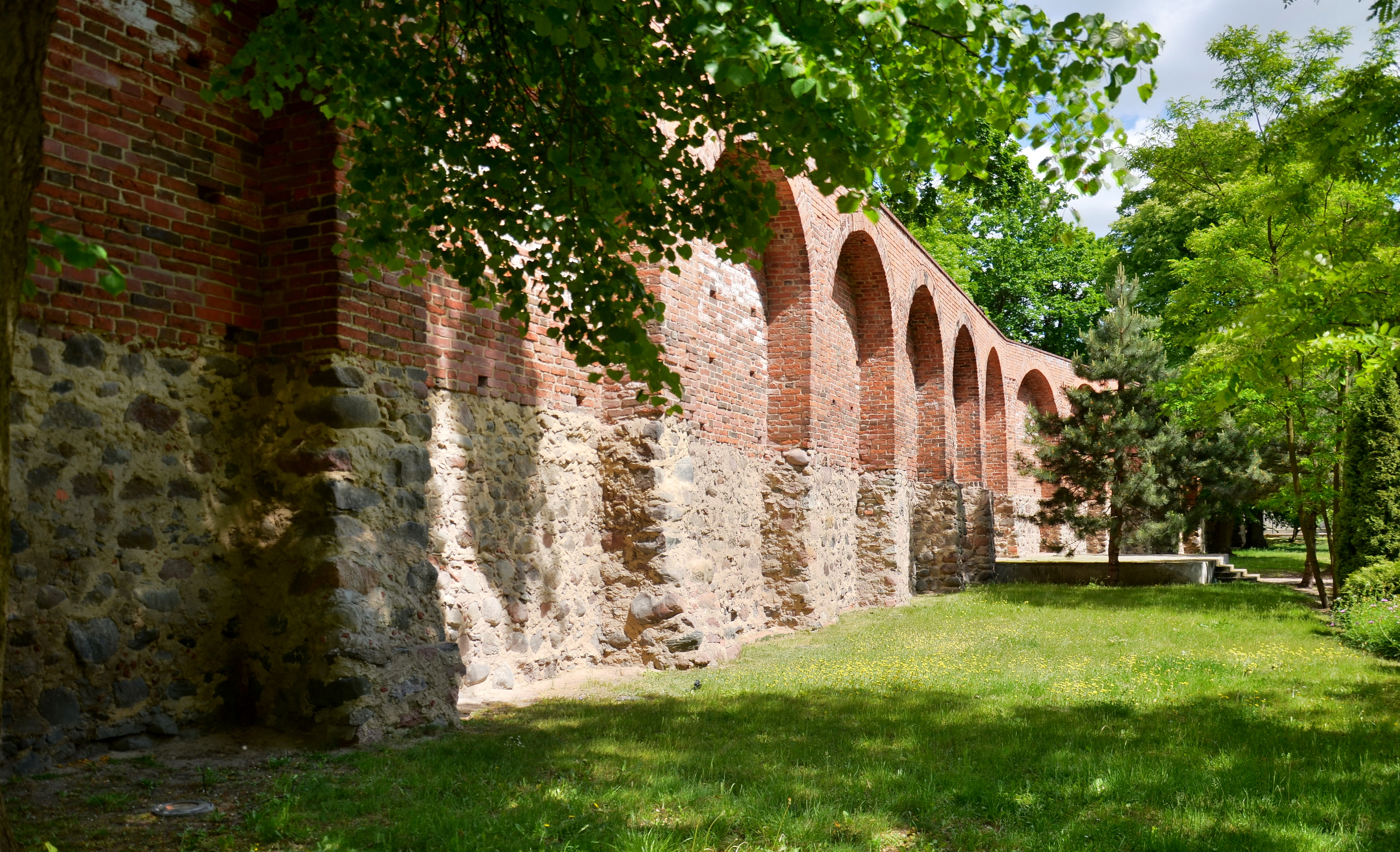
Medieval town walls

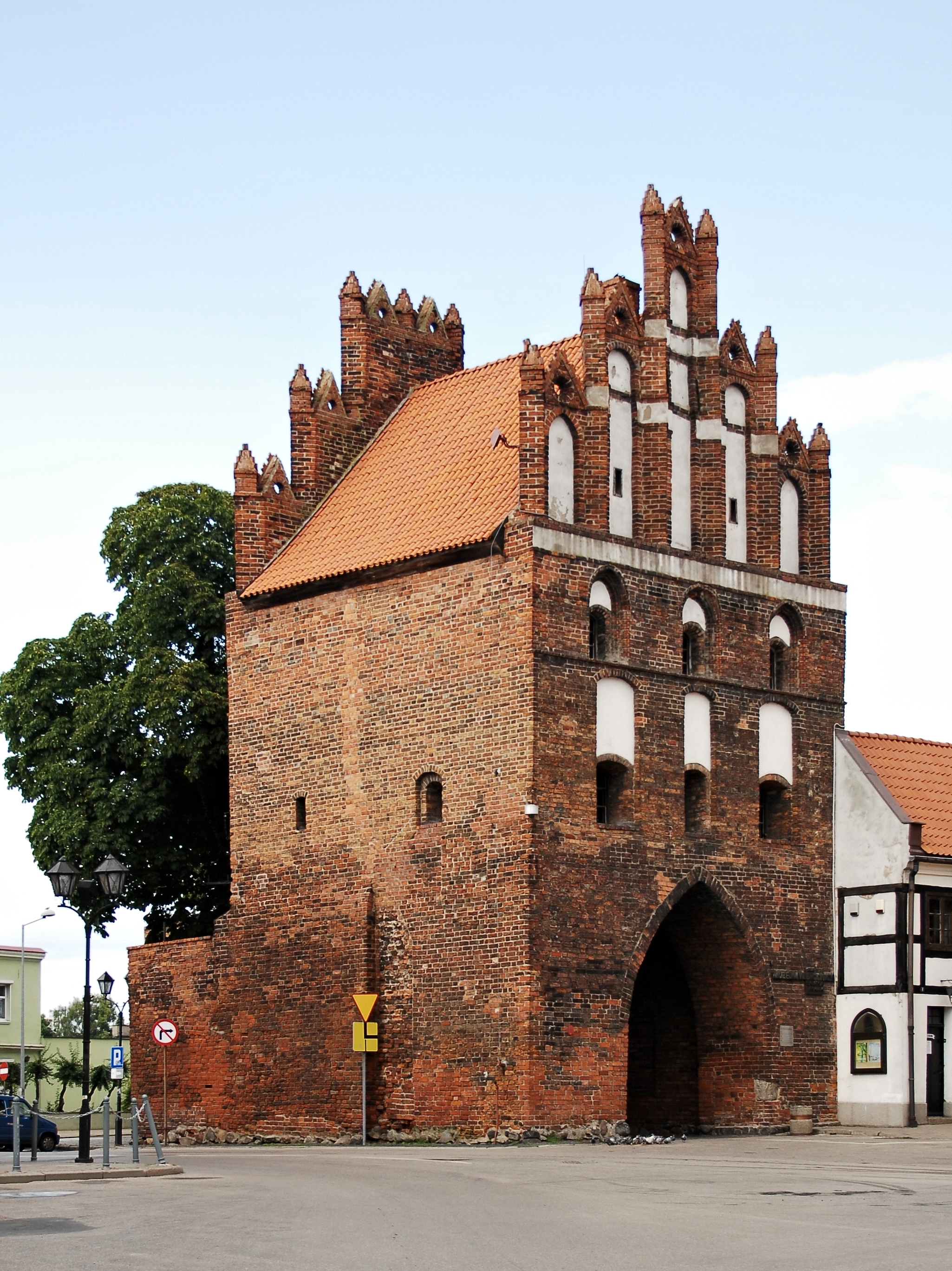
Chełmińska Gate, now a museum

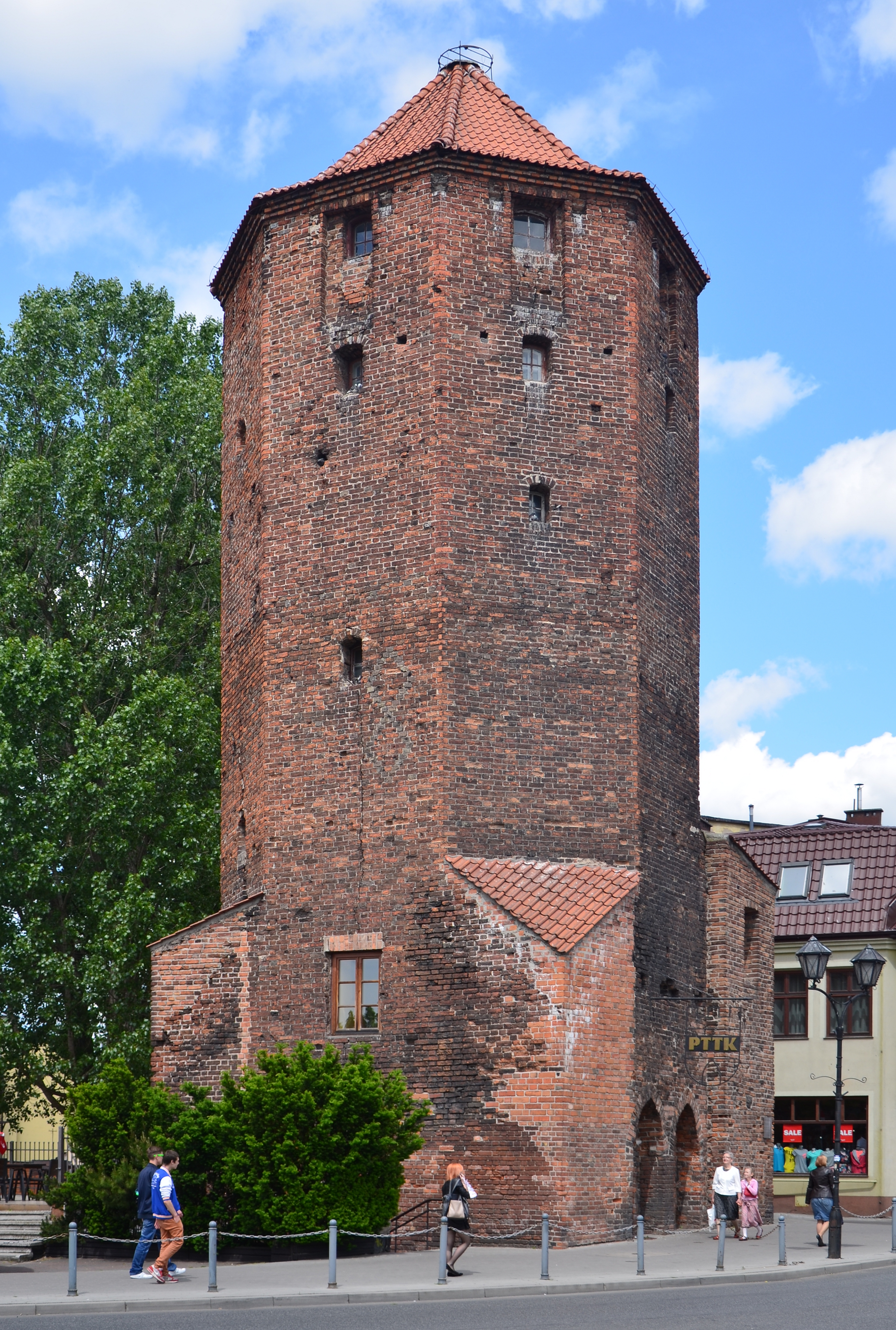
Mazurska Tower

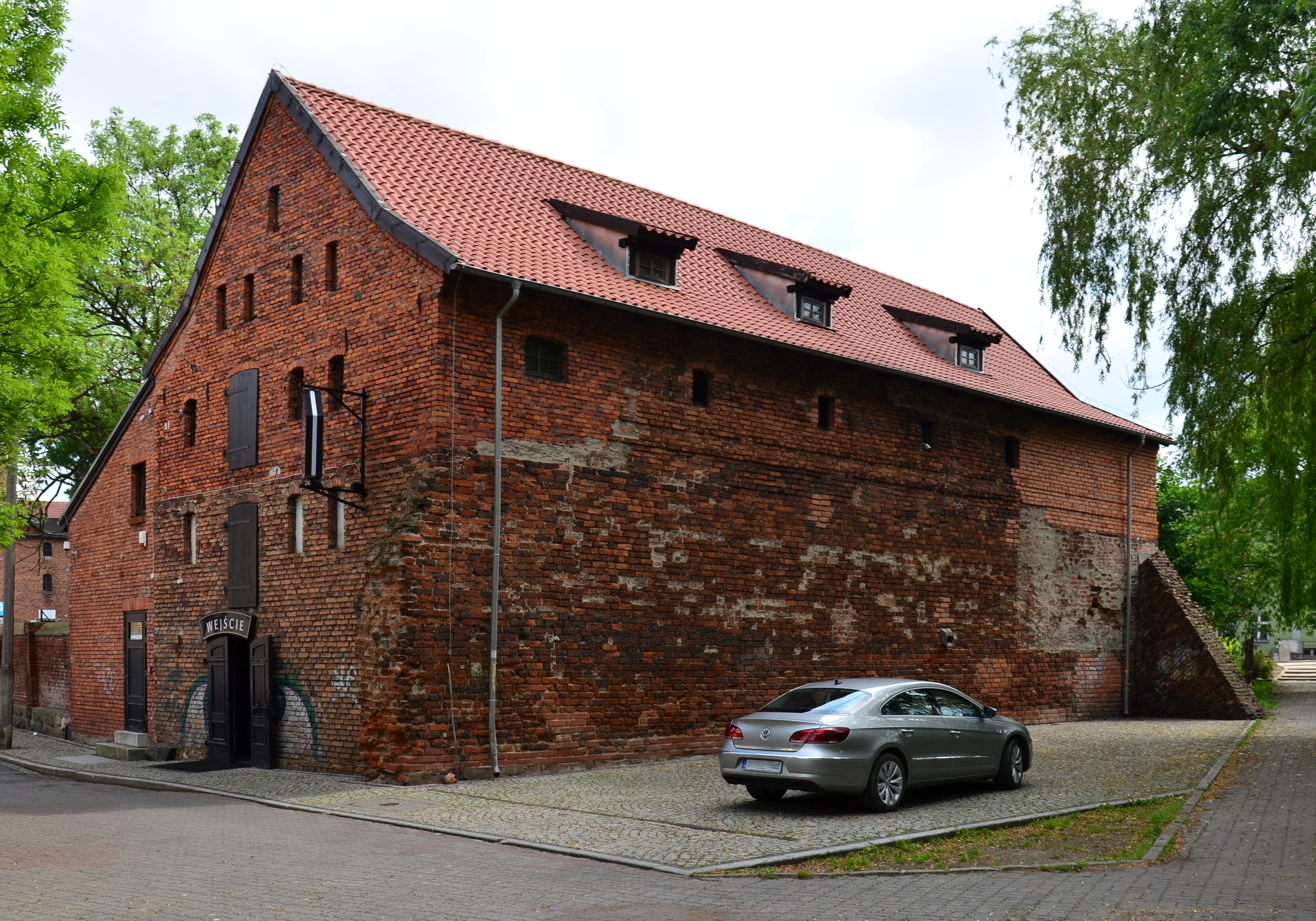
Granary

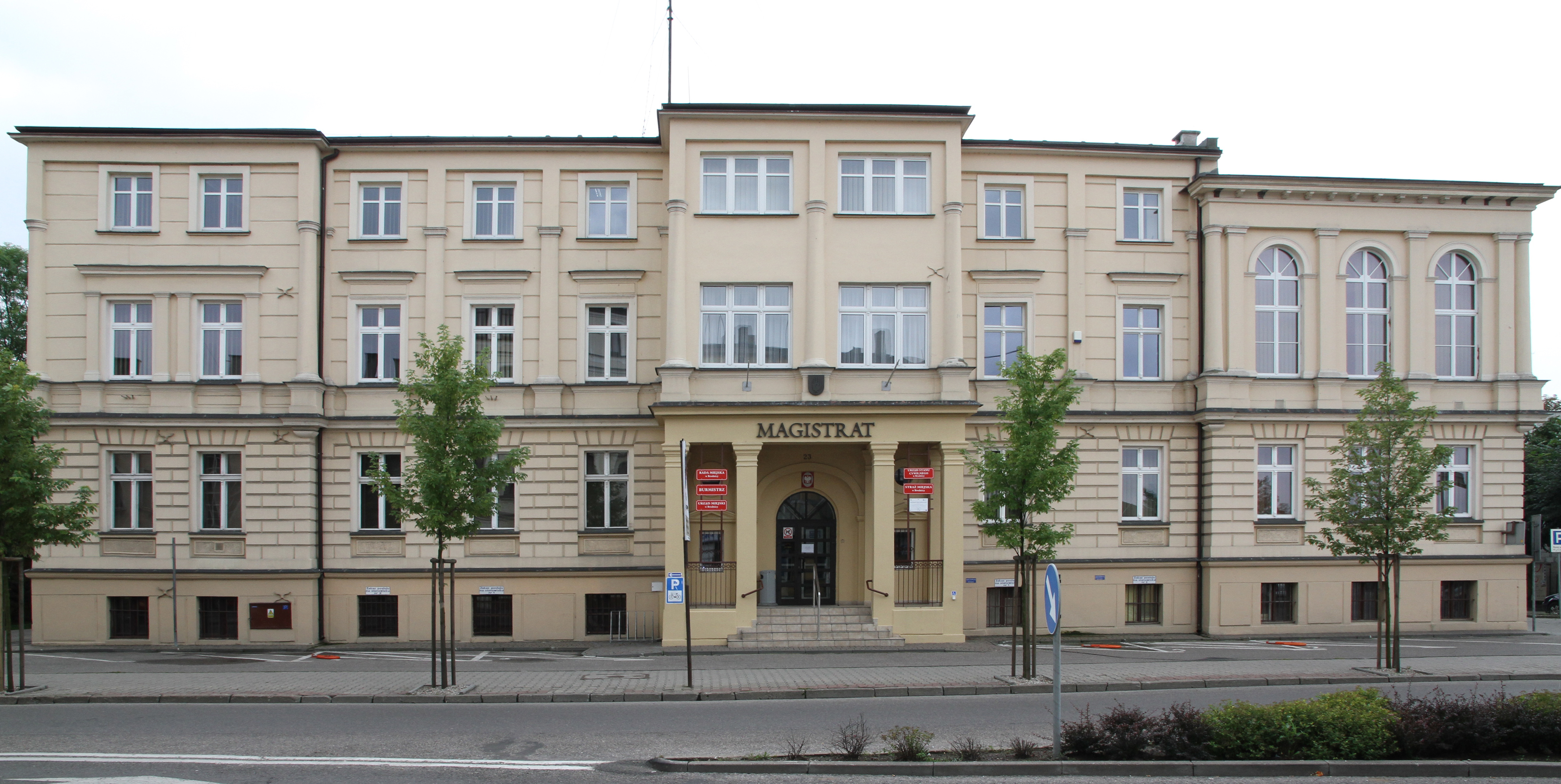
Town Hall

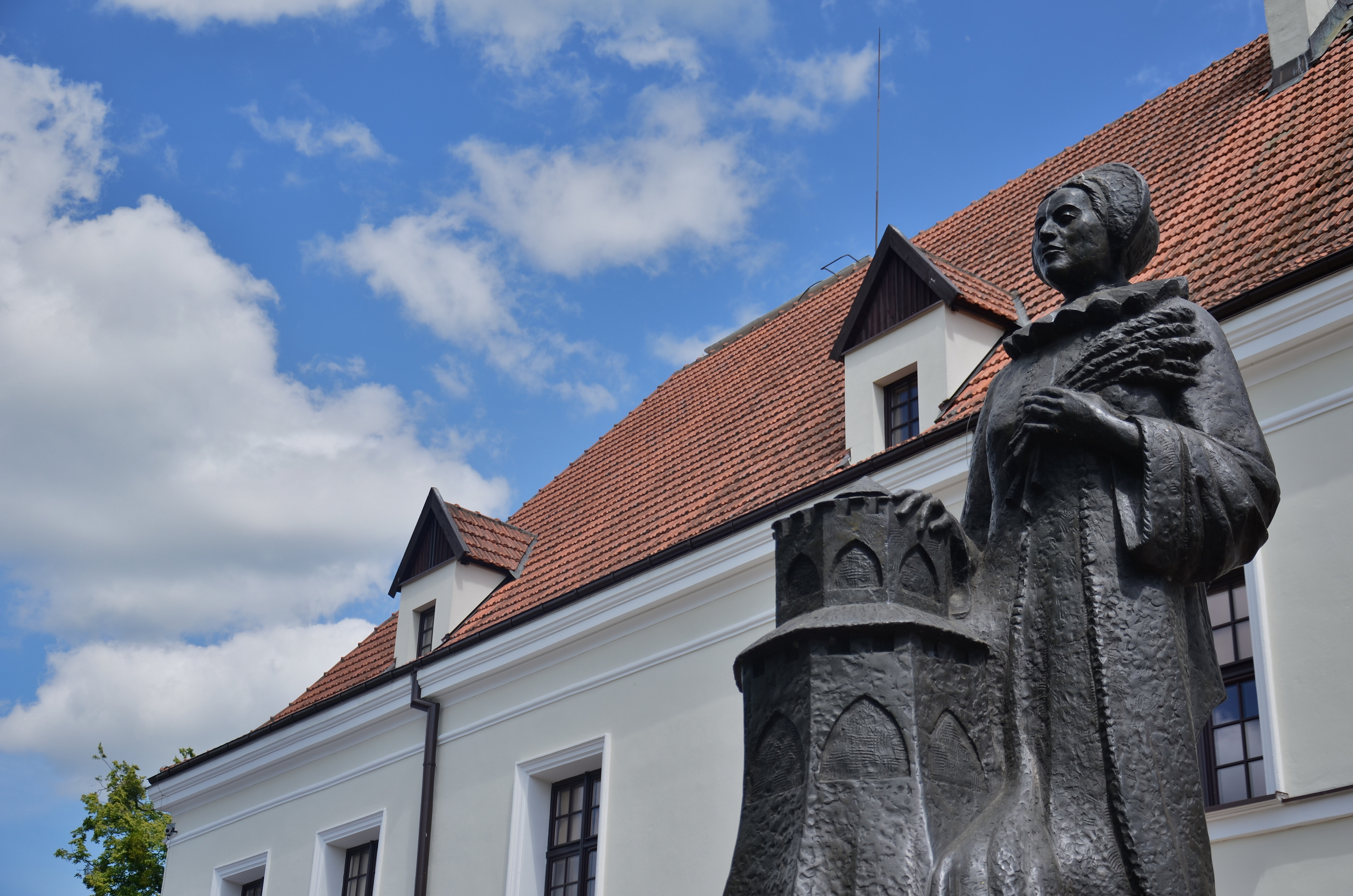
Monument of Anna Vasa

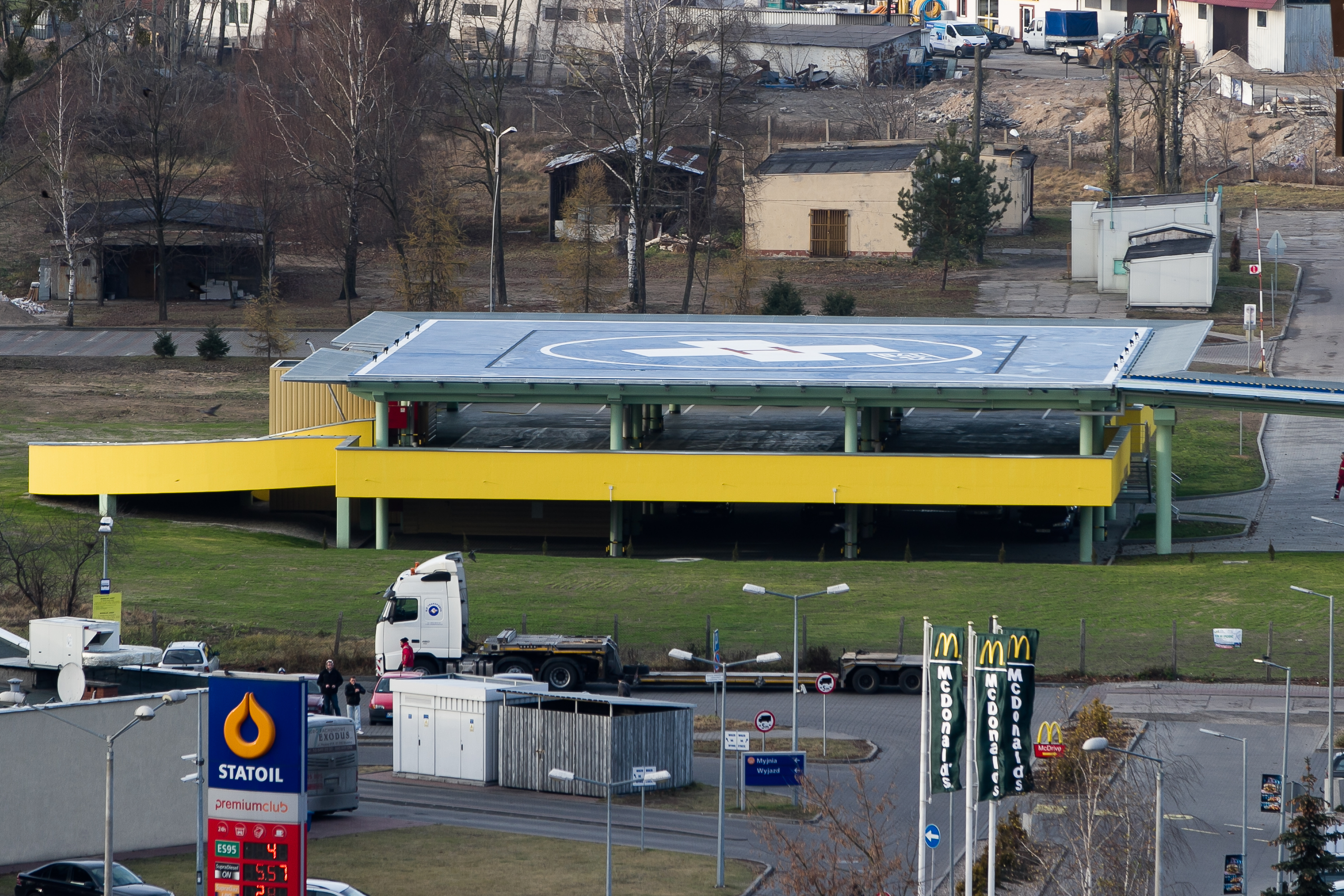
Medical helicopter landing pad

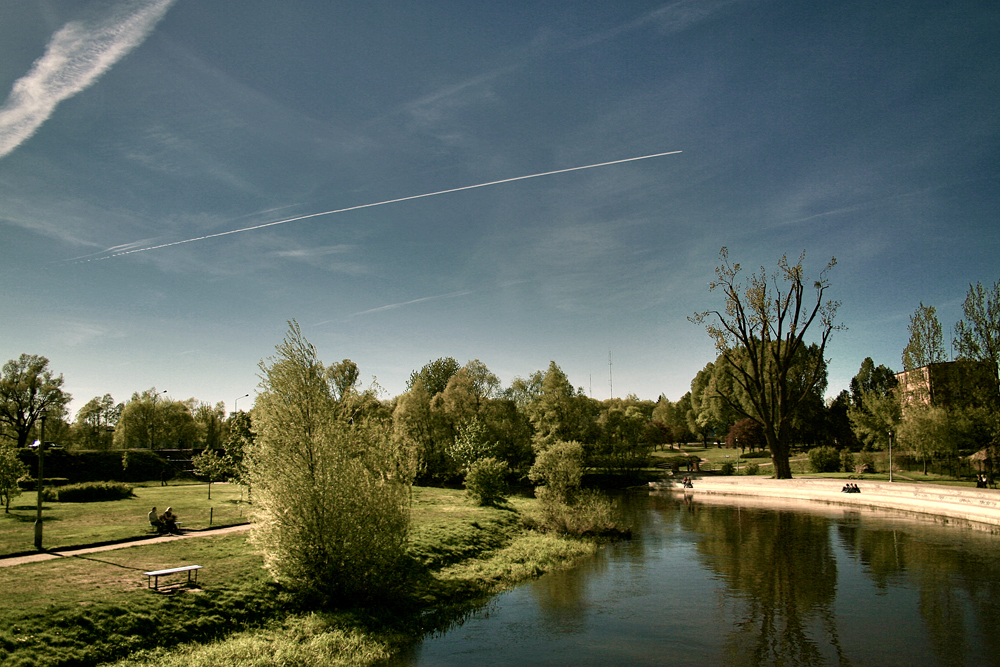
Drwęca river

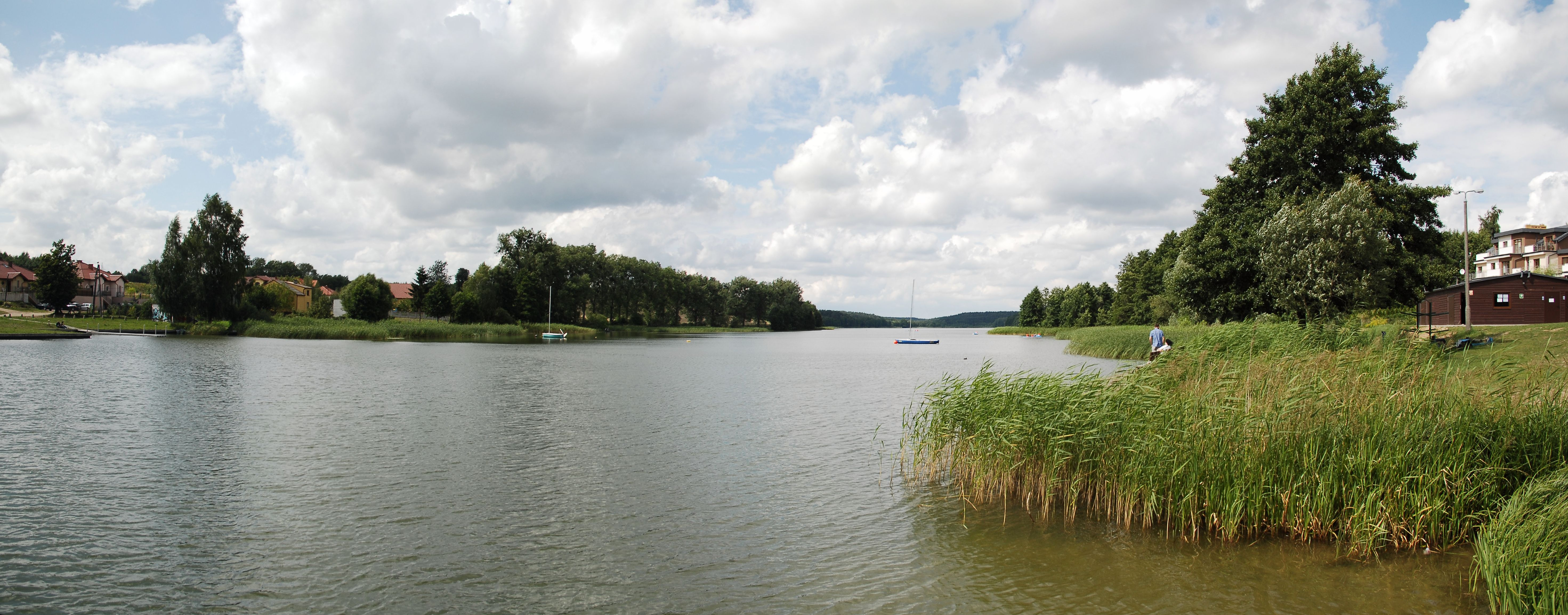
Niskie Brodno lake
