= Centennial Hall (Sopot) =

Basketball arena in Sopot, Poland

Coordinates: 54°26′56.07″N 18°33′42.26″E

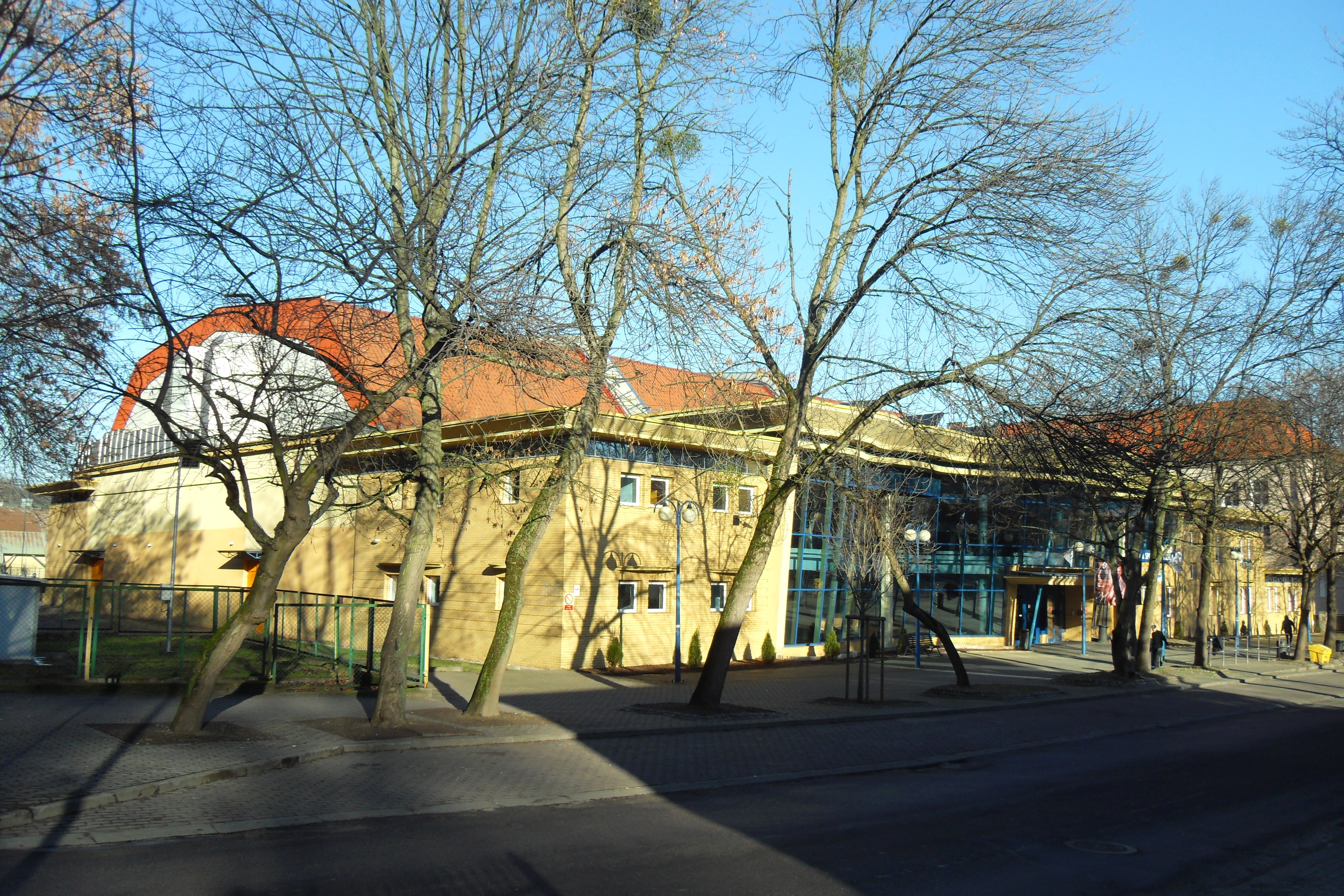
Hala Stulecia Sopotu

Hala Stulecia Sopotu (English: The Centennial Hall of Sopot) is a basketball arena in Sopot, Poland.

The facility was named after Jean Georg Haffner. The main hall of the hall can accommodate a total of 1,942 people, on 1,324 permanent and 618 retractable seats. In addition to the main hall in the hall, there is a conference room, a training room and a fitness center.

In the past, basketball players from Prokom Trefl Sopot played their matches in the Hala Stulecia Sopotu. Prokom was also forced to use this arena for several of its 2007-08 Euroleague regular season home fixtures after its normal home for Euroleague play, Hala Olivia in Gdańsk, was closed due to structural problems.
