= Robert Talarek =

Polish boxer

Personal information
- Nationality: Polish
- Born: 3 June 1983 (age 43) Garwolin, Poland
- Height: 184 cm (6 ft 0 in)
- Weight: Middleweight; Super middleweight

Boxing career
- Stance: Orthodox

Boxing record
- Total fights: 42
- Wins: 25
- Win by KO: 17
- Losses: 14
- Draws: 3

Robert Talarek (born 3 June 1983) is a Polish professional boxer in Middleweight division.

== Boxing career ==
Talarek's professional boxing debut took place on 6 April 2013 in Kalisz where he defeated Rafał Piotrowski by UD in 4th.

On 10 December 2016 Talarek fought Goekalp Oezekler in Germany for vacant IBF East/West Europe Middleweight title, winning by TKO in 7th.

== Private life ==
Throughout his boxing career Talarek has worked as a miner.

== Professional boxing record ==
38 fights	23 wins	12 losses
By knockout	16	1
By decision	7	11
Draws	3	

No.	Result	Record	Opponent	Type	Round, time	Date	Location	Notes
42	Win	25-14-2	(Georgia (country)) George Aduashvili	TKO	2 (6)	05 Nov, 2021	Hala MOSiR, Ruda Śląska, Poland	
41	Loss	24-14-2	(Poland) Łukasz Stanioch	UD	10	14 May 2021	Transcolor, Szeligi, Poland	
40	Draw	24-13-3	(Ukraine) Aleksandr Strecki	SD	8	30 Nov 2019	Sports Center, Raszyn, Poland	
39	Win	24-13-2	(Poland) Patryk Szymański	TKO	5 (8), 1:45	06 Apr 2019	Spodek, Katowice, Poland	
38	Win	23-13-2	(Poland) Tomasz Gargula	TKO	2 (4), 2:56	01 Dec 2018	Academy of physical education, Katowice, Poland	
37	Win	22-13-2	(United States) John Rene	TKO	1 (8), 2:47	27 Oct 2018	Wieliczka Salt Mine, Wieliczka, Poland	
36	Win	21-13-2	(Poland) Artem Karpets	UD	8	19 Aug 2018	Amfiteatr, Miedzyzdroje, Poland	
35	Loss	20-13-2	(Poland) Norbert Dąbrowski	UD	8	25 May 2018	Stadion Narodowy, Warsaw, Poland	
34	Win	20-12-2	(France) Frank Haroche	TKO	8 (12)	03 Nov 2017	Palais des sports, Cahors, France	For vacant IBO Inter-Continental Middleweight Title
33	Win	19-12-2	(Cuba) Ericles Torres Marin	TKO	3 (10), 2:32	01 Oct 2017	MOSiR Hall, Katowice, Poland	
32	Win	18-12-2	(Poland) Norbert Dąbrowski	UD	8	24 Jun 2017	Ergo Arena, Gdańsk, Poland	
31	Win	17-12-2	(Turkey) Goekalp Oezekler	TKO	7 (12), 2:20	10 Dec 2016	Rattenfänger-Halle, Hamelin, Germany	Won vacant IBF East/West Europe middleweight title
30	Win	16-12-2	(Netherlands) Josemir Poulino	TKO	3 (8)	17 Oct 2016	Theater Carré, Amsterdam, Netherlands	
29	Win	15-12-2	(Poland) Sebastian Skrzypczynski	TKO	2 (6), 2:16	24 Sep 2016	Sport Hall, Kalisz, Poland	
28	Win	14-12-2	(Nigeria) King Davidson	MD	8	2 Jul 2016	Loewensaal, Nuremberg, Germany	
27	Loss	13-12-2	(United Kingdom) John Ryder	PTS	6	28 May 2016	SSE Hydro, Glasgow, Scotland, United Kingdom	
26	Win	13-11-2	(Spain) Guzman Castillo	TKO	3 (6)	21 May 2016	Club Entrena en Barcelona, Barcelona, Spain	
25	Win	12-11-2	(Slovakia) Simon Elischer	TKO	2 (4), 1:51	11 Mar 2016	Restaurant, Ruda Śląska, Poland	
24	Win	11-11-2	(Uganda) Hassan Saku	RTD	3 (4), 3:00	28 Nov 2015	Rocklunda, Västerås, Sweden	
23	Loss	10-11-2	(Hungary) Balazs Kelemen	UD	6	22 May 2015	Messzi István Sporthall, Kecskemét, Hungary	
22	Loss	10-10-2	(Poland) Norbert Dąbrowski	MD	8	21 Mar 2015	OSiR Hall, Brodnica, Poland	
21	Loss	10-9-2	(United Kingdom) Liam Smith	TKO	8 (10), 2:01	6 Mar 2015	Echo Arena, Liverpool, Merseyside, United Kingdom	
20	Win	10-8-2	(Hungary) Attila Benkovics	TKO	1 (4), 1:11	15 Feb 2015	Community Hall, Kistarcsa, Hungary	
19	Win	9-8-2	(France) Jonathan Bertonnier	PTS	6	24 Jan 2015	Salle Barra, Niort, Deux-Sèvres, France	
18	Loss	8-8-2	(Finland) Niklas Rasanen	UD	8	15 Nov 2014	Steveco-Areena, Kotka, Finland	
17	Win	8-7-2	(Belarus) Pavel Staravoitau	UD	8	19 Sep 2014	MOSiR Hall, Radom, Poland	
16	Loss	7-7-2	(United Kingdom) Conrad Cummings	PTS	6	6 Sep 2014	Titanic Quarter, Belfast, United Kingdom	
15	Win	7-6-2	(Germany) Arthur Hermann	PTS	8	18 Jul 2014	Camden Centre, London, United Kingdom	
14	Loss	6-6-2	(Poland) Marek Matyja	UD	6	28 Jun 2014	Hala na Podpromiu, Rzeszów, Poland	
13	Loss	6-5-2	(Switzerland) Mischa Nigg	UD	6	09 Jun 2014	Seminar Hotel Lueg, Burgdorf, Switzerland	
12	Win	6-4-2	(Czech Republic) Dušan Makula	RTD	1 (4)	24 May 2014	Restaurace U Trumpetky, Louny, Czech Republic	
11	Win	5-4-2	(Poland) Michal Szebestik	UD	4	16 May 2014	Sport Hall, Ślesin, Poland	
10	Win	4-4-2	(Poland) Rafal Piotrowski	PTS	4	10 May 2014	Pneumant Arena, Fürstenwalde, Germany	
9	Loss	3-4-2	(France) Maurice Possiti	PTS	6	26 Apr 2014	Salle Marcel Cerdan, Joué-lès-Tours, France	
8	Win	3-3-2	(Belarus) Dzianis Makar	TKO	3 (4), 2:35	05 Apr 2014	Adria, Ruda Śląska, Poland	
7	Draw	2-3-2	(Moldova) Denis Krieger	MD	4	20 Dec 2013	Messe, Schnelsen, Hamburg, Germany	
6	Loss	2-3-1	(Belgium) Michel Garcia	UD	6	23 Nov 2013	Parc des Sports, Charleroi, Belgium	
5	Win	2-2-1	(Italy) Omid Zohrabi	TKO	2 (4)	08 Nov 2013	Kalmar Sporthall, Kalmar, Sweden	
4	Loss	1-2-1	(Finland) Sakari Lahderinne	PTS	4	26 Oct 2013	Hotell Kimmel, Joensuu, Finland	
3	Loss	1-1-1	(Poland) Kamil Szeremeta	MD	4	18 May 2013	Arena Hall, Legionowo, Poland	
2	Draw	1-0-1	(France) Yohan Fauveau	PTS	4	20 Apr 2013	Gymnase Georges Racine, Hauts-de-Seine, France	
1	Win	1-0	(Poland) Rafal Piotrowski	UD	4	06 Apr 2013	OSiR, Kalisz, Poland	
