= Inowrocław Voivodeship =

Former administrative division of the Kingdom of Poland

Coordinates: 52°47′44″N 18°15′37″E

Inowrocław Voivodeship Województwo inowrocławskie (Polish) Palatinatus Iuniuladislaviensis (Latin)
- Voivodeship of Poland
- 1364–1772
- Coat of arms

- Inowrocław Voivodeship in the Polish–Lithuanian Commonwealth in 1635.
- Capital: Inowrocław
- Area
- 5,877 km^{2} (2,269 sq mi)
- History
  - Established: 1364
  - Annexed by Prussia: 25 September 1772
- Political subdivisions: Two counties of Inowrocław Voivodeship proper, plus three counties of Dobrzyń Land
Preceded by	Succeeded by
Duchy of Kuyavia; Duchy of Inowrocław	Netze District
- Today part of: Poland

Inowrocław Voivodeship (Polish: województwo inowrocławskie) was a unit of administrative division and local government in Poland from the 14th century to the First Partition of Poland in 1772. Together with the neighbouring Brześć Kujawski Voivodeship it was part of the Kuyavia region and the Greater Poland Province.

With size of some 2,900 km^{2} (together with Dobrzyn Land, its area was 5,877 km^{2}.), it was one of the smallest voivodeships of the Polish–Lithuanian Commonwealth. In early years after its creation (14th century), it was called Gniewkowo Voivodeship (Województwo gniewkowskie), from the town of Gniewkowo, the seat of local Piast princes. Last mention of Gniewkowo Voivodeship was in 1420. Even though the capital of the voivodeship was in Inowrocław, its biggest urban center was Bydgoszcz. Local sejmiks, together with Brzesc Kujawski Voivodeship, took place in Radziejów. The Inowrocław Voivodeship with Dobrzyn Land had six senators (Voivode and Castellan of Inowrocław, Castellan of Bydgoszcz, and Castellans of Dobrzyń, Rypin and Słońsk Dolny).

Apart from the original two Kuyavian counties of the Voivodeship, it also included the Dobrzyn Land, located on eastern bank of the Vistula which became part of the Kingdom of Poland in 1466. The Dobrzyn Land was divided into three counties (Dobrzyń, Rypin, Lipno), and had its own sejmiks at Lipno.

== Administration ==
Governor seat:

- Inowrocław

Voivodes: Hieronim Radomicki (1630–1651)

Regional council (sejmik) seats:

- Radziejow
- Lipno

Administrative division:

- County of Inowrocław
- County of Bydgoszcz
- Land of Dobrzyń (ziemia dobrzyńska), divided into the counties of Dobrzyń, Rypin, and Lipno.

Neighbouring Voivodeships:

- Pomeranian Voivodeship
- Chełmno Voivodeship
- Płock Voivodeship
- Brześć Kujawski Voivodeship
- Kalisz Voivodeship
- Gniezno Voivodeship (since 1768)

== Cities and towns ==
=== Bydgoszcz County ===
- Bydgoszcz
- Fordon
- Koronowo
- Solec

=== Dobrzyń County ===
- Dobrzyń nad Wisłą

=== Inowrocław County ===
- Gniewkowo
- Inowrocław
- Pakość
- Podgórz
- Raciążek
- Służewo

=== Lipno County ===
- Bobrowniki
- Kikół
- Lipno
- Skępe

=== Rypin County ===
- Dobrzyń nad Drwęcą
- Górzno
- Rypin
