= Kuyavia =

Kuyavia Kujawy
- Historical region
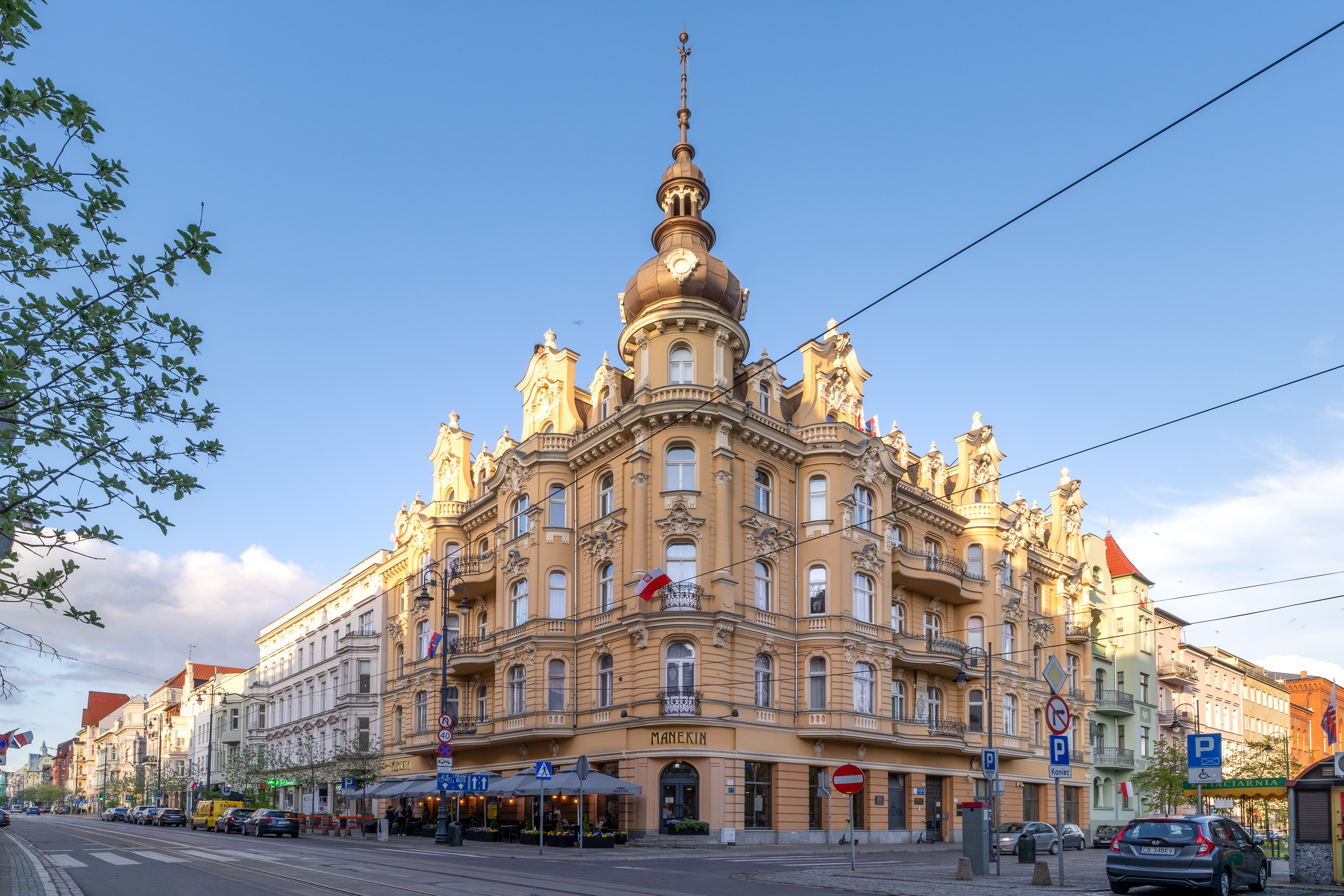
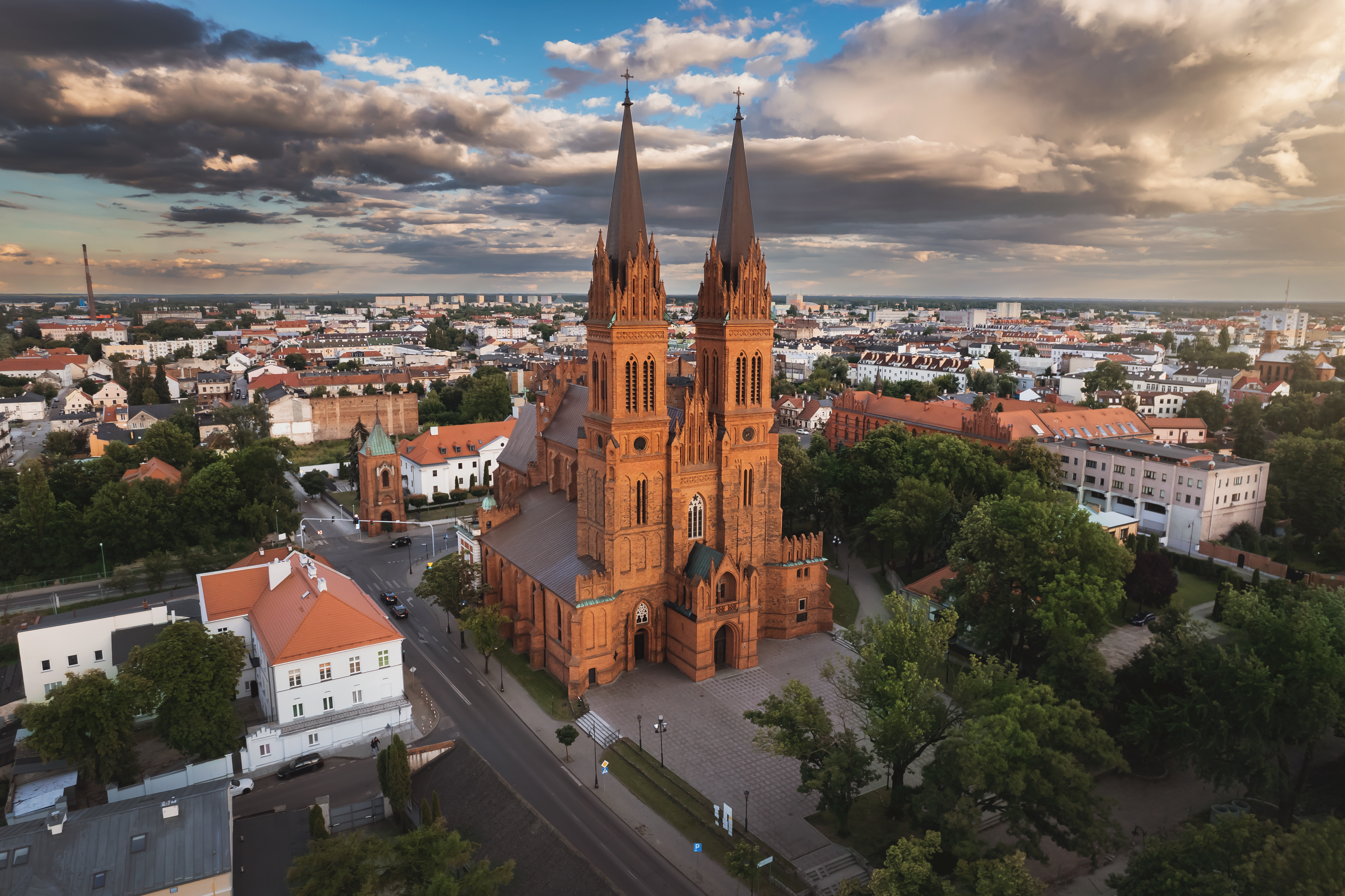
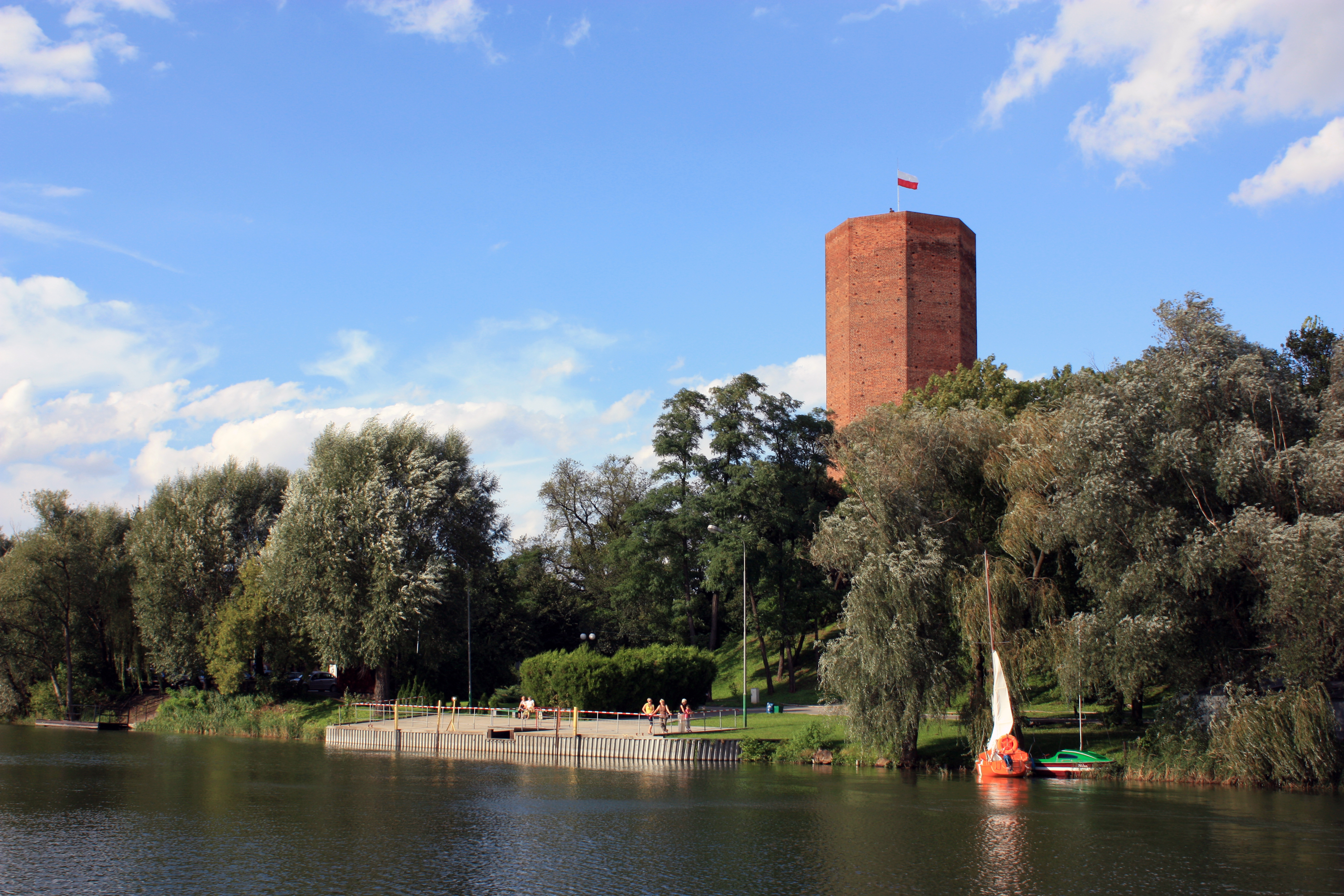
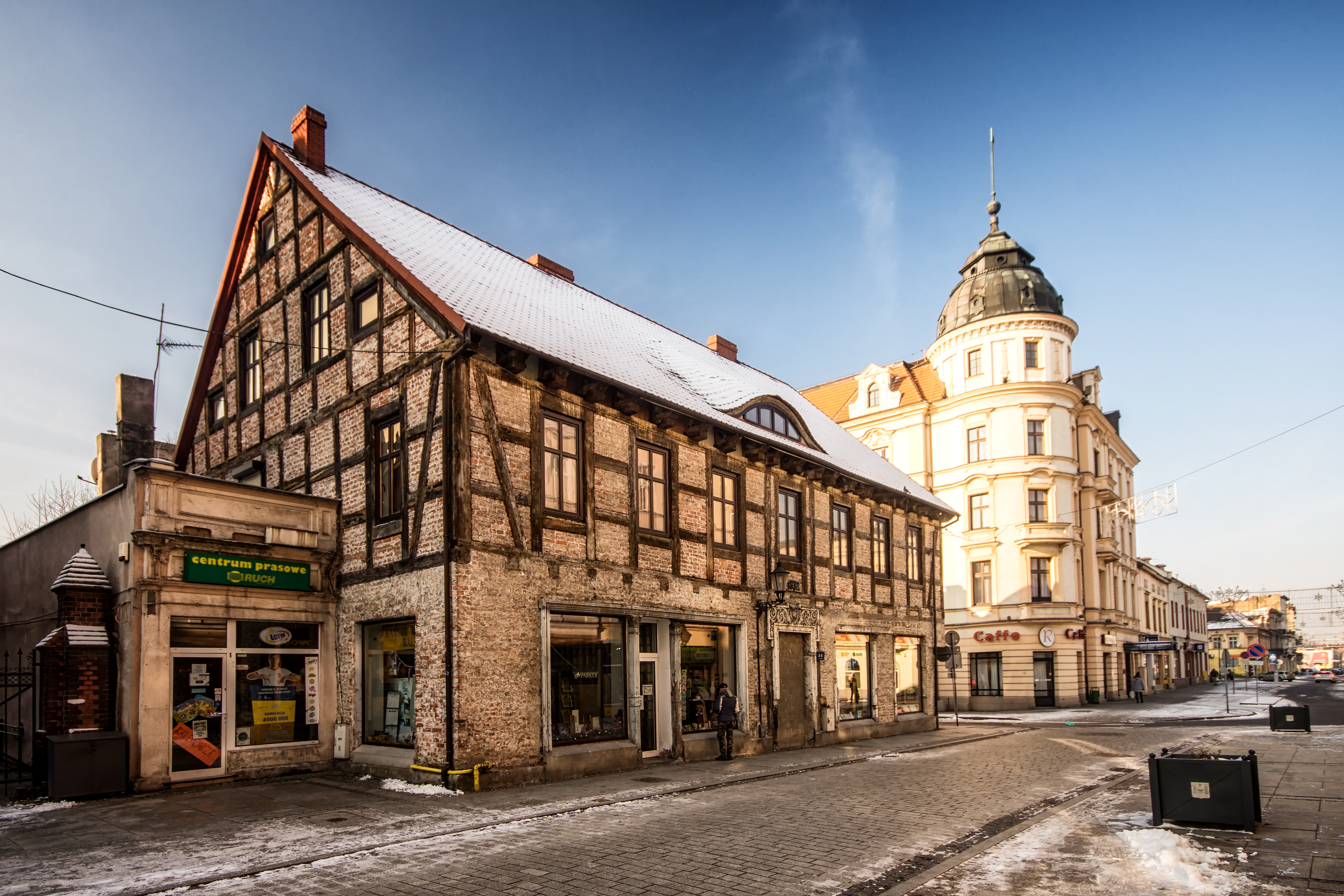
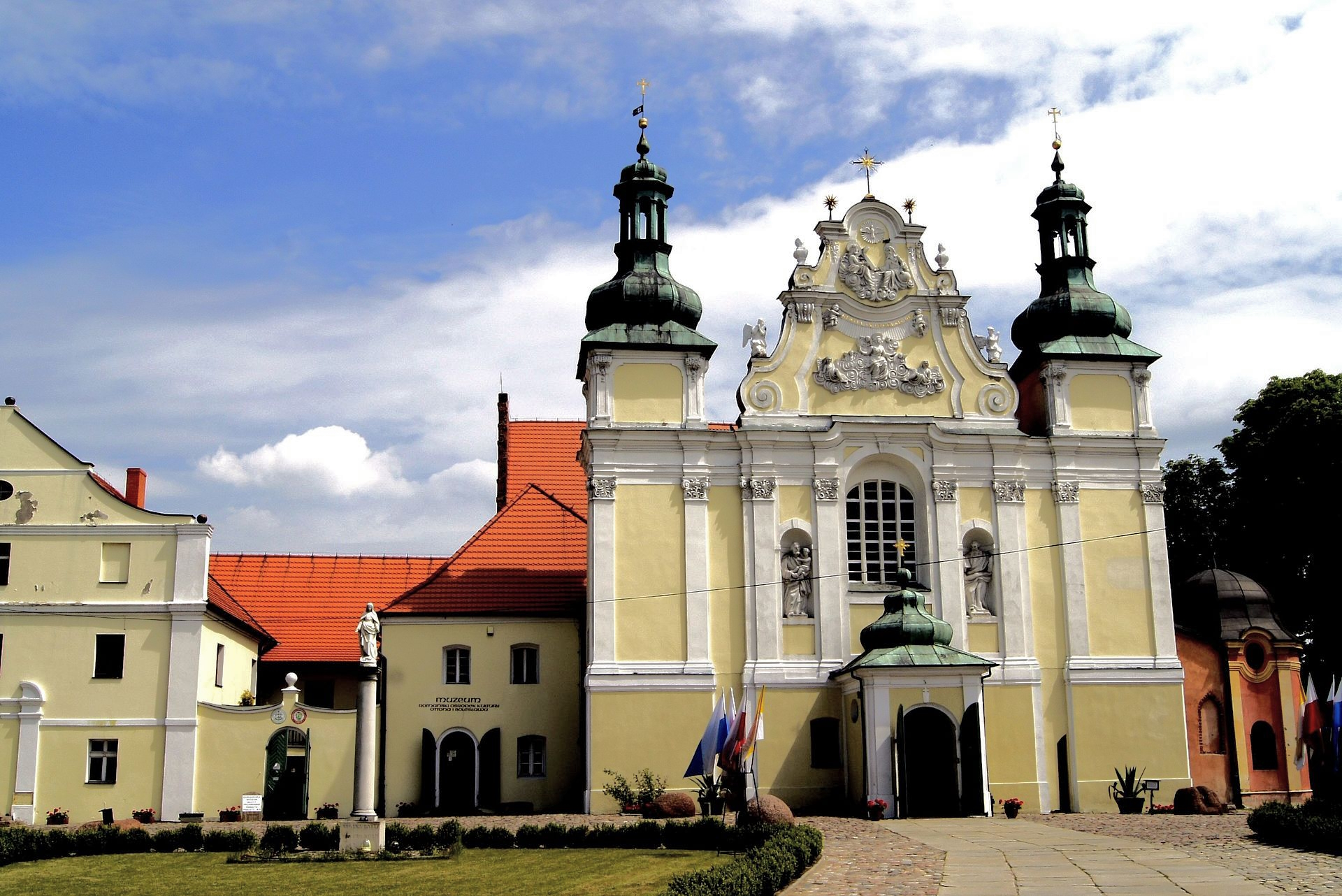
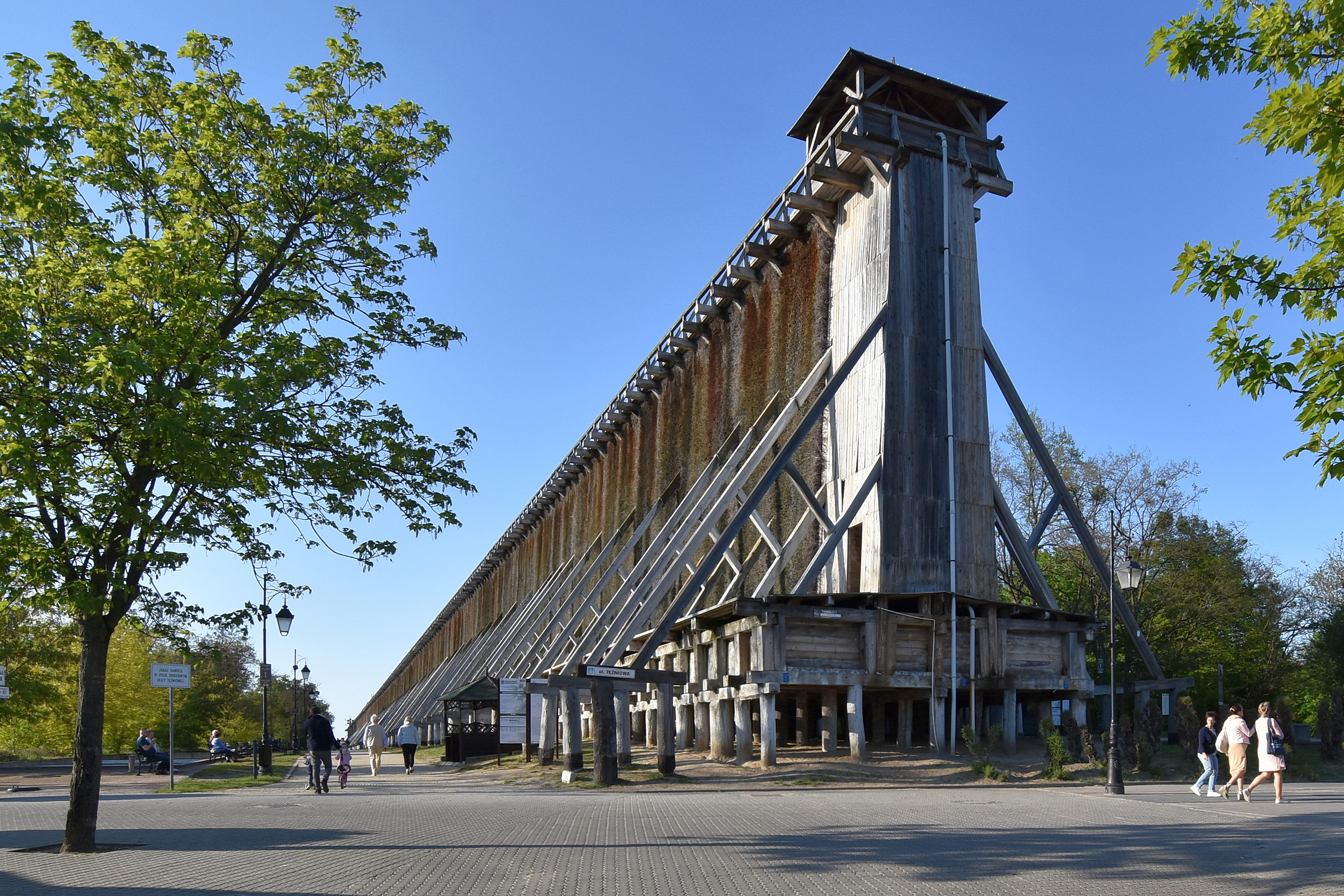
- Bydgoszcz city center Włocławek Cathedral Gopło Lake in Kruszwica Inowrocław city center Holy Trinity Church in Strzelno Ciechocinek graduation towers

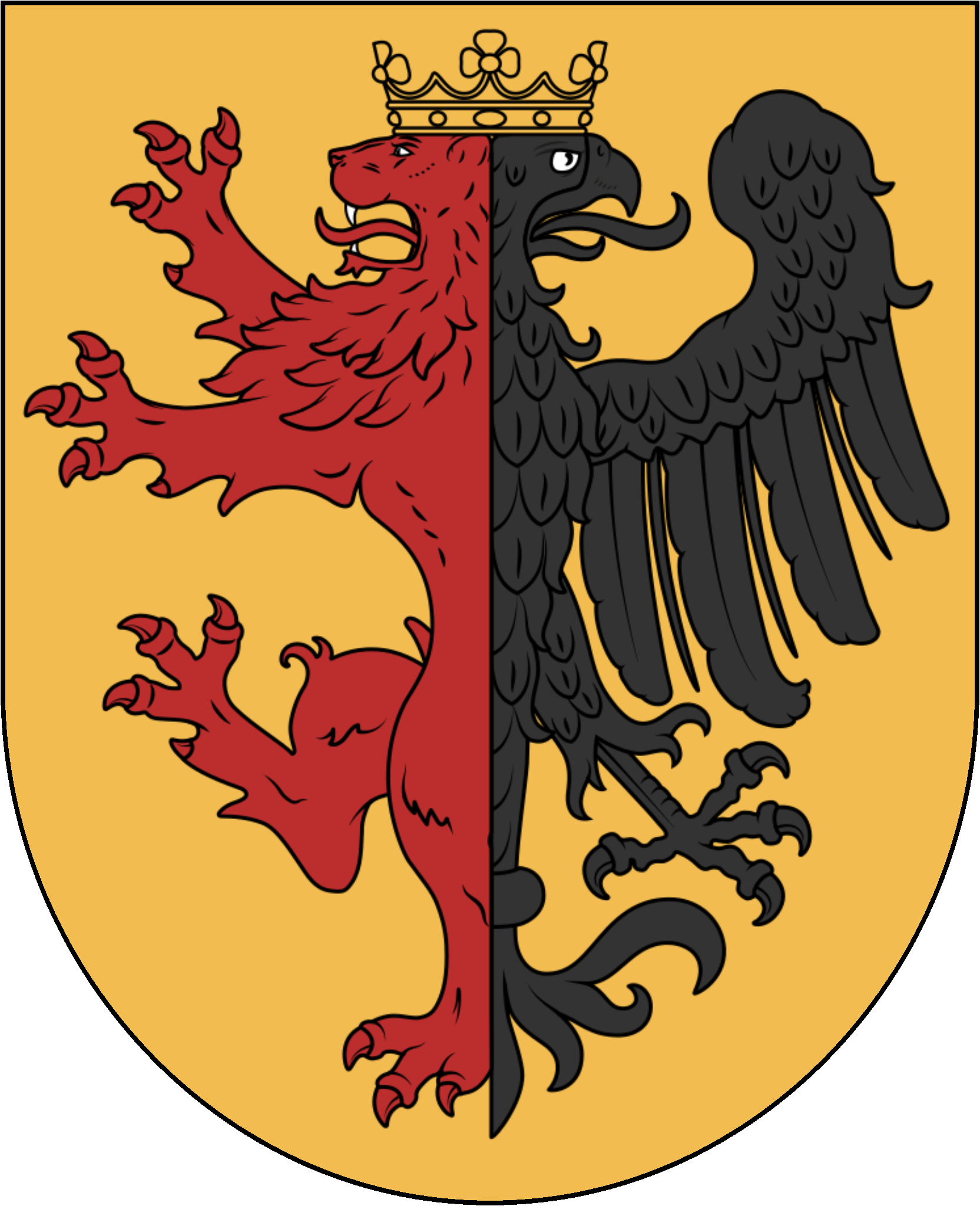
- Coat of arms

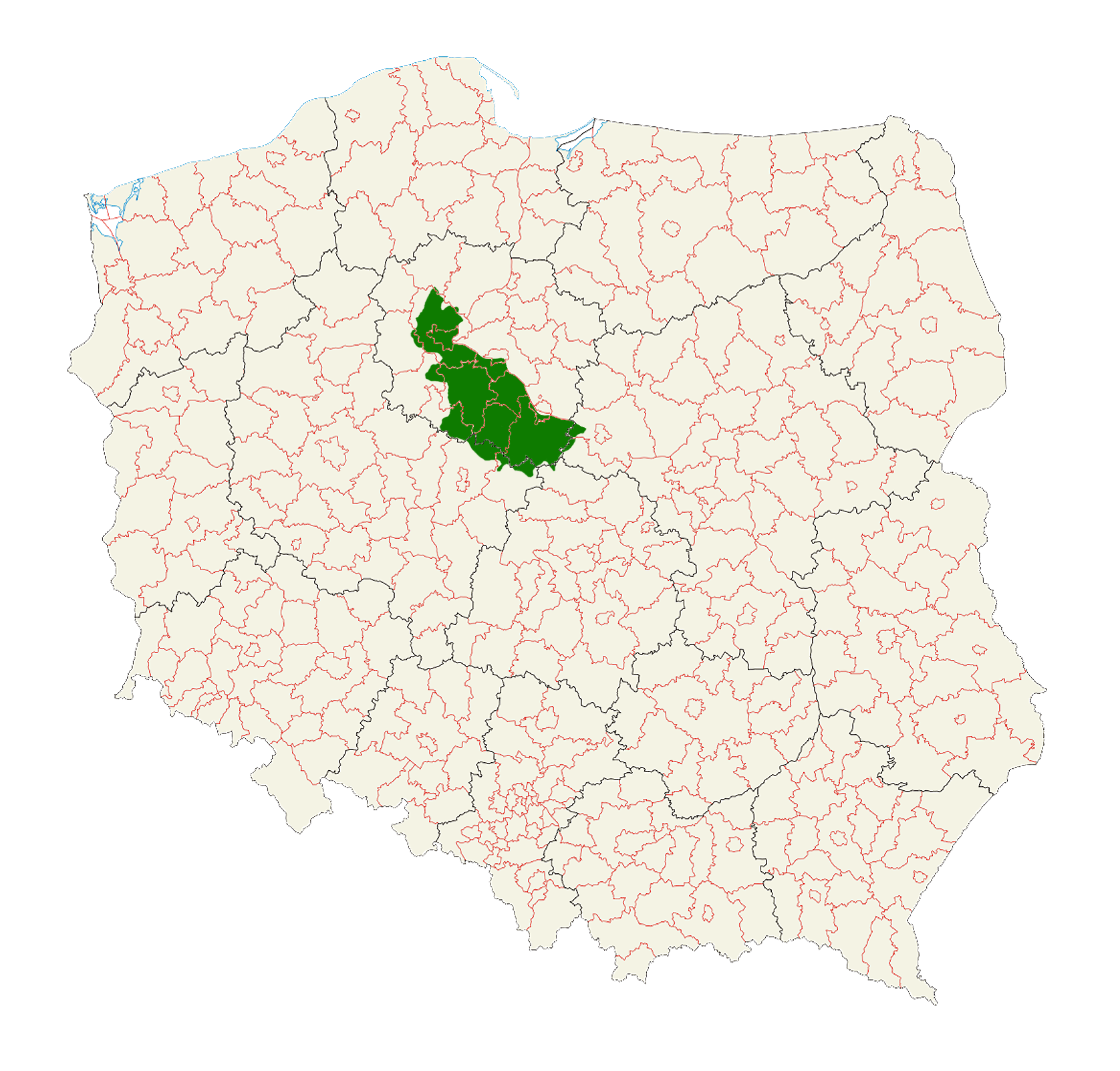
- Location on the map of Poland
- Coordinates: 52°42′N 18°33′E
- Country: Poland
- Largest city: Bydgoszcz

Area
  - Total: 5,989 km^{2} (2,312 sq mi)

Population
  - Total: 950,000
  - Density: 160/km^{2} (410/sq mi)
- Time zone: UTC+1 (CET)
  - Summer (DST): UTC+2 (CEST)
- Primary airport: Bydgoszcz Ignacy Jan Paderewski Airport

Kuyavia (Polish: Kujawy [kuˈjavɨ]; Latin: Cuiavia), also referred to as Cujavia, is a historical region in north-central Poland, situated on the left bank of Vistula, as well as east from Noteć River and Lake Gopło. It is divided into three traditional parts: north-western (with the capital in Bydgoszcz), central (the capital in Inowrocław or Kruszwica), and south-eastern (the capital in Włocławek or Brześć Kujawski).

== Etymology ==
The name Kuyavia first appeared in written sources in the 1136 Bull of Gniezno (Polish: Bulla Gnieźnieńska, Latin: Ex commisso nobis) issued by Pope Innocent II, and was then mentioned in many documents from medieval times. It is also mentioned in the chronicles of Wincenty Kadłubek.

== Geography and boundaries ==
In the north, Kuyavia borders with the historic regions of Gdańsk Pomerania (Pomerelia) and Chełmno Land, in the west with Greater Poland proper, in the south with Łęczyca Land and in the east with Masovia and Dobrzyń Land. The borders of Kuyavia stretch out on the left bank of Vistula River: from the mouth of Skrwa Lewa in the south-east, almost to the mouth of the Wda River to the north.

The borders of Kuyavia spread out to the west from Koronowo and Nakło to the Noteć River where they turn south-west, cross Trląg Lake, and on to Strzelneński Forest, reaching Skulski Lake and the upper Noteć River. The borders enclose Brdowski Lake, Przedecz and Lubień Kujawski through the Skrwa Lewa, ending at the Vistula River.

The southern part of Toruń (Podgórz) lies in the historical region. Some ethnographers and historians, for example Oskar Kolberg and Zygmunt Gloger, count the lands of Dobrzyń and Chełmno north-east of the Vistula as parts of the Kuyavia region.

The Kuyavian lowlands have an average elevation of 100–130 meters above sea level. It is post-glacial landscape, slightly undulating, in some places there are moraine hills and sandy gravel embankments. In deep dykes and depressions there are approximately 600 lakes larger than 1 km^{2}. Under the glacial formations there are layers of rock-salt and potassium, and under Tertiary Period sediments there is lignite and ceramic clay. In Kuyavia there are black fertile soils, thanks to which Kuyavia is called "the granary of Poland".

=== Seats of Kuyavia ===
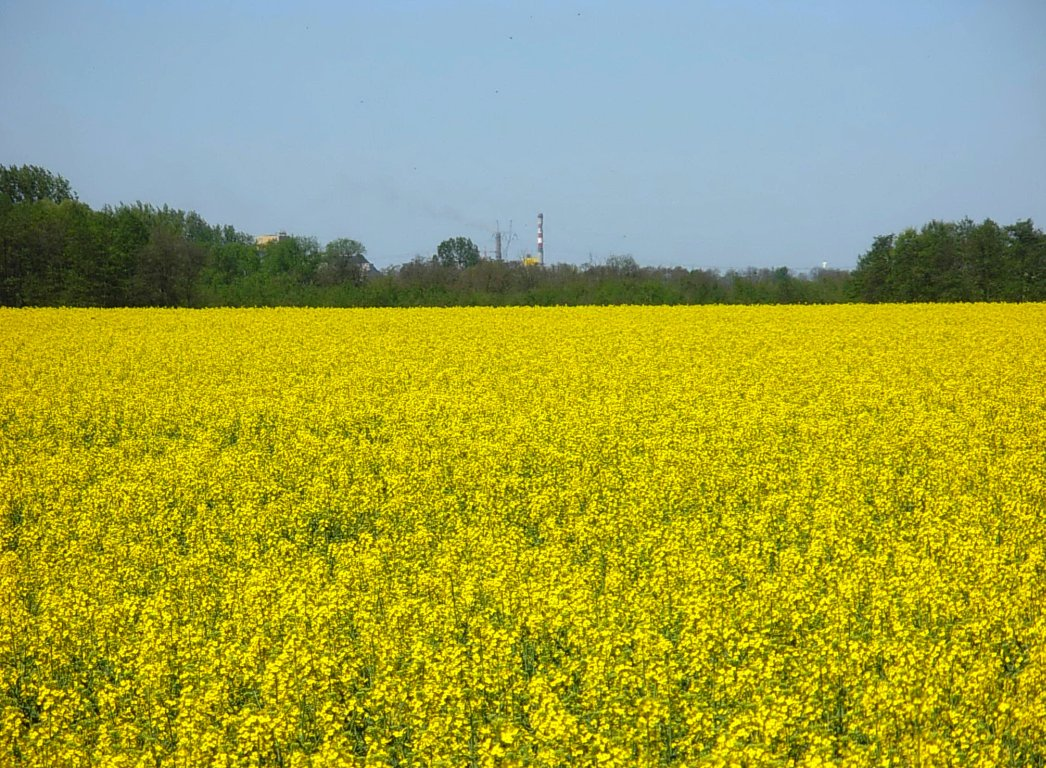
A Kujavian rapeseed field. The region is famous for its rapeseed oil, an essential component of local cuisine

Kuyavia has been historically a rich, densely populated and decentralised region of the Polish state, one of the smaller yet distinct provinces of Poland. Kruszwica was the political centre of the early Goplan tribe, identified with the peoples of Kuyavia. In this area, Kruszwica was also the earliest episcopal see, created on territory split off from archdiocese of Gniezno and as a replacement for the dissolved diocese of Kołobrzeg.

In the middle of the 12th century, its seat was moved to Włocławek. This diocese governed the lands of both Kuyavia and Pomerania. In 1243, the Diocese of Chełmno was founded for Teutonic Chełmno Land. This remained up until the Polish partitions, when episcopate borders were changed. Kuyavia was divided between the dioceses of Gniezno, for the Prussian part, and of Włocławek, for the Russian part. Today in Kuyavia both Włocławek and Bydgoszcz have their own bishoprics.

In 1230, the first independent Duchy of Kuyavia was created, with the capital in Inowrocław. It was defragmented often into smaller principalities, with seats in Bydgoszcz (with Wyszogród), Gniewkowo and Brześć Kujawski. In the late 14th century, the administrative division of the unified Polish kingdom was introduced. In Kuyavia, the residency of the Voivode governors was both Inowrocław and Brześć Kujawski, with Radziejów serving as the seat of the shared regional Sejmik council of the two voivodeships.

Bydgoszcz has been the main economic centre of Kuyavia since the Polish Golden Age. First it was a strategic point as a defensive castle near the Polish border with the hostile Teutonic Order. Soon it became the largest urban centre of Kuyavia and a significant trade hub, specifically serving as an intermediary in trade with Gdańsk, whose importance extended beyond the Kuyavian region. Its economic role involved linking the Baltic port with the hinterlands of the Brda and Noteć rivers as well as sections of Vistula and Warta.

In 1772, Bydgoszcz became the administrative capital of the newly created Netze District in Prussia, encompassing western Kuyavia and Krajna. In the times of Duchy of Warsaw, the Bydgoszcz Department was created and it included the whole Kuyavian area with most of Chełmno Land and valley of the river Noteć in the east. Afterwards, western Kuyavia belonged to Bydgoszcz district in the Grand Duchy of Poznań, while eastern Kuyavia was integrated with Mazovian administrative unit in Congress Poland.

== History ==
The Linear Pottery culture existed in the area. The earliest solid evidence of cheese-making, dating to 5,500 BC, was found in Kuyavia. Enormous tombs, megalithic structures Kuyavian Pyramids from Younger Stone Age.

=== Middle Ages ===
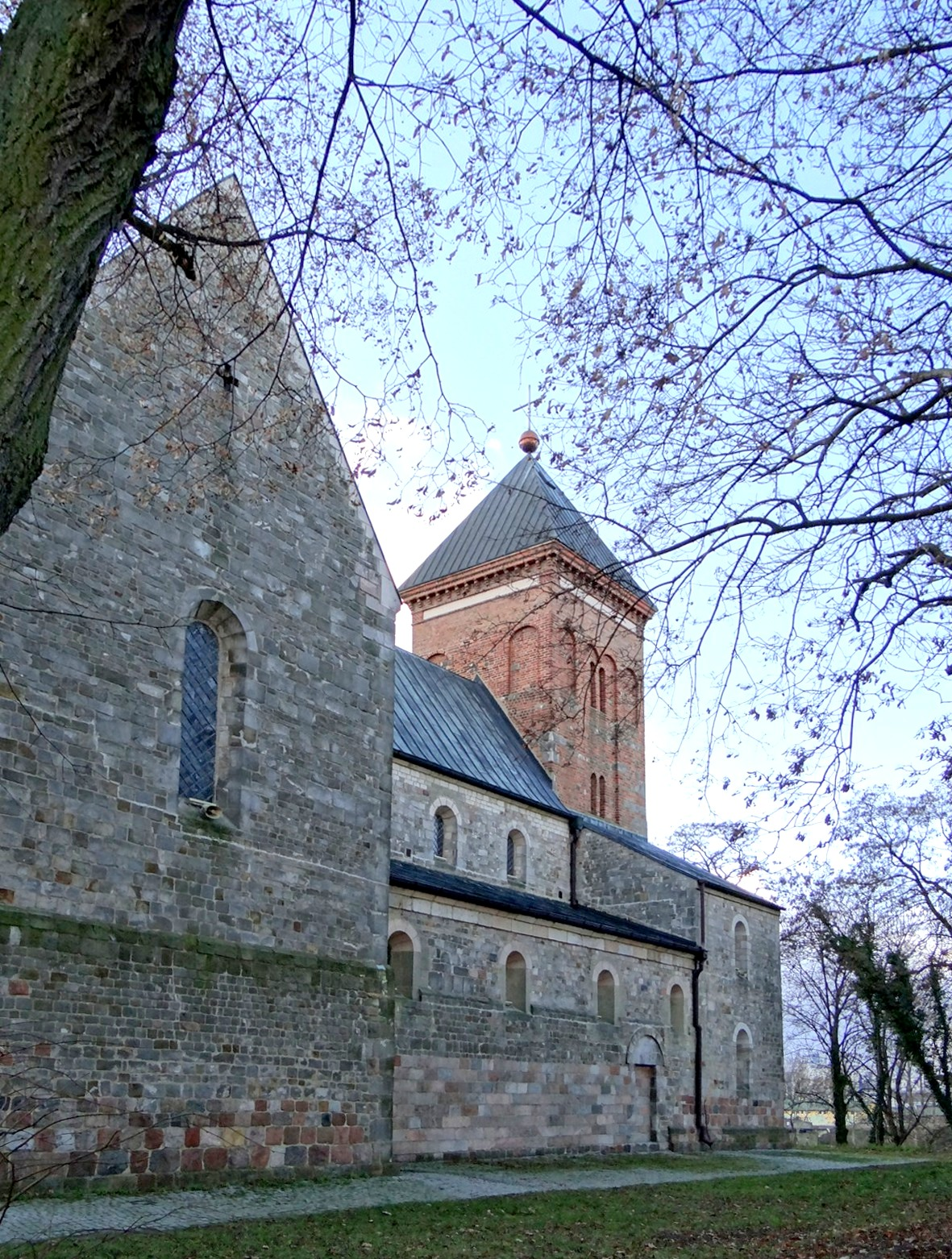
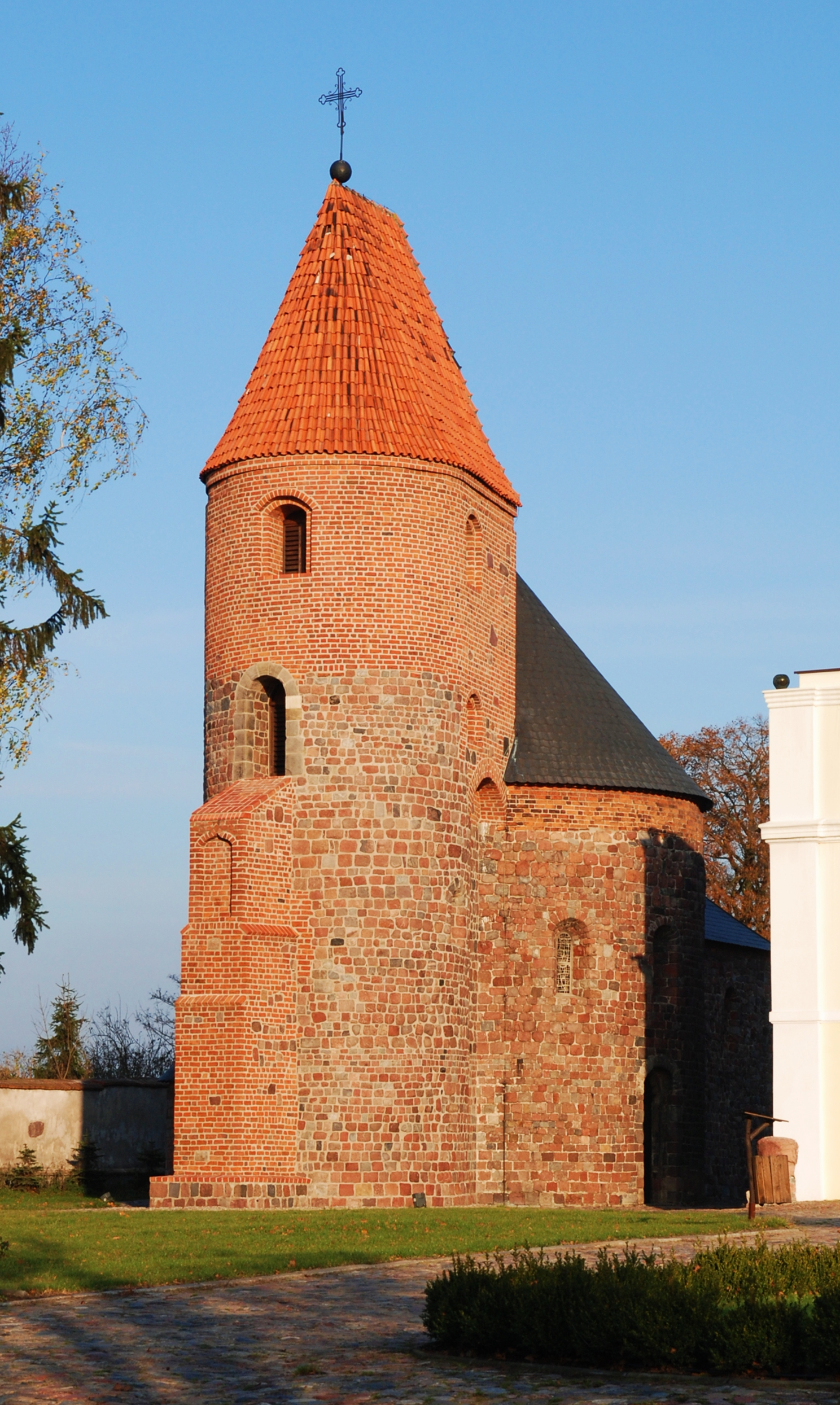
The Romanesque churches of St. Peter and St. Paul in Kruszwica (left) and of St. Procopius in Strzelno (right) are among the oldest in Poland

The beginnings of the state in Kuyavia are connected with the tribal state of the West Slavic Goplans. The Goplans, which some researchers identify with the Mazowszanie-Kłobianie or simply with the Kuyavians, had created a country with the main centers in Kruszwica on the northern shore of Lake Gopło.

During the 10th century, their territory was conquered by another West Slavic tribe, the Polans settling in the adjacent Greater Polish land around Poznań and Gniezno. Upon the death of Duke Mieszko I of Poland in 992, the Kuyavia lands were part of the early Duchy of Poland, mentioned as Civitas Schinesghe as circumscribed in the Dagome iudex papal regesta.

According to Andrzej Bańkowski, the Polans moved into the region of Greater Poland after they had to leave together with the Morawianie, their former Pannonian territories, conquered by the Avars. According to some sources, during the war with the Goplans, the Polans were supported by a Great Moravian army. As a result of occupation of the Goplans' territory, the lands of Kuyavia were under the strong influence of the Pannonian culture and they lost their primary Masovian spirit.

When the name Cuiavia arose for the first time in the 1136 Bull of Gniezno, it referred to the lands east of Greater Poland around Kruszwica and Włocławek, bordering with the Vistula river. The bull confirmed the position of the Bishopric of Kuyavia at Włocławek as a suffragan diocese of the Archdiocese of Gniezno.

=== Polish fragmentation ===
In the times of the Polish fragmentation upon the 1138 Testament of Bolesław III Wrymouth, Kuyavia became part of the Duchy of Masovia under Bolesław IV the Curly and his son Leszek. In 1186, it was claimed by the Polish High Duke Casimir II the Just, contested by his elder brother Mieszko III the Old and his son Bolesław. In 1233, Casimir's son Duke Konrad I of Masovia created the Duchy of Kuyavia for his second son Casimir I.

When Casimir's elder brother Duke Bolesław I of Masovia died in 1248, he took the occasion and took Dobrzyń Land east of the Vistula River from the heritage of his younger brother Siemowit I. Upon Casimir's death in 1267, the Duchy of Kuyavia was divided by his sons Leszek II the Black (d. 1288), Ziemomysł (d. 1287) and Władysław I the Elbow-high, into the two separate duchies of Inowrocław and Brześć Kujawski.

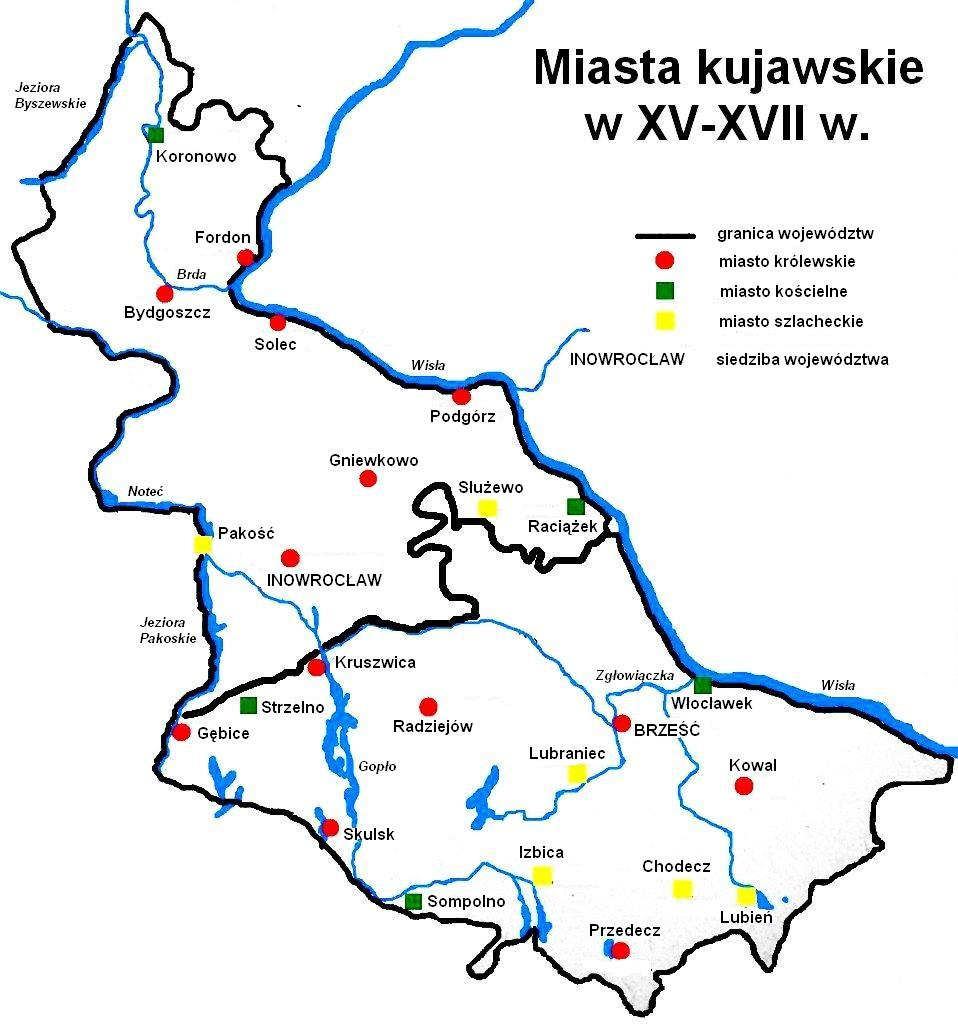
A map of Kuyavia in the 15th-17th centuries

In 1306, Ziemomysł's son Casimir II swore allegiance to his uncle Władysław I, who began to re-unite the Lands of the Polish Crown under his rule. The duchy was devastated during the Polish–Teutonic War of 1326–32, culminating in the 1331 Battle of Płowce. It was restored to Poland by the Teutonic Knights in the 1343 Treaty of Kalisz. With the death of Casimir's son Władysław the White in 1388, the Kuyavian line of the Piast dynasty became extinct.

At the peak of its fragmentation, the Kuyavian territories were divided in the early 14th century into Duchy of Bydgoszcz and Wyszogród, Duchy of Inowrocław, Duchy of Gniewkowo and Duchy of Brześć Kujawski. They were fully reintegrated during the reign of Casimir III the Great.

=== Crown of the Kingdom of Poland ===
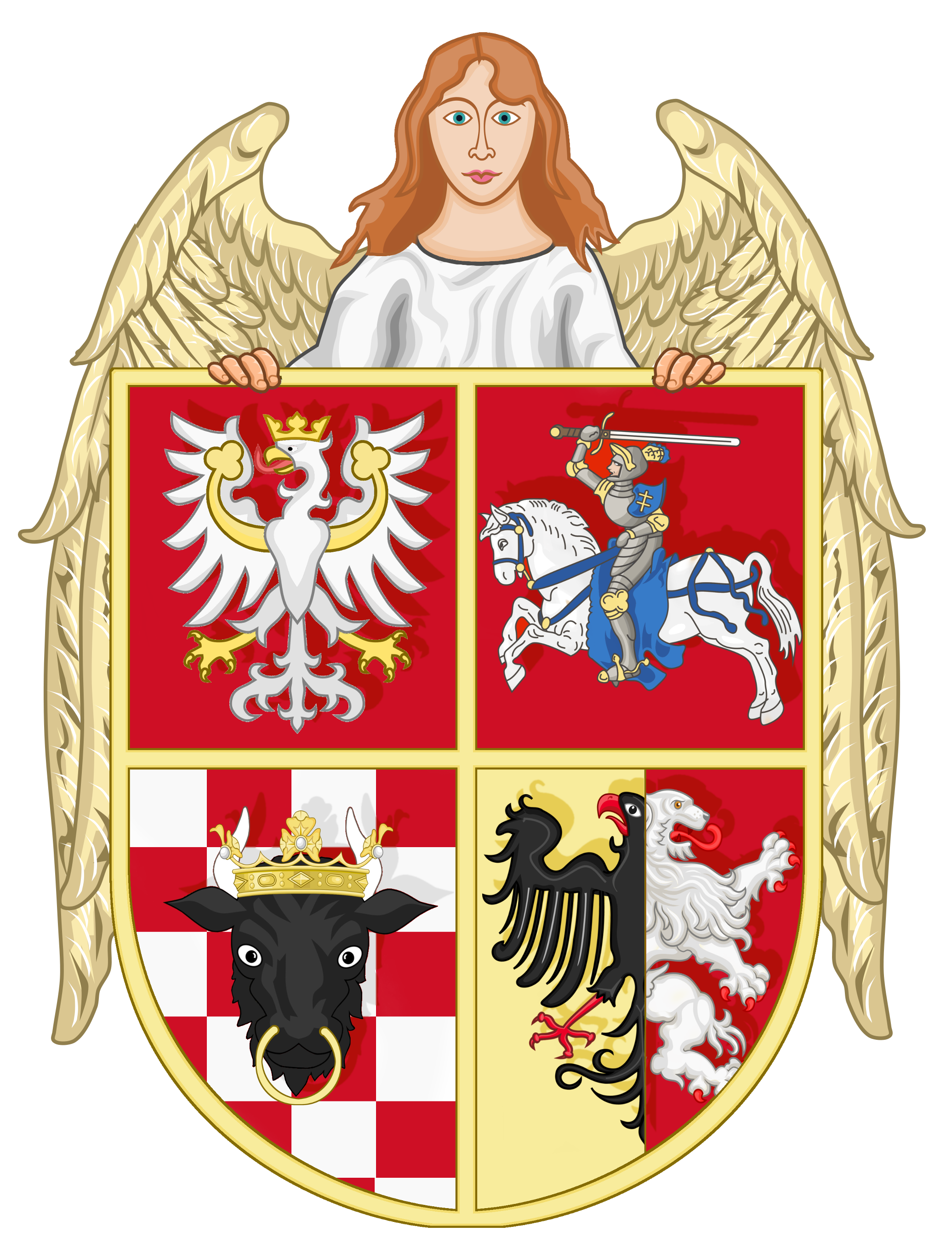
The importance of Kuyavia was depicted on the arms of Jagiellon rulers Władysław II, Casimir IV, and John I Albert.

After the reunification of Polish lands in the late 14th century, the division into provinces and counties was introduced. That division finalized in the 15th century and existed until the dissolution of the Polish–Lithuanian Commonwealth in 1795. Kuyavia was divided into the two administrative divisions of Brześć Kujawski Voivodeship and Inowrocław Voivodeship.

The Brześć Kujawski Voivodeship was further divided into five powiats (counties): Brześć, Kowal, Kruszwica, Przedecz and Radziejów. The Inowrocław Voivodeship was divided into the Bydgoszcz and Inowrocław powiats and Dobrzyń Land east of the Vistula. Both voivodeships formed part of the larger Greater Poland Province of the Kingdom of Poland and the Polish–Lithuanian Commonwealth. The Battle of Koronowo of the Polish–Lithuanian–Teutonic War was fought in the region on 10 October 1410, and ended in a Polish victory.

The long period of prosperity ended in the late 17th century during Northern Wars with the Swedish troops destroying and plundering many cities, including Bydgoszcz, Inowrocław, and Włocławek.

=== Partitions of Poland ===
As a result of the First Partition of Poland in 1772 the Kingdom of Prussia took a considerable part of Inowrocław Voivodeship and the western part of Brześć Kujawski Voivodeship, and included it within its newly formed Netze District with the capital in Bydgoszcz. After the Second Partition of 1793 the whole of Kuyavia was taken by Prussia and incorporated into the newly formed province of South Prussia. Upon the 1807 Treaties of Tilsit, it was part of the Napoleonic Duchy of Warsaw and administered within the Bydgoszcz Department.

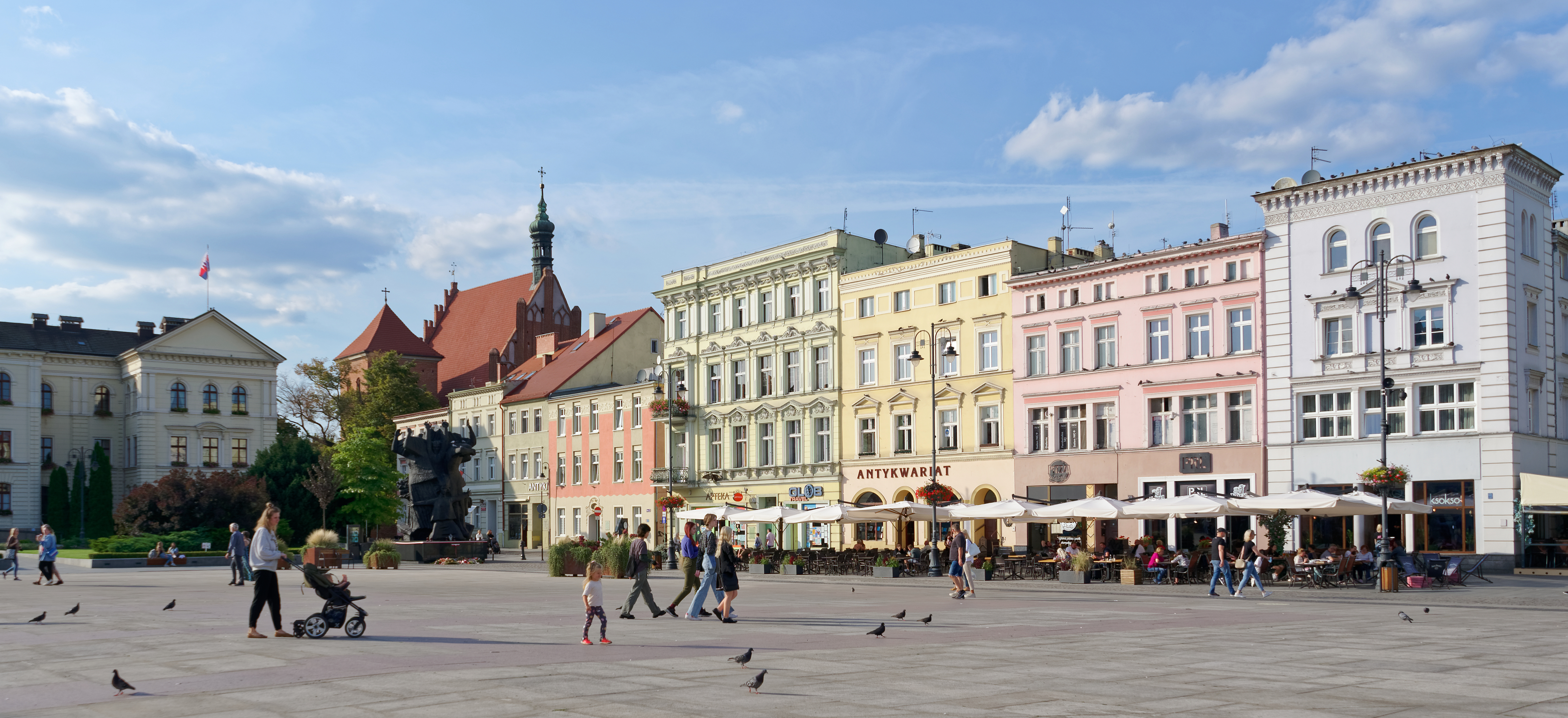
The Old Town and Market Square in Bydgoszcz, the largest city of Kuyavia

In 1815 under the provisions of the Congress of Vienna, Kuyavia was divided between the Kingdom of Poland and the Kingdom of Prussia. Congress Poland remained in a personal union with the Russian Empire, from 1831 direct part of Russian Empire. The Brześć Kujawski province (counties: Aleksandrów, Radziejów and Włocławek) remained with the Masovia Governorate of Congress Poland in Russian Empire. Inowrocław (Hohensalza) and Bydgoszcz (Bromberg) was incorporated into the Prussian Grand Duchy of Posen.

The Polish population resisted anti-Polish policies, which included forced Germanisation and Russification, and took part in several uprisings incl. the Greater Poland uprising of 1848 and January Uprising of 1863–1864. That division outlasted the 1871 unification of Germany until the end of World War I.

=== Republic of Poland ===
Following World War I, Poland regained independence and control of the region. Within the Second Polish Republic, from 1918, the western part of Kuyavia belonged to Poznań Voivodeship, and the eastern part belonged to the Warsaw Voivodeship. In 1938 almost all Kuyavia became a part of Pomeranian Voivodeship. In 1934 the Muzeum Nadgoplańskie in Kruszwica was built. It was opened in 1939, and it had valuable collection of ethnographical objects, inter alia: furniture and clothing.

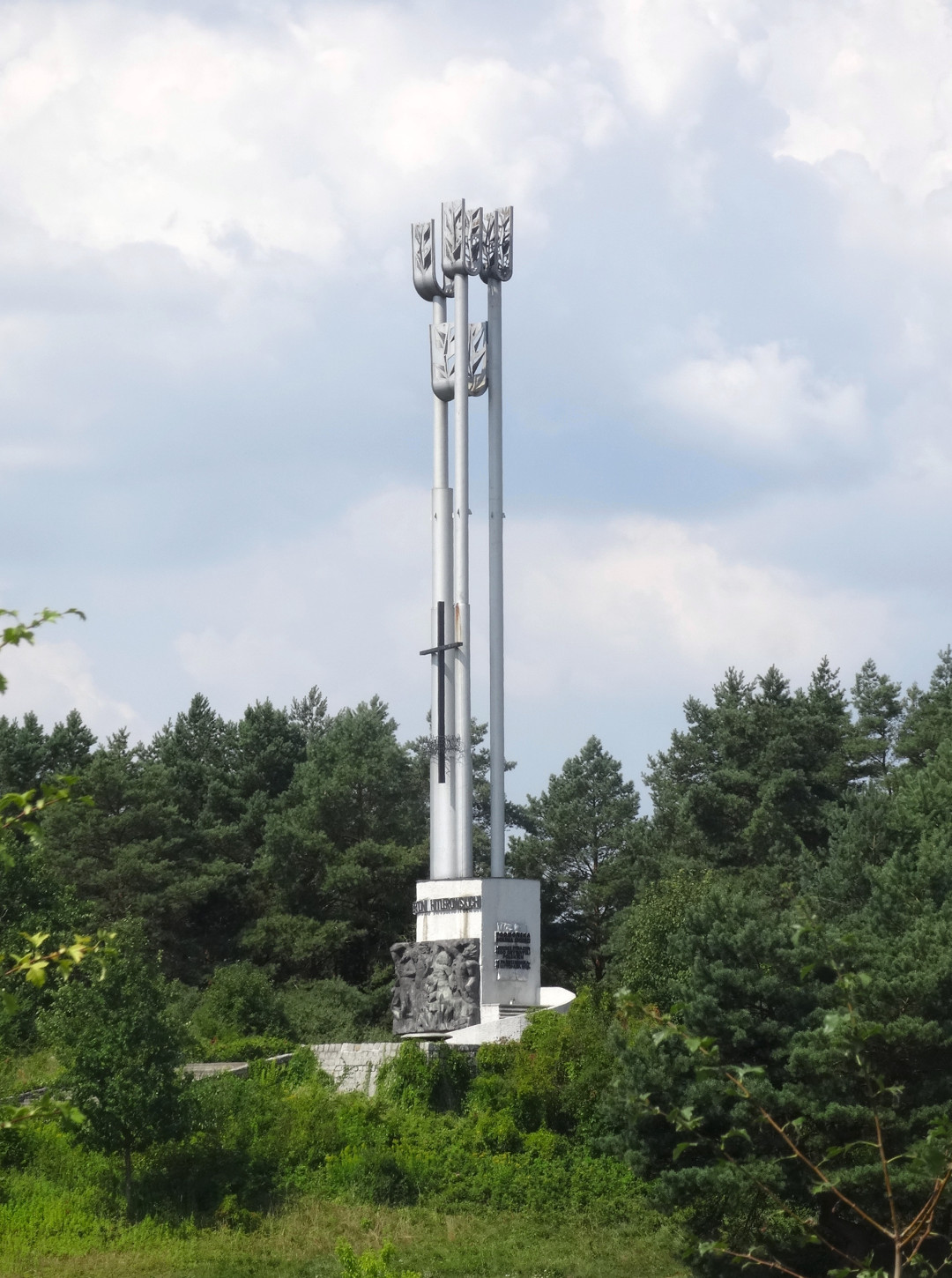
A monument in the Valley of Death in Bydgoszcz

Following the joint German-Soviet invasion of Poland, which started World War II in September 1939, it was occupied by Nazi Germany. During the occupation, almost all of Kuyavia was annexed into the newly formed province of Reichsgau Wartheland, except the northwestern part with the city of Bydgoszcz that was annexed to the newly formed province of Reichsgau Danzig-West Prussia.

The Polish population was subjected to various crimes, such as mass arrests, imprisonment, slave labor, expulsions, kidnapping of children, deportations to Nazi concentration camps and extermination, incl. the Intelligenzaktion. Major sites of massacres of Poles in the region included Gniewkowo, Fordon, Otorowo, Buszkowo, Tryszczyn, Odolion and Borówno.

The Germans operated subcamps of the Potulice and Stutthof concentration camps in Bydgoszcz, and the large Stalag XX-A prisoner-of-war camp for Polish, British, French, Australian and Soviet POWs in southern Toruń. In 1945, the German occupation ended and the region was restored to Poland.

Between 1945-1975, Kuyavia was in the borders of Bydgoszcz Voivodeship. The Włocławek Voivodeship was created in 1975, and the western part of Kuyavia remained in the Bydgoszcz Voivodeship. In 1999 almost the whole of Kuyavia was joined to the Kuyavian-Pomeranian Voivodeship. Small parts of the region were included in the borders of the Masovian Voivodeship (regions between the border of the province and Skrwa Lewa River) and Greater Poland Voivodeship (Przedecz, Wierzbinek).

== Cities and towns ==
	City	Population (2023)	Voivodeship in the Kingdom of Poland	Voivodeship today	City rights	Additional information
1.	Bydgoszcz	328,370	Inowrocław	Kuyavian-Pomeranian	1346	Former royal city of Poland, part of the Bydgoszcz–Toruń metropolitan area.
2.	Włocławek	101,450	Brześć Kujawski	Kuyavian-Pomeranian	1255	Historical capital of Kuyavia.
3.	Inowrocław	67,745	Inowrocław	Kuyavian-Pomeranian	1237/38	Spa town, former voivodeship capital, former royal city of Poland.
4.	Solec Kujawski	15,290	Inowrocław	Kuyavian-Pomeranian	1325	Part of the Bydgoszcz–Toruń metropolitan area, former royal city of Poland.
5.	Aleksandrów Kujawski	11,470	Inowrocław	Kuyavian-Pomeranian	1919	Part of the Bydgoszcz–Toruń metropolitan area.
6.	Koronowo	10,754	Inowrocław	Kuyavian-Pomeranian	1370	
7.	Ciechocinek	10,214	Inowrocław	Kuyavian-Pomeranian	1916	Spa town.
8.	Kruszwica	9,131	Brześć Kujawski	Kuyavian-Pomeranian	1422	Former royal city of Poland.
9.	Janikowo	8,186	Inowrocław	Kuyavian-Pomeranian	1962	
10.	Gniewkowo	6,685	Inowrocław	Kuyavian-Pomeranian	1268	Former royal city of Poland.
11.	Strzelno	5,240	Brześć Kujawski	Kuyavian-Pomeranian	1231	
12.	Pakość	5,152	Inowrocław	Kuyavian-Pomeranian	1359	Former private town.
13.	Radziejów	5,081	Brześć Kujawski	Kuyavian-Pomeranian	1252	Former royal city of Poland.
14.	Brześć Kujawski	4,544	Brześć Kujawski	Kuyavian-Pomeranian		Former voivodeship capital, former royal city of Poland.
15.	Piotrków Kujawski	4,217	Brześć Kujawski	Kuyavian-Pomeranian		
16.	Sompolno	3,341	Brześć Kujawski	Greater Poland	1477	
17.	Kowal	3,288	Brześć Kujawski	Kuyavian-Pomeranian		Former royal city of Poland.
18.	Lubraniec	2,716	Brześć Kujawski	Kuyavian-Pomeranian	1509	Former private town.
19.	Izbica Kujawska	2,456	Brześć Kujawski	Kuyavian-Pomeranian	1394	Former private town.
20.	Nieszawa	1,743	Brześć Kujawski	Kuyavian-Pomeranian	1460	Former royal city of Poland.
21.	Chodecz	1,712	Brześć Kujawski	Kuyavian-Pomeranian	1442	Former private town.
22.	Przedecz	1,516	Brześć Kujawski	Greater Poland	1365	Former royal city of Poland.
23.	Lubień Kujawski	1,332	Brześć Kujawski	Kuyavian-Pomeranian		Former private town.

== Sports ==
The most successful and popular sports clubs in the region include motorcycle speedway team Polonia Bydgoszcz, basketball teams Anwil Włocławek, Astoria Bydgoszcz (men) and Basket 25 Bydgoszcz (women) and volleyball teams Chemik Bydgoszcz (men) and Pałac Bydgoszcz (women).

== Gallery ==
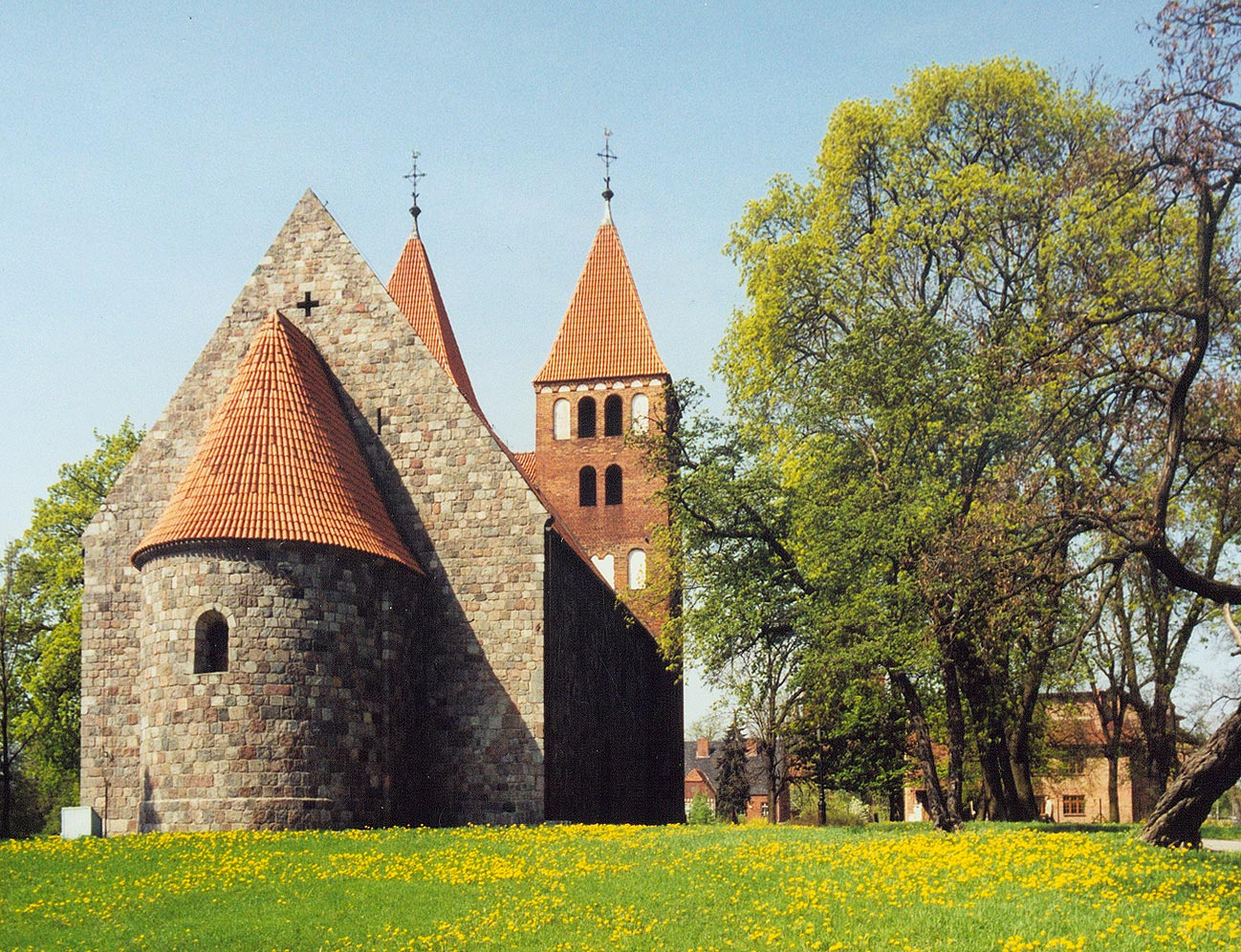
12th-century Holy Virgin Mary church in Inowrocław

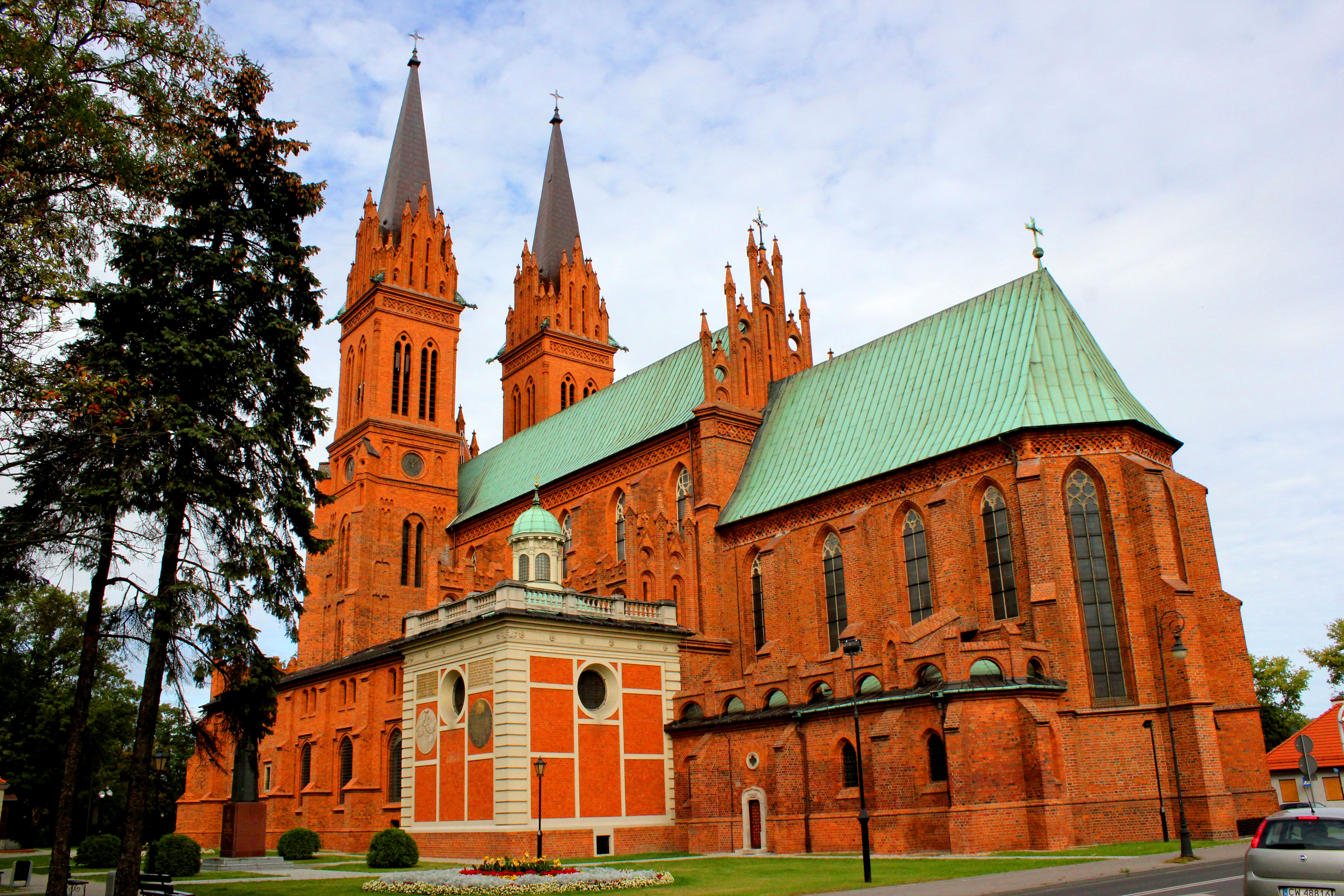
Włocławek Cathedral

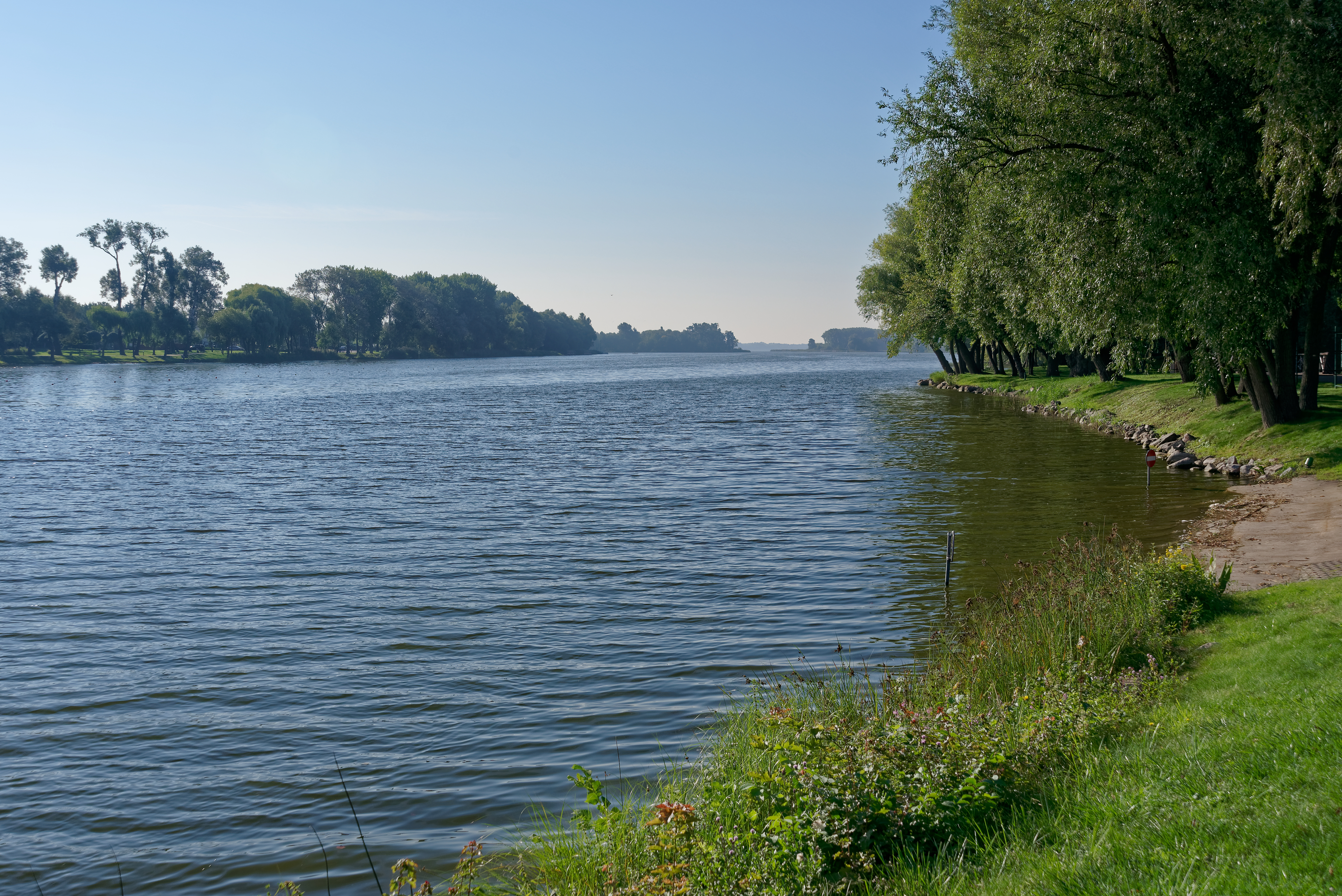
Gopło Lake

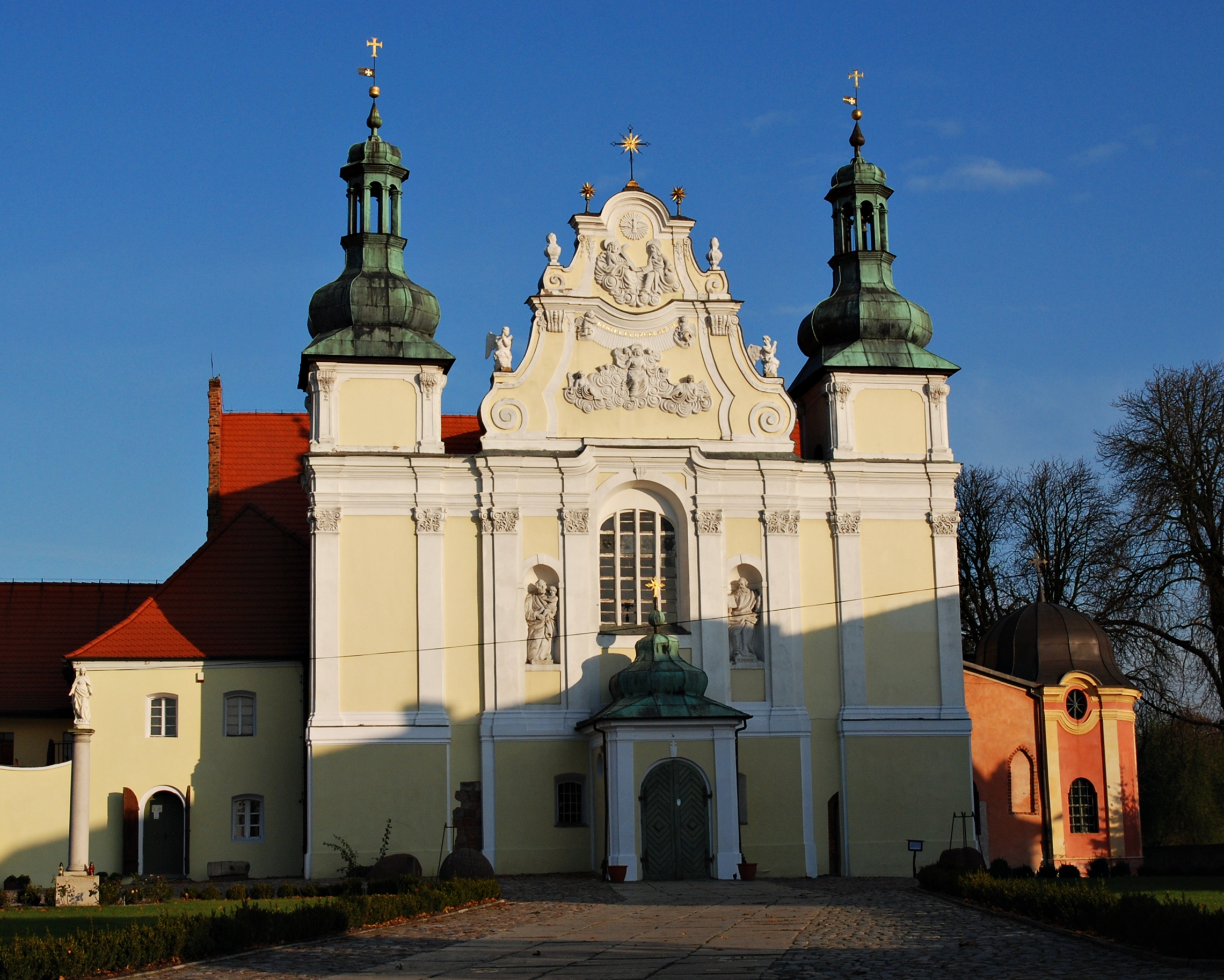
Holy Trinity Church in Strzelno

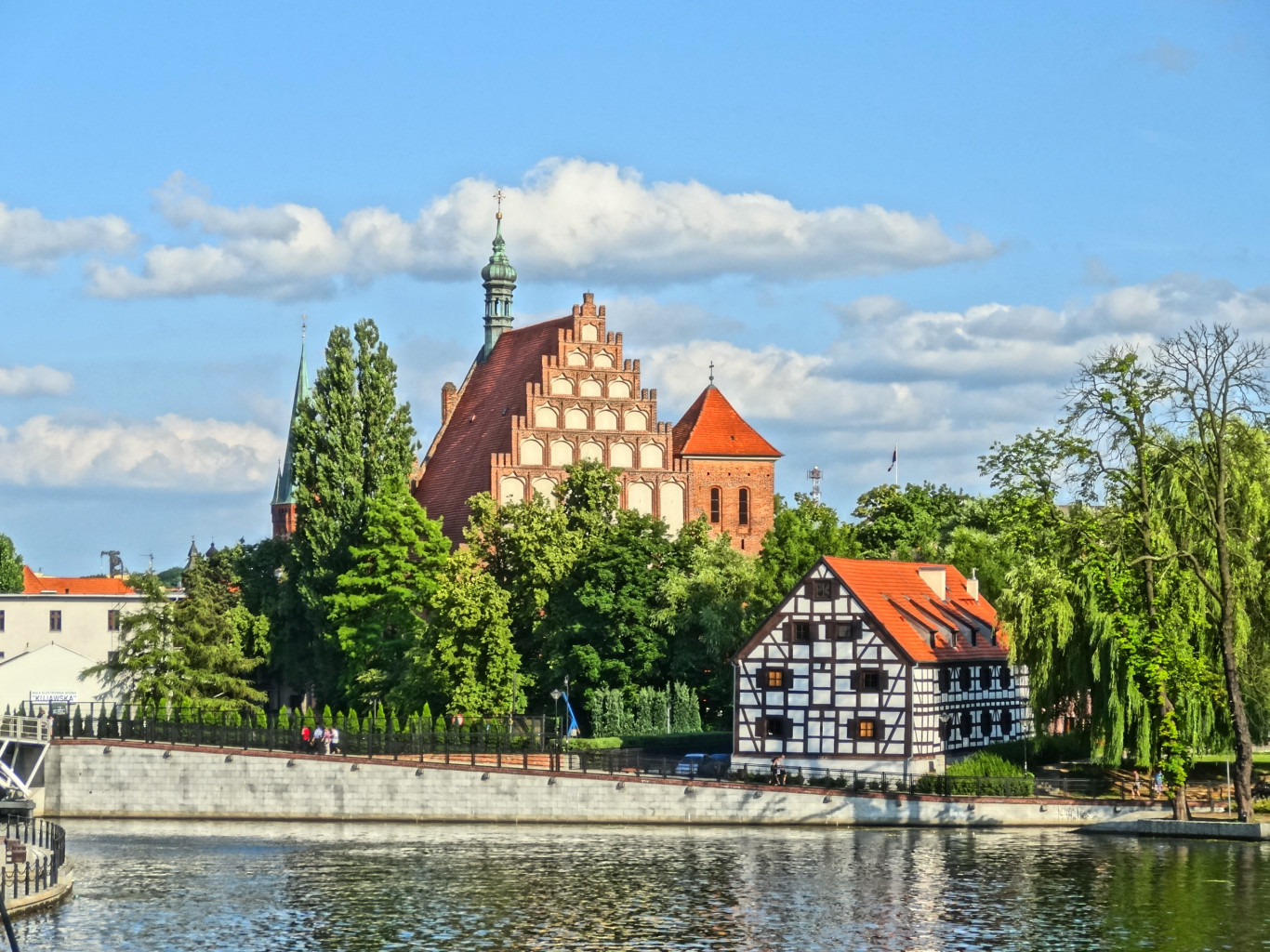
Bydgoszcz riverfront with the Bydgoszcz Cathedral and White Granary

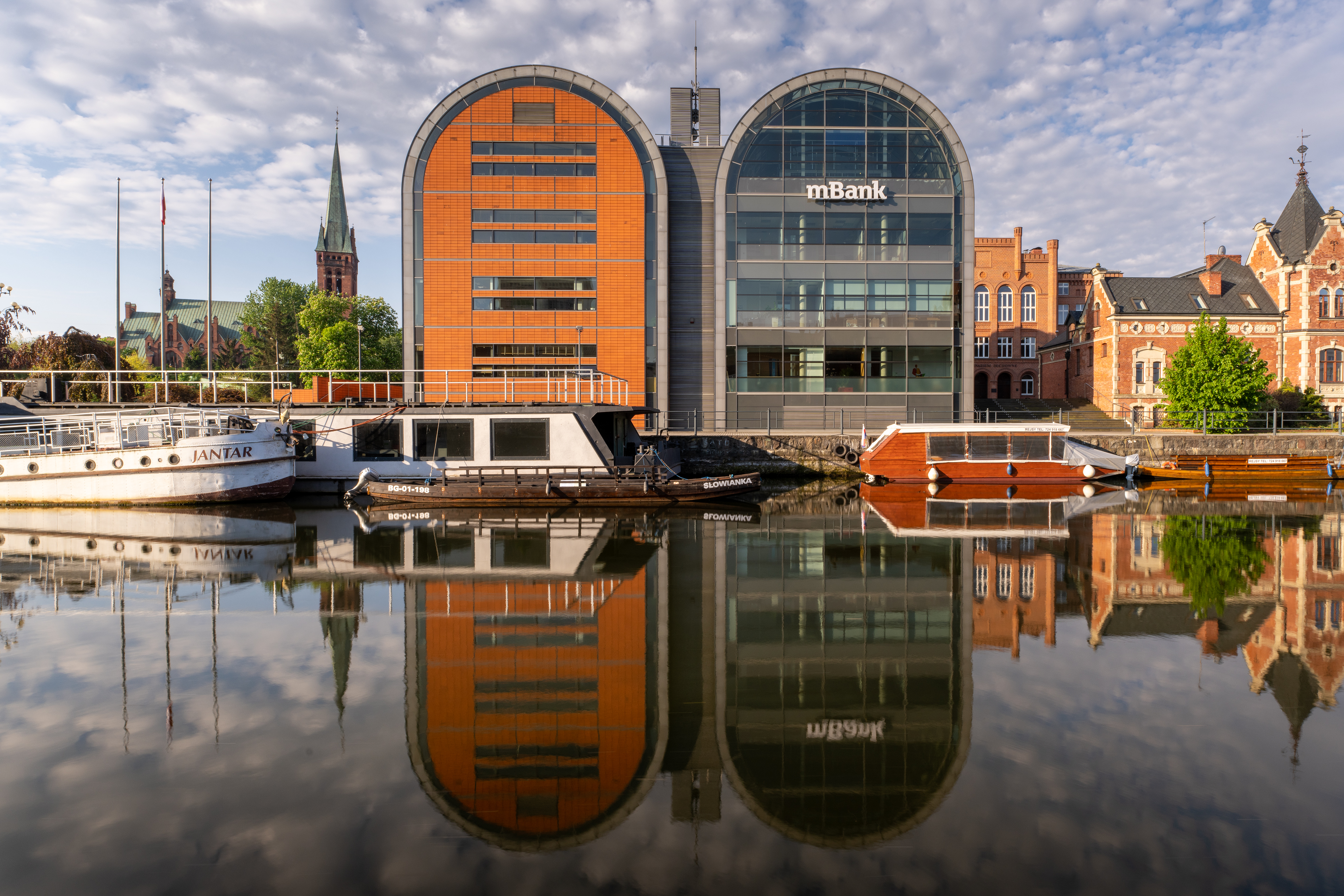
New granaries by the Brda river in Bydgoszcz

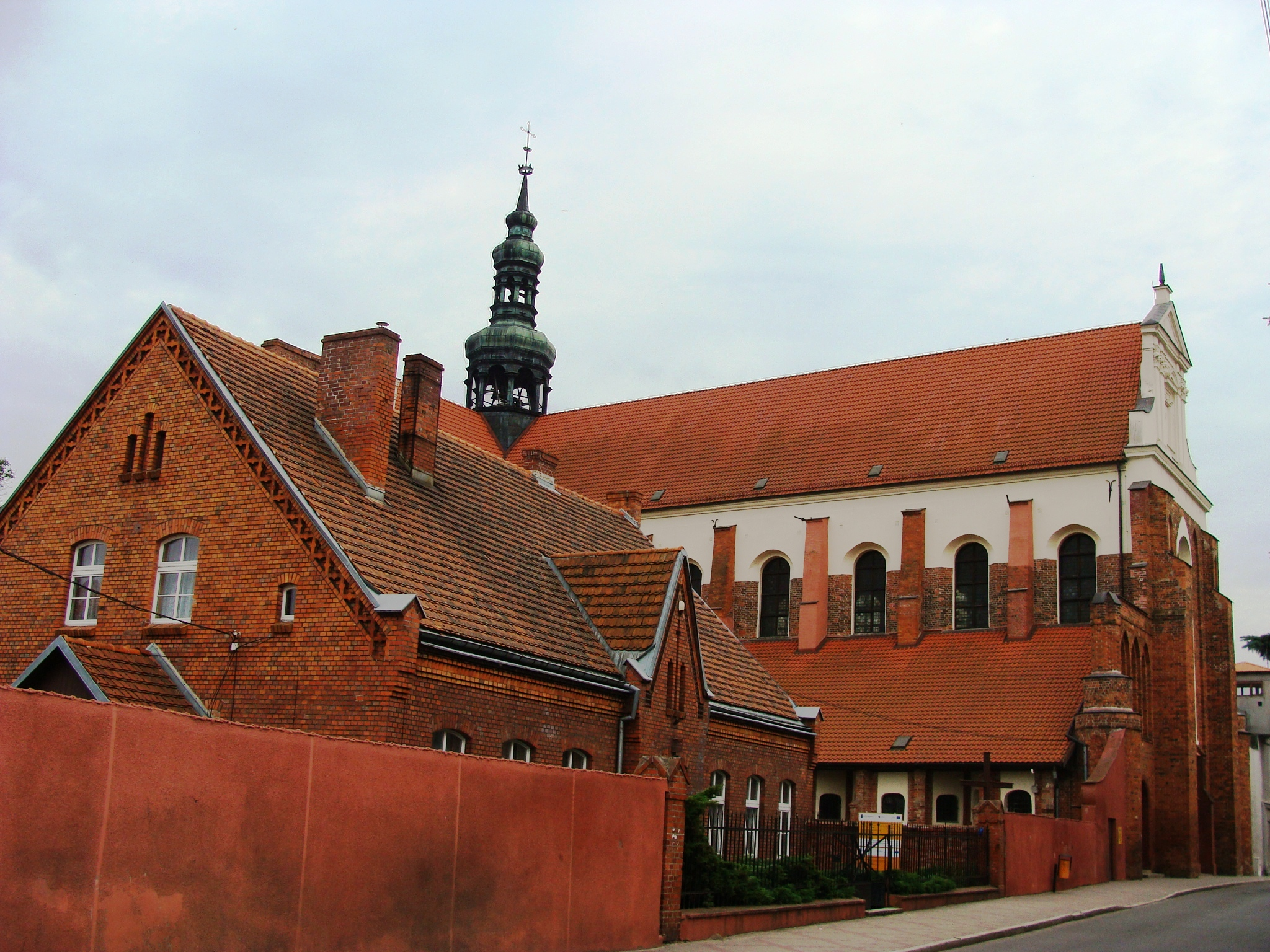
Church of the Assumption in Koronowo

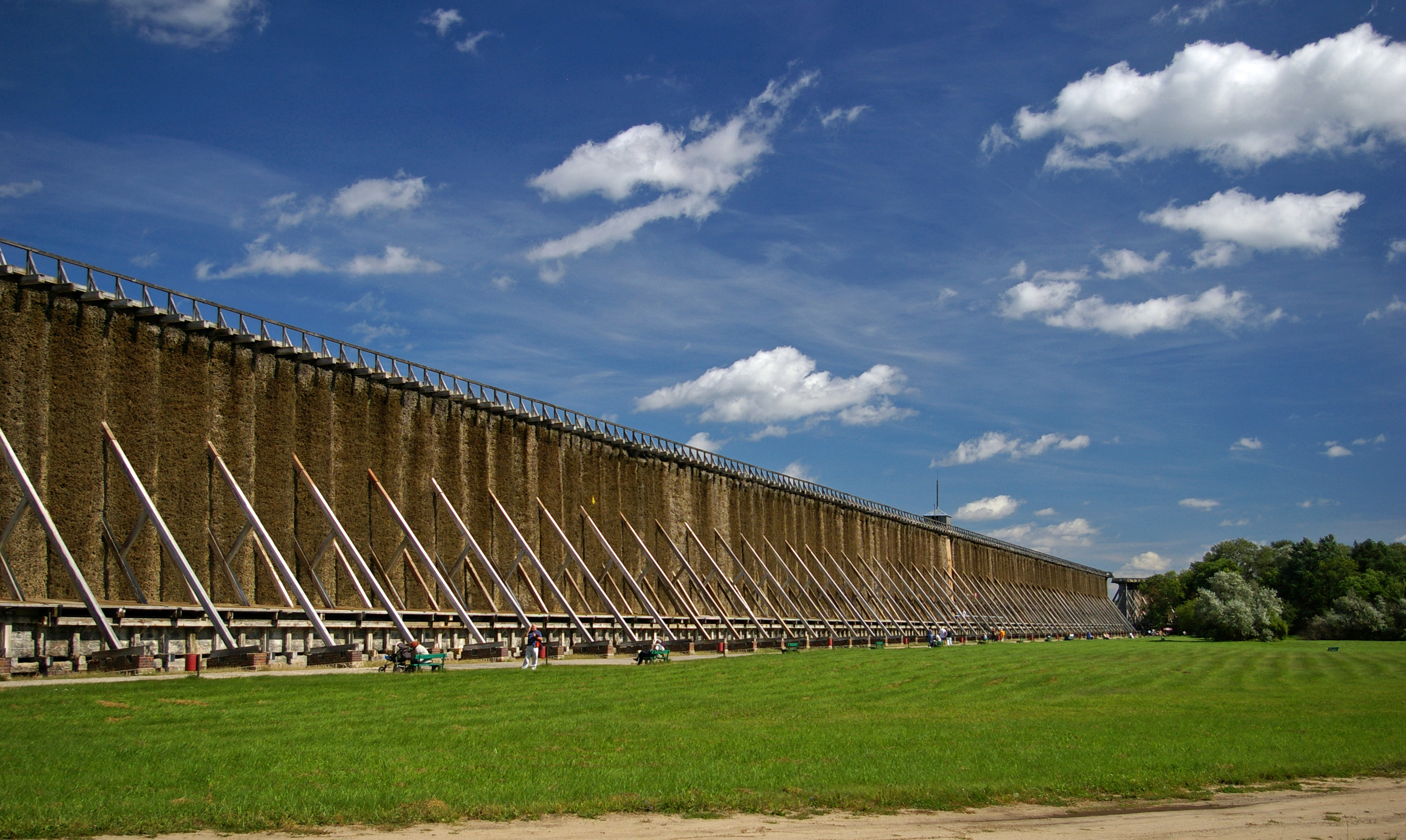
Graduation towers in Ciechocinek

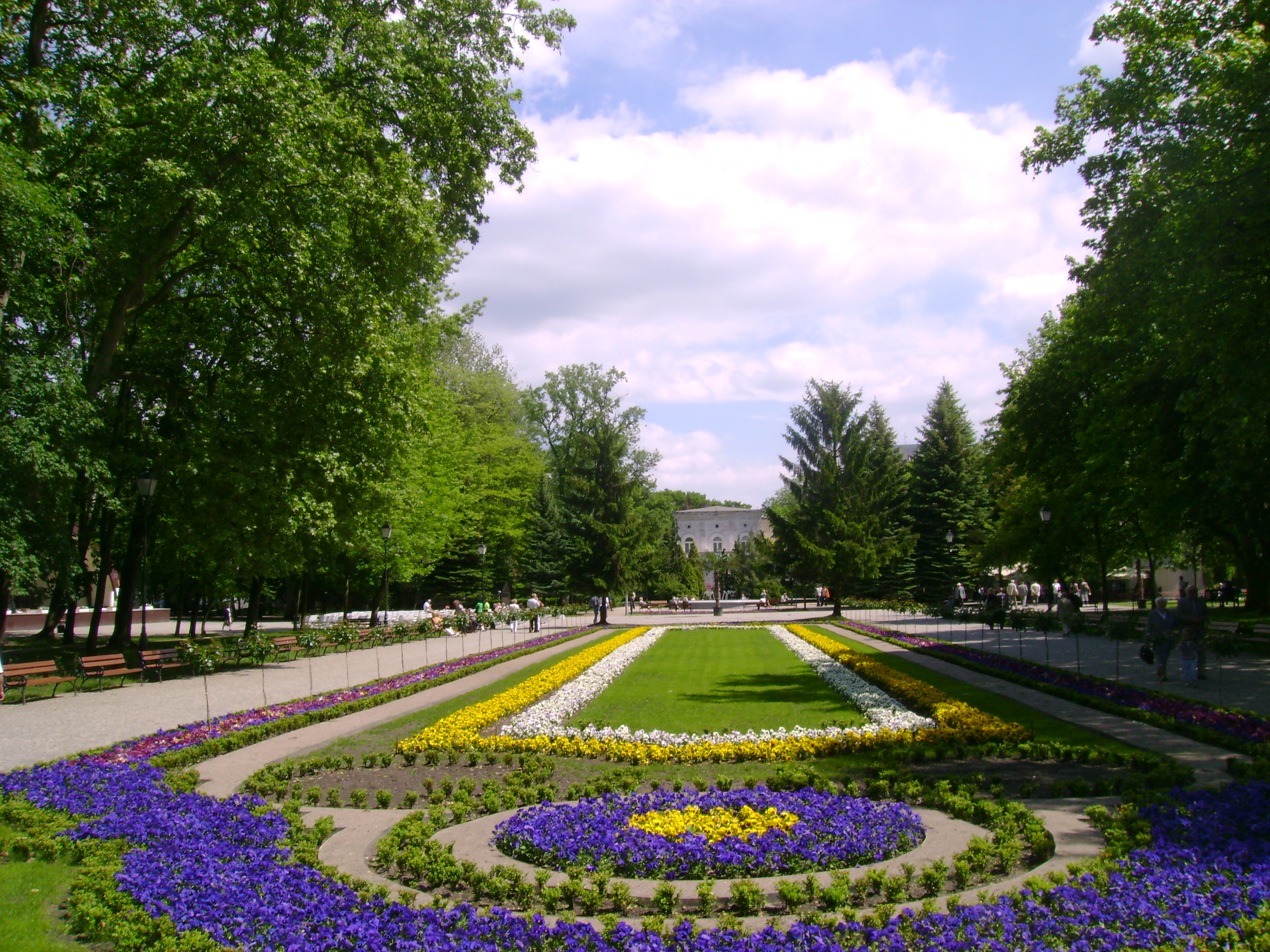
Solanka Park in Inowrocław

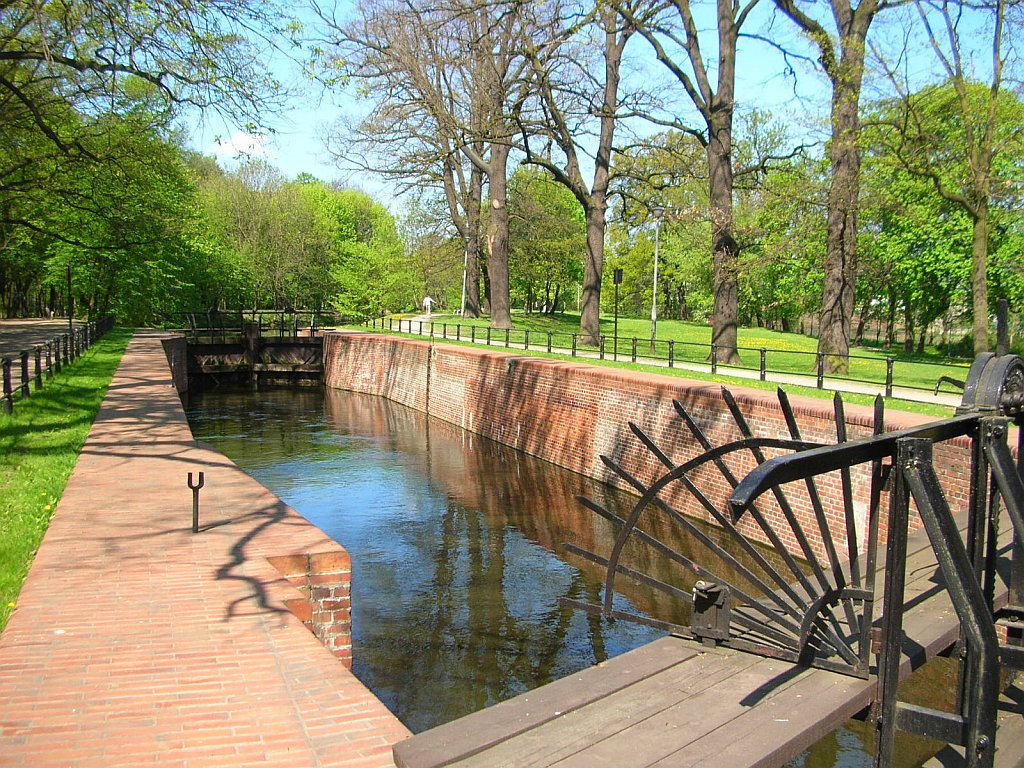
Czarna Droga Lock of the Bydgoszcz Canal

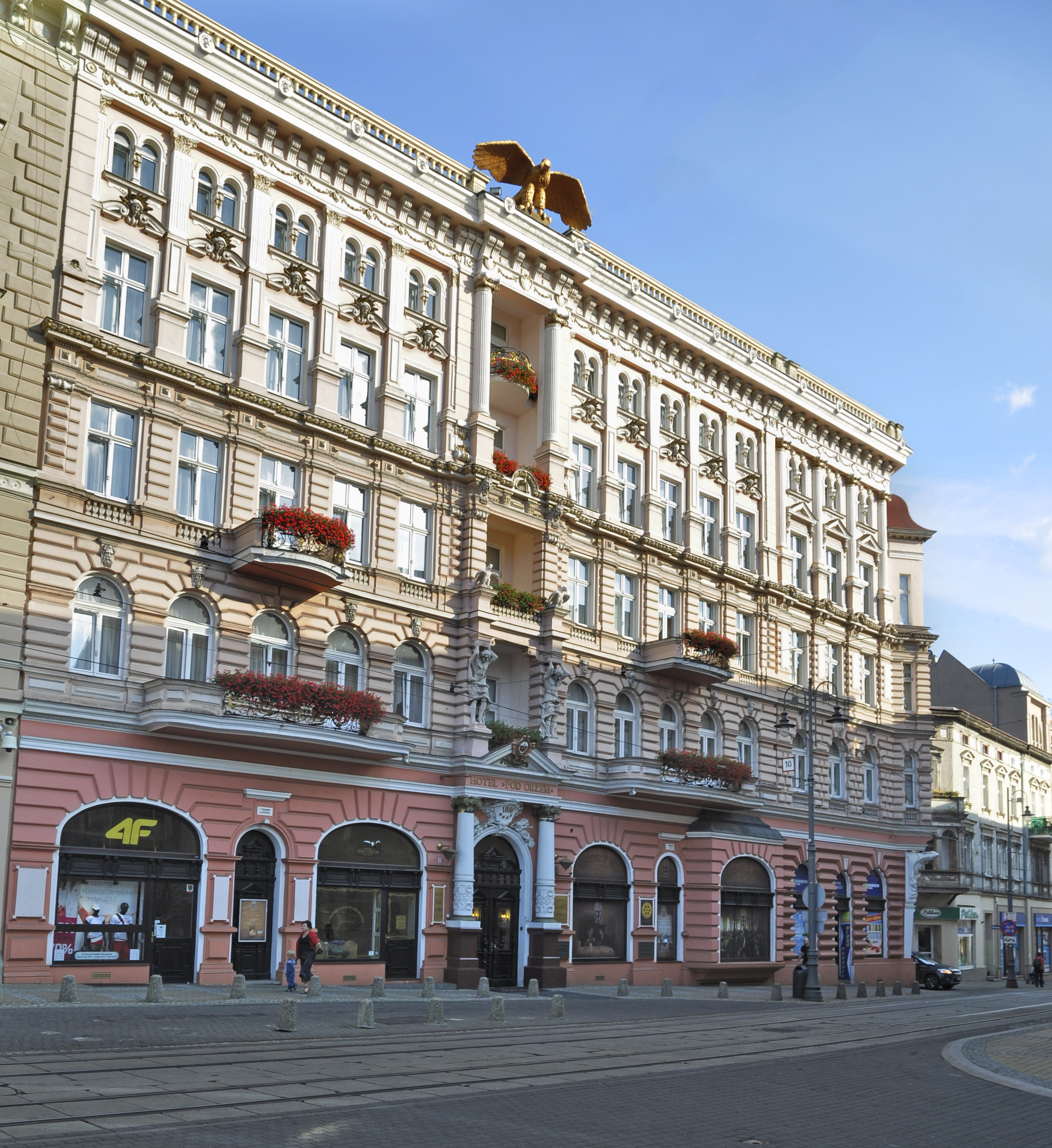
Bydgoszcz 19th century "The Eagle Hotel"

== See also ==
- Kuyavian dialect
- Kuyavian Pyramids, enormous tombs, megalithic structures
- Duchy of Greater Poland
- Duchy of Masovia
- History of Poland during the Piast dynasty
