= Duchy of Bydgoszcz and Wyszogród =

Former monarchy in Europe

Duchy of Bydgoszcz and Wyszogród Księstwo bydgosko-wyszogrodzkie (Polish) Ducatus Bidgostiensis et Wyszogrodiensis (Latin)
- 1314/1315–1323
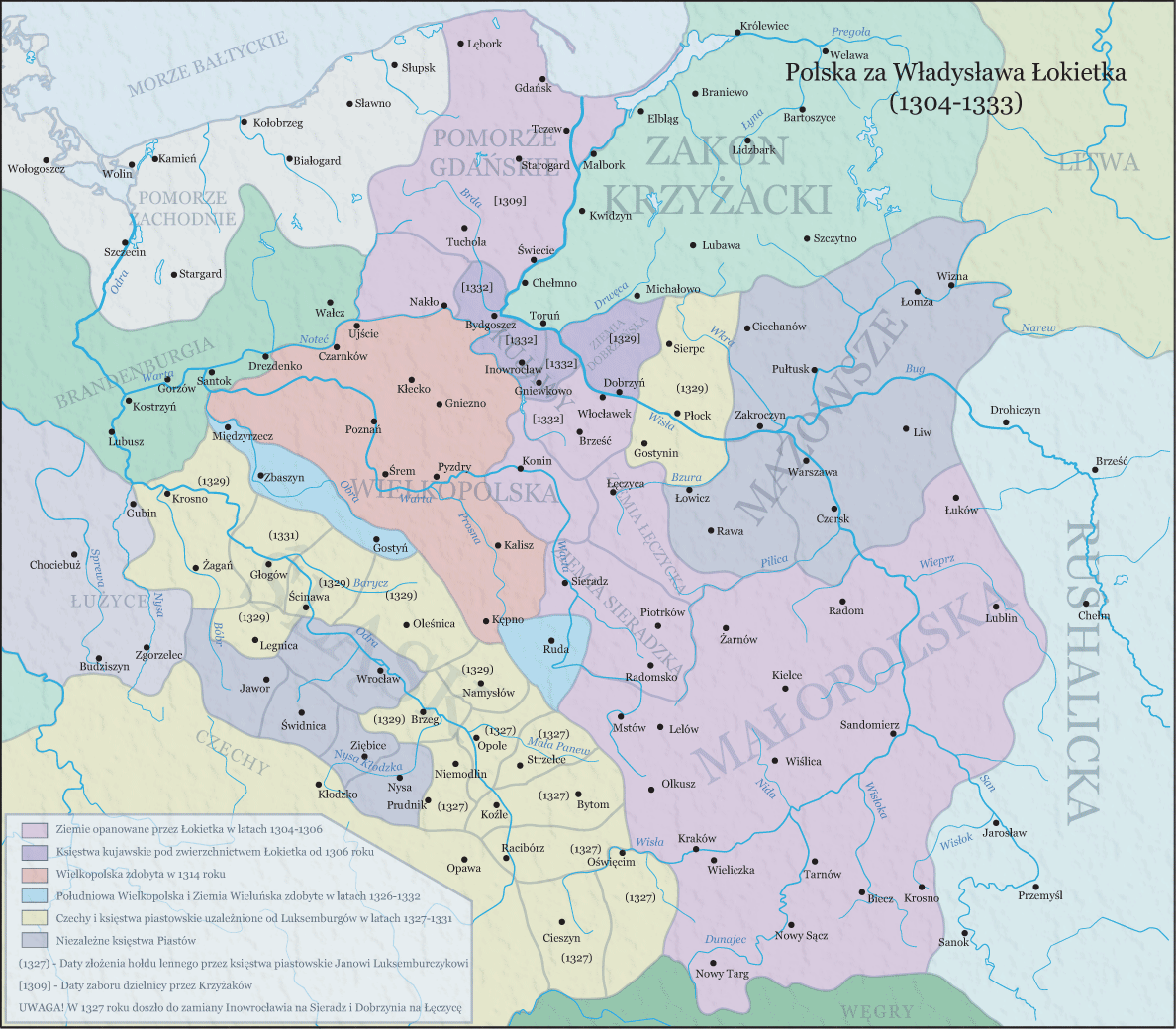
- Location of the Duchy of Bydgoszcz and Wyszogród within the borders of the Kingdom of Poland in years 1304–1333.
- Status: Fiefdom of Kingdom of Poland
- Capital: Bydgoszcz; Wyszogród
- Official languages: Polish, Latin
- Religion: Roman Catholic
- Government: District principality
- Duke
  - 1314/1315–1323: Przemysł of Inowrocław
- Historical era: High Middle Ages
  - Separation from the Duchy of Inowrocław: 1314/1315
  - Incorporation into Duchy of Inowrocław: 1323
Preceded by	Succeeded by
Duchy of Inowrocław	Duchy of Inowrocław

The Duchy of Bydgoszcz and Wyszogród (Note: Polish: Księstwo bydgosko-wyszogrodzkie; Latin: Ducatus Bidgostiensis et Wyszogrodiensis) was a district principality and a fiefdom within the Kingdom of Poland during the era of fragmentation. It was formed between 1314 and 1315 from part of the Duchy of Inowrocław, and existed until 1323 when it was incorporated back into it. The country was located in the Kuyavia centered around its co-capitals: Bydgoszcz and Wyszogród. Its only ruler was the duke Przemysł of Inowrocław of the Piast dynasty.

== History ==
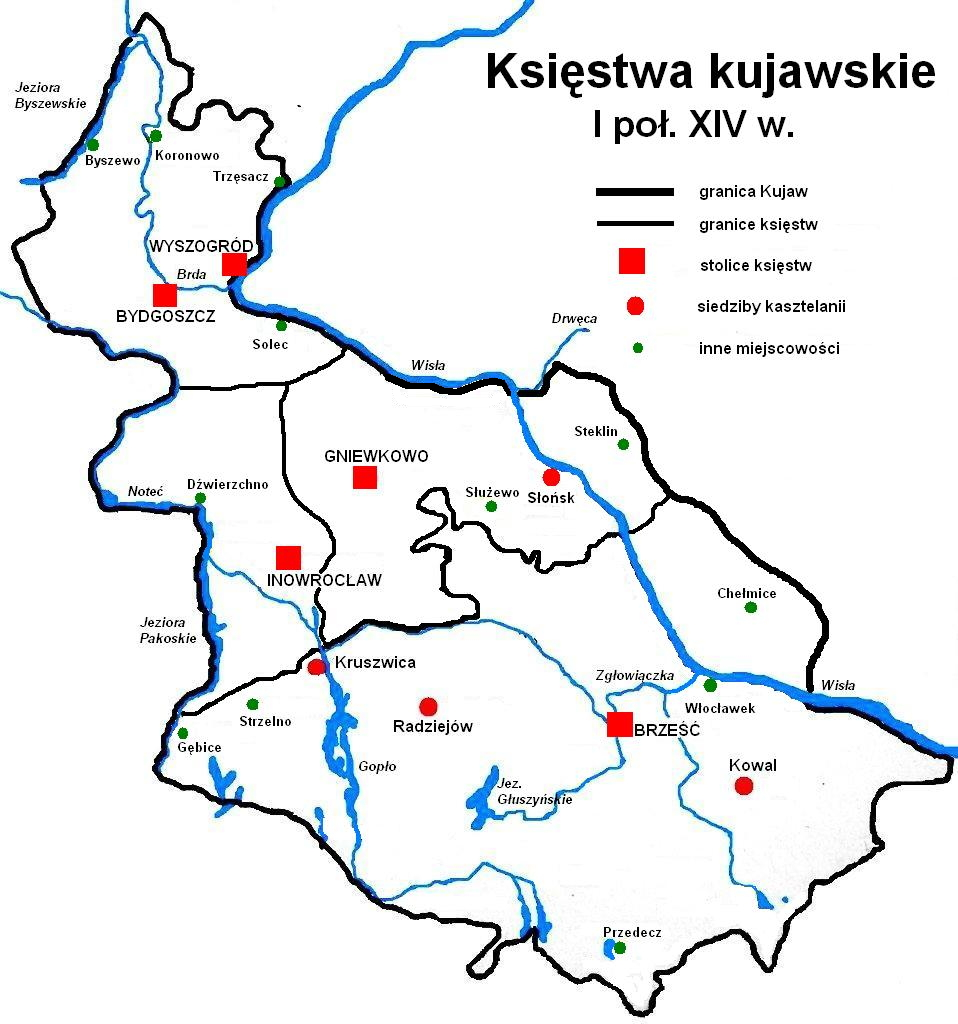
Map of duchies in the Kuyavia in the 14th century, including Duchy of Bydgoszcz and Wyszogród.

Duchy was formed between 12 November 1314 and 6 April 1315, with the partition of the Duchy of Inowrocław that was co-ruled by brothers, Leszek and Przemysł of Inowrocław. Leszek stayed the ruler of remaining lands of Inowrocław while Przemysł was given Bydgoszcz and Wyszogród. The country was located in the Kuyavia centered around its capitals: Bydgoszcz and Wyszogród and formed from the territories castellanies of Bydgoszcz and Wyszogród. 6 April 1315 marks the first mantion in the records of Przemysł as a duke of the state.

On 27 June 1315 near Kraków, Przemysł had joined the alliance of Władysław I Łokietek together with Denmark, Sweden, Rügen, Pomerania-Stettin, Pomerania-Wolgast and Mecklenburg, against the Margraviate of Brandenburg. On 11 June 1318, Leszek and Przemysł had signed the survival agreement, according to which, after the death of one of them, the other was going to inherit their territories.

In 1323, Leszek had abdicated and left Kuyiavia, with Przemysł succeeding his throne and uniting his both states into Duchy of Inowrocław.

== List of rulers ==
- Przemysł of Inowrocław (1314/1315–1323)
