= Duchy of Brześć Kujawski =

Polish duchy (1268–1332)

Duchy of Brześć Kujawski Księstwo brzesko-kujawskie (Polish) Ducatus Brestensis (Latin)
- 1268–1332
- Coat of arms

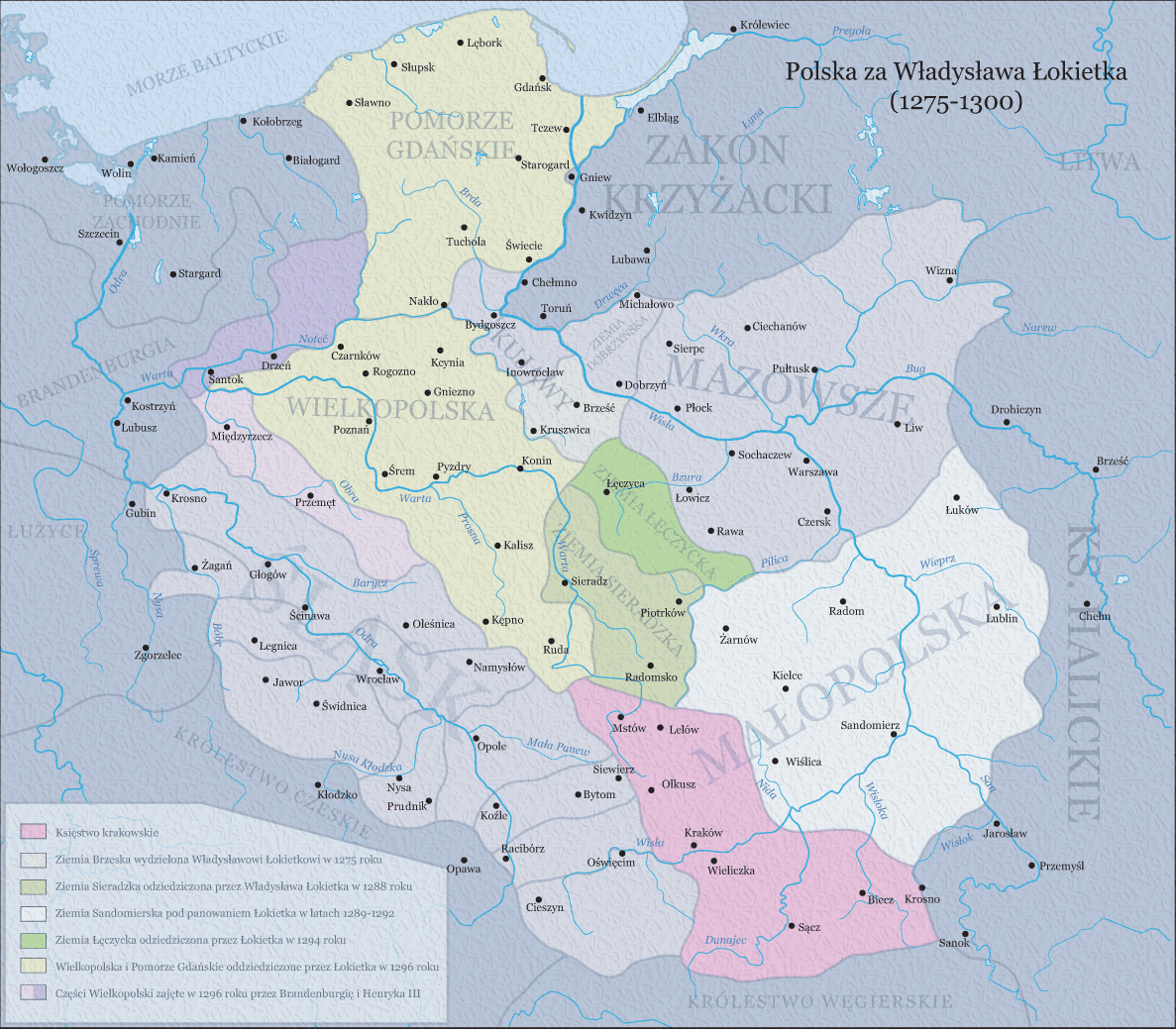
- Duchy of Brześć Kujawski within the Kingdom of Poland in 1300.
- Status: Independent state (1268–1300); Fiefdom within the Kingdom of Poland (1300–1320); Fielfdom within the United Kingdom of Poland.
- Capital: Brześć Kujawski
- Official languages: Polish, Latin
- Religion: Roman Catholic
- Government: District principality
- Duke
  - 1267–1288 (first): Władysław I Łokietek; Casimir II of Łęczyca; Siemowit of Dobrzyń
  - 1306–1332 (last): Władysław I Łokietek
- Historical era: High Middle Ages
  - Partition from the Duchy of Masovia: 3 January 1268
  - Incorporation into the State of the Teutonic Order: 21 April 1332
| Preceded by | Succeeded by |
| Duchy of Kuyavia | State of the Teutonic Order |
- Today part of: Poland

The Duchy of Brześć Kujawski, (Note: Polish: Księstwo brzesko-kujawskie; Latin: Ducatus Brestensis) also known as the Duchy of Kuyavian Brest, was a district principality in the Central Europe, in the region of Kuyavia. Its capital was Brześć Kujawski. It was formed on 3 January 1268 in the partition of the Duchy of Kuyavia. Its first ruler was duke Władysław I Łokietek of the Piast dynasty. The state was conquered by the State of the Teutonic Order in 1332, during Polish–Teutonic War, with its capitol being captured on 21 April. Until 1300, it was an independent state, after what, it had become a fiefdom within the Kingdom of Poland, that in 1320, got transformed into the United Kingdom of Poland.

== List of rulers ==
- Władysław I Łokietek, Casimir II of Łęczyca and Siemowit of Dobrzyń (1267–1288)
- Władysław I Łokietek (1288–1300)
- Wenceslaus II of Bohemia (1300–1305)
- Wenceslaus III of Bohemia (1305–1306)
- Władysław I Łokietek (1306–1332)

== Citations ==
=== Bibliography ===
- Jacek Osińsk, Bolesław Rodatka
- Marcin Hlebionek, Bolesław Pobożny
- Witold Mikołajczak, Wojny polsko-krzyżackie
- Piotr W. Lech, Pierwsza wojna polsko-krzyżacka 1308-1343
