= Netze District =

Territory in the Kingdom of Prussia, 1772–1807

Netze District Netzedistrikt (de) Obwód Nadnotecki (pl)
- Province of Prussia
- 1772–1807
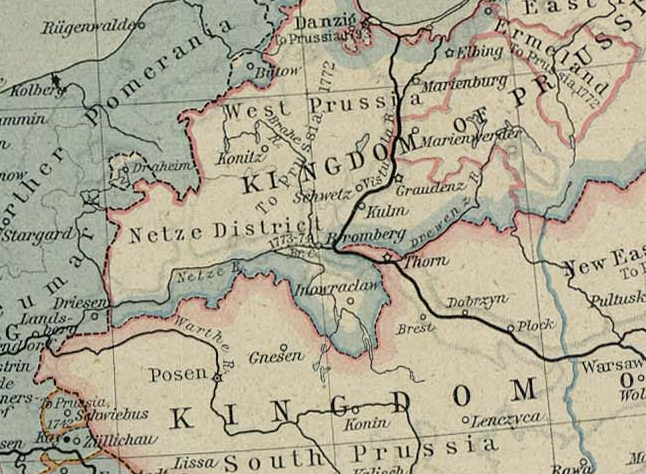
- Netze District in 1786
- Capital: Bydgoszcz (Bromberg)
- History
  - Split off Greater Poland: 1772
  - Attached to West Prussia: 1775
  - Partitioned: 1807
- Political subdivisions: Wałcz; Kamień; Bydgoszcz; Inowrocław
Preceded by
Poznań Voivodeship	Poznań Voivodeship (14th century–1793)
Gniezno Voivodeship	Gniezno Voivodeship
Inowrocław Voivodeship	Inowrocław Voivodeship
Succeeded by
Duchy of Warsaw
West Prussia	West Prussia
- Today part of: Poland

The Netze District or District of the Netze (German: Netzedistrikt or Netze-Distrikt; Polish: Obwód Nadnotecki) was a territory in the Kingdom of Prussia from 1772 until 1807. It included the urban centers of Bydgoszcz (Bromberg), Inowrocław (Inowraclaw), Piła (Schneidemühl) and Wałcz (Deutsch Krone) and was given its name for the Noteć River (German: Netze) that traversed it.

Beside Royal Prussia, a land of the Polish Crown since 1466, King Frederick II of Prussia also seized the adjacent lands of the Greater Poland Province to the south from the Polish–Lithuanian Commonwealth in the First Partition of Poland of 1772. At first Royal Prussia, i.e. the former Pomeranian, Malbork and Chełmno voivodeships, but with the exception of the former Prince-Bishopric of Warmia (became part of East Prussia), was organized as the province of West Prussia. On the other hand, the adjacent annexed areas of the Greater Polish Poznań and Gniezno Voivodeships, as well as of the Kuyavian lands of western Inowrocław Voivodeship along the Noteć (Netze) formed the separate Netze District under governor Franz Balthasar Schönberg von Brenkenhoff.

Von Brenkenhoff however soon was accused of the waste of public funds in the course of the construction of the Bydgoszcz Canal, and from 1775 onwards the Netze District was administered with West Prussia. With the 1793 Second Partition of Poland, the remainder of the Greater Polish province was annexed by Prussia and formed the new province of South Prussia. After the Prussian defeat in the War of the Fourth Coalition and the Greater Poland Uprising, large parts of the southern Netze District according to the 1807 Treaties of Tilsit fell to the Bydgoszcz Department of the Duchy of Warsaw. The remaining northwestern territory around Wałcz and Kamień was incorporated into the West Prussian province.

At the Congress of Vienna in 1815, the demarcation line was confirmed as the northern border of the newly established Grand Duchy of Posen. The southern territories of the former Netze District were administered within the Bromberg Region (Polish: Rejencja), while the northwestern part belonged to the West Prussian of Marienwerder Region (Kwidzyn).

== See also ==
- Polish Partitions
- West Prussia
- South Prussia
