= Duchy of Kuyavia =

Polish duchy (1230–1267)

Duchy of Kuyavia Księstwo kujawskie (Polish) Ducatus Cuiaviensis (Latin)
- 1230–1267
- Coat of arms

- Duchy of Kuyavia within Kingdom of Poland in 13th century.
- Status: Independent state
- Capital: Inowrocław
- Official languages: Polish, Latin
- Religion: Roman Catholic
- Government: District principality
- Duke
  - 1233–1267: Casimir I of Kuyavia
- Historical era: High Middle Ages
  - Separation from the Duchy of Masovia: 1230
  - Partition into duchies of Inowrocław and Brześć Kujawski: 1267
Preceded by
Duchy of Masovia
Succeeded by
Duchy of Inowrocław
Duchy of Brześć Kujawski
Duchy of Łęczyca
Duchy of Sieradz
- Today part of: Poland

The Duchy of Kuyavia (Note: Polish: Księstwo kujawskie; Latin: Ducatus Cuiaviensis) was a district principality in Central Europe, created in the course of the 13th century in the region of modern-day Kuyavia after the inheritance of the Kingdom of Poland in 1138 into partial duchies through the will and testament of Duke Bolesław III Wrymouth.

== History ==
Located between the regions of Greater Poland and Mazovia, Kuyavia was the tribal area of the Goplans (Latin Glopeani, which roughly means "residents of Lake Gopło") with the political center in Kruszwica. Kuyavia was connected to Greater Poland from the 10th century, and to the Duchy of Masovia from 1138. In 1231, the duchies of Sieradz and Łęczyca, had been formed from a part of the state. In 1233 it became an independent duchy under Duke Casimir I, which, due to further divisions of inheritance (1267 and 1314), fragmented into the sub-duchies of Brześć, Inowrocław and Gniewkowo. After the unification of part of the Polish duchies to form the Kingdom of Poland under King Władysław I Łokietek, it lost its sovereignty after 1306 and became its vassal. In the Polish–Teutonic War, the sparsely populated area of the duchy came under the Teutonic Order in 1332. The Teutonic Order returned the duchy to the Polish crown in the Peace Treaty of Kalisz (1343).

The duchy was confiscated as a settled fiefdom by the Polish crown towards the end of the 14th century and was given direct administrative control in the kingdom in the course of the 15th century in the form of two incorporated voivodships (with seats in Brześć Kujawski and Inowrocław with a joint local state parliament (Sejmik) in Radziejów). The area belonged to Poland until the Partitions (1772, 1793, 1795).

In the following centuries, the memory of the duchy was only preserved in the names of the voivodeships and in the titulary of the Polish rulers. King Władysław II Jagiełło claimed the following territories in his title:

Wladislaus dei gracia Rex Polonie, nec non terrarum Cracovie, Sandomirie, Siradie, Lancicie, Cuyauie, Lituanie princeps supremus, Pomeranie, Russieque dominus et heres, etc.

== List of rulers ==
- Casimir I of Kuyavia (ca. 1211–1267), Duke of Kuyavia, Sieradz and Łęczyca;
- Ziemomysł of Kuyavia (ca. 1246–1287), Duke of Kuyavia in Inowrocław;
- Władysław I Łokietek (ca. 1260–1333), Duke of Kuyavia in Brześć, King of Poland from 1320 to 1333;
- Kazimierz III of Gniewkowo (ca. 1280–1347), Duke of Kuyavia in Gniewkowo;
- Władysław the White (ca. 1327–1388), Duke of Kuyavia in Gniewkowo;
- Vladislaus II of Opole (ca. 1326–1401), Duke of Kuyavia and Opole;

== Citations ==
=== Bibliography ===
- Dariusz Karczewski, Książę Kazimierz Konradowiec i Kujawy jego czasów.
- Błażej Śliwiński, Leszek, książe inowrocławski.
- Józef Śliwiński, Władysław Biały.
- S. Zajączkowski, Studia nad terytorialnym formowaniem ziemi łęczyckiej i sieradzkiej, Łódź, 1951.
