= Duchy of Inowrocław =

Polish duchy (1267–1364)

Duchy of Inowrocław Księstwo inowrocławskie (pl)
- 1267–1364
- Coat of arms

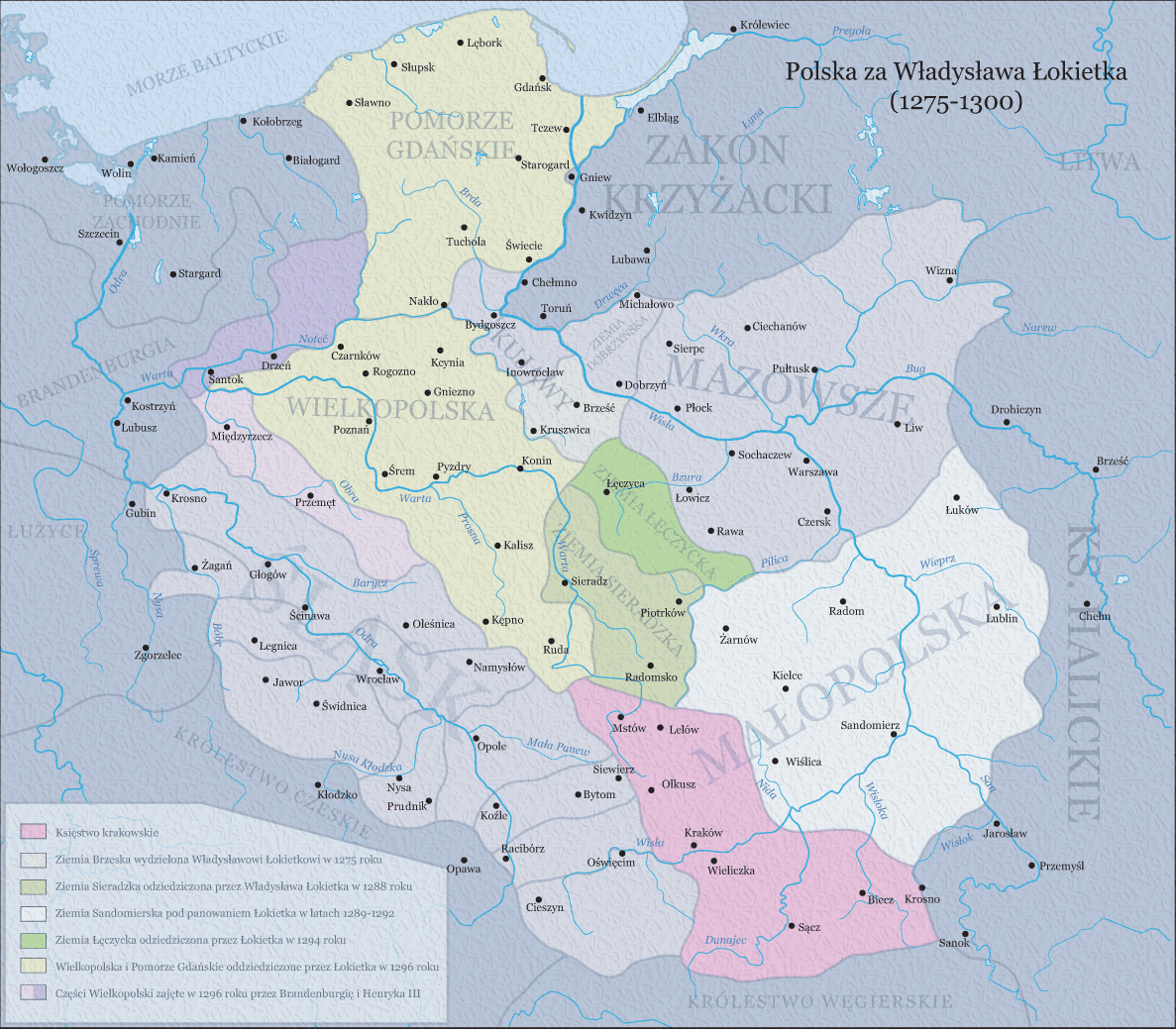
- Duchy of Inowrocław within Kingdom of Poland between 1275 and 1300.
- Status: Province of Poland; Fiefdom of the Polish Crown (from 1300)
- Capital: Inowrocław
- Religion: Roman Catholic
- Government: Duchy
- Historical era: High Middle Ages
  - Split of Duchy of Kujavia after Casimir I's death: 1267
  - Vassalized by Kingdom of Poland: 1300
  - Occupation by Teutonic Order: 1332–1337
  - Incorporated by the Polish Crown: 1364
Preceded by	Succeeded by
Duchy of Kuyavia	Inowrocław Voivodeship; Duchy of Gniewkowo
- Today part of: Poland

The Duchy of Inowrocław (Polish: Księstwo Inowrocławskie) was one of the territories created during the period of the fragmentation of Poland. It was originally part of the Duchy of Kuyavia, but was separated by Ziemomysł and Władysław I the Elbow-high, upon the death of Duke Casimir I in 1267.

The Inowrocław Voivodeship was established on the territory of duchy in 1364.

== Dukes of Inowrocław ==
- 1267–1287 Ziemomysł of Kuyavia
- 1287–1320/24 Leszek of Kuyavia, son
- 1287–1314 Przemysł of Sieradz, younger brother, with Leszek
  - 1320/24-1327 Przemysł of Sieradz, again
- 1327–1333 Władysław I the Elbow-high, brother of Ziemomysł of Kuyavia
- 1333-1370 Casimir III the Great, son
- 1370-1377 Casimir IV, Duke of Pomerania, adopted son
- 1378-1392 Władysław Opolczyk, great-grandson of Władysław I the Elbow-high

== Sources ==
- (in Polish) Inowrocław is the pearl of Kujawy
