= 1373 =

1373 in various calendars
- Gregorian calendar: 1373; MCCCLXXIII
- Ab urbe condita: 2126
- Armenian calendar: 822; ԹՎ ՊԻԲ
- Assyrian calendar: 6123
- Balinese saka calendar: 1294–1295
- Bengali calendar: 779–780
- Berber calendar: 2323
- English Regnal year: 46 Edw. 3 – 47 Edw. 3
- Buddhist calendar: 1917
- Burmese calendar: 735
- Byzantine calendar: 6881–6882
- Chinese calendar: 壬子年 (Water Rat); 4070 or 3863 — to — 癸丑年 (Water Ox); 4071 or 3864
- Coptic calendar: 1089–1090
- Discordian calendar: 2539
- Ethiopian calendar: 1365–1366
- Hebrew calendar: 5133–5134
- Hindu calendars
- Vikram Samvat: 1429–1430
- Shaka Samvat: 1294–1295
- Kali Yuga: 4473–4474
- Holocene calendar: 11373
- Igbo calendar: 373–374
- Iranian calendar: 751–752
- Islamic calendar: 774–775
- Japanese calendar: Ōan 6 (応安６年)
- Javanese calendar: 1286–1287
- Julian calendar: 1373; MCCCLXXIII
- Korean calendar: 3706
- Minguo calendar: 539 before ROC 民前539年
- Nanakshahi calendar: −95
- Thai solar calendar: 1915–1916
- Tibetan calendar: ཆུ་ཕོ་བྱི་བ་ལོ་ (male Water-Rat); 1499 or 1118 or 346 — to — ཆུ་མོ་གླང་ལོ་ (female Water-Ox); 1500 or 1119 or 347

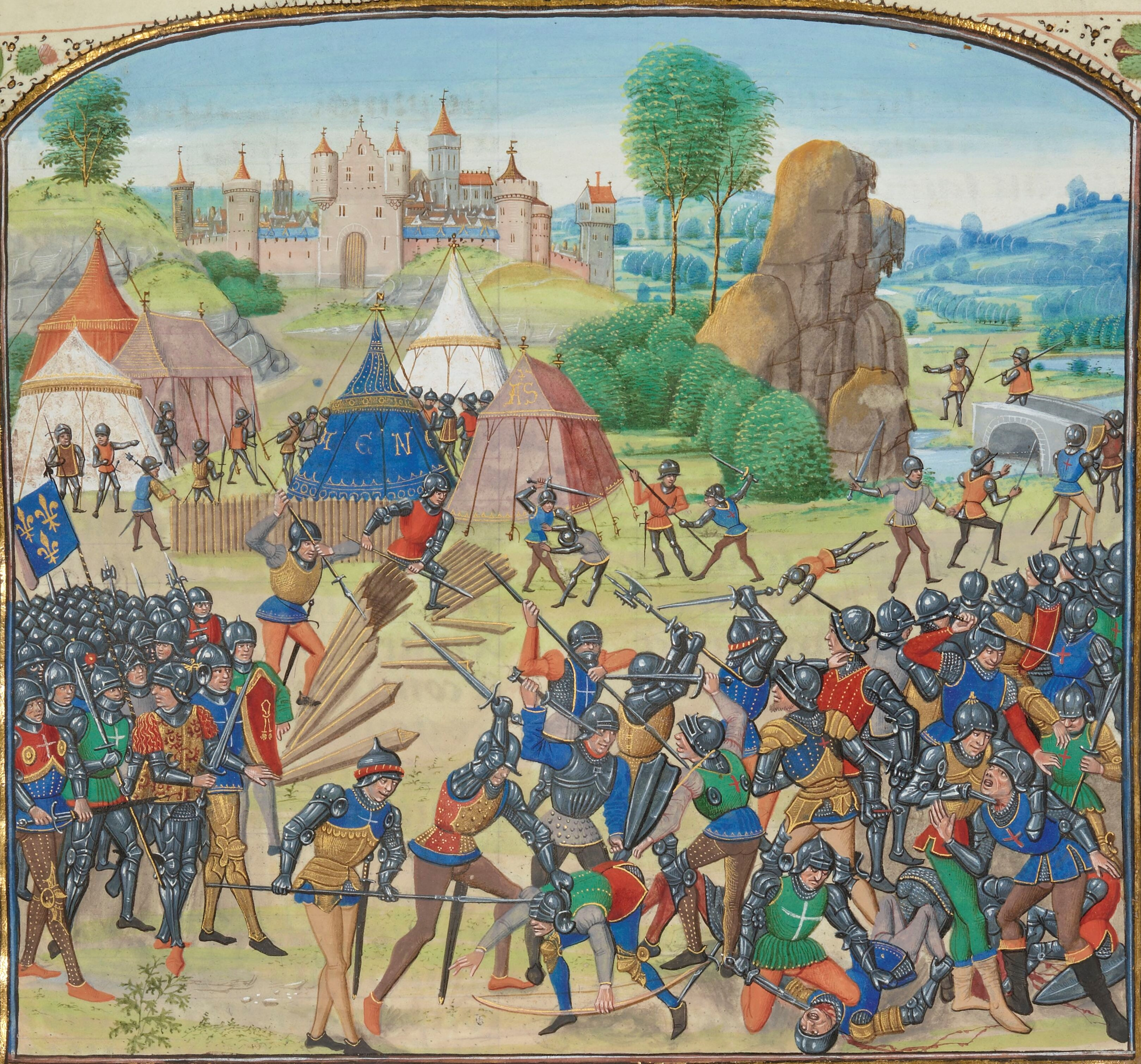
March 21: French troops overwhelm English attackers at the Battle of Chiset.

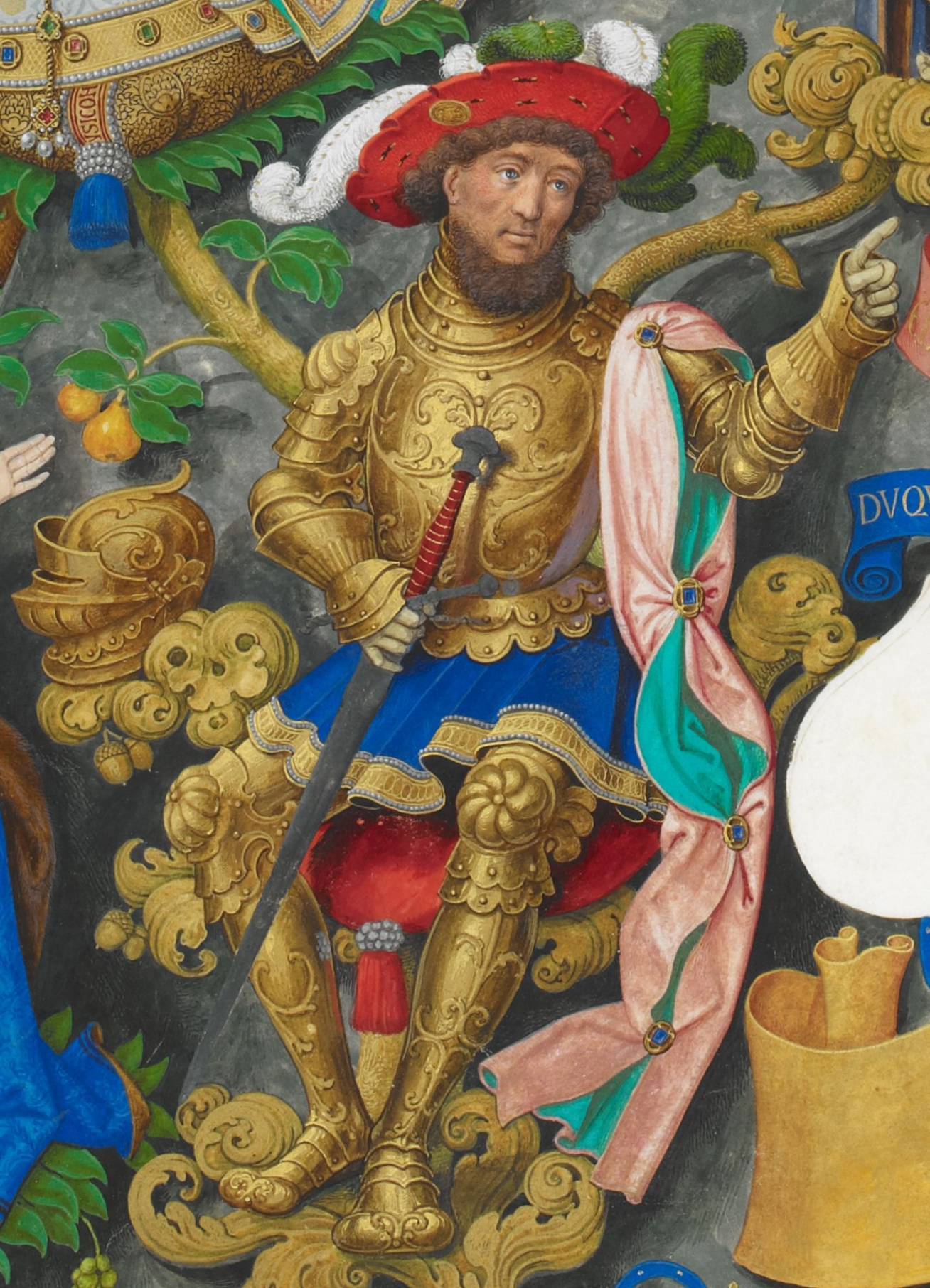
August 4: England's John of Gaunt leads 15,000 men on destructive march through France toward Burgundy.

Year 1373 (MCCCLXXIII) was a common year starting on Saturday of the Julian calendar.

== Events ==
=== January–March ===
- January 13 – King Charles VI of France issues an ordinance to reform the kingdom's defense forces, with a goal of improving efficiency and discipline. For the first time, captains of regiments of soldiers are required to pay their men directly and report the accounting to their superiors, who are required to audit the reports. Previously, the captains pocketed the wages and allowed their men "to pay themselves by pillage."
- January 15 – Majorie Castle in Switzerland becomes the official residence of the Roman Catholic Prince-bishop of Sion, Guichard Tavelli, and the bishops that follow.
- February 16 – King Edward III of England appoints Lord Salisbury to command a fleet of English and Genoese galleys and 1,700 soldiers to fight in the Duchy of Brittany.
- March 7 – Second Ferdinand War: The Battle of Lisbon is fought off the coast of the capital of the Kingdom of Portugal. The attack by the Crown of Castile, by 12 galleys led by Ambrosio Boccanegra, disperses the 21 ships of the defending Portuguese navy (led by Lanzarote Pessanha, and leaves Lisbon open to capture and pillaging by the Castilian invaders.
- March 21 – The Battle of Chiset is fought between France and England near what is now Chizé in Deux-Sèvres département in France. The French force of 1,500 defenders, led by Bertrand du Guesclin overwhelms 700-man English force led by Baron Devereux, who is taken prisoner of war.
- March 24 – The Treaty of Santarém is signed between Ferdinand I of Portugal and Henry II of Castile, ending the second war between the two countries.
- March 31 – The Treaty of Villeneuve, signed on August 20, 1372 to settle the dispute between the Capetian House of Anjou and the House of Barcelona over rule of the Kingdom of Sicily, is ratified by Queen Giovanna of Naples (for Anjou), acknowledging the loss of Sicily to King Frederick the Simple of Sicily of the House of Barcelona.

=== April–June ===
- April 28 – Hundred Years' War: The French re-capture most of Brittany from the English, but are unable to take Brest, and John IV, Duke of Brittany, is forced into exile.
- May 6 – Byzantine co-emperor Andronikos IV Palaiologos allies with Savcı Bey, the son of the Ottoman Sultan Murad I, rebels against his father, John V Palaiologos, for agreeing to let Constantinople become a vassal of the Ottoman Empire, but the rebellion fails.
- May 7 – The troops of the Papal States and of the county of Savoy and the French mercenary Enguerrand VII de Coucy, defeat the Visconti, rulers of the Lordship of Milan in the Battle of Montichiari and stop Milan's attempts to expand its empire within Italy.
- May 13 – The English anchoress, Dame Julian of Norwich receives the 16 Revelations of Divine Love from God while seriously ill.
- May 17 – The dukes of the various duchies of Pomerania, enter into an alliance in a meeting at Kaseburg (now Karsibor in Poland) to resist the expansion of the neighboring state of Brandenburg.
- May 30 – Andronikos IV is arrested, imprisoned, and blinded in one eye on orders of his father, the Emperor John V Palaiologos, who was directed by Sultan Murad to carry out the punishment.Savci, who was completely blinded, is executed on orders of Murad, his father. After the rebellion fails, Ottoman Emperor Murad I commands to blind his son.
- June 12 – John of Gaunt's chevauchée of 1373: King Edward III appoints John of Gaunt, Duke of Lancaster as his captain-general in the war in France and sends him with a large army across the English Channel to Calais.
- June 16 – The Anglo-Portuguese Treaty is signed in London, and is the oldest active treaty in the world.

=== July–September ===
- July 1 – Marquard of Randeck, Prince-Bishop of Augsburg, who had joined an alliance in a war against the Republic of Venice, is defeated in the Battle of Fossa Nuova, near Treviso, after the Doge of Venice, Andrea Contarini, hired Turkish mercenaries. Randeck is forced to negotiate surrender terms and sign a peace treaty.
- August 4 – Hundred Years' War: John of Gaunt launches a new invasion of France, setting out with 15,000 men from Calais and marching through Picardy, Champagne and Burgundy, "burning and destroying as he advanced
- August 8 – Bristol perambulation: Bristol is made a county corporate, the first town in he Kingdom of England outside London to be granted this status.
- August 18 – The Treaty of Fürstenwalde is concluded between the Holy Roman Empire and the Margravate of Brandenburg, as the Margrave Otto V abdicates the throne and sells Brandenburg to the Holy Roman Emperor in return for several castles and towns in the Upper Palatinate 500,000 imperial guilders (1,900 kg or almost 68,000 ounces of gold) as Margrave of Brandenburg
- September 9 – Władysław the White (Władysław Biały), formerly the Duke of Gniewkowo begins a rebellion against the Kingdom of Poland in an attempt to become the kingdom's monarch rather than the King of Hungary. He begins an attempt to reestablish his duchy, capturing Gniewkowo, Włocławek, Inowrocław and Złotoria, but ultimately fails after he flees to Zlotoria in 1376 and is besieged there, surrendering in 1377.
- September 12 –, The German prince-bishop Marquard of Randeck signs a peace treaty with the Republic of Venice, forfeiting all territory recaptured during the war, with the exception of Feltre and Belluno.
- September 25 – At Constantinople, Manuel II Palaiologos is proclaimed as co-Emperor of Byzantium by his father, the Emperor John V Palaiologos.

=== October–December ===
- October 2 – Wenzel of Luxembourg, son of Charles IV, Holy Roman Emperor, is installed by the Empire as the new Margrave of Brandenburg, ending the war with Pomerania and entering into an alliance with the Pomeranian dukes.Buchholz (1999), p.161
- November 21 – King Edward III opens the English Parliament at Westminster and demands more money to be raised to continue the war with France.
- November 25 – Philip II, Prince of Taranto hands over the rule of Achaea (modern-day southern Greece) to his cousin, Joanna I of Naples.
- December 21 – The Parliament of England ends its session after 20 days and royal assent is given to measures passed therein, including an act setting "the length and breadth of cloth of ray, and cloth of colour", and setting the exchange rate for a Scottish groat as three English pence.

=== Date unknown ===
- Louis I of Hungary takes Severin again, but the Vlachs will recover it in 1376–1377.
- Constantine IV, ruler of the Armenian Kingdom of Cilicia (modern-day southern Turkey), is assassinated; he is succeeded by his distant cousin Leo V.
- A city wall is built around Lisbon, Portugal to resist invasion by Castile.
- Merton College Library is built in Oxford, England.
- The Adina Mosque is built in Bengal.
- The Chinese emperor of the Ming dynasty, the Hongwu Emperor, suspends the traditional civil service examination system after complaining that the 120 new jinshi degree-holders are too incompetent to hold office; he instead relies solely upon a system of recommendations, until the civil service exams are reinstated in 1384.

== Births ==
- March 29 – Marie d'Alençon, French princess (d. 1417)
- June 25 – Queen Joanna II of Naples (d. 1435)
- September 22 – Thomas le Despenser, 1st Earl of Gloucester (d. 1400)
- date unknown
  - Edward of Norwich, 2nd Duke of York (d. 1415)
  - Margery Kempe, writer of the first autobiography in English

== Deaths ==
- January 16 – Humphrey de Bohun, 7th Earl of Hereford (b. 1342)
- February – Ibn Kathir, Mamluk Islamic scholar (b. 1301)
- July 23 – Saint Birgitta, Swedish saint (b. 1303)
- November 3 – Jeanne de Valois, Queen of Navarre (b. 1343)
- December 7 – Rafał of Tarnów, Polish nobleman (b. c. 1330)
- date unknown
  - Constantine IV, King of Armenia (assassinated)
  - Robert le Coq, French bishop and councillor
  - Tiphaine Raguenel, Breton astrologer (b. c. 1335)
