= Siege of Złotoria =

- Part of Władysław the White's rebellion
Date	1 June 1376 – 1377
Location	Złotoria Castle, Złotoria
Result	Polish victory; Władysław the White's resignation of his clams to Polish throne and lands of Duchy of Gniewkowo; End of the war

Belligerents
Kingdom of Poland; Pomerania-Stolp; Duchy of Wieluń	Władysław the White's forces Duchy of Gniewkowo

Commanders and leaders
Sędziwój Pałuka; Casimir IV	Władysław the White

Siege of Złotoria (Note: Polish: oblężenie Złotorii) was a siege of the castle in Złotoria, during Władysław the White's rebellion, that lasted from 1 June 1376 to early 1377. It was fought between fortified rebel forces of Władysław the White, duke of the Duchy of Gniewkowo, against attacking forces of Kingdom of Poland led by Sędziwój Pałuka, and Pomerania-Stolp led by Casimir IV. The siege ended in early 1377, with the capitulation of the castle and rebel forces, ending the war.

== The siege ==
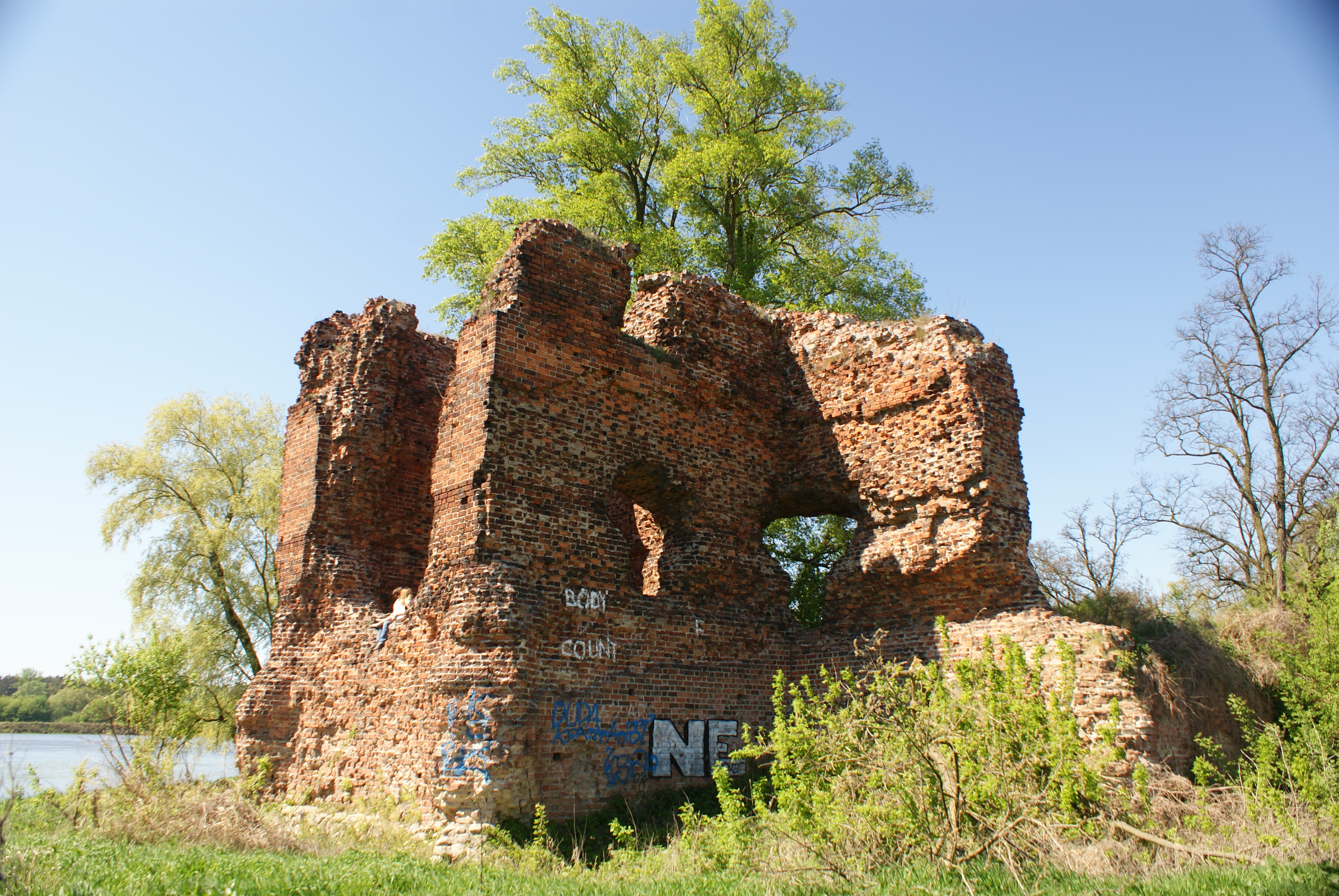
Ruins of the tower of Złotoria Castle in 2009.

Following the defeat in battle of Gniewkowo, in 1375, remaining forces of Władysław the White had retreated to the Złotoria Castle, located in the village of Złotoria, where they fortified. On 1 June 1376, forces of Kingdom of Poland led by Sędziwój Pałuka had begun the siege of the castle. Before the war, the castle belonged to Casimir IV, duke of the Pomerania-Stolp who fought in the battle on the Polish side. In June 1376, he got injured in the head. The injury eventually led to his death on 2 January 1377. In the spring of 1376, Vladislaus II of Opole had sent his knights to join forces led by Sędziwój Pałuka against Władysław the White. At the beginning of 1377, Władysław had capitulated the castle. Following that, he had challenged Bartosz Wezenborg to a duel, which he lost and during which he got injured.

== Bibliography ==
- Rodowód Piastów małopolskich i kujawskich by K. Jasiński. Poznań–Wrocław. 2001. ISBN 83-913563-5-3.
- Piastowie. Leksykon biograficzny by S. Szczur and K. Ożog. Kraków. 1999. ISBN 83-08-02829-2.
- Władysław Biały. Ostatni Książę Kujawski by Józef Śliwiński. Kraków. 2017. ISBN 978-83-7730-250-7.
- Rodowód książąt pomorskich by E. Rymar. Szczecin. Pomeranian Library. 2005. ISBN 83-87879-50-9, OCLC 69296056.
- Ziemia Dobrzyńska: Zeszyty Historyczne Dobrzyńskiego Oddziału WTN, vol. 6 by Mirosław Krajewski. Rypin. Dobrzyński Oddział Włocławskiego Towarzystwa Naukowego. 1999. p. 35-36.
