= Duchy of Gniewkowo =

Former monarchy in Europe

Duchy of Gniewkowo Księstwo gniewkowskie (Polish) Ducatus Gnewkovie (Latin)
- 1314–1332; 1343–1363/1364; 1373–1374; 1375–1377
- Coat of arms

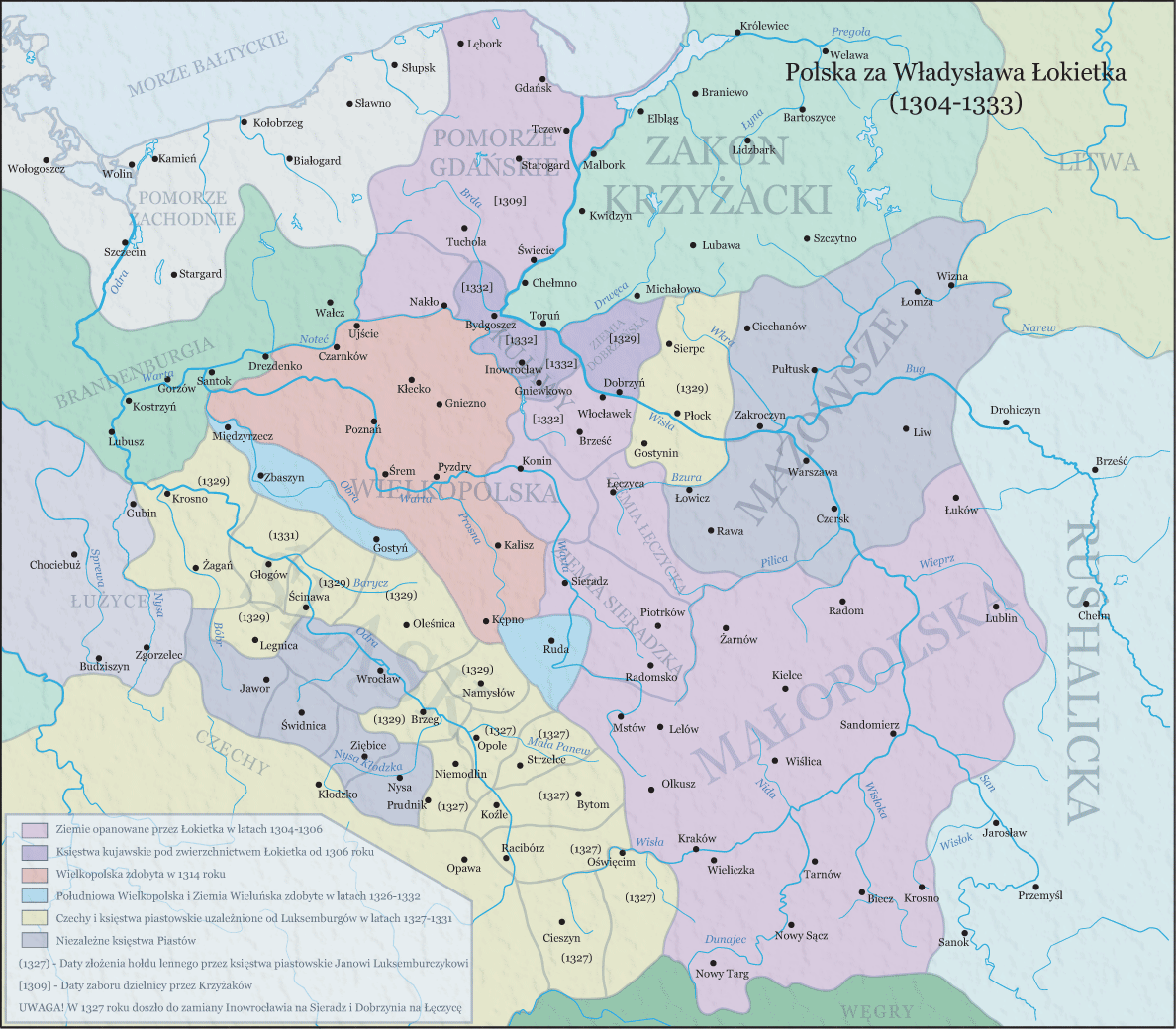
- Location of the Duchy of Gniewkowo within the borders of the Kingdom of Poland in years 1304–1333.
- Status: Fiefdom of Kingdom of Poland (1314–1332, 1343–1363/1364); Unrecognised state (1373–1374, 1375–1377)
- Capital: Gniewkowo (de facto 1314–1332, 1373–1374, 1375, de jure: 1314–1332, 1343–1363/1364, 1373–1374, 1375); Szarlej (de facto 1343–1363/1364)
- Official languages: Polish, Latin
- Religion: Roman Catholic
- Government: District principality
- Duke
  - 1314–1332, 1343–1347/1350 (first): Kazimierz III of Gniewkowo
  - 1347/1350–1363/1364, 1373–1374, 1375–1377 (last): Władysław the White
- Historical era: High Middle Ages
  - Separation from the Duchy of Inowrocław: 1314
  - Conquest of the state by State of the Teutonic Order: 1332
  - Reestablishment of the state: 1343
  - Incorporation into the Kingdom of Poland: 1363/1364
  - Władysław the White's rebellion: 8 September 1373
  - Władysław the White's resignation from his claims to the region: March 1377
Preceded by
Duchy of Inowrocław
State of the Teutonic Order
Kingdom of Poland
Succeeded by
State of the Teutonic Order
Kingdom of Poland

The Duchy of Gniewkowo (Note: Polish: Księstwo gniewkowskie; Latin: Ducatus Gnewkovie) was a district principality and a fiefdom within the Kingdom of Poland during the era of fragmentation that was formed in 1314 from part of the Duchy of Inowrocław. The country was located in the Kuyavia and consisted of Gniewkowo and Słońsk Lands. Its capital was Gniewkowo and other important settlements were Szarlej, Złotoria and Słońsk. It was ruled by Kazimierz III of Gniewkowo and later his son, Władysław the White, from the Piast dynasty. In 1332 the duchy was conquered by the State of the Teutonic Order and was reestablished in 1343. Between 1363 and 1364, the duchy was incorporated into the Kingdom of Poland. Duke of Gniewkowo, Władysław the White, had later briefly re-established the duchy in the rebellion fought between 1373 and 1374 and later between 1375 and 1377, and eventually given up his claims to the land in 1377.

== History ==
=== Reign of Kazimierz III of Gniewkowo ===
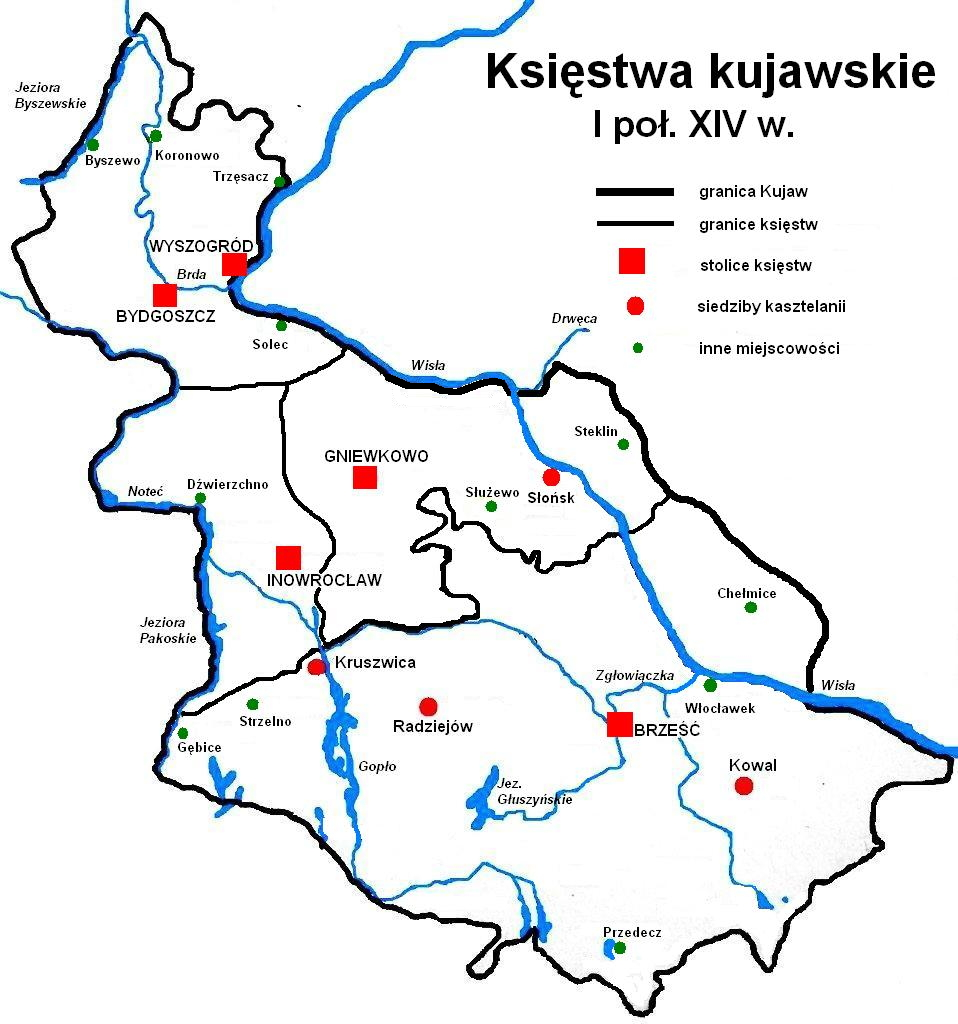
Map of duchies in the Kuyavia in the 14th century, including Duchy of Gniekowo.

Duchy of Gniewkowo was formed in 1314 from part of the Duchy of Inowrocław. Its territories were given to Kazimierz III of Gniewkowo by his father, Ziemomysł of Kuyavia, Duke of Inowrocław, in his testament. The county was located in the Kuyavia and consisted of Gniewkowo and Słońsk Lands. Its capital was Gniewkowo and other important settlements were Szarlej, Złotoria and Słońsk.

In 1332, during Polish–Teutonic War, forces of the State of the Teutonic Order laid the siege to Gniewkowo. Kazimierz III, knowing that he wasn't able to protect the city from falling into Teutonic control, burned down the city and left to exile. During the war, the Teutonic Order got control over the entire area of Kuyavia. In 1343, according to the Treaty of Kalisz, territories of the duchy were returned to Polish control, and Kazimierz III was reestablished as its ruler. As Gniewkowo got burned down during the war, Szarlej become the seat of the duke, and therefore, de facto capital of the state.

=== Reign of Władysław the White ===
Kazimierz III died between 1347 and 1350 and was succeeded by his son, Władysław the White. He kept positive relations with the State of the Teutonic Order and the king of Poland. In 1359, the duke married Elżbieta, daughter of Albert of Strzelce. With the marriage, he probably was given Inowrocław Land as his fiefdom from Casimir III the Great, the king of Poland, that before was part of the Duchy of Inowrocław. After the death of his wife between 1360 or 1361, the duke returned his fiefdom to the king. At the turn of 1363 and 1364, Władysław pawned the duchy to the king of Poland for the prize of 1000 florins. This decision probably was caused by the worsening relations with the king of Poland, who, during the border dispute between the duke and the Kuyavian judge Kiwała, ruled in favour of the latter.

=== The rebellion ===
In 1370, following the death of Casimir III the Great, Władysław the White had attempted to gain a right to succession of the throne of Poland, with the support of the Kuyavian and Greater Poland nobility opposed to the coronation of the Louis I of Hungary as the king. Despite that, he remained unsuccessful. On 8 September 1373, he arrived at Gniezno in disguise, and between 9 and 10 September, he conquered the territories of Duchy of Gniewkowo, including towns of Gniewkowo and Inowrocław; reestablishing the state and beginning the rebellion. Due to the more numerous forces of Louis I supporters led by Sędziwój Pałuka, the king's refusal to negotiate and lack of support in the rest of Kuyavia, by 1374 Władysław had retreated to Driesen, State of the Teutonic Order.

Władysław, supported by Ulrich von Osten and a few Burgundian military units of Philip the Bold, had invaded Kuyavia again in 1375. During the attack, Władysław's forces had gained control over the Gniewkowo as well as the castles in the villages of Złotoria and Raciążek. At this point, both sides of the conflict were better prepared than in 1373. One of the more important fights in the conflict was the battle of Gniewkowo, during which the royal side had a decisive victory. Later, Władysław's forces had retreated to the Złotoria Castle and became fortified, but faced a siege and were forced to capitulate. Following that, Władysław challenged Bartosz Wezenborg to a duel, which he lost and during which he got injured.

In March 1377, in the agreement signed in Brześć Kujawski, Władysław the White agreed to give up his claims to the throne of Poland and lands of the Duchy of Gniewkowo. In return, he was given 10 000 florins and the status of the Abbot Governator of Pannonhalma Archabbey.

== List of rulers ==
- Kazimierz III of Gniewkowo (1314–1332, 1343–1347/1350)
- Władysław the White (1347/1350–1363/1364, 1373–1374, 1375–1377)

== Bibliography ==
- Rodowód Piastów małopolskich i kujawskich by K. Jasiński. Poznań–Wrocław. 2001. ISBN 83-913563-5-3.
- Piastowie. Leksykon biograficzny by S. Szczur and K. Ożog. Kraków. 1999. ISBN 83-08-02829-2.
- Władysław Biały. Ostatni Książę Kujawski by Józef Śliwiński. Kraków. 2017. ISBN 978-83-7730-250-7.
- Jadwiga of Anjou and the Rise of East Central Europe by Oskar Halecki. Polish Institute of Arts and Sciences of America. 1991. ISBN 0-88033-206-9.
- Rodowód książąt pomorskich by E. Rymar. Szczecin. Pomeranian Library. 2005. ISBN 83-87879-50-9, OCLC 69296056.
- Ziemia Dobrzyńska: Zeszyty Historyczne Dobrzyńskiego Oddziału WTN, vol. 6 by Mirosław Krajewski. Rypin. Dobrzyński Oddział Włocławskiego Towarzystwa Naukowego. 1999. p. 35-36.
