= Władysław the White's Rebellion =

Władysław the White's rebellion
Date	8 September 1373 – March 1377
Location	Kuyavia
Result	Louis I of Hungary's victory; Władysław the White's resignation of his clams to Polish throne and lands of Duchy of Gniewkowo; Incorporation of Duchy of Gniewkowo into Poland

Belligerents
Kingdom of Poland; Pomerania-Stolp; Duchy of Wieluń (from 1376)	Władysław the White's forces Duchy of Gniewkowo; Ulrich von Osten's forces (1374–1375); Burgundian military units of Philip the Bold (from 1374)

Commanders and leaders
Sędziwój Pałuka; Casimir IV	Władysław the White; Ulrich von Osten (1374–1375)

Władysław the White's rebellion was a princely rebellion fought between 8 September 1373 to March 1377 by forces of Władysław the White, duke of Duchy of Gniewkowo, against the Kingdom of Poland ruled by Louis I of Hungary, over the succession of the Polish throne. The war was won by Louis I and in March 1377, Władysław the White had agreed to give up his claims to the throne.

== Context ==
Władysław the White was a duke of Duchy of Gniewkowo, which lands he sold to the king of Poland between 1363 and 1364. After the death of Casimir III the Great in 1370, Władysław had attempted to gain a right to succession of the throne of Poland, with the support of the Kuyavian and Greater Poland nobility opposed to the coronation of the Louis I of Hungary as the king. In order to that, he began several efforts to be released from his holy vows, but without results. Finally, in November 1371 the Pope Gregory XI, under the pressure of King of Poland, Louis I of Hungary, definitely refused the dispensation of his vows, and Władysław was forced to return to Dijon.

== The war ==
On 8 September 1373, Władysław the White secretly arrived to Gniezno, and between 9 and 10 September, with the support to the opposition of the Angevin rule, he quickly captured Gniewkowo, Włocławek, Inowrocław and Złotoria; reestablishing, formerly ruled by him, Duchy of Gniewkowo. Due to the more numerous forces of Louis I's supporters led by Sędziwój Pałuka, the king's refusal to negotiate and the betrayal among his own people, by 1374, Władysław had retreated to Driesen, in the State of the Teutonic Order.

Władysław, supported by Ulrich von Osten and a few Burgundian military units of Philip the Bold, had invaded Kuyavia again in 1375. During the attack, Władysław's forces had gained control over the Gniewkowo as well as the castles in the villages of Złotoria and Raciążek. At this point, both sides of the conflict were better prepared than in 1373. One of the more important fights in the conflict was the battle of Gniewkowo, during which the royal side had a decisive victory. Later, Władysław's forces had retreated to the Złotoria Castle and became fortified, but faced a siege that lasted from 1 June 1376 to early 1377. Casimir IV, duke of the Pomerania-Stolp and owner of Złotoria Castle fought in the battle, and in June 1376, he got injured in the head. The injury eventually led to his death on 2 January 1377. In the spring of 1376, Vladislaus II of Opole had sent his knights to join forces led by Sędziwój Pałuka against Władysław the White. At the beginning of 1377, Władysław had capitulated the castle. Following that, he had challenged Bartosz Wezenborg to a duel, which he lost and during which he got injured.

In March 1377, in the agreement signed in Brześć Kujawski, Władysław the White agreed to give up his claims to the throne of Poland and lands of the Duchy of Gniewkowo. In return, he was given 10 000 florins and the status of the Abbot Governator of Pannonhalma Archabbey.

== Important battles ==
- Battle of Gniewkowo
- Siege of Złotoria

== Bibliography ==
- Rodowód Piastów małopolskich i kujawskich by K. Jasiński. Poznań–Wrocław. 2001. ISBN 83-913563-5-3.
- Piastowie. Leksykon biograficzny by S. Szczur and K. Ożog. Kraków. 1999. ISBN 83-08-02829-2.
- Władysław Biały. Ostatni Książę Kujawski by Józef Śliwiński. Kraków. 2017. ISBN 978-83-7730-250-7.
- Rodowód książąt pomorskich by E. Rymar. Szczecin. Pomeranian Library. 2005. ISBN 83-87879-50-9, OCLC 69296056.
- Ziemia Dobrzyńska: Zeszyty Historyczne Dobrzyńskiego Oddziału WTN, vol. 6 by Mirosław Krajewski. Rypin. Dobrzyński Oddział Włocławskiego Towarzystwa Naukowego. 1999. p. 35-36.
