= Battle of Gniewkowo =

1375 battle in Poland

- Part of Władysław the White's rebellion
| Date | 1375 |
| Location | Gniewkowo, Duchy of Gniewkowo |
| Result | Polish victory |

Belligerents
| Kingdom of Poland; Pomerania-Stolp | Władysław the White's forces Duchy of Gniewkowo; Burgundian military units of Philip the Bold |

Commanders and leaders
| Sędziwój Pałuka; Casimir IV | Władysław the White |

Battle of Gniewkowo (Note: Polish: bitwa pod Gniewkowem) was fought in 1375, during Władysław the White's rebellion, between rebel forces of Władysław the White, that included Duchy of Gniewkowo and Burgundian military units aided by Philip the Bold, against forces of Kingdom of Poland led by Sędziwój Pałuka, and Pomerania-Stolp led by Casimir IV. It was fought near Gniewkowo, a capital of Duchy of Gniewkowo, ruled by Władysław. The battle ended with a decisive Polish victory and severe casualties on the rebel side. After the defeat, Władysław had retreated with his remaining forces to the Złotoria Castle, where they had faced a siege.

== Bibliography ==
- Rodowód Piastów małopolskich i kujawskich by K. Jasiński. Poznań–Wrocław. 2001. ISBN 83-913563-5-3.
- Piastowie. Leksykon biograficzny by S. Szczur and K. Ożog. Kraków. 1999. ISBN 83-08-02829-2.
- Władysław Biały. Ostatni Książę Kujawski by Józef Śliwiński. Kraków. 2017. ISBN 978-83-7730-250-7.
