= Grzegorz Bała =

Polish footballer (born 1971)

Personal information
- Date of birth: 18 October 1971 (age 55)
- Place of birth: Górzno, Poland
- Height: 1.79 m (5 ft 10 in)
- Position: Striker

Team information
- Current team: Unifreeze Górzno
- Number: 16

Senior career*
| Years | Team | Apps | (Gls) |
| –1995 | Sparta Brodnica | | |
| 1995–1997 | Zawisza Bydgoszcz | | |
| 1997–1999 | Sparta Brodnica | | |
| 2000 | RoPS | 32 | (4) |
| 2001–2002 | Sparta Brodnica | | |
| 2002–2003 | Aluminium Konin | 33 | (13) |
| 2003–2004 | Ceramika Opoczno | 28 | (3) |
| 2004–2005 | Drwęca Nowe Miasto Lubawskie | | |
| 2006 | Sparta Brodnica | | |
| 2007 | Rodło Kwidzyn | | |
| 2008–2010 | Unifreeze Miesiączkowo | | |
| 2010–2011 | Sparta/Unifreeze Brodnica | | |
| 2011–2014 | Drwęca Nowe Miasto Lubawskie | | |
| 2014–2016 | Naprzód Jabłonowo Pomorskie | | |
| 2016 | Sparta Brodnica | | |
| 2020 | Unifreeze Górzno | 18 | (21) |
| 2021–2022 | Zamek Kurzętnik | 17 | (5) |
| 2023– | Unifreeze Górzno | 15 | (11) |
- * Club domestic league appearances and goals as of 8 September 2024

Grzegorz Bała (born 18 October 1971) is a Polish footballer who plays as a striker for Unifreeze Górzno.

== Early life ==
He is a native of Górzno, Poland. He has been nicknamed "Bałer".

== Career ==
He started his career with Polish side Sparta Brodnica. In 1995, he signed for Polish side Zawisza Bydgoszcz. In 1997, he returned to Polish side Sparta Brodnica. In 2000, he signed for Finnish side RoPS. In 2001, he returned to Polish side Sparta Brodnica. In 2002, he signed for Polish side Aluminium Konin. In 2003, he signed for Polish side Ceramika Opoczno. In 2004, he signed for Polish side Drwęca Nowe Miasto Lubawskie. In 2006, he returned to Polish side Sparta Brodnica. In 2007, he signed for Polish side Rodło Kwidzyn. In 2008, he returned to Polish side Sparta Brodnica. He helped the club achieve promotion. In 2011, he returned to Polish side Drwęca Nowe Miasto Lubawskie. In 2014, he signed for Polish side Naprzód Jabłonowo Pomorskie. In 2016, he returned to Polish side Sparta Brodnica.

== Personal life ==
He is married, and has a son and a daughter.
