= Tomasz Warczachowski =

Polish footballer

Personal information
- Full name: Tomasz Warczachowski
- Date of birth: 13 September 1974 (age 52)
- Place of birth: Toruń, Poland
- Height: 1.84 m (6 ft 1/2 in)
- Position: Defender

Senior career*
Years	Team	Apps	(Gls)
- Pomorzanin Toruń
- Sparta Brodnica
1997–1998	Kasztelan Popowo Biskupie		
1999–2003	Pomorzanin Toruń		
2003–2004	Stal Stalowa Wola		
2004–2005	Arka Gdynia	7	(0)
2005–2009	Unia Janikowo		
2009–2011	Zawisza Bydgoszcz	53	(2)
2011–2018	Flisak Złotoria		
- * Club domestic league appearances and goals

Tomasz Warczachowski (born 13 September 1974) is a Polish former professional footballer who played as a defender.

== Career ==
=== Club ===
The club he spent a lot of years of his career was Pomorzanin Toruń.

In July 2009, he joined Zawisza Bydgoszcz.
