= Filonov =

Filonov (Russian: Филонов) is a surname. Notable people with the surname include:

- Alexey Filonov (born 1961), Russian swimmer
- Oleh Filonov (born 2004), Ukrainian footballer
- Pavel Filonov (1883–1941), Russian avant-garde painter, art theorist, and poet
