= Szarlej, Kuyavian-Pomeranian Voivodeship =

Szarlej
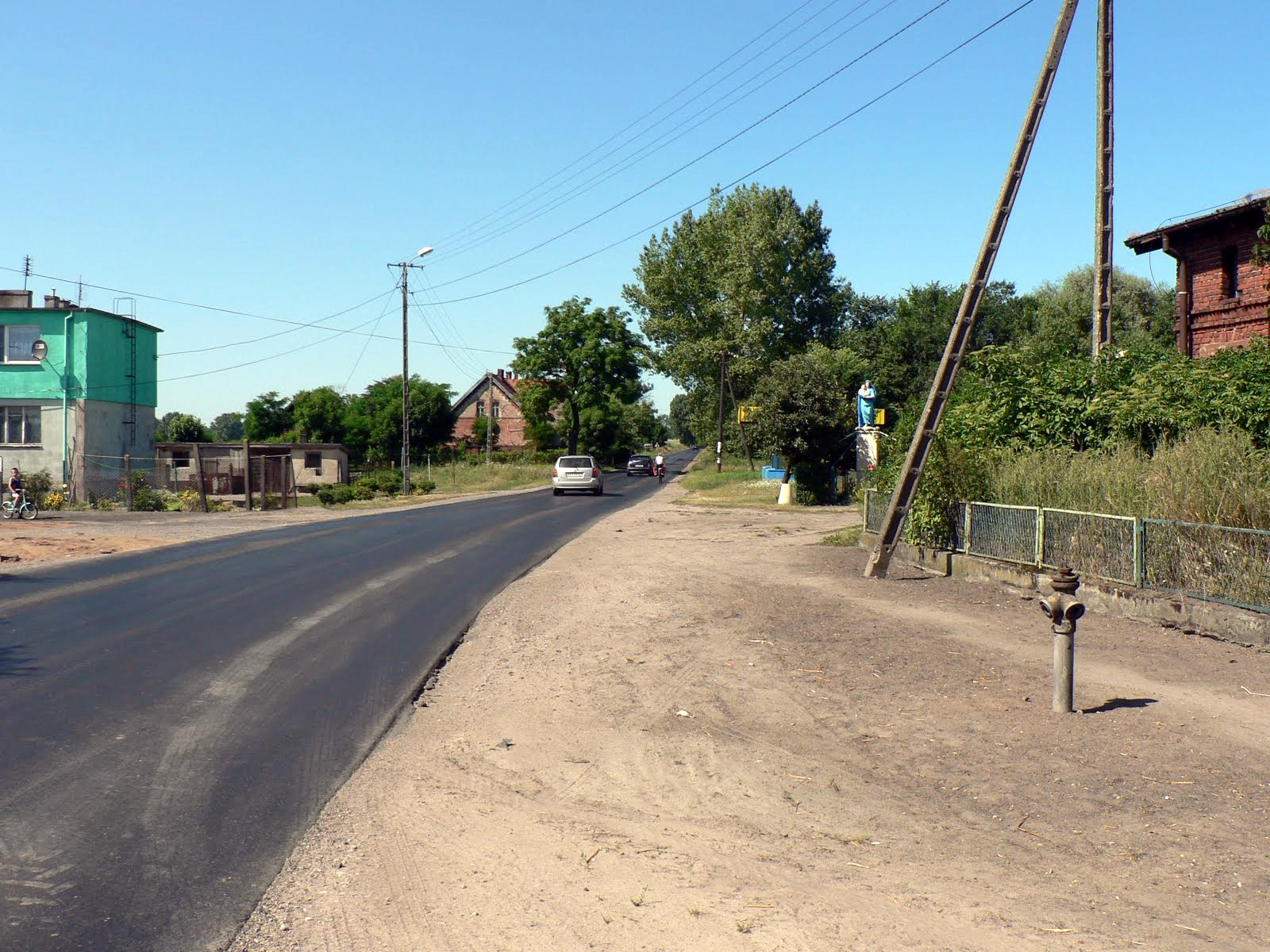
- Szarlej in 2010.

- Location within Poland Location within Kuyavian-Pomeranian Voivodeship
- Coordinates: 52°42′55″N 18°19′02″E
- Country: Poland
- Voivodeship: Kuyavian-Pomeranian
- County: Inowrocław
- Gmina: Kruszwica

Population (2011)
  - Total: 256
- Time zone: UTC+1 (CET)
  - Summer (DST): UTC+2 (CEST)
- Car plates: CIN

Szarlej (Polish: [ˈʂar.lɛj]) is a hamlet in Kuyavian-Pomeranian Voivodeship, Poland located in the Gmina Kruszwica, Inowrocław County. In March 2011, it was inhabited by 256 people.

== History ==
In the 14th century, Szarlej was an important settlement in the Duchy of Gniewkowo. In 1343, as the previous capital of the state, Gniewkowo, got burned down during the Polish–Teutonic War, Szarlej became the seat of the duke, and therefore, de facto capital of the state.
