= Duchy of Wieluń =

Duchy in Poland 1370-1391

Duchy of Wieluń Księstwo wieluńskie (Polish) Ducatus Velumensis (Latin)
- 1370–1391
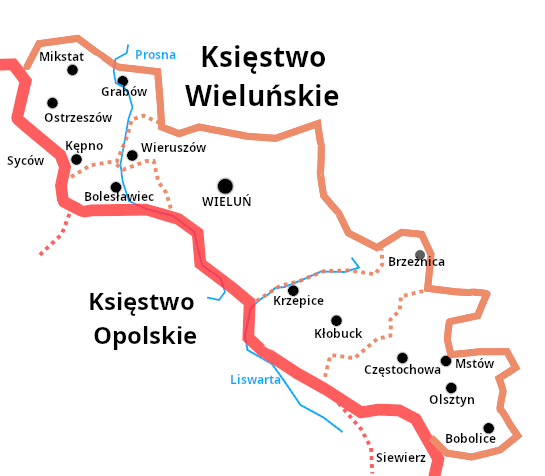
- Map of the duchy
- Status: Fiefdom of Kingdom of Poland
- Capital: Wieluń
- Official languages: Polish, Latin
- Religion: Roman Catholic
- Government: District principality
- Duke
  - 1370–1391: Vladislaus II of Opole
- Historical era: High Middle Ages
  - Partition from Kingdom of Poland: 17 November 1370
  - Incorporation into Kingdom of Poland: 1391
- Currency: Wieluń denar
Preceded by	Succeeded by
Kingdom of Poland	Kingdom of Poland

Duchy of Wieluń (Note: Polish: Księstwo wieluńskie; Latin: Ducatus Velumensis) was a district principality and a fiefdom within the Kingdom of Poland. It was formed in 1370 from part of the Kingdom of Poland, and existed until 1391 when it was incorporated back into it. The country was located in Wieluń Land with Wieluń as its capital. Its only ruler was Vladislaus II of Opole of Silesian Piast dynasty.

== History ==
The state was formed on 17 November 1370, when King of Poland, Louis I of Hungary, had given Vladislaus II of Opole territory of Wieluń Land as his own duchy. Vladislaus II was given those lands due to his help to the king in the process of legal succession of the throne of Poland. The state located in Wieluń Land with Wieluń as its capital. Local mint had begun minting new silver coins known as Wieluń denars.

In the spring of 1376, Vladislaus II had sent his knights to join forces led by Sędziwój Pałuka against Władysław the White in his rebellion against the Polish king.

In 1378, the duchy was enlarged with the incorporation of Bobolice, Brzeźnica, Krzepice and Olsztyn. Around that time, the state was subdivided into districts of Wieluń, Ostrzeszów, Olsztyn, Krzepice, Brzeźnica and Bolesławiec.

Between 13 July and 15 August 1391, while Vladislaus II was in Hungary, forces aligned with Władysław II Jagiełło had besieged Kruszwica Castle and later had taken the stronghold in Racibórz, both of which belonged to Vladislaus. By doing so, they had started the war between two monarchs. In September 1391, Jagiełło's forces had captured lands of Gniewkowo Land and Dobrzyń. On 15 September 1391, Jagiełło's forces had entered Wieluń, beginning the war theatre on the territories of the duchy. In the autumn of 1391, the war had ended with Jagiełło's victory. Following that, Duchy of Wieluń was incorporated into Kingdom of Poland.

== Subdivisions ==
From around 1378, the duchy was subdivided into districts of Wieluń, Ostrzeszów, Olsztyn, Krzepice, Brzeźnica, and Bolesławiec.

== List of rulers ==
- Vladislaus II of Opole (1370–1391)
