= Oleh Filonov =

Ukrainian footballer

Personal information
- Full name: Oleh Vadymovych Filonov
- Date of birth: 22 July 2004 (age 22)
- Place of birth: Ukraine
- Height: 1.80 m (5 ft 11 in)
- Position: Attacking midfielder

Team information
- Current team: Sparta Brodnica
- Number: 8

Youth career
- 2017–2020: Mariupol

Senior career*
Years	Team	Apps	(Gls)
2020–2022	Mariupol	1	(0)
2023	Bischofswerdaer FV 08	13	(1)
2023	Podlasie Biała Podlaska	1	(0)
2023–2024	→ Huragan Międzyrzec Podlaski (loan)	21	(2)
2024–	Sparta Brodnica	25	(5)
- * Club domestic league appearances and goals as of 08:13, 25 June 2025 (UTC)

Oleh Vadymovych Filonov (Ukrainian: Олег Вадимович Філонов; born 22 July 2004) is a Ukrainian professional footballer who plays as an attacking midfielder for Polish club Sparta Brodnica.
