= Wieluń denar =

- Duchy of Wieluń
- Mass: c. 0.25 g (0.009 oz)
- Diameter: 12/14 mm
- Years of minting: 14th cenutury
- Mintage: Wieluń

Obverse
- Design: 2 crosses and a tower with the inscription "MONETA VELUNES"

Reverse
- Design: A moon and an eagle with the inscription "DUCI[S] [LADIS]LAI"

The Wieluń denar (Note: Polish: Denar wieluński; Latin: denarius velumensis) was 14th century silver coin minted in Wieluń. It served as a currency of the Duchy of Wieluń, that existed between 1370 and 1391.

== Description ==
The coin was made out of silver and weighed around 0.25 g (0.009 oz). Its diameter was between 12 and 14 mm.

On the obverse, the coin had an image of the battlemented tower with a pointy roof and the ball at the top, which was located between two crosses. The side had an inscription that read: "MONETA VELUNES", which translates as minted in Wieluń. On the reverse it had the moon and an eagle without a crown, faced to the right. The inscription of that said read: "DUCI[S] [LADIS]LAI" indicating that it was minted from the orders of the Duke Vladislaus II of Opole.

== See also ==
- Denarius
- Dinar
