= Jakub Zabłocki =

Polish footballer

Personal information
- Date of birth: 14 July 1984
- Place of birth: Chełmno, Poland
- Date of death: 22 August 2015 (aged 31)
- Place of death: Chełmno, Poland
- Height: 1.70 m (5 ft 7 in)
- Position: Striker

Youth career
- Gwiazda Starogród
- Pomowiec Kijewo Królewskie

Senior career*
Years	Team	Apps	(Gls)
2001	Chemik Bydgoszcz		
2000–2001	Polonia Bydgoszcz		
2002–2003	Sparta Brodnica		
2003–2008	Korona Kielce	11	(2)
2004–2005	→ Pogoń Staszów (loan)		
2006	→ Odra Opole (loan)		
2008–2009	Polonia Bytom	15	(5)
2009–2010	Lechia Gdańsk	22	(3)
2010	Lechia Gdańsk II	7	(3)
2011	Wisła Płock	7	(3)
2012	Siarka Tarnobrzeg	12	(7)
2012	LZS Samborzec		
2013	Concordia Elbląg	4	(0)
2013	Olimpia Grudziądz	6	(0)
2014	Rodło Kwidzyn	8	(12)
- * Club domestic league appearances and goals

Jakub Zabłocki (14 July 1984 – 22 August 2015) was a Polish professional footballer who played as a striker.

== Career ==
In February 2011, he joined Wisła Płock on a one-and-a-half-year contract. He was released half a year later.

== Honours ==
Siarka Tarnobrzeg

- III liga Lublin–Subcarpathia: 2011–12
