= Robert Kłos =

Polish footballer

Personal information
- Full name: Robert Kłos
- Date of birth: 4 February 1982 (age 44)
- Place of birth: Złotoria, Poland
- Height: 1.85 m (6 ft 1 in)
- Position: Midfielder

Senior career*
Years	Team	Apps	(Gls)
1999–2001	Toruński KP		
2002	Sparta Brodnica		
2002–2003	Polonia Bydgoszcz		
2003–2006	Zagłębie Lubin	65	(1)
2006–2008	Widzew Łódź	44	(0)
2008–2010	Odra Wodzisław	38	(1)
2011	Elana Toruń	9	(0)
2015	Flisak Zlotoria		
2016	Elana Toruń	6	(0)
- * Club domestic league appearances and goals

Robert Kłos (born 4 February 1982) is a Polish former professional footballer who played as a midfielder.

== Career ==
=== Club ===
In February 2011, he joined Elana Toruń on a half year contract.
