= Wieluń Land =

Standard of the Land of Wieluń from the Battle of Grunwald in 1410

Wieluń District Coat of Arms

Wieluń Land (Polish: ziemia wieluńska; Latin: Terra Velumensis), originally known as Ruda Land (Polish: ziemia rudzka; Latin: terra Rudensis, territorium Rudense), was a land of the Kingdom of Poland and the Polish–Lithuanian Commonwealth, and a part of the historical Sieradz-Łęczyca Land (Polish: ziemia łęczycko-sieradzka). Wieluń Land for centuries was part of Sieradz Voivodeship in the Province of Greater Poland.

Wieluń Land covers current the counties of Wieluń, Ostrzeszów, Wieruszów and Kępno (the eastern half, with the capital), as well as some locations in the counties of Olesno, Pajęczno, Kłobuck, and also Częstochowa (an exclave). It covers about 3,000 km^{2} and has 200,000 inhabitants.

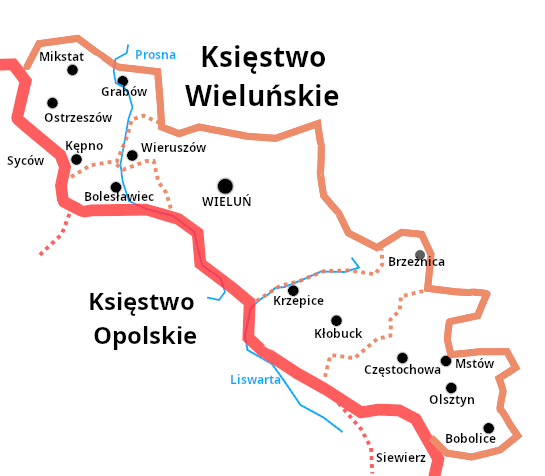
Duchy of Wieluń (1370-1391)

== History ==
Wieluń Land developed from the medieval Castellany of Ruda, which was first mentioned in the 1136 Bull of Gniezno, and during the period known as the Fragmentation of Poland (see Testament of Bolesław III Krzywousty), it was part of Greater Poland proper. During a few years in the 13th century, it was twice ruled by the Dukes of Silesia. In 1281, the castellany was moved from Ruda to nearby Wieluń. In both the Kingdom of Poland and the Polish–Lithuanian Commonwealth, Wieluń Land had its own offices, and the Castellan of Wieluń was one of the Senators of Poland. The land had four starostas – at Wieluń itself, Ostrzeszów, Bolesławiec and Grabów nad Prosną. Two deputies to the Sejm were elected at Wieluń's Sejmiks. Furthermore, the Voivode of Sieradz was obliged to appoint his deputy from Wieluń. Wieluń Land had its own coat of arms, established between 1410 and 1434.

== Sources ==
- History of Wieluń and its land (in Polish)
