= Kazimierz III of Gniewkowo =

- Issue: Elizabeth: Władysław the White

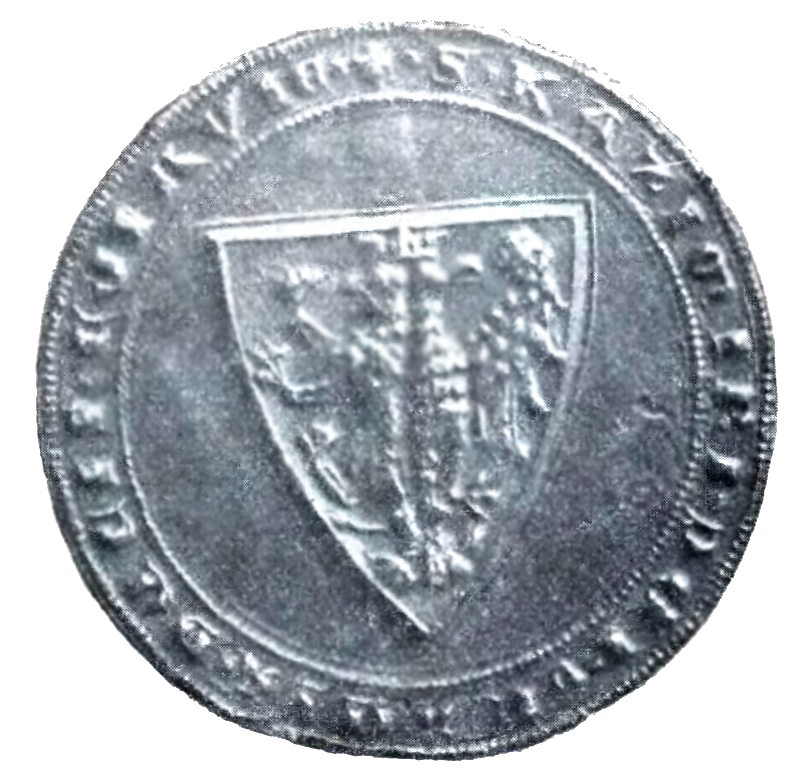
Kazimierz III of Gniewkowo's Seal.

Kazimierz III of Gniewkowo (ca. 1280/84 – 22 August 1345/13 May 1350), was a Polish prince member of the House of Piast, Duke of Inowrocław during 1287-1314 (under the regency of his mother until 1294 and his brother during 1294–1296), since 1306 vassal of the Kingdom of Poland, Governor of the Duchy of Pomerelia (Gdańsk Pomerania) during 1306-1309 (on behalf of his uncle Władysław I the Elbow-high), after 1314 ruler over Gniewkowo (between 1332 and 1343 deposed by the Teutonic Order).

He was the third and youngest son of Ziemomysł of Inowrocław and Salomea, daughter of Sambor II, Duke of Pomerelia.

== Life ==
After the death of their father in 1287, Kazimierz III and his older brothers Leszek and Przemysł inherited his domains; however, because they are minors, remained under the regency of their mother and paternal half-uncle Władysław I the Elbow-high until 1294, when Leszek, as the oldest brother, attained his majority and assumed the government and the guardianship of his brothers. Kazimierz III attained his majority ca. 1302, but initially ruled jointly with his brothers; two years previously (in 1300) he was forced to paid homage to King Wenceslaus II of Bohemia.

In 1306 he paid homage to his uncle Władysław I, in return for which he was appointed Governor of Gdańsk Pomerania, with his base in Tczew. In 1309, he was forced to abandon his post as a result of the invasion of the Teutonic Order, despite a personal conversation with the Komtur Heinrich von Plötzke, even asked him on his knees to return the cities taken by the Teutonic Knights to his rightful owner, Władysław I, but without success.

Shortly after, Kazimierz III and his brother Przemysł where involved in a financial dispute with Bishop Gerward. In December 1310 both princes looted the district of Raciąż, who belonged to the Bishopric, and in retaliation, on 2 January 1311 the Bishop excommunicated both. In response, the princes imprisoned both the Bishop and his brother Stanisław, Provost of Włocławek. Both parties made an agreement only on 22 November: the Bishop and his brother were released, and the excommunication against the princes was lifted.

In 1314 was made the formal division of the paternal inheritance between Kazimierz III and his brothers; as the youngest son, he received the small district of Gniewkowo. Between 18 and 23 June 1318, he took part in the meeting at Sulejów. As an ally of the Polish King his name also appears on a document dated from 1325, on the occasion of the conclusion of an alliance between Władysław I and Western Pomerania.

In April 1332, during the next stage of the Polish-Teutonic War, the Teutonic Knights besieged Gniewkowo. Kazimierz III, unable to defend his Duchy and not wanting to be captured, decided to escape after burning the main fortress. During the war, all Kujawy was lost, and Casimir III found himself in exile, probably in the court of Władysław I. His fate after the loss of his domains is uncertain, because he only appears during the Second Polish-Teutonic Trial (4 February-15 September 1339), where he testified, and during the Treaty of Kalisz (8 July 1343), where thanks to the provisions arranged there he was able to return to his Duchy.

Kazimierz III died between 22 August 1345 and 13 May 1350. Is unknown where he was buried.

== Marriage and issue ==
Between 1312/18, Kazimierz III married, although the name and origins of his wife are unknown. She certainly died between 19 April 1332/13 July 1343, because at the time of his return to Gniewkowo he was already a widower.

The chronicler Jan of Czarnków mentioned that Kazimierz III had several sons and daughters, but only two survive to adulthood:

- Elizabeth (ca. 1315/23 – after 22 August 1345), who married Stephen II, Ban of Bosnia, and was the mother of Elizabeth of Bosnia, Queen consort of Poland and Hungary
- Władysław the White (ca. 1327/33 — died on 29 February 1388).
