= Battle of Montichiari =

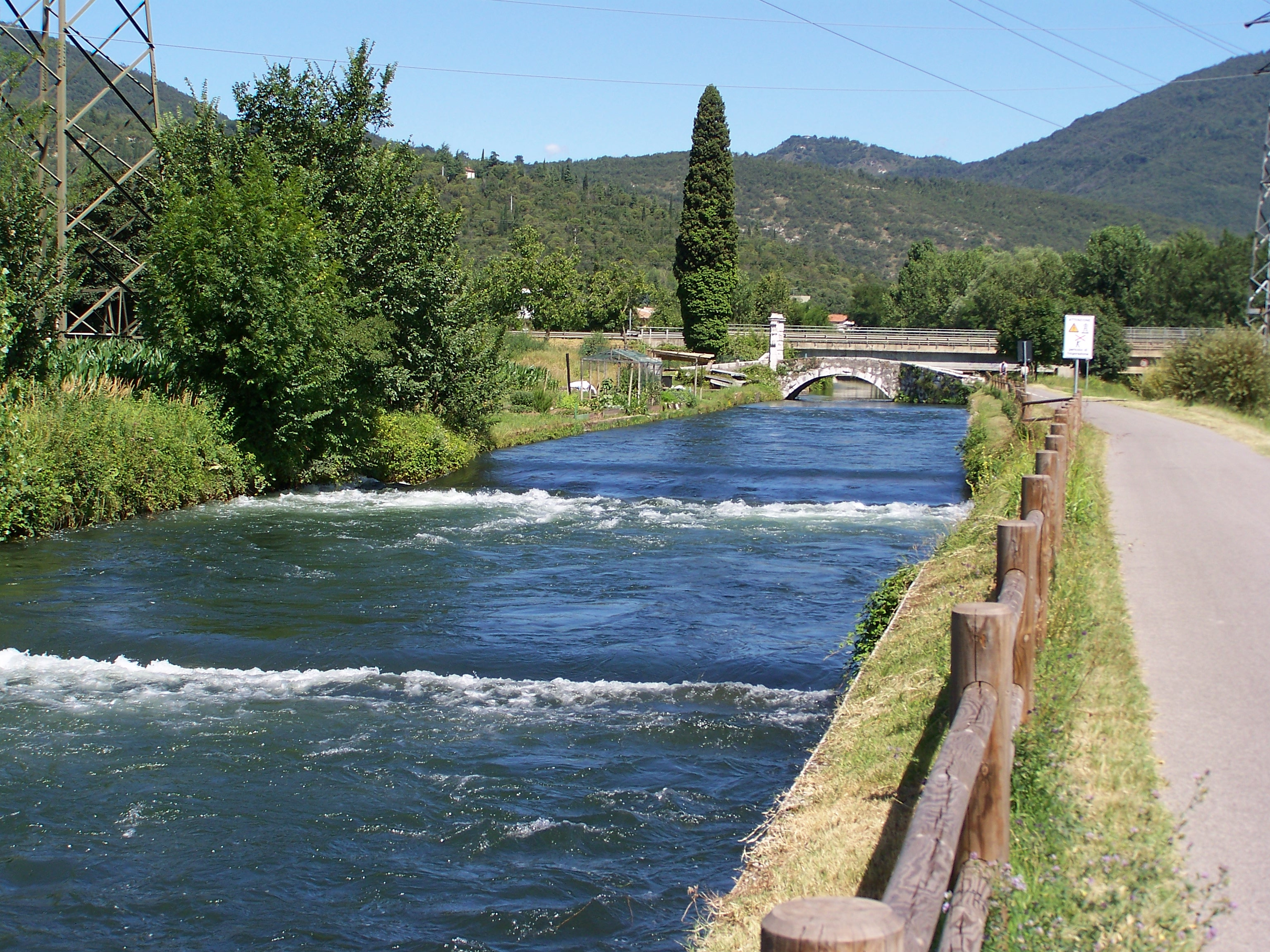
- Papal League against the Visconti
Date	7 and 8 May 1373
Location	Montichiari and Gavardo, Province of Brescia, Lombardy, Italy
Result	Papal victory

Belligerents
Papal States	Milan

Commanders and leaders
Raymond de Turenne; Othon de Brunswick; John Hawkwood; Enguerrand de Coucy; Amanieu de Pomiers; Galéotto Malatesta; Hugolin de Savignac	Galéas de Saluces; Bernabò Visconti; Gian Galeazzo Visconti

Strength
700 lances and 400 archers	1,000 men at arms and 300 archers

The Battle of Montichiari (May 1373), is one of the most important episodes of the war waged by the papal league led by Gregory XI against the Visconti of Milan, preparing the return of the pope to Rome.

The aim of the pope was to reduce the power of the Ducate of Milan, traditional leaders of the Ghibellines, a constant threat on the territories of the Papal States.

== Bibliography ==
- Arveno Sala, « La cospirazione antiviscontea in Bergamo del 1373 », Rivista del Centro Studia et Ricerche Archivio Bergamasco, 1983.
- B. Galland, « Le rôle du comte de Savoie dans la ligue de Grégoire XI contre les Visconti (1372-1375) », Mélanges de l'École française de Rome, Vol. 105, n° 105-2, 1993.
- Jean-Pierre Saltarelli, La campagne d'Italie de Raymond de Turenne (1372-1373), Bulletin de la Société scientifique, historique et archéologique de la Corèze, T. 130, 2008.
