= Górzno =

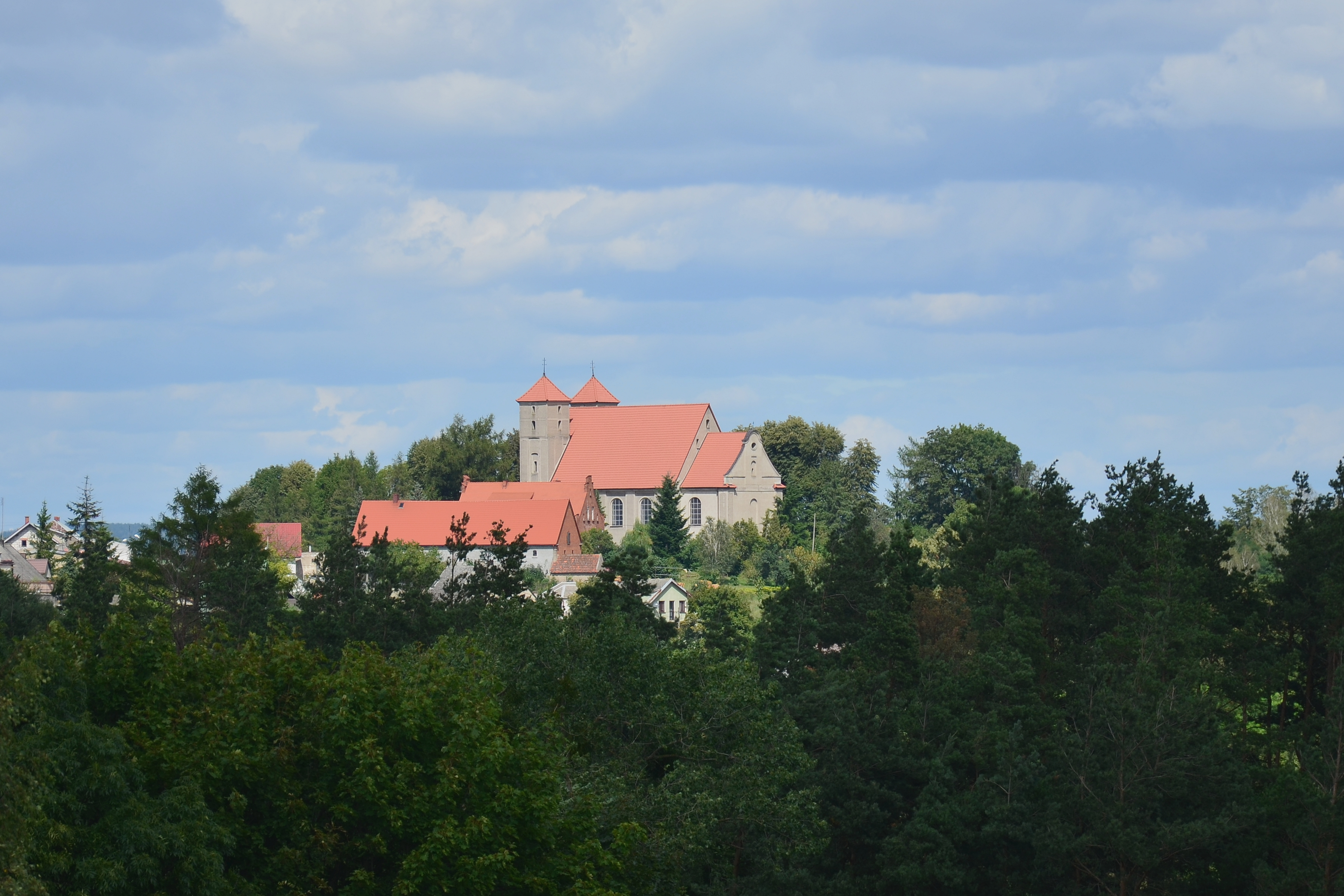
- View of Górzno

- Coat of arms

- Location within Poland
- Coordinates: 53°12′N 19°39′E
- Country: Poland
- Voivodeship: Kuyavian-Pomeranian
- County: Brodnica
- Gmina: Górzno
- First mentioned: 1239
- Town rights: 1327

Area
  - Total: 3.43 km^{2} (1.32 sq mi)

Population (2006)
  - Total: 1,362
  - Density: 397/km^{2} (1,030/sq mi)
- Time zone: UTC+1 (CET)
  - Summer (DST): UTC+2 (CEST)
- Postal code: 87-320
- Vehicle registration: CBR
- Website: http://www.gorzno.pl

Górzno [ˈɡuʐnɔ] is a town in Brodnica County, Kuyavian-Pomeranian Voivodeship, in north-central Poland, with 1,369 inhabitants (2006). It is located within the historic Dobrzyń Land.

== History ==
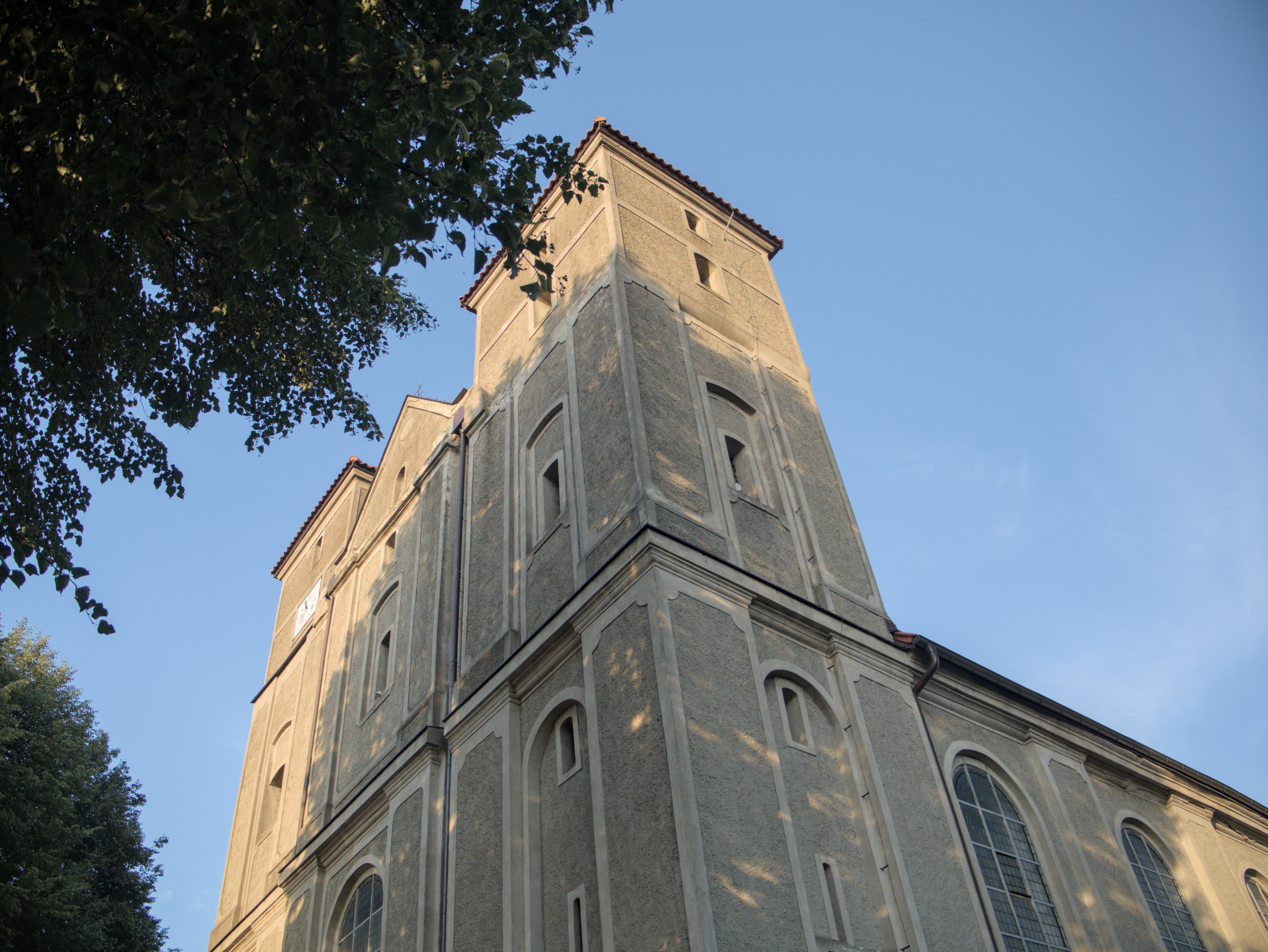
Exaltation of the Holy Cross Church

In 1325, the church of the Canons Regular of the Holy Sepulchre was founded. Górzno was granted town rights in 1327. It was a private church town, administratively located in the Rypin County in the Inowrocław Voivodeship in the Greater Poland Province of the Kingdom of Poland. The Battle of Górzno was fought nearby in 1629.

During the German occupation of Poland in World War II, the occupiers renamed the town to Görzberg to erase traces of Polish origin.
