= Pomeranian Library =

Library in Szczecin, Poland

Coordinates: 53.4233°N 14.5533°E

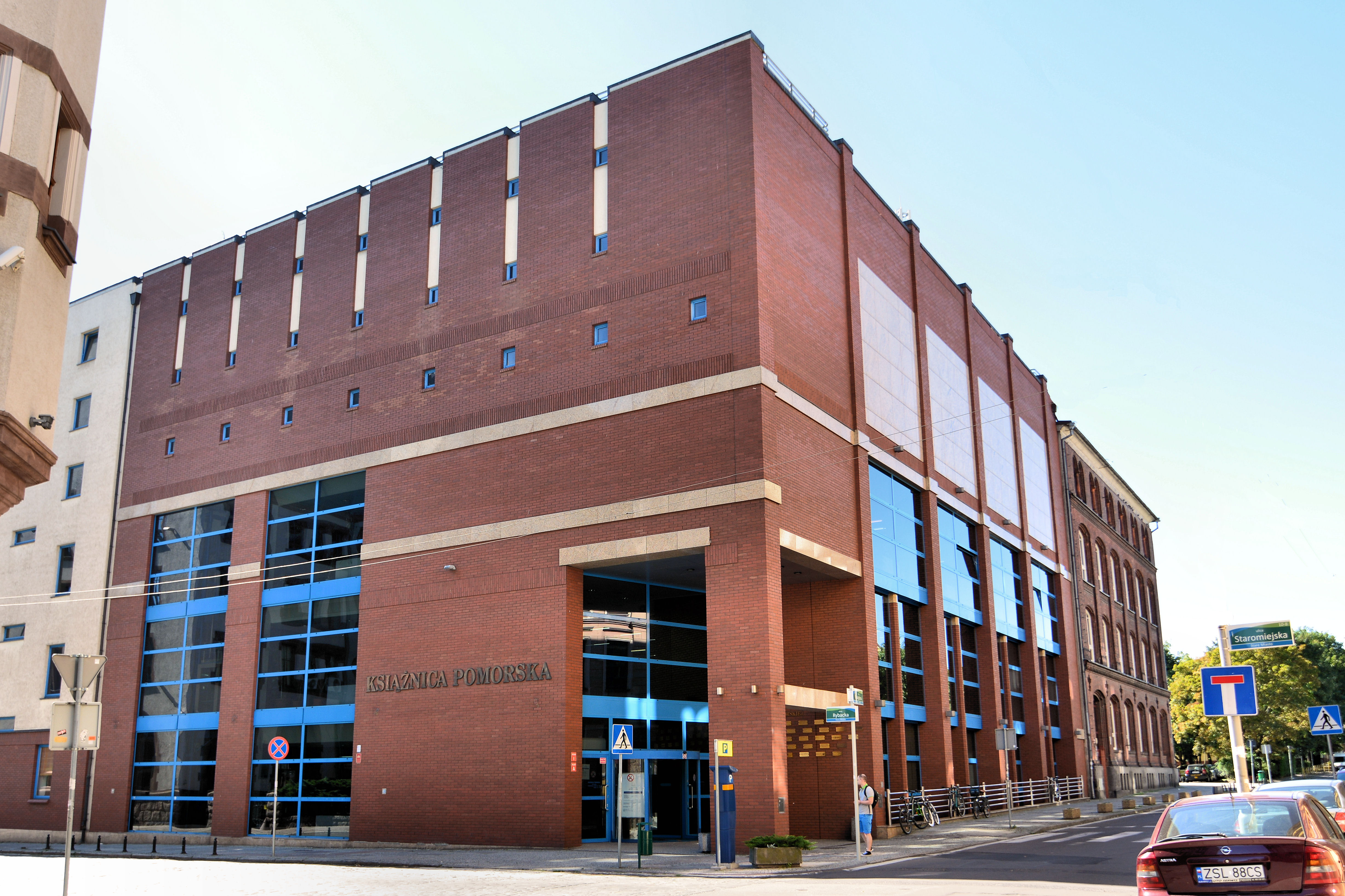
North-eastern part of the building - a view from Podgórna Street

The Pomeranian Library (Polish: Książnica Pomorska), in full Stanisław Staszic Pomeranian Library (Polish: Książnica Pomorska im. Stanisława Staszica) is a Regional Library based in Szczecin (formerly Stettin), Poland. It is the largest humanities oriented library in West Pomerania, with a focus on social sciences, Pomeranian, Scandinavian and German subjects and Seamanship. The library possesses also general scientific reading room with books from other fields of science, including mathematics, natural and medical sciences.

== History ==
The library was founded as the City Library of Szczecin in 1905, and housed in a 1868 building originally designed to serve as a secondary school.

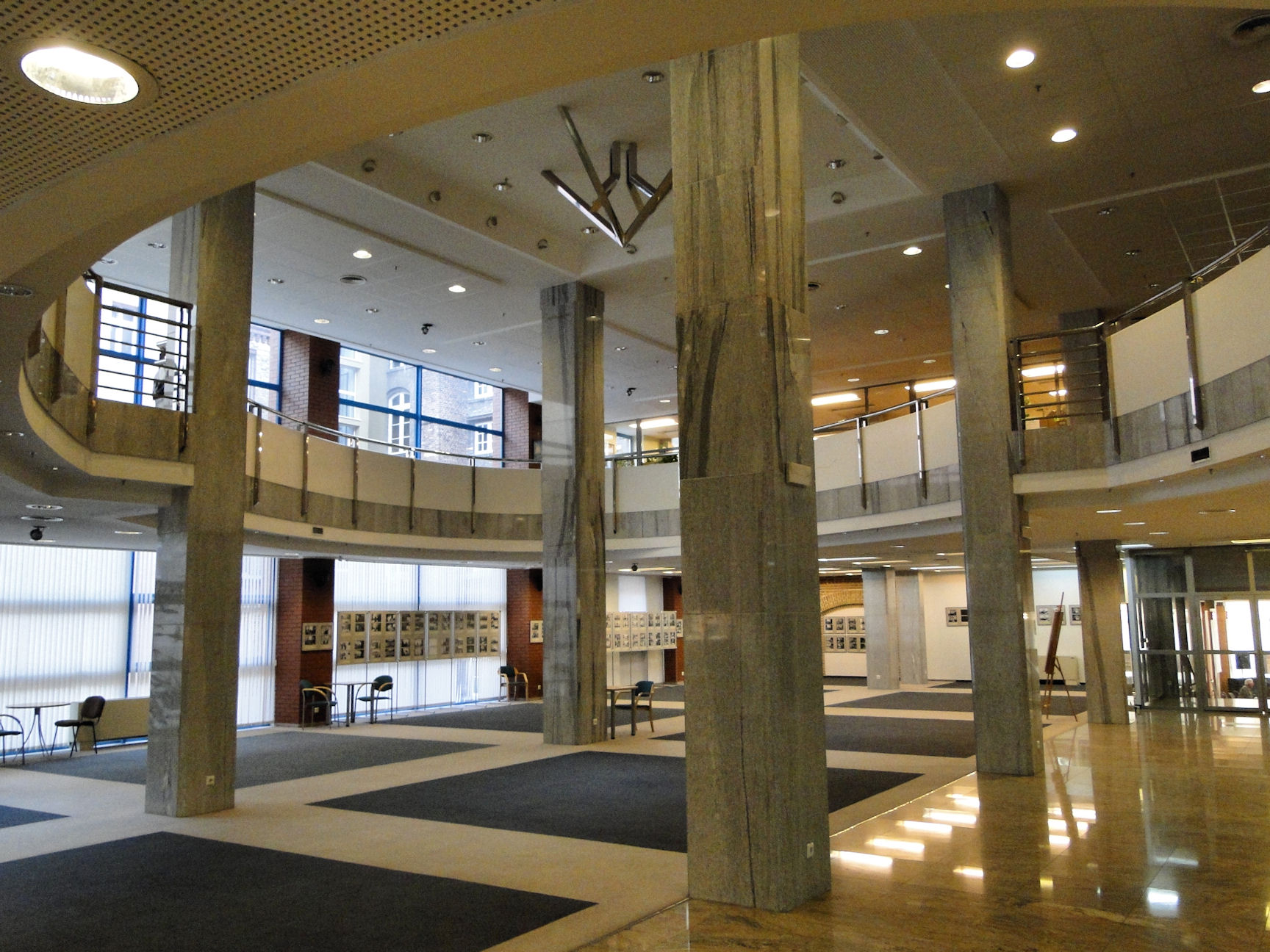
The part of the interior for exhibitions

During World War II part of the library building was destroyed due to air raid bombing. Upon World War II ending, the library reopened on the 12th of July, 1945. It was the first Polish library in the city to reopen post-war.

Ownership was transferred from central to local government in 1990.

On the 3rd of October 1994 the library was renamed to become the Pomeranian Library.

In 2009 the library opened a digital collection, allowing for online access of records and collections.

== See also ==
- List of libraries in Poland

== Literature ==
- Bernhard Fabian, Marzena Zacharska, Todorka Nikolova: Handbuch deutscher historischer Buchbestände in Europa. Polen und Bulgarien. Georg Olms Verlag, Hildesheim 1999, ISBN 978-3-487-10359-4, S. 165f.
- Książnica Pomorska im. Stanisława Staszica w Szczecinie (Hrsg.): Schätze der Pommerschen Bibliothek Szczezin, 4. veränderte Auflage, Szczecin, Poland (2010), ISBN 978-83-87879-78-5
- Stephanie Funk: Östlich der Oder: Polen und sein Bibliothekswesen. In: LIBREAS. Library Ideas 04/2006.
