= Sparta Brodnica =

Polish football club

- Full name: Brodnicki Klub Sportowy Sparta Brodnica
- Nickname: Gallioneri
- Founded: 13 May 1913; 112 years ago (as Gymnasial Fussbal Club)
- Ground: Brodnica OSiR Stadium
- Capacity: 2,500
- Chairman: Wojciech Szul
- Manager: Krystian Janczak
- League: IV liga Kuyavia-Pomerania
- 2023–24: IV liga Kuyavia-Pomerania, 11th of 18
- Website: sparta-brodnica.futbolowo.pl
Home colours	Away colours

Sparta Brodnica is a Polish football club, currently playing in IV liga Cuyavia-Pomerania. Founded in 1913 as Gymnasial Fussbal Club, it is based in Brodnica and plays at the Brodnica OSiR Stadium. The club was most successful in the nineties.

Most famous former players of BKS Sparta are Łukasz Fabiański, Jakub Wawrzyniak, Robert Kłos and Jakub Zabłocki.

== League participations ==
- II liga (6 seasons): 1994–95, 1998–99, 1999–2000, 2000–01, 2001–02, 2002–03

== Current squad ==
As of 17 April 2017

Note: Flags indicate national team as defined under FIFA eligibility rules; some limited exceptions apply. Players may hold more than one non-FIFA nationality.

No.	Pos.	Nation	Player
—	GK	POL	Andrzej Szreiber
—	GK	POL	Adam Rysiewski
16	DF	POL	Piotr Lamka (captain)
—	DF	POL	Krystian Janczak
—	DF	POL	Mariusz Śnieć
—	DF	POL	Daniel Łazowski
—	DF	POL	Mateusz Kaźmierczak
—	DF	POL	Tomasz Kaźmierczak
—	DF	POL	Maciej Pawłowski

No.	Pos.	Nation	Player
—	MF	POL	Sebastian Brzóska
—	MF	POL	Mirosław Ratkowski
—	MF	POL	Marcin Rupiński
—	MF	POL	Łukasz Ciechowski
—	MF	POL	Szymon Ciechowski
—	MF	POL	Bartosz Zalewski
—	MF	POL	Radosław Gajkowski
—	FW	POL	Adrian Talaśka
—	FW	UKR	Ivan Kovch
