= Gniewkowo =

Town in Kuyavian-Pomeranian Voivodeship, Poland

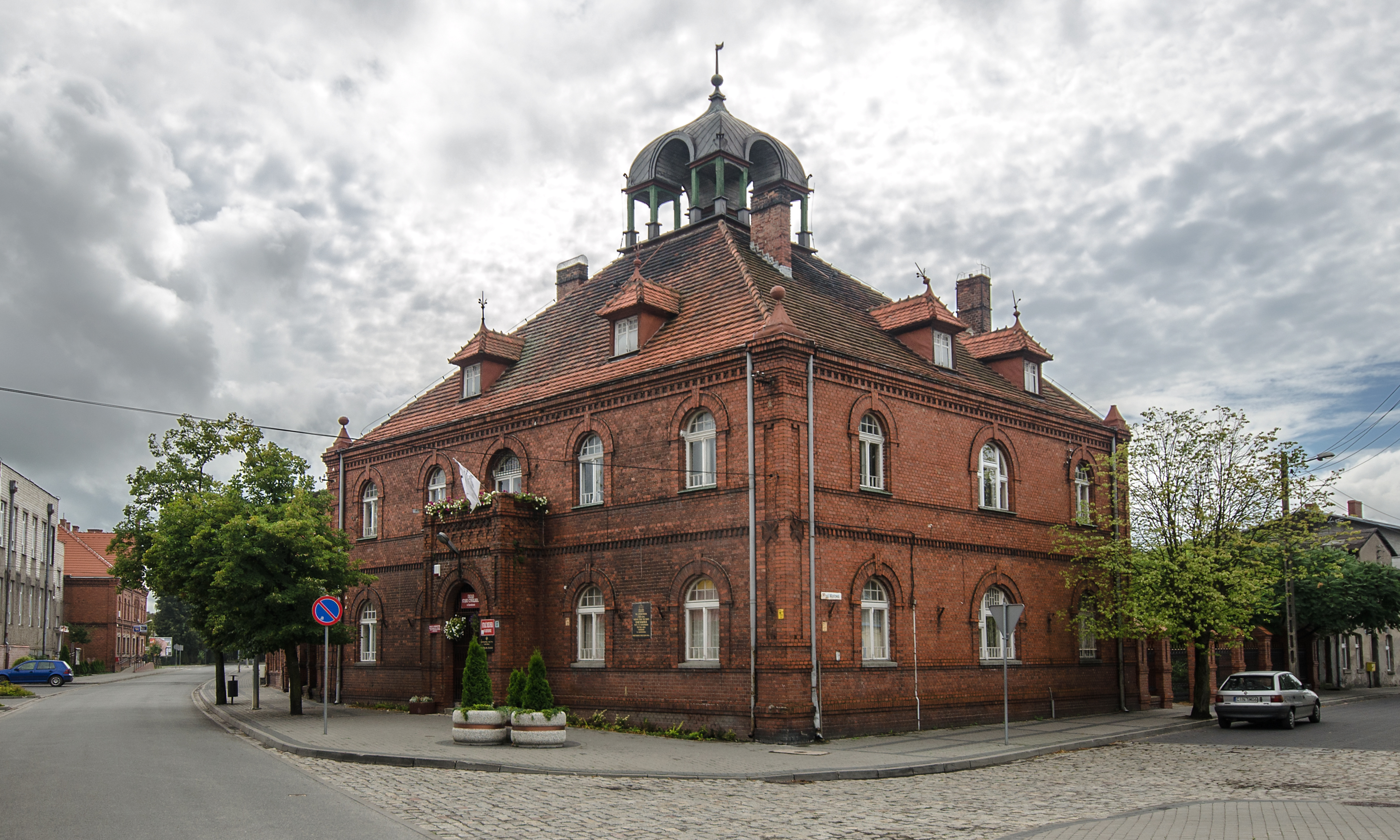
- Town hall in Gniewkowo

- Coat of arms

- Location within Poland
- Coordinates: 52°54′N 18°25′E
- Country: Poland
- Voivodeship: Kuyavian-Pomeranian
- County: Inowrocław
- Gmina: Gniewkowo
- First mentioned: 1185
- Town rights: 1268

Government
  - Mayor: Ilona Wodniak-Kuraszkiewicz

Area
  - Total: 9.18 km^{2} (3.54 sq mi)

Population (2006)
  - Total: 7,254
  - Density: 790/km^{2} (2,050/sq mi)
- Time zone: UTC+1 (CET)
  - Summer (DST): UTC+2 (CEST)
- Postal code: 88-140
- Area code: +48 52
- Car plates: CIN
- Website: http://www.gniewkowo.com.pl

Gniewkowo (Polish pronunciation: [ɡɲɛfˈkɔvɔ]) is a town in Inowrocław County, Kuyavian-Pomeranian Voivodeship, in north-central Poland with a population of 7,301 inhabitants (2005). It is located within the historic region of Kuyavia.

Founded in the Middle Ages and first recorded in 1185, from 1314 to 1364 Gniewkowo was the seat of a local line of the Piast dynasty, and then a royal town of Poland. During World War II, it was the site of German Nazi massacres of some 4,000 Poles. It is located on the Polish 353 railway line connecting Poznań with Toruń and Olsztyn.

== Location ==
Gniewkowo is located to the south of the Bydgoszcz forest on route 52, 15 km northeast of Inowrocław and 23 km southwest of Toruń.

== History ==
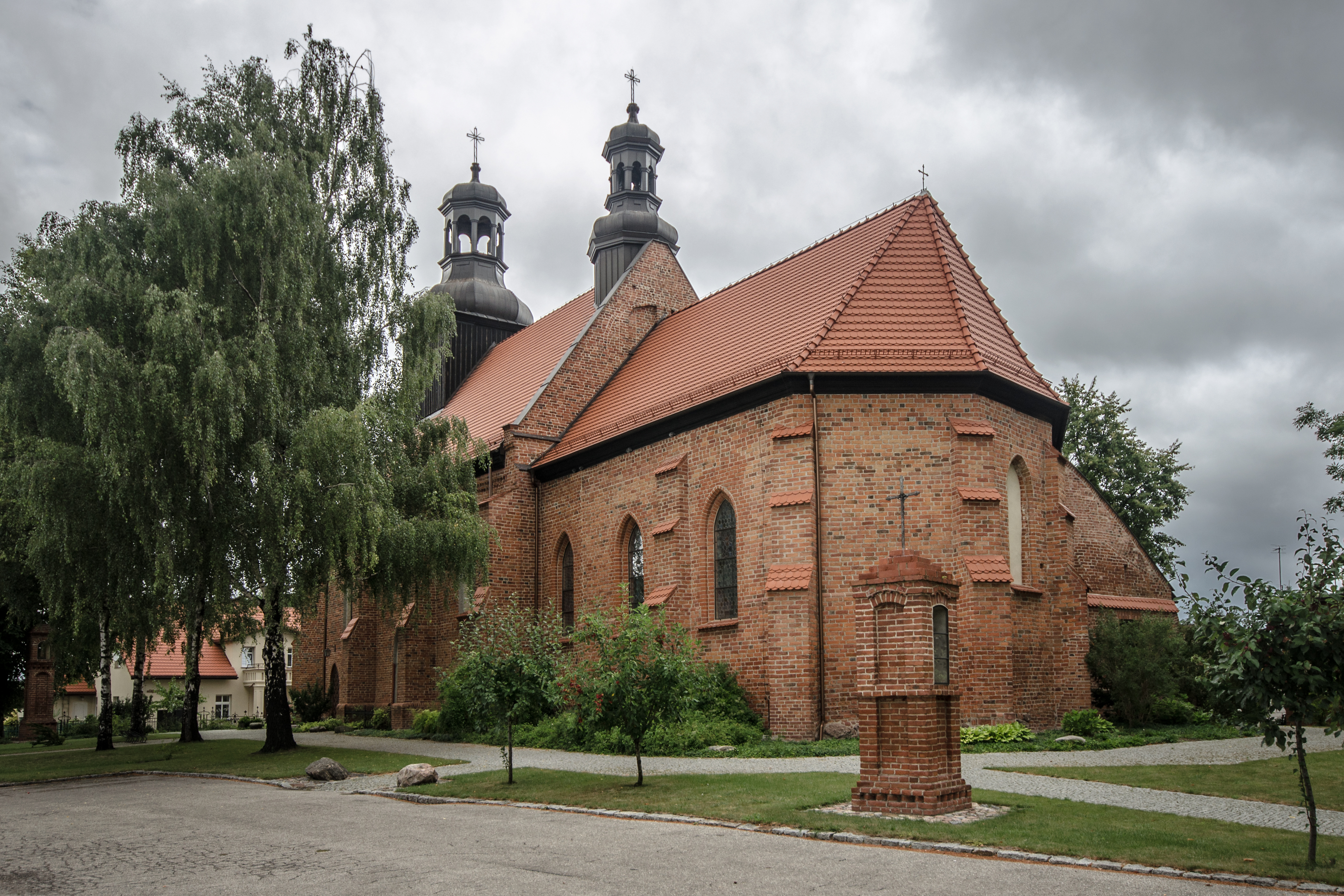
Gothic Saints Nicholas and Constantina church

Archaeological excavations have shown that the site was already populated by the Bronze Age. The first historical mention of the town dates from 1185. In 1268 the town was granted city rights. In 1314 Siemomysł of Inowrocław’s larger Kuyavia duchy was divided among his three sons; Casimir III of Kuyavia inherited the Gniewkowo region which became a small autonomous duchy. The Teutonic Knights laid siege to Gniewkowo in 1332 during their war with Poland. To avoid capture Casimir set fire to his stronghold and abandoned the town. He would not regain control of the duchy until the Treaty of Kalisz in 1343.

In 1364/1365, Władysław the White mortgaged Gniewkowo to Polish King Casimir III the Great. In 1408 the city hosted a meeting between Polish King Władysław II Jagiełło and the Teutonic Knights over the disputed Dobrzyń Land. From 1409 to 1411 Gniewkowo played an important role in the Polish–Lithuanian–Teutonic War. Gniewkowo was a royal town of the Kingdom of Poland, administratively located in the Inowrocław County in the Inowrocław Voivodeship in the Greater Poland Province.

Gniewkowo was ravaged by several fires during the 16th century, limiting its development. During the 17th and the 18th centuries, wars with Sweden and subsequent outbreaks of diseases laid waste to the town.

Gniewkowo was annexed by Prussia in 1772 after the first partition of Poland (but from 1807 to 1815 Gniewkowo was part of the Duchy of Warsaw), during which time the economy began to develop. Starting in 1843, a road linked the city to Inowrocław and Toruń. Jews and Germans became more and more prominent, while the local Polish population suffered from an official policy of discrimination and forced Germanisation. Part of Germany from 1871, in 1879 the German administration, following the Otto von Bismarck's policy of forced Germanisation of ancient Polish territories and their Slavic peoples, changed the name of the town to a German Argenau. A general strike broke out after German became the required official language for religious classes. Electricity became available citywide in 1908.

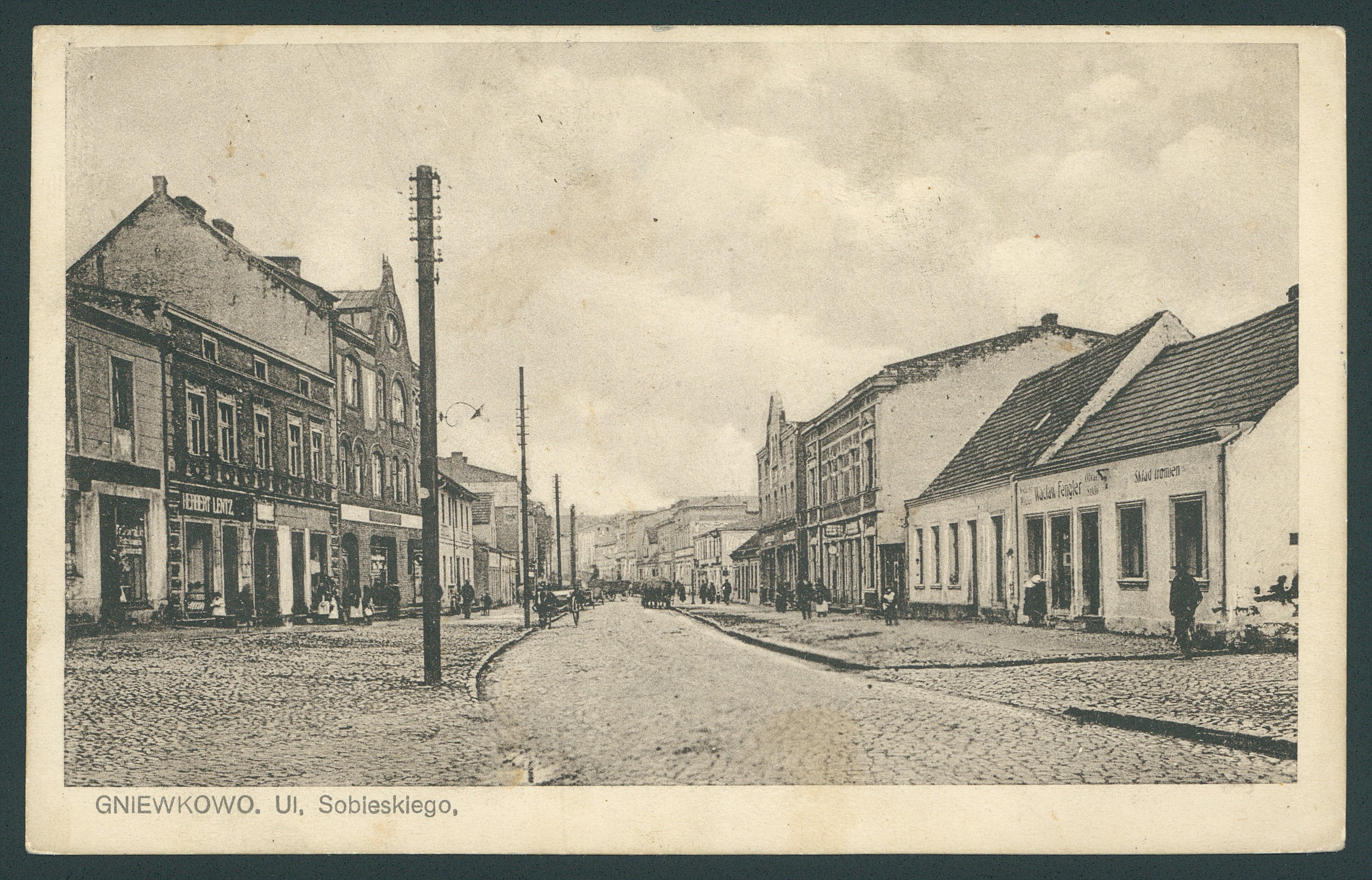
Gniewkowo in 1925

After World War I, in 1918, Poland regained independence, and afterwards the Greater Poland Uprising broke out, which goal was to reintegrate the region and town with the reborn Polish state. On January 17, 1920, after over a year of fighting, Gniewkowo was finally recaptured by Poles, and thus rejoined Poland. The town suffered greatly during the Polish economic crisis that followed World War I. On the eve of World War II the unemployment rate was 70%.

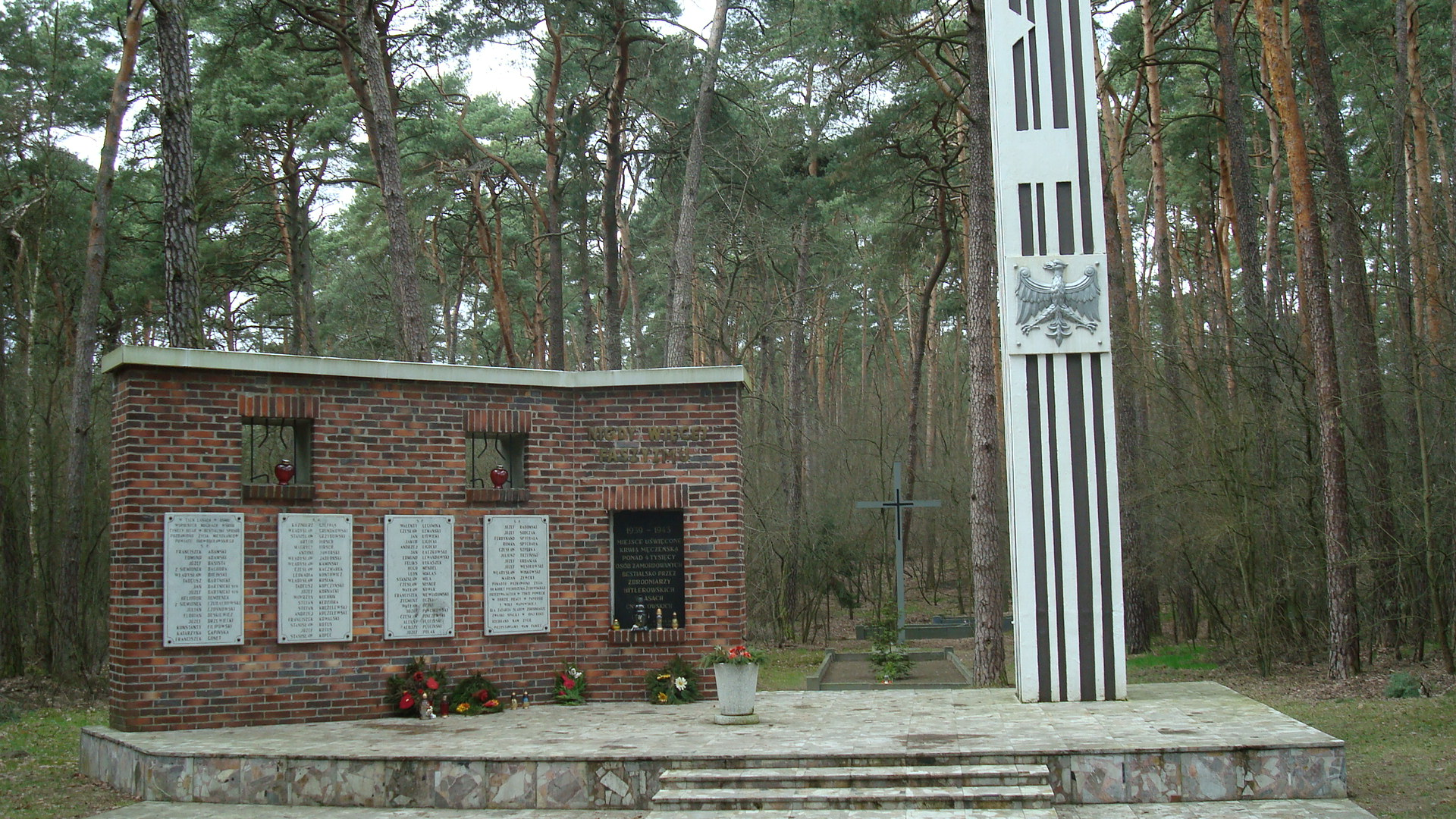
Memorial at the site of the German massacre of 4,000 Poles

During the German invasion of Poland, which started World War II, the town was captured by Germany on September 2, 1939. During the subsequent German occupation the local Polish population was subjected to various crimes, including massacres, expulsions, deportations to forced labour and to Nazi concentration camps. Already in September 1939, the Germans destroyed the pre-war monument to the Greater Poland Uprising participants. Around 4,000 Polish civilians taken from Gniewkowo and the nearby cities of Inowrocław, Bydgoszcz and Toruń were executed by the Nazi Germans in the woods surrounding the town. Among the victims were Polish teachers, principals, farmers, musicians, railwaymen, local officials (see Intelligenzaktion). Inhabitants of Gniewkowo were also among 56 Poles massacred in a prison in Inowrocław on October 22–23, 1939. In 1944–1945, the Germans also operated a female subcamp of the Stutthof concentration camp in the town. Polish and Soviet troops took Gniewkowo on January 21, 1945. The town was restored to Poland, although with a Soviet-installed communist regime, and thus begun the 44 years of Communist Poland. The Polish anti-communist resistance was active in Gniewkowo, including the nationwide Home Army, Freedom and Independence Association and Armed Forces Delegation for Poland, and several local units and organizations, focused on armed struggle, sabotage and intelligence.

In 1989 first, since 1939, free and democratic elections were held in Gniewkowo as in the rest of democratic Republic of Poland. Between 1978 and 1998 Gniewkowo belonged to Bydgoszcz Voivodeship and since the 1998 administrative reform belongs to Kuyavian-Pomeranian Voivodeship.
