= Władysław the White =

Duke of Gniewkowo

- Duke of Gniewkowo
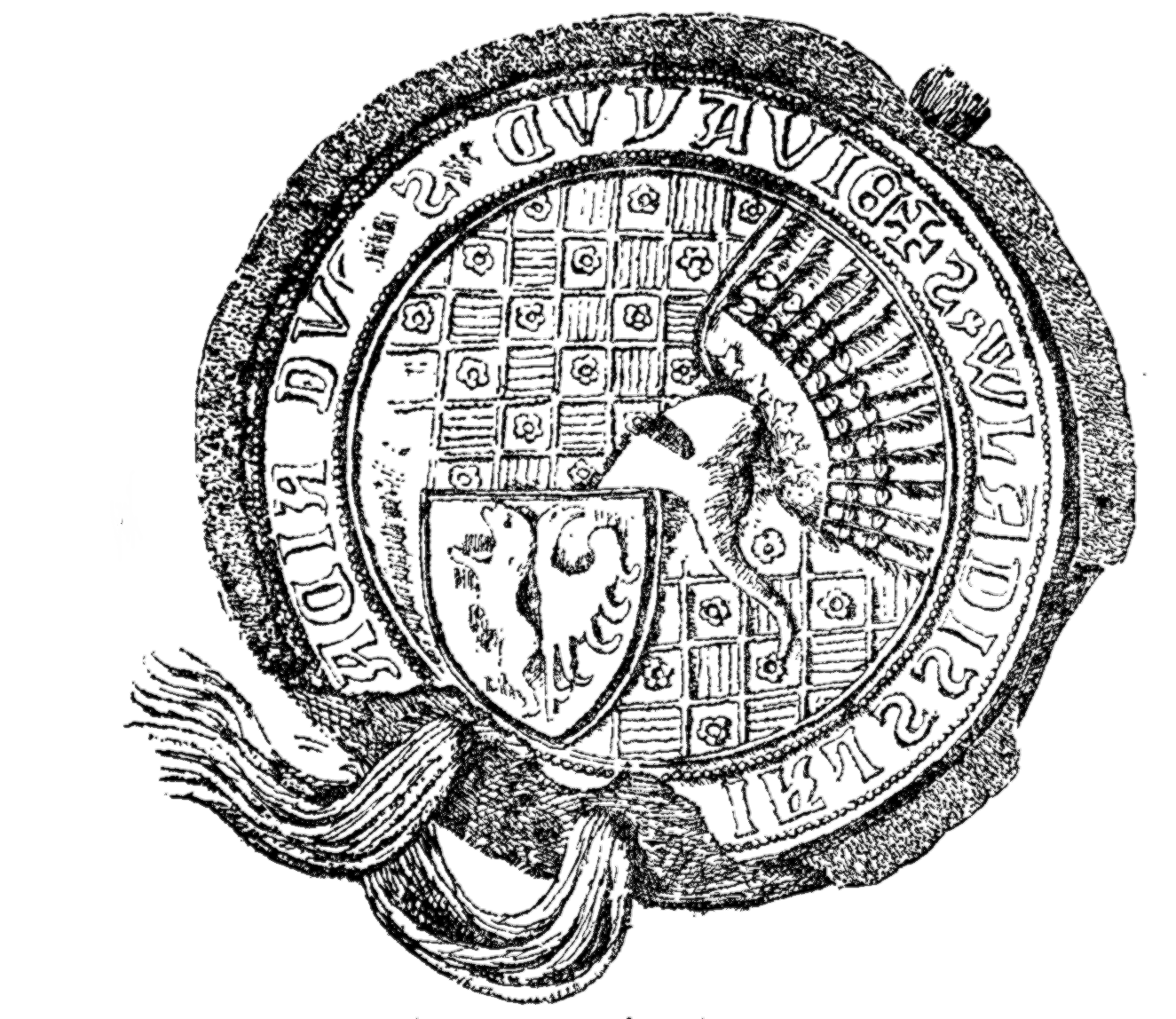
- Władysław the White's Seal, 1355.
- Born: ca. 1327/1333
- Died: 29 February 1388; Strasbourg
- Buried: Dijon Cathedral, France
- Noble family: Piast dynasty
- Spouse: Elizabeth of Strzelce
- Father: Kazimierz III of Gniewkowo
- Mother: unknown

Władysław the White (Polish: Władysław Biały or Włodko Gniewkowski; ca. 1327/1333 – 29 February 1388), also known in French as Ladislas Le Blanc, was a Polish prince and member of the House of Piast. He ruled as Duke of Gniewkowo during 1347/1350–1363/1364 (his final and official resignation was in 1377). He was the last male representative of Piast dynasty's Kuyavian line.

He was the only surviving son of Kazimierz III of Gniewkowo by his unknown wife.

== Life ==
=== Government of the Duchy of Gniewkowo ===
After his father's death, which occurred between 1347 and 1350, Władysław succeeded him as the last independent ruler of Gniewkowo, having recognized the overlordship of King Casimir III of Poland. Currently eight documents exist issued by Władysław during his reign as Duke of Gniewkowo; they show the full Latin version of his title: Wladislaus dei gracia dux Cuyavie et dominus Gnewkovie nec non Slonensis terrarum. Thus it is known that Władysław styled himself as Duke of Kuyavia and ruled over Gniewkowo and Słońsko.

The Ducal court of Gniewkowo had its own administrative apparatus, and the Ducal palace was built in the model of Wawel Castle.

Around 1 December 1359 Władysław married Elizabeth, the only daughter of Duke Albert of Strzelce, and a few months later, in March 1360, King Casimir III returned to him the ancestral district of Inowrocław, although only as a lifetime fief.

His wife Elisabeth died unexpectedly ca. 17 April 1361; Władysław, who deeply loved her, was grief-stricken and decided never to marry again.

Some time between 13 February 1362 and 1 March 1363, the Polish king forced him to return the fief of Inowrocław.

Between 29 May 1363 and 5 April 1364, Władysław decided to sell his domains to King Casimir III for 1,000 florins.

=== Pilgrimage, ordination as Cistercian and Benedictine monk ===
After leaving his Duchy, Władysław began a long pilgrimage. He visited Malbork (where he met the Grand Master of the Teutonic Order, Winrich von Kniprode, and joined his expedition to Lithuania), Prague, the Holy Land, and Avignon, where he met Pope Urban V. In June 1366 he entered the Cistercian Cîteaux Abbey; however, after only one year, he moved to the Benedictine monastery at Dijon.

=== Candidate for the Polish crown, fight in Kuyavia ===
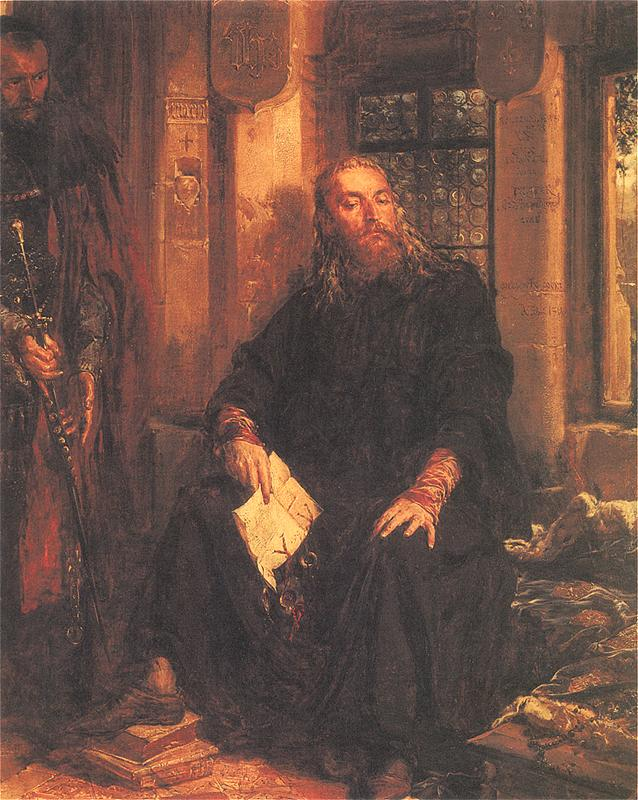
Władysław the White in Dijon, painting by Jan Matejko.

After King Casimir III's death in 1370, Władysław unexpectedly decided to take this opportunity to return to his ancestral Gniewkowo. To this end, he began several efforts before Pope Gregory XI to be released from his holy vows, but without results. Finally in November 1371 the Pope, under the pressure of King Louis I of Hungary, definitely refused the dispensation of his vows, and Władysław was forced to return to Dijon.

However, Władysław didn't give up to his pretensions, and on 8 September 1373 he secretly arrived to Gniezno and, with the support to the opposition of the Angevin rule, he quickly captured Włocławek, Inowrocław, Złotoria and even his former land of Gniewkowo. From them, he advanced his claims for the Polish crown as one of the closest Piast relatives of Casimir III. The response of King Louis I was immediate: Władysław, betrayed by his previous supporters, was forced by the starost of Greater Poland, Sędziwój Pałuka, to leave the country.

Władysław took refuge in the border city of Drezdenko, owned by the knight Ulrich von Osten. He remained there until 1375, when with the help of von Oseten and even Burgundian troops sent by Philip the Bold, invaded the fortresses of Złotoria, Raciąż and Gniewkowo. This time, both sides were better prepared for an armed conflict and they clashed at the Battle of Gniewków, where Władysław's forces defeated the Angevin troops. Władysław retreated to Nieszawa and then to Złotoria, where he organized marauded raids to the near suburbs and villages of Inowrocław and Greater Poland.

The counter-attack of King Louis I took place in June 1376, when he besieged with his army the fortress of Złotoria, where Władysław was injured during a duel with Bartosz Wezenborg. During the siege the ally of Louis I and grandson of Casimir III, Duke Casimir IV of Pomerania was also wounded; he died some months later as a consequence of his injuries.

=== Abdication, return to France, death ===
The final abandonment of Władysław's claims over the inheritance of Casimir III the Great and his ancestral domains came in March 1377, as a result of an agreement concluded at Brześć Kujawski. In exchange for the withdrawal of his claims, Władysław received 10,000 florins (in annual payments of 1,000), and the post of Abbot at Pannonhalma Archabbey in Hungary. When the king failed to pay the annual amount in October 1379, Władysław suddenly appeared in Gdańsk; only then did the alarmed Louis I pay him the rest of the promised amount. After this, Władysław moved to Lübeck and around April 1381 returned to the monastery at Dijon, where he purchased from the abbot the prebend, a proper house and a lifetime maintenance.

His turbulent life didn't end there, because when King Louis I died in 1382, Władysław again raised hopes to recover his patrimony. This could be the only explanation for the fact that by a document dated on 15 September 1382, he finally obtained the dispensation of his vows from Antipope Clement VII. However, and for unknown reasons, he never made another attempt to recover his Polish lands.

Certainly after 3 March 1383 Władysław left again the monastery of Dijon, this time for good; he died on 29 February in the city of Strasbourg. Until recently, the date of his death was established as 1 March 1388, but this was rightly corrected by Kazimierz Jasiński: on his tombstone inscription was noted Dni MCCC octuagesimo octavo 1 Kal. Martii, which means that Władysław died the day before 1 March 1388, and since 1388 was a leap year, 1 Kal. Martii was 29 February 1388.

According to Władysław's last will, he was buried in the Benedictine Abbey of St. Benignus in Dijon (now Dijon Cathedral), where to this day his beautiful tombstone is preserved. A commemorative plate was placed there in the 19th century by Prince Władysław Czartoryski. The inscription of the plate states that Władysław the White obtained the release of his vows in connection with his possible succession to the Polish crown.

The turbulent life of the last Piast-born Kuyavian prince fascinated even his contemporaries. For this reason, the monks of the Benedictine monastery in Dijon called him Le Roy Lancelot (King Lancelot), which referred to the hero of the series of Arthurian tales, one of the knights of the Round Table.
