= Złotoria, Kuyavian-Pomeranian Voivodeship =

Złotoria
- Village
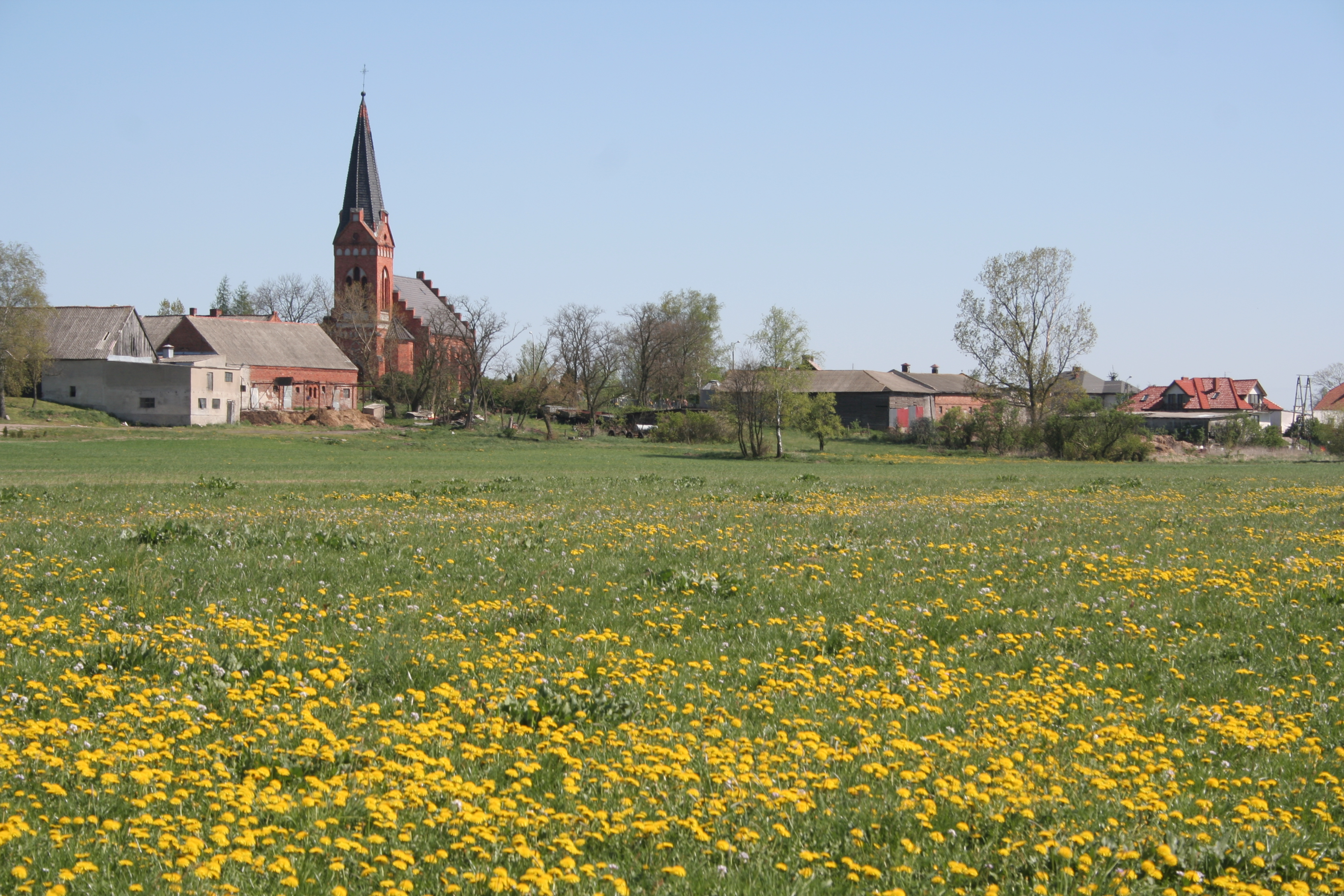
- Panorama of Złotoria with the Saint Adalbert church

- Location within Poland
- Coordinates: 52°59′N 18°42′E
- Country: Poland
- Voivodeship: Kuyavian-Pomeranian
- County: Toruń
- Gmina: Lubicz
- First mentioned: 1242
- Population (approx.): 1,700
- Time zone: UTC+1 (CET)
  - Summer (DST): UTC+2 (CEST)
- Vehicle registration: CTR

Złotoria [zwɔˈtɔrja] is a village in the administrative district of Gmina Lubicz, within Toruń County, Kuyavian-Pomeranian Voivodeship, in north-central Poland. It is located in the historic Dobrzyń Land.

== History ==
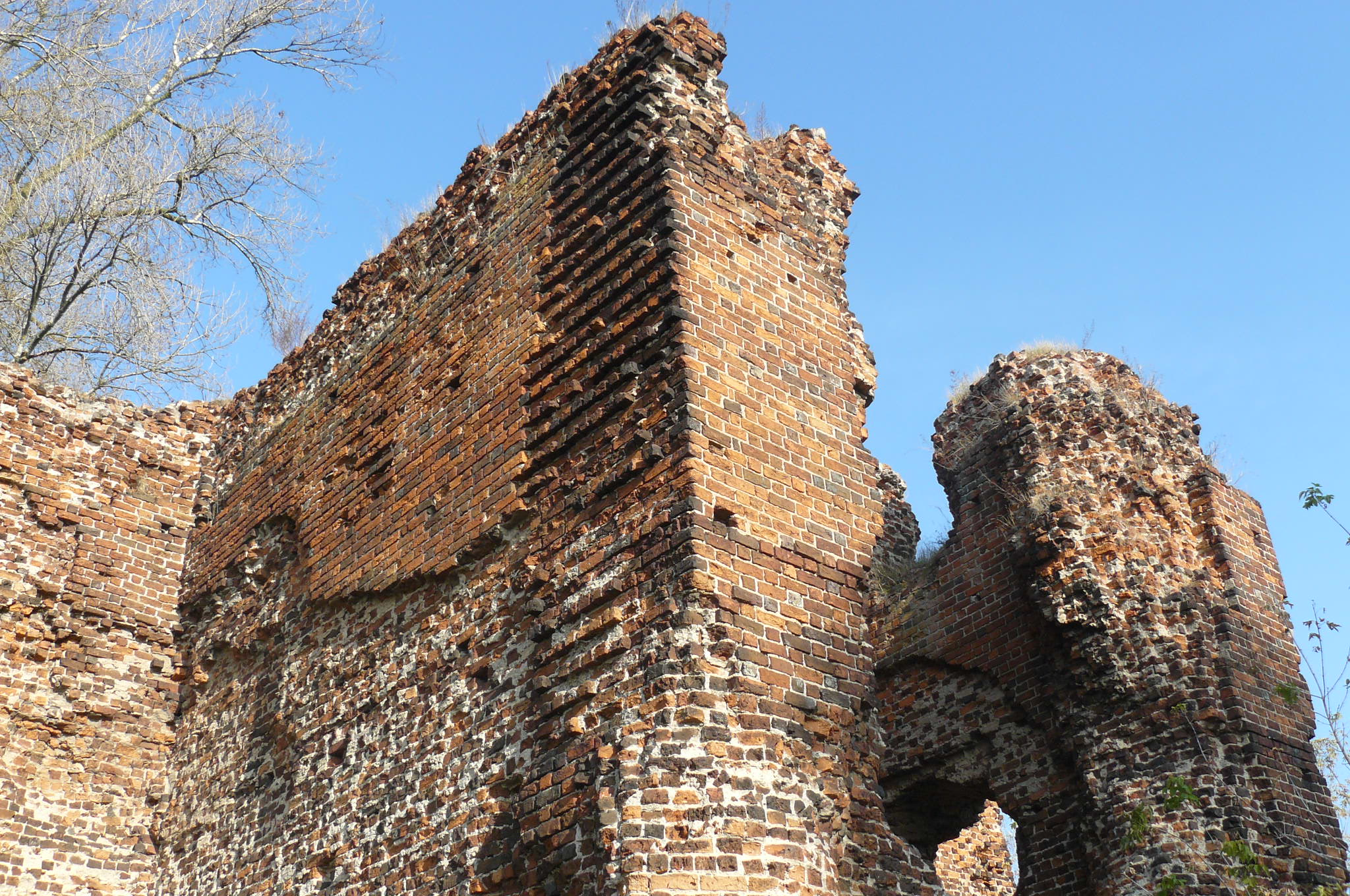
Ruins of the medieval castle

The village dates back to medieval Piast-ruled Poland. The oldest known mention in documents comes from 1242. In 1343, Polish King Casimir III the Great built a Royal castle in the village.

During the German occupation of Poland (World War II), in 1939, several Poles from Złotoria, including a teacher, farmers and sołtys (head of local administration) Bronisław Murawski, were murdered by the Germans during large massacres of Poles committed in the nearby Barbarka forest in Toruń as part of the Intelligenzaktion. In November 1940, the German Schutzpolizei carried out expulsions of Poles, who were placed in a transit camp in Toruń, and then either deported to the General Government in the more eastern part of German-occupied Poland or sent to forced labour, while their houses and farms were handed over to German colonists as part of the Lebensraum policy.

== Notable people ==
- Robert Kłos (born 1982), Polish football player
