= Flag of Masovian Voivodeship =

Flag of the Masovian Voivodeship, Poland

Flag of the Masovian Voivodeship
- Use: Masovian Voivodeship
- Proportion: 5:8
- Adopted: 29 May 2006 (current version); 8 June 2005 (first version)
- Design: Red rectangle with white eagle with yellow beak and legs, on the left side
- Designed by: Andrzej Heidrich (current version)

The flag of the Masovian Voivodeship, Poland is a red rectangle with silver (white) eagle, with golden (yellow) beak and legs, located on the left side of the flag.

== Design ==
The current flag of the Masovian Voivodeship is a red rectangle with the aspect ratio of height to width of 5:8. On its left side is located silver (white) eagle with golden (yellow) beak and legs. The eagle has been adopted from the coat of arms of the voivodeship, and was based on the coat of arms used by Masovian Voivodeship of the Kingdom of Poland, from 1526 to 1795.

== History ==
The banner used by the forces of duke Siemowit IV, during the Battle of Grunwald in 1410.

The banner used by the forces of duke Janusz I of Warsaw during the Battle of Grunwald in 1410.

In 1410, during the Battle of Grunwald, the forces of Siemowit IV, duke of the duchies of Płock, and Rawa, located in Masovia, used a red banner with a white eagle, with elevated wings, and its head turned left. In the same battle, the forces of Janusz I of Warsaw, duke of the Duchy of Warsaw, used a banner that was divided into 4 equal fields. The top left and bottom right fields were white, with a red dragon on them, while top right and bottom left fields were white with a red eagle on them.

Flag of the Masovian Voivodeship used from 2005 to 2006.

The first flag of the Masovian Voivodeship had been adopted by the Masovian Regional Assembly, on 8 June 2005. The flag was a red rectangle with the silver (white) eagle with golden (yellow) beak and legs, placed in the middle. The eagle has been taken from the coat of arms of the Masovian Voivodeship, which originally, was based on the seal used by Siemowit III, Duke of Masovia in 14th century. That design of the coat of arms had been criticized by the Heraldic Commission, for not having a significant historical connection to Masovia. Additionally, it was brought to attention that the coat of arms used the similar design of the eagle, to the one used in the coat of arms of the town of Oborniki, Poland. As such, both coat of arms and flag, had been redesigned in 2006. The new versions had been created by graphic designer Andrzej Heidrich, and officially approved on 29 May 2006. The design of the eagle had been changed, to one based on the coat of arms of the Masovian Voivodeship of the Kingdom of Poland, used from 1526 to 1795. Additionally, the colour of the flag had been changed to darker shade, while the eagle, moved to the left side of the flag.

The flag is recognized as a property of the Masovian Voivodeship, with its usage protected by the law. Until 2021, its usage had been limited to the official institutions, however since then, the flag had been allowed for the private usage of the voivodeship inhabitants. Such decision had been made as part of an effort to promote the local identity among the voivodeship population.

== See also ==
- coat of arms of the Masovian Voivodeship
