= 1368 Lithuanian raid on Mazovia =

| Date | 1368 |
| Location | Mazovia |
| Result | Pułtusk being captured and burned down |

Belligerents
| Grand Duchy of Lithuania | Kingdom of Poland: Duchy of Warsaw; Duchy of Rawa; Duchy of Czersk |

Commanders and leaders
| Kęstutis | Siemowit III |

1368 Lithuanian raid on Mazovia was an attack of the Grand Duchy of Lithuania on the duchies of Warsaw, Czersk, and Rawa, that were the fielfdoms of the Kingdom of Poland, that took place in 1369. It was led by Kęstutis, Grand Duke of Lithuania. During the attack, following the short-lasting siege, Lithuanian forces had captured Pułtusk and castle within it, that was owned by the Płock bishop. The invaders burned down the city, after what they had retreated to Lithuania, before Siemowit III, Duke of Masovia, could organize the counterattack.

== Bibliography ==
- Słownik wojen, bitew i potyczek w średniowiecznej Polsce by Piotr Bunar and Stanisław A. Sroka. Kraków, Universitas publishing house.
