= Symbols of Warsaw West County =

Coat of arms of Warsaw West County
- Adopted: 19 September 2012 (current version); 30 June 2000 (first version)
- Use: Warsaw West County

Warsaw West County
- Use: Warsaw West County
- Proportion: 5:8
- Adopted: 19 September 2012 (current flag); 30 June 2000 (first flag)

The coat of arms and the flag that serve as the symbols of the Warsaw West County, Masovian Voivodeship, in east-central Poland.

== Design ==
The coat of arms is an Iberian style escutcheon, with square top and rounded base, that is divided in the 2 by 2 chessboard pattern, that alternate between red and white (silver) fields. The top left and bottom right fields of the shield are red, while, the top right, and bottom left, white (silver). The red fields feature a white (silver) eagle with yellow (golden) beak, legs, stripes on its wings, and a ring on its tail. The white fields feature Piast Dragon, a green dragon with red tongue, and legs.

The flag is a rectangle divided in the middle into four equal rectangles, that alternate between red and white (silver) fields. The top left and bottom right fields are red, while, the top right, and bottom left, white (silver). The red fields feature a white (silver) eagle with yellow (golden) beak, legs, stripes on its wings, and a ring on its tail. The white fields feature Piast Dragon, a green dragon with red tongue, and legs.

== History ==
The coat of arms and the flag of the Warsaw West County were established on 30 June 2000. The design of the coat of arms had been based on the design of the coat of arms of the duke Janusz I of Warsaw, who ruled the Duchy of Warsaw, from between 1373 and 1374 to 1429. It was present on the banner used by his forces during the Battle of Grunwald. The eagle present in the coat of arms was a symbol of the Duchy of Masovia, originally used by duke Siemowit III in 14th century, while a Piast Dragon, a symbol of the Duchy of Czersk. The dragon used by Czersk was green, however the banner used by duke Janusz I, was red. The county in its coat of arms, used the original green design instead, of the one present in the banner.

The civil flag was a rectangle divided in the middle into four equal rectangles. The top left and bottom right fields were white (silver), while top right field was red, and bottom left, was green. The state flag additionally featured the coat of arms of the county placed in the middle.

On 19 September 2012, the county had redesigned its coat of arms. It included changing the design of the eagle and the dragon present on it. It also had established the current design of the flag.

== Gallery ==
The coat of arms of West Warsaw County used from 2000 to 2012.

The civil flag of Warsaw West County, used from 2000 to 2012

The state flag of Warsaw West County, used from 2000 to 2012
