= Duchy of Wizna =

14th and 15th century duchy in Masovia

Duchy of Wizna Księstwo wiskie (Polish) Ducatus Wisnensis (Latin)
- 1345–1351; 1381–1382; 1435–1495
- Flag Coat of arms

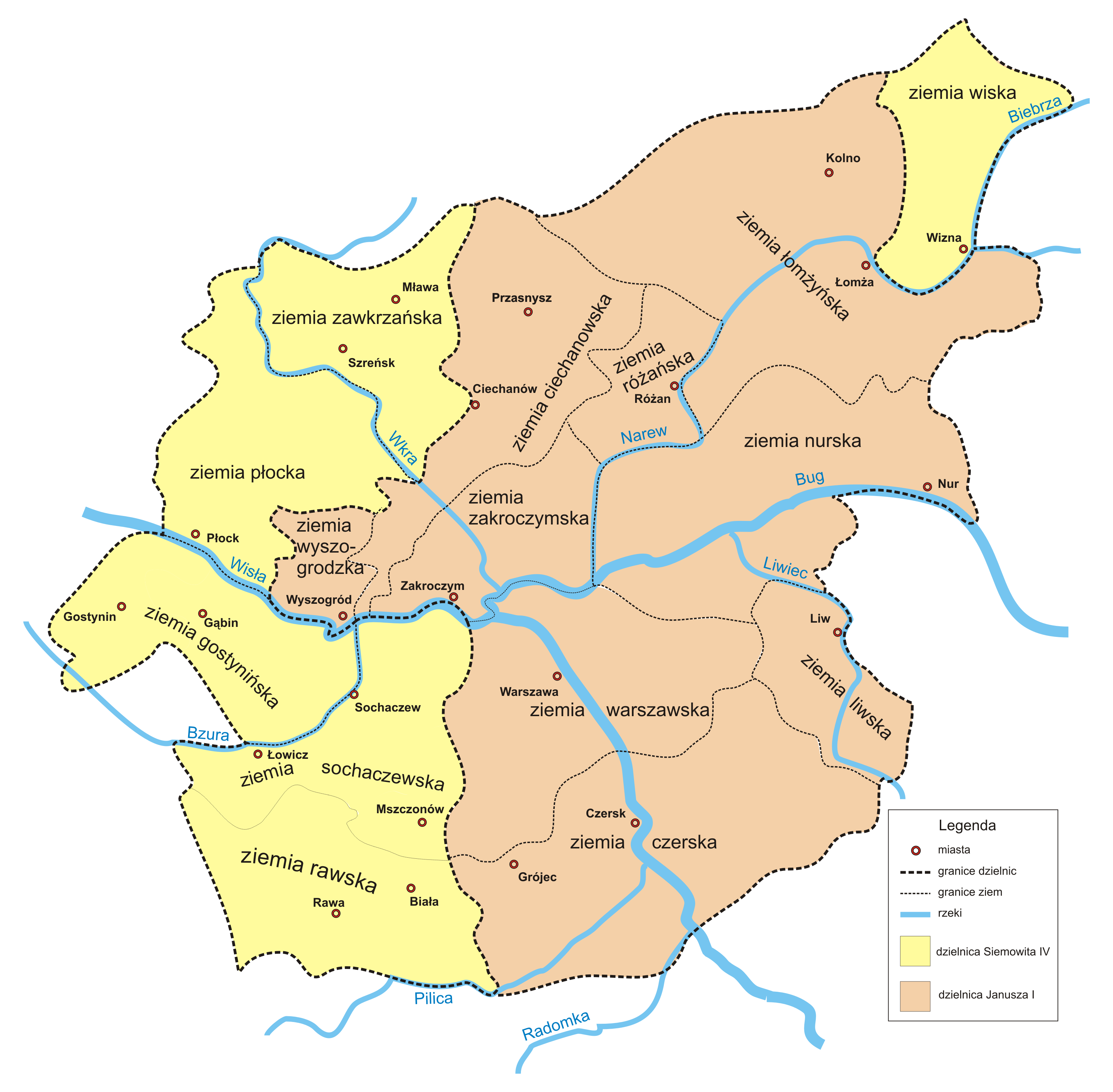
- Map of Masovia between 1381 and 1426, with division between lands controlled by Siemowit IV and Janusz I of Warsaw, including Duchy of Wizna.
- Status: Fiefdom of the Kingdom of Poland (1345–1351, 1381–1382); Fiefdom of the Kingdom of Poland (1435–1495); Personal union with the Duchy of Płock
- Capital: Wizna
- Official languages: Polish, Latin
- Religion: Roman Catholic
- Government: District principality
- Duke
  - 1345–1351 (first): Bolesław III of Płock
  - 1381–1382 (second): Siemowit IV
  - 1435–1495 (third and last): Władysław I of Płock
- Historical era: High Middle Ages
  - Partition from the Duchy of Rawa: 1345
  - Incorporation into the Kingdom of Poland: 18 September 1351
  - Partition from Duchy of Masovia: December 1381
  - Pledge to the State of the Teutonic Order: 2 December 1382
  - Partition from the Duchy of Warsaw: 1435
  - Incorporation into the Kingdom of Poland.: 1495
Preceded by
Duchy of Rawa
Duchy of Masovia
Duchy of Warsaw
Succeeded by
United Kingdom of Poland
State of the Teutonic Order
Crown of the Kingdom of Poland

Duchy of Wizna (Note: Polish: Księstwo wiskie; Latin: Ducatus Wisnensis) was a district principality and a fiefdom within the United Kingdom of Poland, and later the Crown of the Kingdom of Poland. The country was located in Wizna Land with Wizna as its capital and during its existence it remained in the personal union with the Duchy of Płock. It was formed in 1345 from the part of Duchy of Rawa and was ruled by Bolesław III of Płock. On 18 September 1381 it was incorporated into United Kingdom of Poland. It was reestablished in December 1381 from the part of the Duchy of Masovia under Siemowit IV rule. On 2 December 1382 its territory was pledged to the State of the Teutonic Order. It was again re-established in 1435, when it was given to Władysław I of Płock, ruler of the Duchy of Płock, existed until 1495 when it was incorporated into the Crown of the Kingdom of Poland.

== History ==
Following the death of the ruler of the Duchy of Rawa, Siemowit II of Masovia, on 18 February 1345, Bolesław III of Płock had inherited from him lands of Sochaczew, Gostynin and Wizna. While the first two were incorporated into the Duchy of Płock, the later one was reformed into Duchy of Wizna, remaining in the personal union with Płock. After Bolesław III's death in 1351, on 18 September, the duchy was inherited by the king Casimir III the Great and incorporated into the Kingdom of Poland. In 1370 the territories of the former duchy were transferred to the Duchy of Masovia.

In December 1381, following the death of his father, Siemowit IV had inherited Wizna Land reestablishing the state. On 2 December 1382, he had pledged the lands of the duchy to the State of the Teutonic Order in exchange of 7 000 grzywnas. In November 138 Siemowit IV had longed the period of the pledge in the exchange for 60 000 Prague groschen. In December 1401, he had bought back the Wizna Land from the State of the Teutonic Order which he impliedly pledged to his brother, Janusz I of Warsaw, ruler of the Duchy of Warsaw, for the duration of 9 years. Despite that, Siemowit IV had continued to title himself the Duke of Wizna, while his brother remained from developing the administration and investing in the territory until 1410. The land had remained under Warsaw control until 1435, when it was given to Władysław I of Płock, ruler of the Duchy of Płock and remained in the personal union with the state until 1495 when it was incorporated into the Kingdom of Poland.

== List of rulers ==
- Bolesław III of Płock (1345–1351)
- Siemowit IV (1381–1382)
- Władysław I of Płock (1435–1495)

== Bibliography ==
- Balzer O. Genealogia Piastów. Kraków. 1895.
- Wyrozumski J. Dzieje Polski piastowskiej (VIII w.-1370). Kraków. „Fogra”. 1999. ISBN 83-85719-38-5, OCLC 749221743.
