= Masovian Province =

Masovian Province may refer to:

- Mazovia, a historical region of Poland with the capital in Warsaw
- the Duchy of Masovia, a historical state in Poland, to 1526
- Masovian Voivodeship, a present-day division of Poland, as well as other units existing after 1526
