= District duchy =

Type of medieval and early modern polity

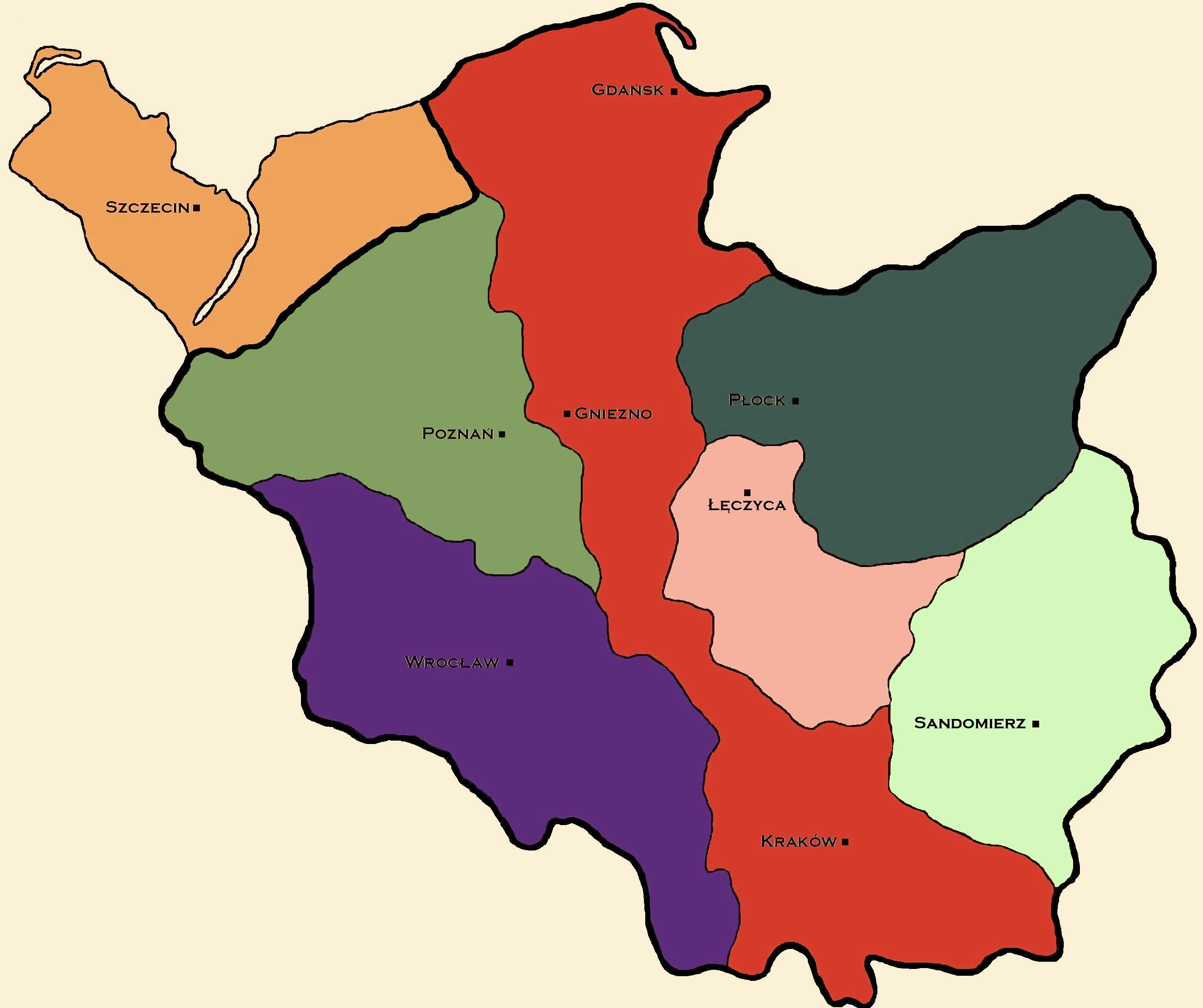
Fragmentation of Poland in 1138

The district duchy, also known as a district principality, was a type of state under the patrimonial system, such as a duchy or principality, formed in the feudal system as a result of a land partition between the members of a royal family (Feudal fragmentation). It occurred in the Middle Ages and early modern period, notably in Europe, in states such as the Holy Roman Empire, Duchy of Poland, and Kievan Rus'.

== Holy Roman Empire ==
=== Bavaria ===
- Bavaria-Ingolstadt
- Bavaria-Landshut
- Bavaria-Munich
- Bavaria-Straubing

=== Mecklenburg ===
- Mecklenburg-Güstrow
- Mecklenburg-Schwerin
- Mecklenburg-Stargard
- Mecklenburg-Strelitz

=== Palatinate ===
- Palatinate-Birkenfeld
- Palatinate-Birkenfeld-Bischweiler
- Palatinate-Birkenfeld-Gelnhausen
- Palatinate-Birkenfeld-Zweibrücken
- Palatinate-Kleeburg
- Palatinate-Landsberg
- Palatinate-Lautern
- Palatinate-Mosbach
- Palatinate-Mosbach-Neumarkt
- Palatinate-Neuburg
- Palatinate-Neumarkt
- Palatinate-Simmern
- Palatinate-Simmern and Zweibrücken
- Palatinate-Simmern-Kaiserslautern
- Palatinate-Simmern-Sponheim
- Palatinate-Sulzbach
- Palatinate-Sulzbach-Hilpoltstein
- Palatinate-Zweibrücken
- Palatinate-Zweibrücken-Birkenfeld
- Palatinate-Zweibrücken-Vohenstrauss-Parkstein

=== Pomerania ===
- Pomerania-Demmin
- Pomerania-Stettin
- Pomerania-Schlawe
- Pomerania-Wolgast
- Pomerania-Stolp
- Pomerania-Neustettin
- Pomerania-Stargard
- Pomerania-Barth
- Pomerania-Rügenwalde
- Pomerania-Wolgast-Stolp

=== Saxony and Thuringia ===
- Saxe-Altenburg
- Saxe-Coburg
- Saxe-Coburg-Eisenach
- Saxe-Coburg-Saalfeld
- Saxe-Eisenberg
- Saxe-Coburg-Gotha
- Saxe-Eisenach
- Saxe-Gotha
- Saxe-Gotha-Altenburg
- Saxe-Hildburghausen
- Saxe-Jena
- Saxe-Marksuhl
- Saxe-Meiningen
- Saxe-Römhild
- Saxe-Saalfeld
- Saxe-Weimar
- Saxe-Weimar-Eisenach

== Poland ==
=== Original division ===
- Seniorate Province (later reformed into the Duchy of Kraków)
- Duchy of Greater Poland
- Duchy of Sandomierz
- Duchy of Masovia
- Duchy of Silesia

=== Greater Poland ===
- Duchy of Poznań
- Duchy of Gniezno
- Duchy of Kalisz

=== Sandomierz ===
- Duchy of Wiślica

=== Masovia ===
- Duchy of Czersk
- Duchy of Płock
- Duchy of Warsaw
- Duchy of Rawa
- Duchy of Belz
- Duchy of Wizna

=== Kuyavia ===
- Duchy of Łęczyca
- Duchy of Sieradz
- Duchy of Brześć Kujawski
- Duchy of Inowrocław
- Duchy of Bydgoszcz and Wyszogród
- Duchy of Gniewkowo
- Duchy of Dobrzyń

== Pomerelia ==
- Duchy of Gdańsk
- Duchy of Świecie and Lubiszewo
- Duchy of Białogarda
- Duchy of Lubiszewo
- Duchy of Świecie
