= Personal union =

Situation of two states sharing a monarch without merging

A personal union is a combination of two or more monarchical states that have the same monarch, while their boundaries, laws, and interests remain distinct. A real union, by contrast, involves the constituent states being to some extent interlinked, such as by sharing some limited governmental institutions. It differs from a federation in that each constituent state has an independent government, whereas a federal state is united by a central government. The ruler in a personal union does not need to be a hereditary monarch. (Note: In the Holy Roman Empire, many prince-bishops had themselves elected to separate prince-bishoprics, which they ruled in a personal union. For example, Joseph Clemens of Bavaria (1671–1723) was Prince-Bishop of Freising (1685–1694), Prince-Bishop of Regensburg (1685–1694), Prince-Elector of Cologne (1688–1723), Prince-Bishop of Liège (1694–1723) and Prince-Bishop of Hildesheim (1702–1723).)

== Concept ==
The term was coined by German jurist Johann Stephan Pütter, introducing it into Elementa iuris publici germanici (Elements of German Public Law) of 1760.

Personal unions can arise for several reasons, such as:

- inheritance through a dynastic union, e.g., Louis X of France inherited France from his father and Navarre from his mother
- decolonization, where ex-colonies install the monarch of the former colonizing power as their own upon becoming independent
- autonomization, e.g., instead of annexing Finland into the Russian Empire, Alexander I of Russia organized Finland as an autonomous grand duchy and acted as its head of state

They can also be codified (i.e., the constitutions of the states clearly express that they shall share the same person as head of state) or non-codified, in which case they can easily be broken (e.g., by the death of the monarch when the two states have different succession laws).

The concept of a personal union has only very rarely crossed over from monarchies into republics.

The 15 Commonwealth realms, which share Charles III as their head of state, have sometimes been described as being in personal union, a form of personal union, (Note: F.R. Scott stated, "the common kinship within the British group today establishes a form of personal union, the members of which are legally capable of following different international policies even in time of war.") and a shared monarchy, among other terms, (Note: W.Y. Elliott stated, "if a personal union be chosen, the Crown will be forced to act on the king's own discretion [and], since personal discretion in a modern monarch is unthinkable, the only alternative would be a league of states with a common, but symbolic crown", and Alexander N. Sack stated, "whatever the future development of the British Commonwealth may be, [it] can be described as that of associations or unions of states, as distinguished from 'personal' unions, on the one hand, and federal States, on the other.) though there has been no agreement on which term is most accurate.

The only other case of personal union today is that one of the co-princes of Andorra is the President of France.

== Monarchies in personal union ==
=== Africa ===
==== Congo Free State and Belgium ====
- Personal union with Belgium from 1885 to 1908, when the Congo Free State became a Belgian colony. The only sovereign during this period was Leopold II, who continued as king of Belgium until his death a year later in 1909.

=== Asia ===
==== Near East ====
- During the reign of Sargon II and Sennacherib, Babylon and Assyria were two countries connected via the same ruler.

==== Georgia ====
- Kingdom of Iberia and Colchis were connected power of the monarch in the years 300–90 BCE (Pharnavazid dynasty).
- Kingdom of Pontus and Colchis were connected power of the monarch in 109 BCE-64 CE.
- 1000–1010 Kingdom of Abkhazia and Iberia ruled by Bagrat III. In 1010 it united (together with the annexed Kakheti kingdom) into a single Kingdom of Georgia.
- Kingdom of Kakheti and Hereti were connected power of the monarch in 1020s–1104.
- Principality of Mingrelia and Principality of Abkhazia in the 1557–1660 years under the rule of the House of Dadiani.
- Kingdom of Kartli and Kingdom of Kakheti united under the rule of a single monarch in 1513–1518 (David X), 1625–1633 (Teimuraz I), 1648–1658 (Rostom), 1723 (Constantine II/III), to finally unite the Kingdom of Kartli-Kakheti in 1762 under the reign of Heraclius II and his descendants.
- Kingdom of Imereti and Principality of Guria united under the rule of a single monarch in 1681–1683 (George III Gurieli), 1701–1702, 1713–1714 (Mamia III Gurieli) and 1716 (George IV Gurieli).

==== Goryeo ====
- Personal union with Shenyang in the Mongol Empire (1308–1313; 1345-1351)
  - As King of Goryeo (高麗國王) and Prince/King of Shenyang (瀋陽王) in 1308–1310
  - As King of Goryeo and Prince/King of Shen (瀋王) in 1310–1313, 1345-1351

King Chungseon of Goryeo reigned as King of Goryeo in 1298 and 1308–1313 and as King of Shenyang or King of Shen from 1307 (according to the History of Yuan) or 1308 (according to Goryeosa) to 1316. At that time, Goryeo had already become a vassal of the Mongol Empire and the Mongol imperial family following the Mongol invasions of Korea and the Goryeo royal family had established strong ties by intermarrying with the Mongol imperial family. Because King Chungseon was a very powerful man during the reign of Külüg Khan, Külüg Khan gave him a new title on top of his kingship of Goryeo, the Prince/King of Shenyang, (Note: In English, the title wang (王) can be translated as both "prince" (秦王 or Prince of Qin, Emperor Taizong of Tang's title until Xuanwu Gate Incident) and "king" (魏王 or King of Wei, Cao Cao's title at the time of his death).) (Note: 瀋陽王 (Simplified Chinese: 沈阳王, Pinyin: Shěnyáng Wáng; 심양왕; Simyang Wang).) in 1307 or 1308 specifically mentioned as thanks to his efforts of bringing the Khan to power.

However, he lost his power in the Mongol imperial court after the death of the Külüg Khan. Because the Mongol Empire made Chungseon abdicate the crown of the Goryeo in 1313, the personal union was ended. King Chungsuk, Chungseon's eldest son, became the new King of Goryeo. In 1316, the Mongol Empire made Chungseon abdicate the crown of Shen in favour of Wang Ko, one of his nephews, resulting in him becoming the new King of Shen.

Following Wang Ko's death, Chungmok of Goryeo and Chungjeong of Goryeo were also dual rulers of both Goryeo and Shenyang from 1345-1351.

==== Saudi-Arabia ====
- The Kingdom of Hejaz and the Sultanate of Nejd were connected by Ibn Saud (1926–1932) following the Saudi conquest of Hejaz until the Proclamation of the Kingdom of Saudi Arabia.

=== Europe ===
==== Albania ====
- Medieval Albanian Kingdom personal union with the Kingdom of Naples (1272–1368).
- Modern Albanian Kingdom personal union with the Kingdom of Italy (1939–1943).

==== Andorra ====
Due to Andorra's special government form resulting from the Paréage of 1278, it is a diarchy with co-princes. One of them is the Bishop of Urgell; the other was originally the Count of Foix. It is through this feudal co-prince system that the Principality has entered partial personal union with:

- Kingdom of Navarre (1479–1620, then integrated into France).
- Kingdom of France (1589–1792, 1814–1815, 1815–1830, 1830–1848).

In 1607, the feudal co-prince was Henry IV of France, who issued an edict that his position should be held by the French Head of State. While the new government did not take up the title during the French Revolution, all polities of France since 1806 regardless of their government form have accepted that their head of state is an ex officio co-prince. This led to personal unions with:

- First and Second French Empires (1806–1814, 1815 and 1852–1870).
- Second, Third, Fourth and Fifth Republics of France (1848–1852, 1870–1940, 1944–1958, since 1958).
- French State (known as Vichy France, 1940–1944, in dispute with Free France).

==== Austria ====
- Personal union with Lands of the Bohemian Crown (1260–1276, 1306–1307, 1438–1439, 1453–1457, and 1526–1918).
- Personal union with Lands of the Hungarian Crown (1437–1439, 1444–1457, and 1526–1918).

==== Bohemia ====
- Personal union with Poland under Polish occupation (1003–1004).
- Personal union with Poland (1296–1306) and Hungary (1305).
- Personal union with Luxembourg (1313–1378, 1383–1388).
- Personal union with Hungary 1419–1437 (Sigismund of Luxemburg) and 1490–1526 (Jagellon dynasty).
- Personal union with Austria and Hungary 1438–1439 (Albert II of Germany), 1453–1457 (Ladislaus the Posthumous) and 1526–1918 (disputed during 1619–1620 by Frederick of Palatine and 1741–1743 by Charles Albert).

==== Brandenburg ====
- Personal union with the Principality of Ansbach (1415 to 1440, 1470 to 1486).
- Personal union with the Duchy of Prussia from 1618, when Albert Frederick, Duke of Prussia, died without male heirs and his son-in-law John Sigismund, Elector of Brandenburg, became ruler of both countries. Brandenburg and Prussia maintained separate governments and seats of power in Berlin and Königsberg respectively until 1701, when Frederick I consolidated them into one government.

==== Catalonia ====
- Personal union, as the Principality of Catalonia, with the Kingdom of Aragon (1173) the Kingdom of Mallorca (1229), and the Kingdom of Valencia (1238) constituting together the Crown of Aragon (1162-1715)
- Personal union with the Monarchy of Spain (1516–1714)
- Personal union with the Kingdom of France (1641–1652)

==== Croatia ====
- Personal union with the Kingdom of Hungary (1102–1918).

==== Denmark ====
Personal union with:

- Norway (986–995, 1000–1014, 1028–1035, 1042–1047, 1380–1397, 1397–1523 (Kalmar Union) and 1524–1814 (Denmark–Norway)).
- England (1013–1014, 1018–1035 (North Sea Empire) and 1040–1042).
- Duchy of Estonia (1240-1329, 1340–1346).
- Sweden (1397–1523) (Kalmar Union).
- Duchy of Schleswig (1086–1364, 1460–1864) and County/Duchy of Holstein (1460–1864).
- County of Oldenburg (1448, 1667–1773).
- County of Palatinate-Neumarkt (1443–1448).
- Rügen (1814).
- Duchy of Saxe-Lauenburg (1814–1864).
- Iceland (1918–1944).

==== England ====
Personal union, as Kingdom of England, with:

- Denmark (1013–1014, 1018–1035 (North Sea Empire) and 1040–1042).
- Duchy of Normandy (1066–1087, 1106–1144, 1154–1204/1259).
- County of Anjou (1154–1204).
- Much of France (Angevin Empire) (1154–1214).
- Aquitaine (1154–1453).
- Principality of Wales (1284–1542).
- Kingdom of France (1422–1453). See also: Dual monarchy of England and France.
- Lordship of Ireland (1171–1542) and Kingdom of Ireland (both legally subordinate) (1542–1649, 1660–1707).
- Monarchy of Spain (1556–1558).
- Kingdom of Scotland (1603–1649, 1660–1707).^{1}
- Principality of Orange and the Dutch Republic (1689–1702).

^{1}: After 1707, see Great Britain below.

==== France ====
- Personal union, as part of the Angevin Empire, with the Kingdom of England (1154–1214).
- Personal union with the Kingdom of England (1422–1453). See also: Dual monarchy of England and France.
- Personal union with the Kingdom of Naples under the rule of Charles VIII (1495) and Louis XII (1501–1504).
- Personal union with the Duchy of Milan under the rule of Louis XII (1499–1500 and 1500–1512) and Francis I (1515–1521 and 1524–1525).
- Personal union with the Kingdom of Scotland under the rule of Francis II (1559–1560).
- Personal union with the Polish–Lithuanian Commonwealth under the rule of Henry III (1574–1575).
- Personal union with the Kingdom of Navarre (1284–1328 and 1589–1620).
- Partial personal union with Andorra since 1607 (the French head of state is one of two joint heads of state in Andorra).
- Personal union with the Principality of Catalonia (1641-1652).
- Personal union under Napoleon with Italy (1805-1814) and the Confederation of the Rhine (1806-1813).

Note: The point at issue in the War of the Spanish Succession was the fear that the succession to the Spanish throne dictated by Spanish law, which would devolve on Louis, le Grand Dauphin — already heir to the throne of France — would create a personal union that would upset the European balance of power; France had the most powerful military in Europe at the time, and Spain the largest empire.

==== Great Britain ====
Before 1707, see England and Scotland.

- Personal union with Kingdom of Ireland (1707–1801)
- Personal union with Electorate of Hanover (1714–1837)
- Personal union with the Kingdom of Corsica (1794–1796)

After 1801, see United Kingdom below.

==== Hanover ====
- Personal union with Great Britain and Ireland from 1714 to 1801.
- Personal union with the United Kingdom from 1801 to 1807 and again from 1814 to 1837, when differing succession laws resulted in Queen Victoria ascending the British throne and her uncle Ernest Augustus that of Hanover.
- The personal union was interrupted from 1807 to 1813 when Hanover was merged into the Kingdom of Westphalia during the Napoleonic Wars. A few months after the Battle of Leipzig, the Kingdom of Hanover was established, a continuing state.

==== Holy Roman Empire ====
- Personal union with the Kingdom of Sicily from 1194 to 1254 under the Hohenstaufen dynasty.
- Personal union with Spain from 1519 to 1556 under Charles V.
- Personal union with Hungary 1410–1439, 1556–1608, 1612–1740 and 1780–1806.
- Personal union with Kingdom of Naples (1714–1735), Kingdom of Sardinia (1714–1720), Kingdom of Sicily (1720–1735).

==== Hungary ====
- Personal union with Croatia 1102–1918 (see § Croatia above for details).
- Personal union with Poland and Bohemia 1305.
- Personal union with Poland from 1370 to 1382 under the reign of Louis the Great. This period in Polish history is sometimes known as the Andegawen Poland. Louis inherited the Polish throne from his maternal uncle Casimir III. After Louis' death the Polish nobles (the szlachta) decided to end the personal union, since they did not want to be governed from Hungary, and chose Louis' younger daughter Jadwiga as their new ruler, while Hungary was inherited by his elder daughter Mary. Personal union with Poland for the second time from 1440 to 1444.
- Personal union with Naples from 1385 to 1386 under the reign of Charles III of Naples.
- Personal union with Bohemia, 1419–1439 (with both in interregnum during 1437–1438), 1453–1457 and 1490–1918.
- Personal union with the Archduchy of Austria, 1437–1439, 1444–1457, and 1526–1806.
- Personal union with the Holy Roman Empire, 1410–1439, 1556–1608, 1612–1740 and 1780–1806.
- Real union with Austria, 1867–1918 (the dual monarchy of Austria-Hungary) under the reigns of Franz Joseph and Charles IV.

==== Iceland ====
- Personal union with Denmark from 1918 to 1944, when the country became a republic.

==== Ireland ====
- Personal union, as Kingdom of Ireland, with the Kingdom of England (1542–1649 then again following the restoration 1660–1707).
- Personal union, as Kingdom of Ireland, with the Kingdom of Scotland (1603–1649 then again following the restoration 1660–1707).
- Personal union, as Kingdom of Ireland, with the Kingdom of Great Britain (1707–1801).
- Personal union, as Kingdom of Ireland, with the Electorate of Hanover (1714–1801).
- The Irish Free State (1922–1937) and Éire (1937–1949) had the British monarch as head of state (the period 1937–1949 is disputed), but the Crown was considered to be indivisible under the Statute of Westminster. See Personal union#United Kingdom.

==== León, Aragon, and Castile ====
- Kingdom of León, Kingdom of Galicia and Kingdom of Asturias (914–924).
- Kingdom of León and Kingdom of Castile (1037–1065 and 1072–1230).
- Crown of Aragon: personal union of the Kingdom of Aragon, the Principality of Catalonia and the Kingdom of Valencia (1162-1714).
- Crown of Aragon and Kingdom of Navarre (1076–1134).
- Crown of Aragon and Kingdom of Sicily (1412–1516).
- Crown of Aragon and Kingdom of Naples (1442–1458 and 1504–1516).
- Crown of Castile and Duchy of Burgundy (1506).
- Crown of Castile and Crown of Aragon from 1516 to 1715, during Habsburg Spain and until the Nueva Planta decrees (1707–1715) when the crowns of Castile and Aragon were suppressed and the same law was applied, turning Spain into a centralized state.

==== Lithuania ====
- Personal union (the Polish–Lithuanian union) with the Crown of the Kingdom of Poland (1386–1401, 1447–1492 and 1501–1569), then transformed into the Polish–Lithuanian Commonwealth.

==== Luxembourg ====
- Personal union with Bohemia (1313–1378 and 1383–1388).
- Personal union with the Netherlands from 1815 to 1890, when King and Grand Duke William III died leaving only a daughter, Wilhelmina. Since Luxembourg held to Salic Law, Wilhelmina's distant cousin Adolphe succeeded to the Grand Duchy, ending the personal union.

==== Naples ====
- Personal union with Kingdom of Hungary from 1385 to 1386 under the rule of Charles II of Hungary.
- Personal union with Crown of Aragon (1442–1458 and 1504–1516).
- Personal union with Kingdom of France under the rule of Charles VIII (1495) and Louis XII (1501–1504).
- Personal union with the Monarchy of Spain (1516–1714).
- Personal union with Holy Roman Empire (1714–1735).
- Personal union with Kingdom of Sicily from 1735 to 1806 under the rule of the House of Bourbon.

==== Navarre ====
- Personal union with France from 1285 to 1328 due to the marriage between Philip IV of France and Joan I of Navarre and the reign of their three sons, and from 1589 to 1620 due to the accession of Henry IV, after which Navarre was formally integrated into France.

==== Netherlands ====
- Personal union with Principality of Orange (1579–1795).
- Personal union with England, Scotland, and Ireland (1689–1702) during the reign of William III.
- Personal union with Luxembourg (1815-1890).

==== Norway ====
- Harald Bluetooth ruled both Norway and Denmark from 970 to 974.
- Sweyn Forkbeard ruled both Norway and Denmark from 1000 to 1014. He also ruled England from 1013 to 1014.
- Cnut the Great ruled both England and Denmark from 1018 to 1035. He also ruled Norway from 1028 to 1035.
- Personal union with Denmark 1042–1047. Magnus I of Norway, who died of unclear circumstances, ruled both Norway and Denmark.
- Personal union with Sweden (1319-1343/55).
- Personal union with Sweden (1362-1364).
- Personal union with Denmark (1380-1389/97).
- Personal union with Sweden (1449-1450).
- The Kalmar Union with Denmark and Sweden from 1389/97 to 1521/23 (with interruptions).
- Personal union with Denmark (1524-1533).
- Personal union with Denmark (1537-1814), Denmark-Norway.
- Personal union with Sweden from 1814 (when Norway declared independence from Denmark and was forced into a union with Sweden) to 1905.

==== Poland ====
- Personal union with the Duchy of Bohemia (1003–1004).
- Personal union with the Kingdom of Bohemia (1296–1306).
- Personal union with the Kingdom of Hungary (1305, 1370–1382 and 1440–1444) (see Hungary section above).
- Personal union between the Duchy of Płock and Duchy of Wizna in 1345–1351, 1381–1382 and 1435–1495.
- Personal union with the Grand Duchy of Lithuania from 1386 to 1401, 1447 to 1492, and 1501 to 1569.
- Personal union with the Kingdom of France (1574-1575).
- Personal union with the Kingdom of Sweden (1592 to 1599).
- Personal union with the Duchy of Ruthenia (Ukraine) in 1658.
- Personal union with the Electorate of Saxony (1697–1706, 1709–1733 and 1734–1763).
- Personal union with the Russian Empire (1815-1831).

==== Pomerania ====
- Personal union between Pomerania-Stolp and Pomerania-Stargard (1395-1402 and 1403-1478).

==== Portugal ====
- Iberian Union with Spain (1580-1640).
- Personal union with Brazil, under Peter I of Brazil (Peter IV of Portugal), from 10 March 1826 to 28 May 1826. Peter was the Prince Royal of Portugal, Brazil and the Algarves when he declared the independence of Brazil in 1822, becoming its first emperor. When his father (John VI of Portugal) died, Peter became also king of Portugal for only a few weeks, after which he abdicated the Portuguese throne in favor of his older daughter, Princess Maria da Glória.

==== Prussia ====
- Brandenburg-Prussia: personal union between the Margraviate of Brandenburg and Duchy of Prussia (1618–1701).
- Personal union between Kingdom of Prussia and Duchy of Courland and Semigallia (later United Baltic Duchy) (1918).
- Personal union between Kingdom of Prussia and Principality of Neuchâtel, 1707–1806 and 1814–1848. The King of Prussia exchanged territories with France during the 1806–1814 interim.
- Legally mandated Personal union between Kingdom of Prussia and the overall German Empire (1871–1918).

==== Romania ====
- Personal union between Wallachia and Moldavia under the rule of Alexandru Ioan Cuza from 1859 to 1862.

==== Russia ====
- Personal union between the Russian Empire and the Lordship of Jever (1793-1818).
- Personal union between the Russian Empire and the Grand Duchy of Finland (1809-1917).
- Personal union between the Russian Empire and the Congress Poland (1815-1830,1831-1915)

==== Saxe-Coburg and Saxe-Gotha ====
In 1826, the newly created Duchy of Saxe-Coburg and Gotha was initially a double duchy, ruled by Duke Ernest I in a personal union. In 1852, the duchies were bound in a political and real union. They were then a quasi-federal unitary state, even though later attempts to merge the duchies failed.

==== Saxe-Weimar and Saxe-Eisenach ====
The duchies of Saxe-Weimar and Saxe-Eisenach were in personal union from 1741, when the ruling house of Saxe-Eisenach died out, until 1809, when they were merged into the single duchy of Saxe-Weimar-Eisenach.

==== Schleswig and Holstein ====
Duchies with peculiar rules for succession. See the Schleswig-Holstein Question.

The kings of Denmark at the same time being dukes of Schleswig and Holstein 1460–1864. (Holstein being part of the Holy Roman Empire, while Schleswig was a part of Denmark). The situation was complicated by the fact that for some time, the Duchies were divided among collateral branches of the House of Oldenburg (the ruling House in Denmark and Schleswig-Holstein). Besides the "main" Duchy of Schleswig-Holstein-Glückstadt, ruled by the Kings of Denmark, there were states encompassing territory in both Duchies. Notably the Dukes of Schleswig-Holstein-Gottorp and the subordinate Dukes of Schleswig-Holstein-Beck, Schleswig-Holstein-Sonderburg-Augustenburg and Schleswig-Holstein-Sonderburg-Glücksburg.

==== Schwarzburg-Rudolstadt and Schwarzburg-Sondershausen ====
The duchies of Schwarzburg-Rudolstadt and Schwarzburg-Sondershausen were in personal union from 1909, when Prince Günther of Schwarzburg-Rudolstadt succeeded also to the throne of Schwarzburg-Sondershausen, until 1918, when he (and all the other German monarchs) abdicated.

==== Scotland ====
- Personal union, as Kingdom of Scotland, with the Kingdom of England and Kingdom of Ireland (1603–1707) following the accession of James VI, King of Scots, to the joint English and Irish throne. (All monarchs of Scotland were in a personal union with England and Ireland throughout the period 1603–1707, with the exception of Charles II, reigning solely as King of Scots 1649–1651, and the subsequent interregnum between 1651 and restoration of the House of Stuart in 1660)^{1}
- Personal union, as Kingdom of Scotland, with the Principality of Orange and the Dutch Republic (1689–1702) during the reign of William II of Scotland.

^{1}: After 1707, see Great Britain above. After 1801, see United Kingdom below.

==== Sicily ====
- Union (or personal union) with the Holy Roman Empire from 1194 to 1254 under the rule of the House of Hohenstaufen.
- Personal union with the Crown of Aragon from 1282 to 1285 and 1409 to 1516 under the rule of the House of Barcelona and the House of Trastámara.
- Personal union with the Monarchy of Spain from 1516 to 1713 under the rule of the House of Habsburg and the House of Bourbon.
- Personal union with the Duchy of Savoy from 1713 to 1720 under the rule of Victor Amadeus II of Savoy.
- Personal union with the Holy Roman Empire from 1720 to 1734 under the rule of Charles VI of Habsburg.
- Personal union with the Kingdom of Naples from 1735 to 1806 under the rule of the House of Bourbon.

==== Spain ====
- Personal union with Archduchy of Austria and Austrian dynastic lands (1519–1521).
- Personal union with Holy Roman Empire (1519–1556) under Charles I.
- Personal union (Iberian Union) with Kingdom of Portugal (1580–1640).
- Personal union with the Free and Independent State of Cundinamarca (modern-day Colombia) (1810–1813), according to the Constitution of this country, which was not recognized by the Spanish Crown, which still considered these territories to be part of the Viceroyalty of New Granada.

==== Sweden ====
- Personal union with Norway (1319-1343/55).
- Personal union with Norway (1362-1364)
- Personal union with Scania (1332-1360).
- The Kalmar Union with Denmark and Norway from 1389/97 to 1521/23 (sometimes defunct).
- Personal union with Norway (1449-1450).
- Personal union with the Crown of the Kingdom of Poland from (1592-1599).
- Personal union with Norway (1814-1905).

==== United Kingdom ====
- Personal union, with the Principality of Orange and the Dutch Republic (1689–1702) during the reign of William of Orange
- Personal union with the Electorate of Hanover (1801–1806).
- Personal union with the Kingdom of Hanover (1814–1837).

Historically, the Crown of the United Kingdom was considered to be indivisible. However, as the self-governing dominions of the British Commonwealth gained control over the exercise of the royal prerogative in the 1930s, this concept has evolved so that 'the Crown in right of' each realm and territory acts independently of the other realms and territories. The constitutional conventions established in the Statute of Westminster 1931 which required uniformity in the laws of succession, along with a common format for the royal styles and titles, distinguished the Crown of the Commonwealth realms from a personal union, under which there is no alignment between multiple thrones and different laws of succession may exist, but subsequent developments have made the situation more ambiguous.

===== Former dominions and Commonwealth realms =====
- Irish Free State (1922–1937) and Ireland (1937–1949), de jure
- Newfoundland (1907–1934).
- South Africa (1910–1961).
- India (1947–1950).
- Pakistan (1947–1956).
- Ceylon (now Sri Lanka; 1948–1972).
- Ghana (1957–1960).
- Nigeria (1960–1963).
- Sierra Leone (1961–1971).
- Tanganyika (now Tanzania; 1961–1962).
- Trinidad and Tobago (1962–1976).
- Uganda (1962–1963).
- Kenya (1963–1964).
- Malawi (1964–1966).
- Malta (1964–1974).
- The Gambia (1965–1970).
- Rhodesia (now Zimbabwe; 1965–1970), which was not recognized by any other state.
- Guyana (1966–1970).
- Barbados (1966–2021).
- Mauritius (1968–1992).
- Fiji (1970–1987).

===== Current Commonwealth realms =====
- Canada since 1867.
- Australia since 1901.
- New Zealand since 1907.
- Jamaica since 1962.
- The Bahamas since 1973.
- Grenada since 1974.
- Papua New Guinea since 1975.
- Solomon Islands since 1978.
- Tuvalu since 1978.
- Saint Lucia since 1979.
- Saint Vincent and the Grenadines since 1979.
- Belize since 1981.
- Antigua and Barbuda since 1981.
- Saint Kitts and Nevis since 1983.

==== Wales ====
- Personal union, as Principality of Wales, with Kingdom of England (1284–1542).

After 1542, see England above.

=== South America ===
==== Brazil ====
- Personal union with Portugal, under Pedro I of Brazil (Pedro IV of Portugal), from 10 March to 28 May 1826. Pedro was the Prince Royal of Portugal, Brazil and the Algarves when he declared the independence of Brazil in 1822, becoming its first emperor. When his father (John VI of Portugal) died, Pedro also became King of Portugal, but abdicated the Portuguese throne 79 days later in favour of his older child Princess Maria da Glória.

==== Colombia ====
- The Free and Independent State of Cundinamarca (modern-day Colombia) (1810–1813) was in a de iure personal union with Spain, according to the Constitution of Cundinamarca, which was not recognized by the Spanish Crown, which considered these territories to be part of the Viceroyalty of New Granada.

== Republics in personal union ==
Because heads of state and government of republics are ordinarily chosen from within the citizens of the state in question, sovereign republics very rarely share common leaders. A few examples are:

- Uniquely, the President of France is ex officio a constitutional monarch (or, more accurately, diarch) in neighboring Andorra, with the title of Co-Prince. This status was inherited from the role of the French monarchs in Andorra.
- From 1802 to 1804, the First Consul of the French Republic and the President of the Italian Republic was the same person: Napoleon Bonaparte. Bonaparte continued as President of Italy even after he was proclaimed Emperor of the French, until he was proclaimed King of Italy in 1805.
- During the later stages of the Spanish American Wars of Independence, Simón Bolívar was simultaneously President of Gran Colombia (24 February 1819 - 4 May 1830), President of Peru (10 February 1824 – 28 January 1827), and President of Bolivia (12 August 1825 - 29 December 1825). Bolívar had, as President and military Commander-in-Chief of Colombia, led a Colombian army to secure Peruvian independence in 1824-25, and was given the office of President by the Patriot republican governments of both Peru and Bolivia (renamed in his honor from "Upper Peru") as an emergency measure to help secure independence from Spain. After the end of the war, Bolívar relinquished his Peruvian and Bolivian offices and returned to Colombia.
- In 1860 Marthinus Wessel Pretorius was simultaneously elected as the president of Transvaal and Orange Free State. He tried to unify the two countries, but his efforts failed, leading to the Transvaal Civil War.

== See also ==
- Composite monarchy
- Confederation
- Dual mandate
- King-Emperor
- King-Grand Duke
- Political union

== Bibliography ==
- Srodecki, Paul; Kersken, Norbert; Petrauskas, Rimvydas, eds. (2023). Unions and Divisions: New Forms of Rule in Medieval and Renaissance Europe (First ed.). London and New York, NY: Routledge. ISBN 978-1-032-05750-7.
