= Coat of arms of the Duchy of Czersk =

Polish folklore creature

Piast Dragon in the coat of arms of the Duchy of Czersk.

Coat of arms of the Duchy of Czersk is a legendary creature in folklore of Masovia in Poland, that is depicted as a Slavic dragon or wyvern. It was used in the coat of arms of the Masovian Piast dynasty, most notably in the coat of arms of the Duchy of Czersk and the Duchy of Warsaw, where it was depicted respectively as a green and red dragon with red tongue and claws.

== History ==
According to some historians, the dragon was adapted in Polish heraldry from the Matter of Britain. It most likely was introduced as a coat of arms of the Czersk Land thanks to Magnus, son of Harold Godwinson, king of England, that was a komes in Masovia in the 12th century. The oldest known appearance of the Piast Dragon is the seal of duke Trojden I, ruler of the Duchy of Warsaw, that was used after 1311. Later, it was used in the coat of arms of the Duchy of Czersk. According to Jan Długosz, Piast Dragon had appeared on the banner used by duke Janusz I of Warsaw during the Battle of Grunwald in 1410. The dragon has also been present in the coat of arms of the town of Nowy Żmigród. It was introduced in the area in 14th century by Yuri II Boleslav, ruler of the Kingdom of Galicia–Volhynia, who was the son of Trojden I.

Currently, the dragon is present in the coat of arms of several counties of Masovian Voivodeship, Poland, that are: Garwolin (since 2002), Grójec (since 2000), Ostrów (since 2002), Otwock, Pruszków, and Warsaw West. It is also used in the coat of arms of municipilaties of Lesznowola and Nowy Żmigród.

== In folklore ==
According to the local Masovian folklore, the dragon lived in the dungeons located underground between the Czersk Castle and the village of Coniew, and guarded the treasures of duke Konrad I of Masovia.

In the local folklore of Nowy Żmigród, a dragon, a wyvern, or a giant viperinae, lived in the nest on the tree, that was located on the hill near the castle in Stary Żmigród. Nobody was able to drive it away.

== Gallery ==
The coat of arms of the Duchy of Warsaw.

The coat of arms of the Garwolin County.

The coat of arms of the Grójec County.

The coat of arms of the Ostrów County.

The coat of arms of the Otwock County used since 2008.

The coat of arms of the Otwock County used until 2008.

The coat of arms of the Pruszków County.

The coat of arms of the Warsaw West County used from 2012.

The coat of arms of the Warsaw West County used from 2000 to 2012.

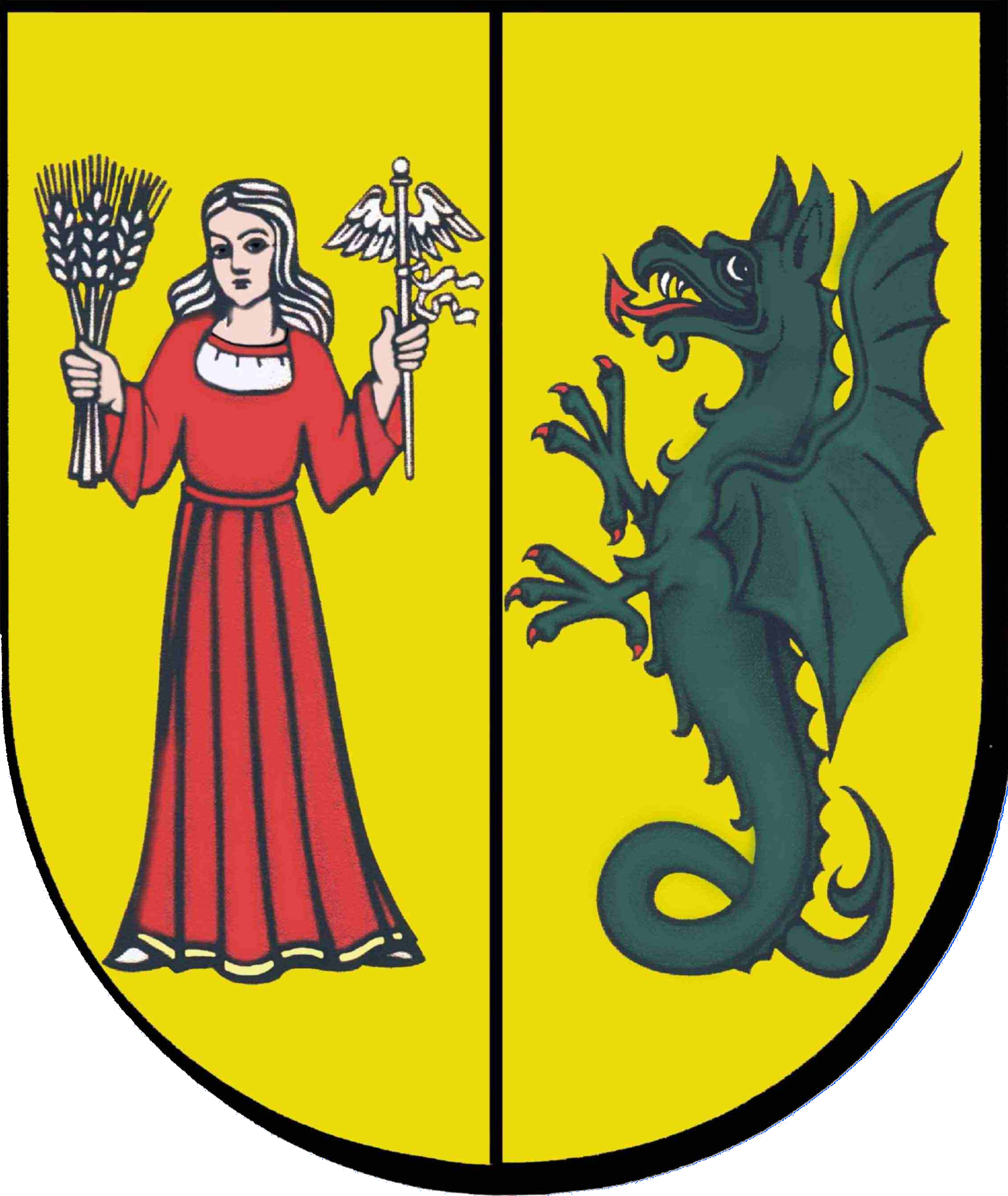
The coat of arms of the municipality of Lesznowola.

The coat of arms of the municipality of Nowy Żmigród.

== See also ==
- Coat of arms of Czersk

== Citations ==
=== Bibliography ===
- Jan Długosz, Roczniki czyli kroniki sławnego Królestwa Polskiego.
- Z. Piech, Ikonografia pieczęci Piastów, Kraków, 1993, p. 95.
- Janusz Grabowski, Bolesław Jerzy II Trojdenowic (1309/1310 – 1340), in: Poczet książąt i księżnych mazowieckich, Kraków 2019, ISBN 978-83-7730-387-0.
