= Duchy of Masovia =

Polish Vassal

Duchy of Masovia Księstwo mazowieckie (Polish) Ducatus Mazouie (Latin)
- 1138–1275; 1294–1310; 1370–1381; 1495–1526
- Banner Coat of arms

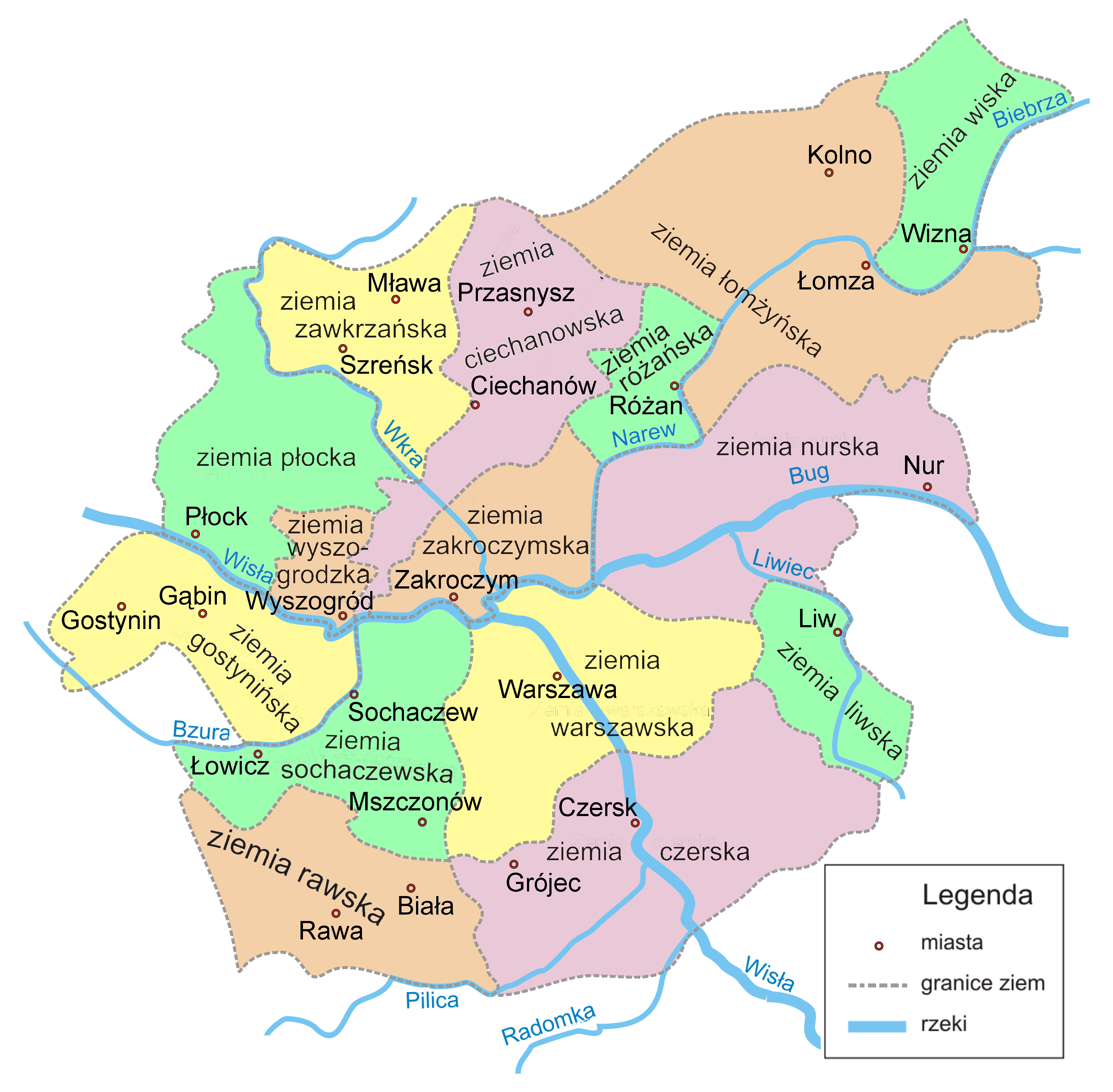
- Masovian lands
- Status: Fiefdom of Kingdom of Poland (1025–1385); Fiefdom of Kingdom of Poland (1385–1569)
- Capital: Płock; Czersk (from 1262); Warsaw (from 1413)
- Religion: Roman Catholic
- Government: District principality
- Dukes
  - 1138–1173: Bolesław the Curly
  - 1194–1247: Konrad I
  - 1248–1262: Siemowit I
  - 1503–1526: Janusz III (last)
- Historical era: Middle Ages
  - Established: 1138
  - Split off Kuyavia: 1233
  - Partitioned: 1313
  - Vassalized by the Polish Crown: 1351
  - Second partition: 1381
  - Incorporated by Poland: 1526
Preceded by
Kingdom of Poland
Duchy of Płock
Duchy of Warsaw
Duchy of Czersk
Duchy of Rawa
Succeeded by
Kingdom of Poland
Duchy of Kuyavia
Duchy of Dobrzyń
Duchy of Płock
Duchy of Warsaw
Duchy of Wizna
Duchy of Czersk
Duchy of Belz
Duchy of Rawa

The Duchy of Masovia (Note: Polish: Księstwo Mazowieckie; Latin: Ducatus Mazouie) was a district principality and a fiefdom of the Kingdom of Poland, existing during the Middle Ages. The state was centered in Mazovia in the northeastern Kingdom of Poland, and during its existence, its capital was located in Płock, Czersk and Warsaw. It was formed in 1138 from the territories of the Kingdom of Poland, following its fragmentation, that was started by the testament of Bolesław III Wrymouth. The country existed in the years: 1138–1275, 1294–1310, 1370–1381, and 1495–1526, between that time, going through fragmentations of its territory into smaller duchies and its unification. The states formed during its fragmentation were duchies of Kuyavia, Dobrzyń, Czersk, Płock, Warsaw, Rawa and Belz. In 1526, the country was incorporated into the Kingdom of Poland.

== History ==
The lands of the Masovians east of the Vistula river had been conquered by the Piast duke Mieszko I of Poland (960–992) and formed a constituent part of his Civitas Schinesghe. The Masovian Diocese of Płock was established in 1075.

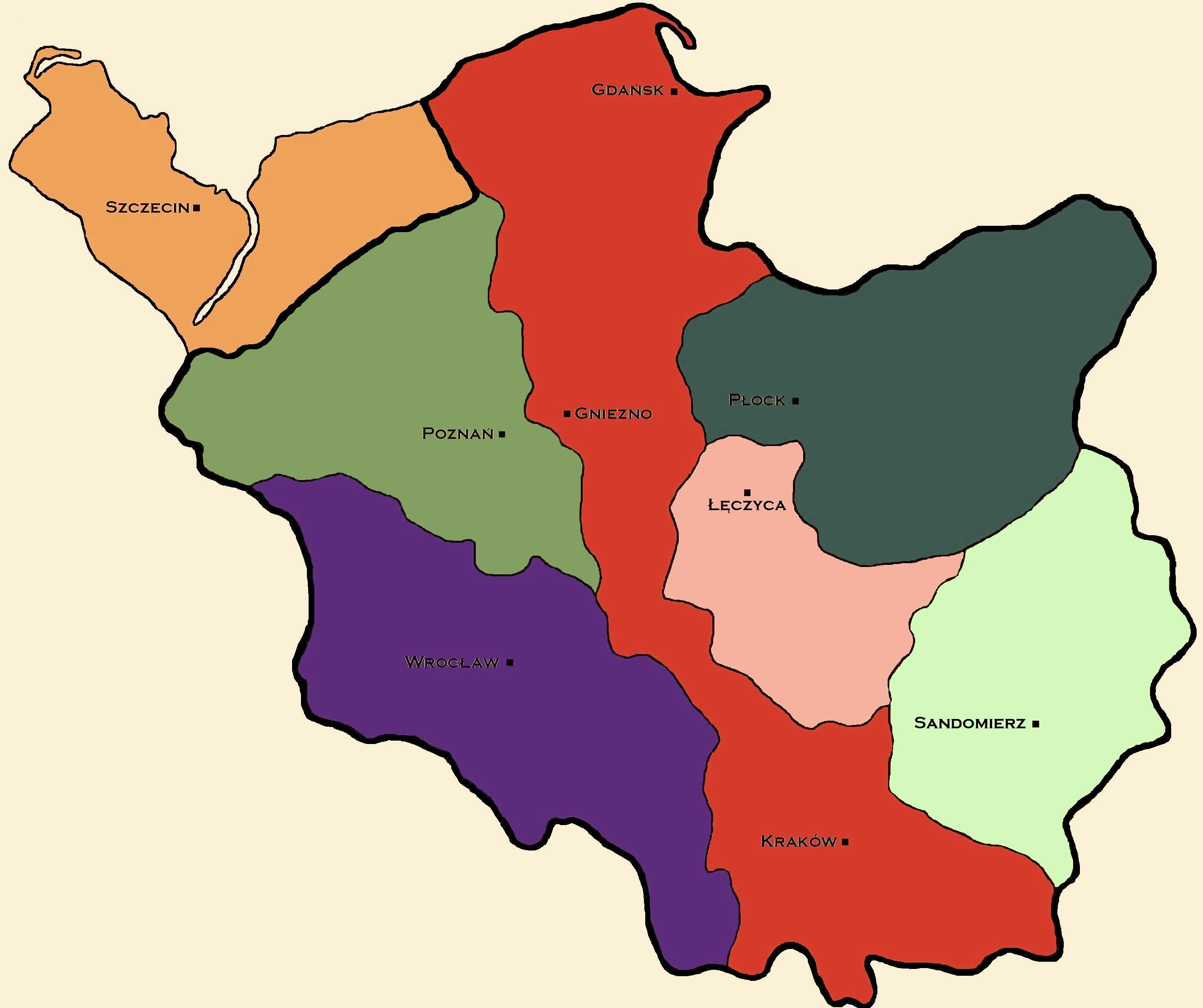
Fragmentation of Poland in 1138: Duchy of Masovia of Bolesław IV composed of Masovia and Eastern Kuyavia

Following the death of Duke Bolesław III Wrymouth in 1138, as specified by his testament, the Masovian province was governed by his second son Bolesław IV the Curly, who, after he had expelled his elder half-brother Władysław II, in 1146 became Duke of Poland. His Masovian realm also comprised the adjacent lands of Kujawy (Kuyavia) on the west bank of the Vistula.

Among the Piast Dukes of Masovia, Bolesław's IV nephew Konrad I was Polish high duke from 1229 to 1232 and again from 1241 to 1243; he was the ruler who in 1226 called the Teutonic Order for help against the pagan Old Prussians threatening the northern borders of his territory. In turn he ceded the Prussian Chełmno Land (Kulmerland) to the knights in 1230; according to the Golden Bull of Rimini (dated 1226), issued by the Hohenstaufen emperor Frederick II, these lands became the nucleus of the Order State. In 1233 Konrad gave Kujawy to his second son Casimir I, while Masovia passed to the first-born Bolesław I upon his death in 1247, succeeded by the youngest brother Siemowit I the next year.

While Siemowit's son Duke Konrad II (1264–1294) moved his residence to Czersk he and his brother Bolesław II entered into a long-term conflict over the Polish seniorate with their Kujawy relatives and the Silesian Piasts, which estranged them from the Piast monarchy. When the kingdom was finally restored in 1295 by the coronation of Duke Przemysł II of Greater Poland, the Duchy of Masovia remained independent.

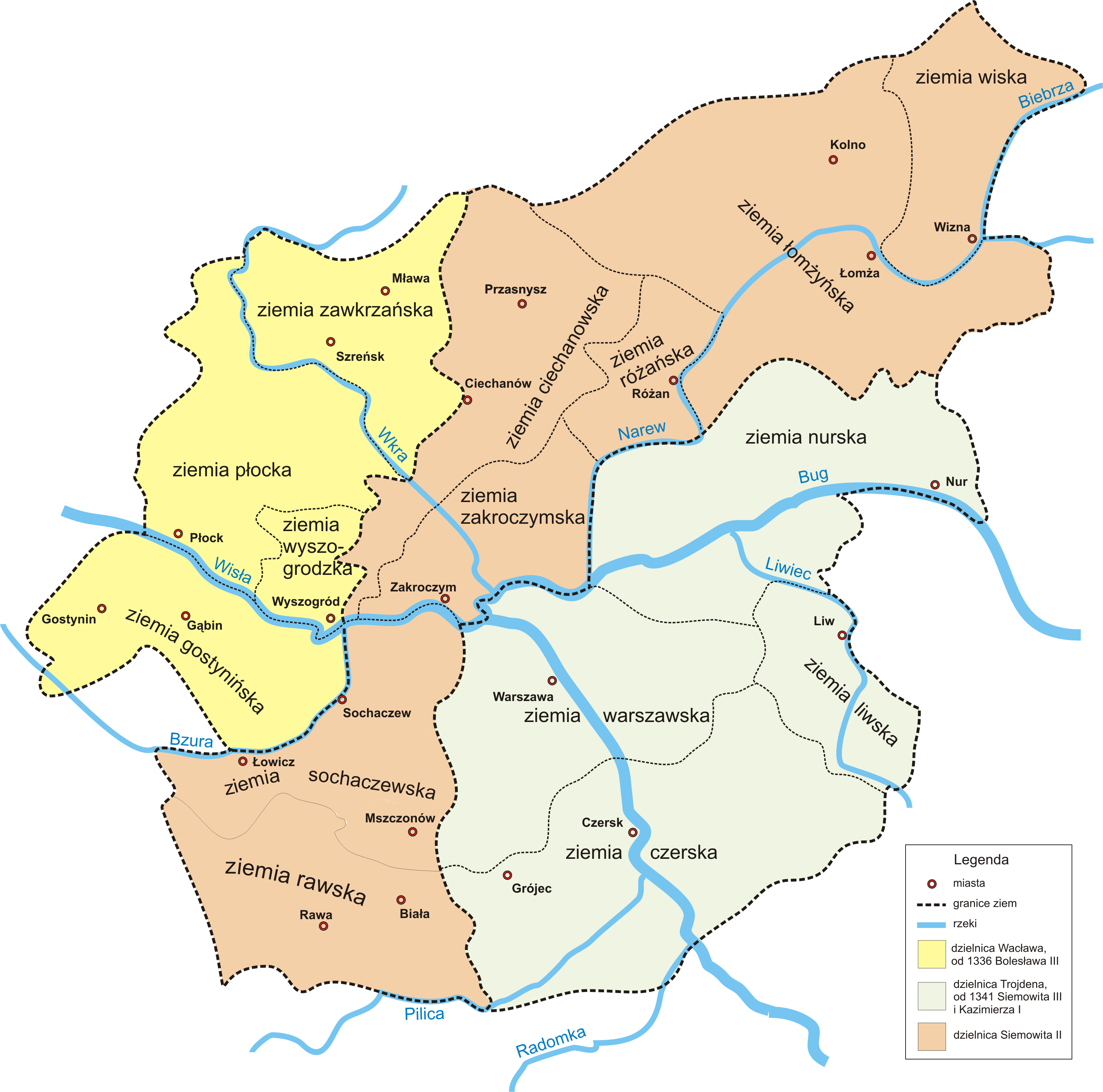
1313 partition: Duchy of Płock under Wenceslaus Duchy of Rawa under Siemowit II Duchy of Czersk under Trojden I

Upon the death of Duke Boleslaus II in 1313, Masovia was divided among his sons:

- Siemowit II became Duke at Rawa (until 1345)
- Trojden I became Duke at Czersk (until 1341)
- Wenceslaus became Duke at Płock (until 1336), followed by his son Bolesław III (until 1351)

As neither Siemowit II nor Bolesław III of Płock left any heirs, Trojden's son Duke Siemowit III (1341–1381) was able to re-unite most of the Masovian lands under his rule; in 1351 he and his brother Casimir became vassals of the Polish kings, while the Bishopric of Płock had always been part of the Polish Archdiocese of Gniezno. Upon Siemowit's III death in 1381 however, Masovia was again partitioned between his sons:

- Janusz I, ruled as duke at Czersk until 1413, when he moved his residence to Warsaw, followed by his grandson Duke Boleslaus IV (1429–1454)
- Siemowit IV, Duke at Rawa and Płock (until 1426), also Duke of Belz from 1388

Since the Polish-Lithuanian Union of 1385, Masovia was localized between the joined Jagiellonian states. The Dukes of Masovia also ruled the Duchy of Belz until 1462.

After the establishment of the Rawa and Płock Voivodeships, in 1495 the last surviving son of Boleslaus IV, Duke Konrad III Rudy, once again united the remaining Masovian lands under his rule. However, the male line of the Masovian Piasts became extinct upon the death of his son Duke Janusz III in 1526, whereafter the duchy as a reverted fief became the Masovian Voivodeship of the Polish Crown.

Parts of the southern region of neighboring East Prussia received settlers and Protestant religious refugees who became known as the Mazurs. By the 18th century the portion of East Prussia in which they settled was sometimes referred to as Masuria (Masuren), and inhabited by a Protestant population of Germans and Poles.

== Partitions of Masovia ==
The Duchy went through various border changes in the coming years, sometimes losing and sometimes gaining territory.

1138–1275	Duchy of Masovia
1275–1294	Duchy of Czersk		Duchy of Płock
1294–1310	Duchy of Masovia
1310–1313	Duchy of Czersk	Duchy of Masovia
1313–1345	Duchy of Warsaw		Duchy of Rawa	Duchy of Płock
1345–1349	Duchy of Warsaw-Rawa			Duchy of Płock
1349–1351	Duchy of Warsaw		Duchy of Rawa	Duchy of Płock
1351–1355	Duchy of Warsaw		Duchy of Rawa	Annexed to Poland
1355–1370	Duchy of Warsaw-Rawa			Annexed to Poland
1370–1381	Duchy of Masovia
1381–1434	Duchy of Warsaw	Duchy of Płock-Rawa
1434–1442/59	Duchy of Warsaw	Duchy of Rawa	Duchy of Płock	Duchy of Bełz
1442/59–1462	Duchy of Warsaw	Duchy of Płock-Rawa
1462–1471	Duchy of Masovia
1471–1488	Duchy of Czersk		Duchy of Warsaw		Duchy of Płock
1488–1495	Duchy of Czersk-Warsaw				Duchy of Płock
1495–1526	Duchy of Masovia

== See also ==
- Duke of Masovia
