= Duchy of Czersk =

Former monarchy in Europe

Duchy of Czersk Księstwo czerskie (Polish) Ducatus Cirnensis (Latin)
- 1275–1294; 1310–1370; 1471–1495
- Coat of arms

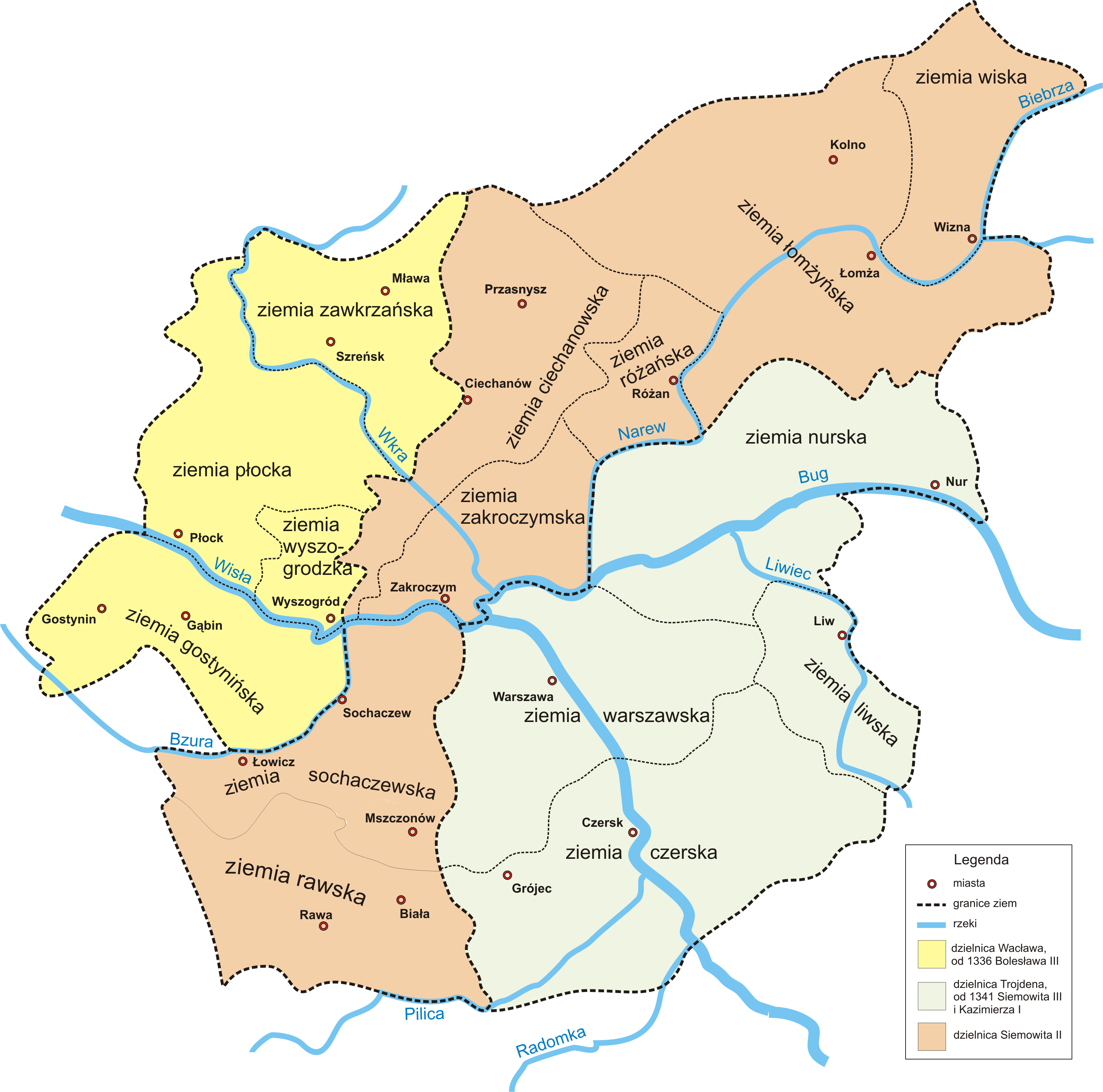
- The map of the political division of Masovia between 1313 and 1345, including the Duchy of Czersk.
- Status: Independent state (1275–1294); Fiefdom within the Kingdom of Poland (1310–1320); Fiefdom of the United Kingdom of Poland (1320–1370); Fiefdom of the Crown of the Kingdom of Poland (1471–1495)
- Capital: Czersk
- Official languages: Polish, Latin
- Religion: Roman Catholic
- Government: Feudal duchy
- Duke
  - 1275–1294 (first state): Konrad II of Masovia
  - 1310–1341 (first of the second state): Trojden I
  - 1355–1370 (last of the second state): Siemowit III
  - 1471–1495 (third state): Konrad III Rudy
- Historical era: High Middle Ages
  - Partition of the Duchy of Masovia: 1275
  - Unification of the Duchy of Masovia: 24 June 1294
  - Partition of the Duchy of Masovia: 1310
  - Unification of the Duchy of Masovia: 5 November 1370
  - Partition of the duchies of Płock and Warsaw: 1471
  - Reformation into the Duchy of Masovia: 1495
Preceded by
Duchy of Masovia
Duchy of Płock
Duchy of Warsaw
Succeeded by
Duchy of Masovia

The Duchy of Czersk (Note: Polish: Księstwo czerskie; Latin: Ducatus Cirnensis) was a feudal district duchy in Masovia, centered on the Czersk Land. Its capital was Czersk.

The country was established in 1275, in the partition of the Duchy of Masovia, with duke Konrad II becoming its ruler. After his death, the duchy was unified with the Duchy of Płock, forming the Duchy of Masovia, on 24 June 1294. The state was again reestablished in 1310, with Trojden I, as its first ruler. It existed until 5 November 1370, when, under the rule of duke Siemowit III, duchies of Czersk, Rawa, and Warsaw were unified into the Duchy of Masovia. It was once again reestablished in 1471, from the part of the territories of the duchies of Płock and Warsaw. In 1488, it incorporated the Duchy of Warsaw, into its territory. It existed until 1495, when, with the incorporation of the Duchy of Płock into the Kingdom of Poland, it remained the only state in Masovia, and subsequently, got reformed into the Duchy of Masovia.

Between 1275 and 1294, it was an independent state, while from 1310 to 1320, it was a fiefdom within the Kingdom of Poland, and from 1320 to 1370 a fiefdom of the United Kingdom of Poland, and from 1471 to 1495, a fiefdom of the Crown of the Kingdom of Poland.

== List of rulers ==
=== First state ===
- Konrad II of Masovia (1275–1294)

=== Second state ===
- Trojden I (1310–1341)
- Siemowit III and Casimir I of Warsaw (1341–1349)
- Casimir I of Warsaw (1349–1355)
- Siemowit III (1355–1370)

=== Third state ===
- Konrad III Rudy (1471–1495)

== Citations ==
=== Bibliography ===
- Agnieszka Teterycz-Puzio, Piastowskie księżne regentki O utrzymanie władzy dla synów (koniec XII w. - początek XIV w.).
- Agnieszka Teterycz-Puzio, Bolesław II Mazowiecki.
- Janusz Grabowski, Dynastia Piastów Mazowieckich.
- Anna Suprunik, Mazowsze Siemowitó.
- Adam Bujak, Nekropolie królów i książąt polskich. Warsaw. Wydawnictwo Sport i Turystyka. 1988. ISBN 83-217-2720-4.
