= Duchy of Płock =

Duchy in Mazovia

Duchy of Płock Księstwo płockie (Polish) Ducatus Plocensis (Latin)
- 1233–1351; 1370–1495
- Coat of arms

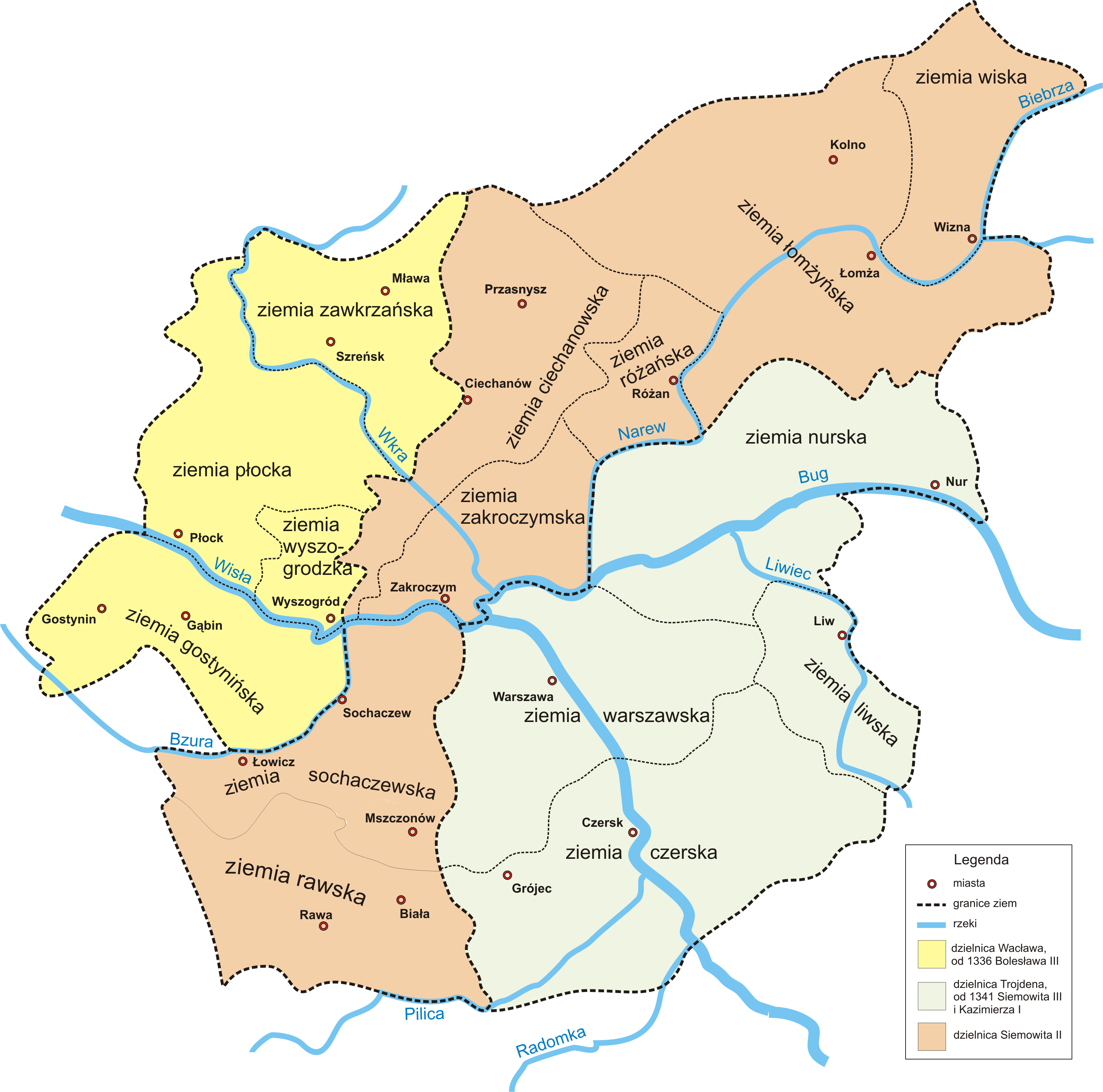
- The map of the political division of Masovia between 1313 and 1345, including the Duchy of Płock.

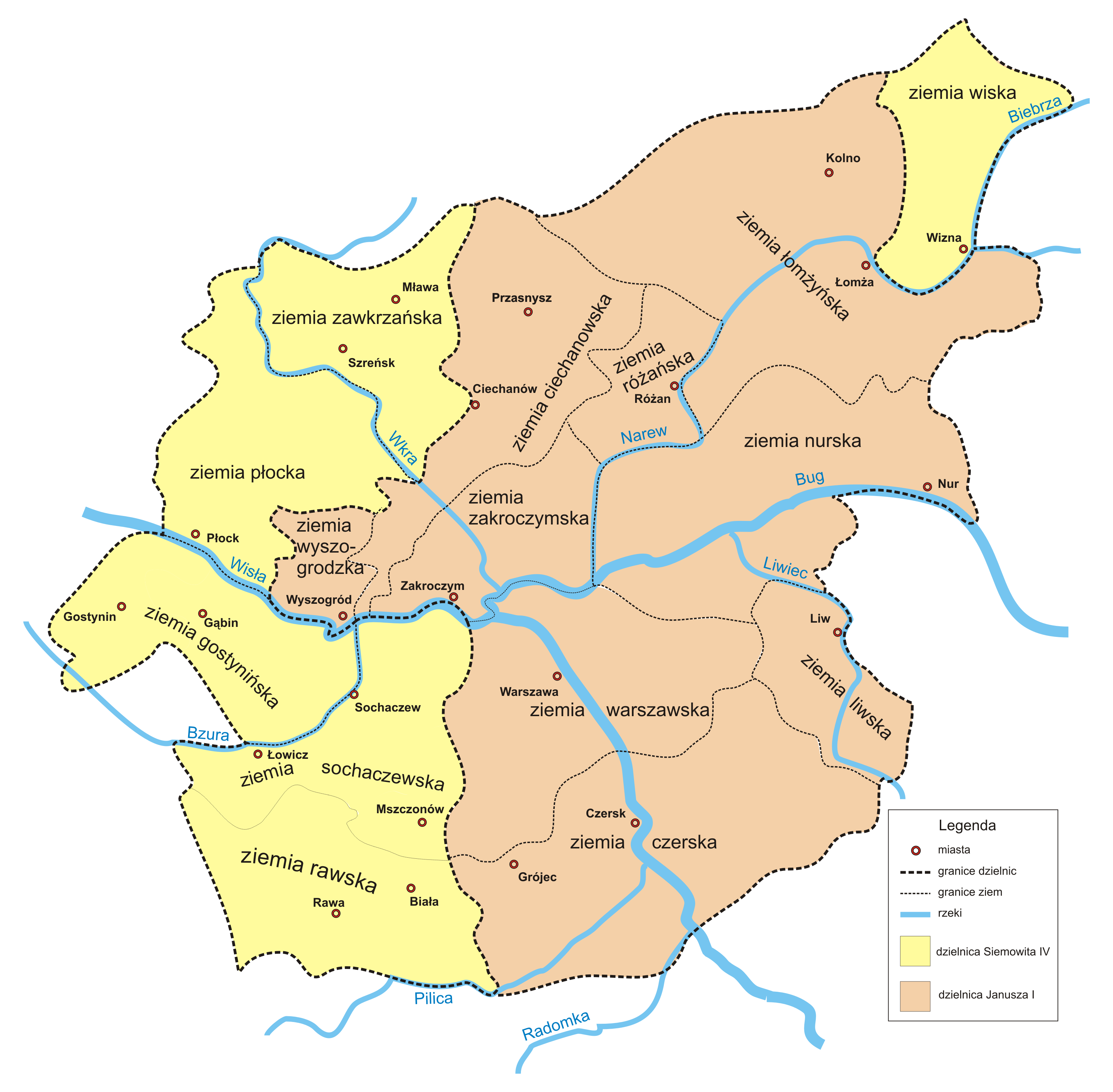
- Masovia in 1381
- Status: Independent state (1275–1294); Fiefdom within the Kingdom of Poland (1310–1320); Fiefdom of the United Kingdom of Poland (1320–1370); Fiefdom of the Crown of the Kingdom of Poland (1471–1495)
- Capital: Płock
- Official languages: Polish; Latin
- Religion: Roman Catholic
- Government: Feudal duchy
- Duke
- Historical era: High Middle Ages
  - Partition of the Duchy of Masovia: 1275
  - Unification of the Duchy of Masovia: 24 June 1294
  - Partition of the Duchy of Masovia: 1310
  - Partition between the Kingdom of Poland, the Duchy of Czersk, and the Duchy of Warsaw: 1351
  - Partition of the Duchy of Masovia: 1381
  - Partition between the Kingdom of Poland and the Duchy of Warsaw: 1462
Preceded by
Duchy of Masovia
Duchy of Rawa
Duchy of Belz
Succeeded by
Duchy of Masovia
Duchy of Warsaw
Duchy of Rawa
Duchy of Czersk
Duchy of Belz

The Duchy of Płock (Note: Polish: Księstwo płockie; Latin: Ducatus Plocensis) was a feudal district duchy in Masovia, centered on the Płock Land. Its capital was Płock. It existed in the High Middle Ages era, from 1275 to 1294, from 1310 to 1351, and from 1381 to 1462.

== History ==
The country was established in 1275, in the partition of the Duchy of Masovia, with duke Bolesław II of Masovia becoming its ruler. After his death, the duchy was unified with the Duchy of Czersk, forming the Duchy of Masovia, on 24 June 1294. The state was again reestablished in 1310, in the partition of Duchy of Masovia. In 1351, it was partitioned between the Kingdom of Poland, Duchy of Czersk, and Duchy of Warsaw. It was again reestablished in June 1381, in the partition of the Duchy of Masovia, with duke Siemowit IV as its first leader. It existed until 1462, when it got partitioned between the Kingdom of Poland, and the Duchy of Warsaw.

== Citations ==
=== Bibliography ===
- Agnieszka Teterycz-Puzio, Bolesław II Mazowiecki
- Janusz Grabowski, Dynastia Piastów Mazowieckich
- Anna Suprunik, Mazowsze Siemowitów
- J. Krzyżaniakowa, J. Ochmański, Władysław II Jagiełło
- O. Balzer, Genealogia Piastów, Kraków. 1895.
- Jerzy Wyrozumski, Dzieje Polski piastowskiej (VIII w.-1370). Kraków, „Fogra”. 1999. ISBN 83-85719-38-5, OCLC 749221743.
