= Duchy of Dobrzyń =

Historical Polish duchy

Duchy of Dobrzyń Księstwo dobrzyńskie (pl)
- 1227–1392
- Coat of arms
- Capital: Dobrzyń nad Wisłą
- Religion: Roman Catholic
- Government: Duchy
- Historical era: High Middle Ages
  - Established: 1227
  - Disestablished: 1392
- Today part of: Poland

The Duchy of Dobrzyń (Polish:Księstwo dobrzyńskie) was a historical state in Dobrzyń Land. The duchy came to existence when Konrad I of Masovia granted the town of Dobrzyń to his eldest offspring.

== History ==
In his Prussian Crusade, Duke Konrad I of Masovia, in 1228, established the Order of Dobrzyń, whom he vested with the Dobrzyń estates. In May 1392, Vladislaus II of Opole pledged the entire Dobrzyń Land to the Teutonic Knights for 50,000 Hungarian florins.
