= Duchy of Rawa =

Feudal Duchy of Poland

Duchy of Rawa Księstwo rawskie (Polish) Ducatus Ravensis (Latin)
- 1313–1370; 1381–1442
- Flag Coat of arms

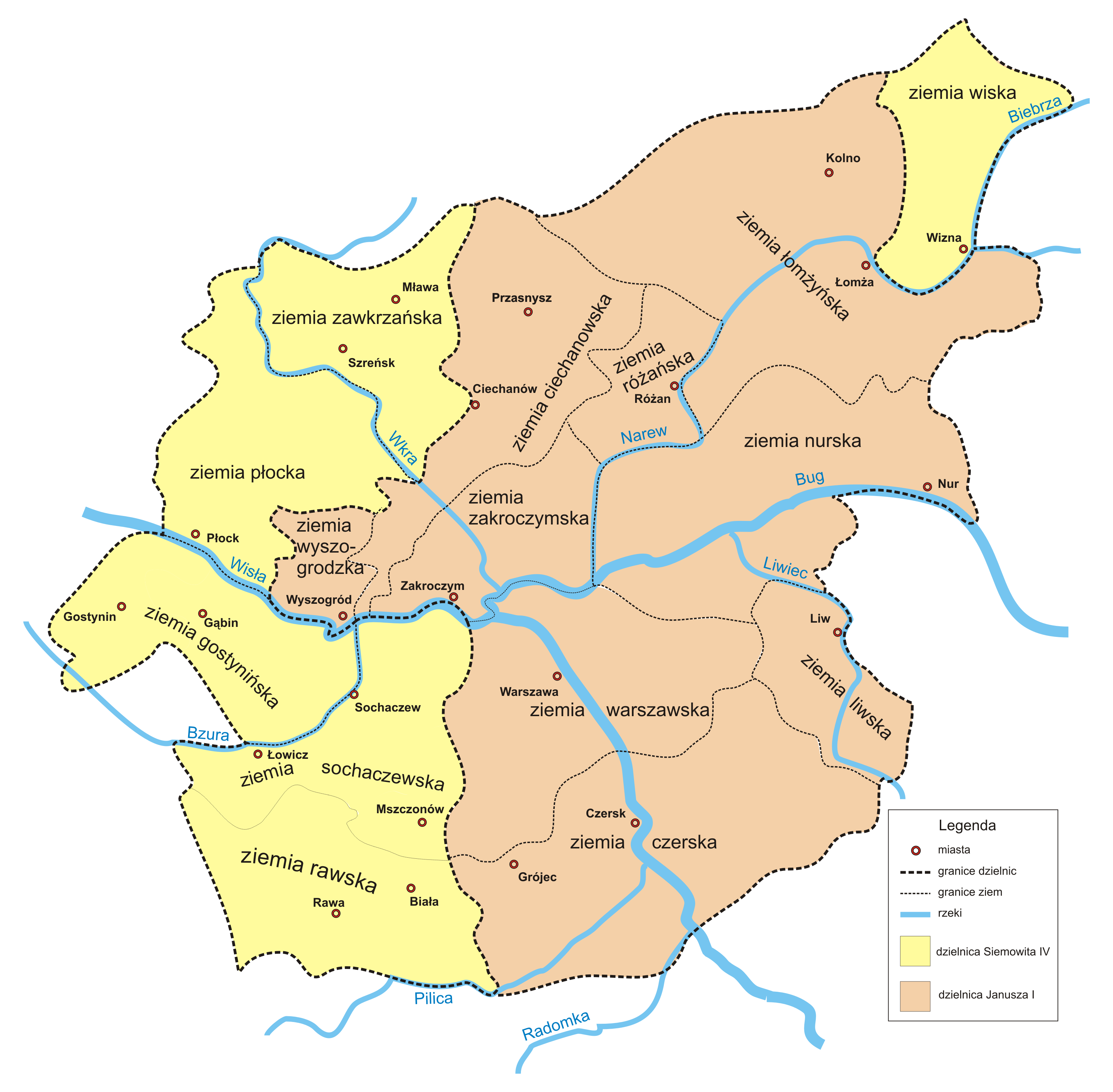
- The map of the political division of Masovia between 1381 and 1426, including the Duchy of Rawa.
- Status: Fiefdom within the Kingdom of Poland (1310–1320); Fiefdom of the United Kingdom of Poland (1320–1385); Fiefdom of the Crown of the Kingdom of Poland (1386–1442)
- Capital: Rawa
- Official languages: Polish, Latin
- Religion: Roman Catholic
- Government: Feudal duchy
- Duke
  - 1313–1345 (first of the first state): Siemowit II of Masovia
  - 1341–1370 (last of the second state): Siemowit III
  - 1381–1426 (first of the second state): Siemowit IV
  - 1426–1442 (last of the second state): Siemowit V of Masovia
- Historical era: High Middle Ages
  - Partition of the Duchy of Płock: 1313
  - Unification of the Duchy of Masovia: 5 November 1370
  - Partition of the Duchy of Masovia: June 1381
  - Incorporation into the Duchy of Płock: 1442
| Preceded by | Succeeded by |
| Duchy of Płock; Duchy of Masovia | Duchy of Masovia; Duchy of Płock |

The Duchy of Rawa (Note: Polish: Księstwo rawskie; Latin: Ducatus Ravensis) was a feudal district duchy in Masovia, centered on the Rawa Land. Its capital was Rawa. It existed during the High Middle Ages era, from 1313 to 1370, and from 1381 to 1442.

The state was established in April 1313, in the partition of the Duchy of Płock, with duke Siemowit II of Masovia becoming its first leader. It existed until 5 November 1370, when, under the rule of duke Siemowit III, duchies of Czersk, Rawa, and Warsaw were unified into the Duchy of Masovia. It was again reestablished in June 1381, in the partition of the Duchy of Masovia, with duke Siemowit IV as its first leader. It existed until 1488, when it got incorporated into the Duchy of Czersk.

From 1310 to 1320, it was a fiefdom within the Kingdom of Poland, and from 1320 to 1385, a fiefdom of the United Kingdom of Poland, and from 1386 to 1442, a fiefdom of the Crown of the Kingdom of Poland.

== List of rulers ==
=== First state ===
- Siemowit II of Masovia (1313-1345)
- Siemowit III and Casimir I of Warsaw (1341–1349)
- Siemowit III (1349–1370)

=== Second state ===
- Siemowit IV (1381–1426)
- Trojden II of Płock, Casimir II of Belz, Władysław I of Płock, and Siemowit V of Masovia (1426–1427)
- Casimir II of Belz, Władysław I of Płock, and Siemowit V of Masovia (1427–1434)
- Siemowit V of Masovia (1434–1442)

== Citations ==
=== Bibliography ===
- Janusz Grabowski, Dynastia Piastów Mazowieckich.
- Anna Suprunik, Mazowsze Siemowitów.
- J. Krzyżaniakowa, J. Ochmański, Władysław II Jagiełło.
- O. Balzer, Genealogia Piastów. Kraków. 1895.
