= Duchy of Warsaw (Middle Ages) =

Former duchy in Poland

Duchy of Warsaw Księstwo warszawskie (Polish) Ducatus Varsoviensis (Latin)
- 1310–1370; 1381–1488
- Banner Coat of arms

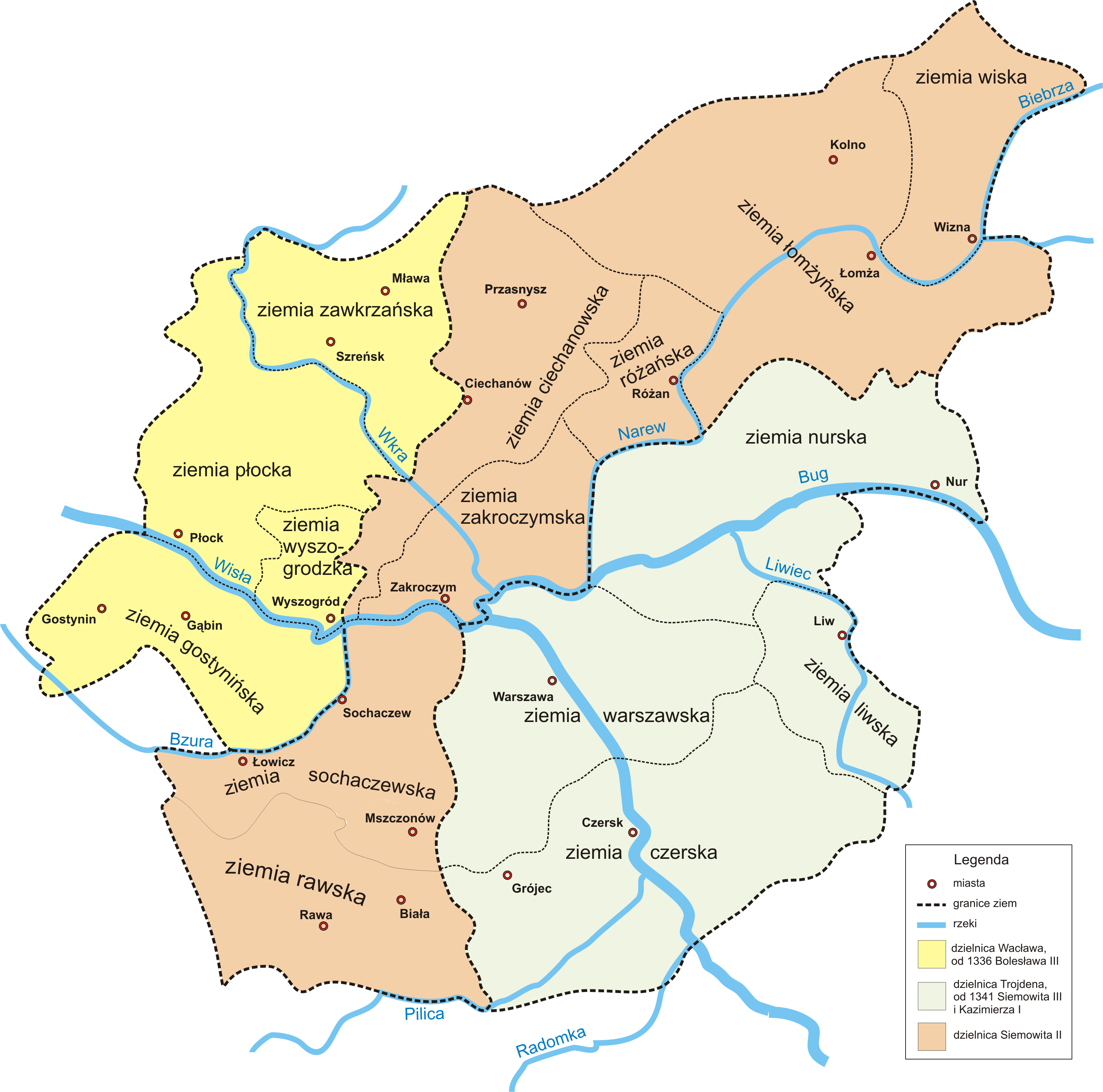
- The map of the political division of Masovia between 1313 and 1345, including the Duchy of Warsaw.
- Status: Fiefdom within the Kingdom of Poland (1310–1320); Fiefdom of the United Kingdom of Poland (1320–1385); Fiefdom of the Crown of the Kingdom of Poland (1386–1488)
- Capital: Warsaw
- Official languages: Polish, Latin
- Religion: Roman Catholic
- Government: Feudal duchy
- Duke
  - 1310–1313 (first of the first state): Siemowit II of Masovia
  - 1355–1370 (last of the first state): Siemowit III
  - 1381–1429 (first of the second state): Janusz I of Warsaw
  - 1471–1481 (last of the last state): Bolesław V of Warsaw
- Historical era: High Middle Ages
  - Partition of the Duchy of Masovia: 1310
  - Unification of the Duchy of Masovia: 5 November 1370
  - Partition of the Duchy of Masovia: June 1381
  - Incorporation into the Duchy of Czersk: 1488
Preceded by	Succeeded by
Duchy of Masovia	Duchy of Masovia; Duchy of Czersk

The Duchy of Warsaw (Note: Polish: Księstwo warszawskie; Latin: Ducatus Varsoviensis) was a feudal district duchy in Masovia, centered on the Warsaw Land. Its capital was Warsaw.

The state was established in 1310, in the partition of the Duchy of Masovia, with duke Siemowit II of Masovia becoming its first leader. It existed until 5 November 1370, when, under the rule of duke Siemowit III, duchies of Czersk, Rawa, and Warsaw were unified into the Duchy of Masovia. It was again re-established in June 1381, in the partition of the Duchy of Masovia, with duke Janusz I of Warsaw as its first leader. It existed until 1488, when it got incorporated into the Duchy of Czersk.

From 1310 to 1320, it was a fiefdom within the Kingdom of Poland, and from 1320 to 1385, a fiefdom of the United Kingdom of Poland, and from 1386 to 1488, a fiefdom of the Crown of the Kingdom of Poland.

== List of rulers ==
=== First state ===
- Siemowit II of Masovia (1310–1313)
- Trojden I (1313–1341)
- Siemowit III and Casimir I of Warsaw (1341–1349)
- Casimir I of Warsaw (1349–1355)
- Siemowit III (1355–1370)

=== Second state ===
- Janusz I of Warsaw (1381–1429)
- Bolesław IV of Warsaw (1429–1454) (Anna Fiodorówna as the regent from 1429 to 1436)
- Casimir III of Płock, Konrad III Rudy, and Bolesław V of Warsaw (1454) (Barbara Aleksandrówna and Paweł Giżycki as regents)
- Casimir III of Płock, Konrad III Rudy, Bolesław V of Warsaw and Janusz II of Płock (1455–1471) (Barbara Aleksandrówna and Paweł Giżycki as regents from 1455 to 1462)
- Bolesław V of Warsaw (1471–1481)

== Citations ==
=== Bibliography ===
- Janusz Grabowski, Dynastia Piastów Mazowieckich.
- Anna Suprunik, Mazowsze Siemowitów.
- J. Krzyżaniakowa, J. Ochmański, Władysław II Jagiełło
