= Duke of Masovia =

Aristocratic title in Poland

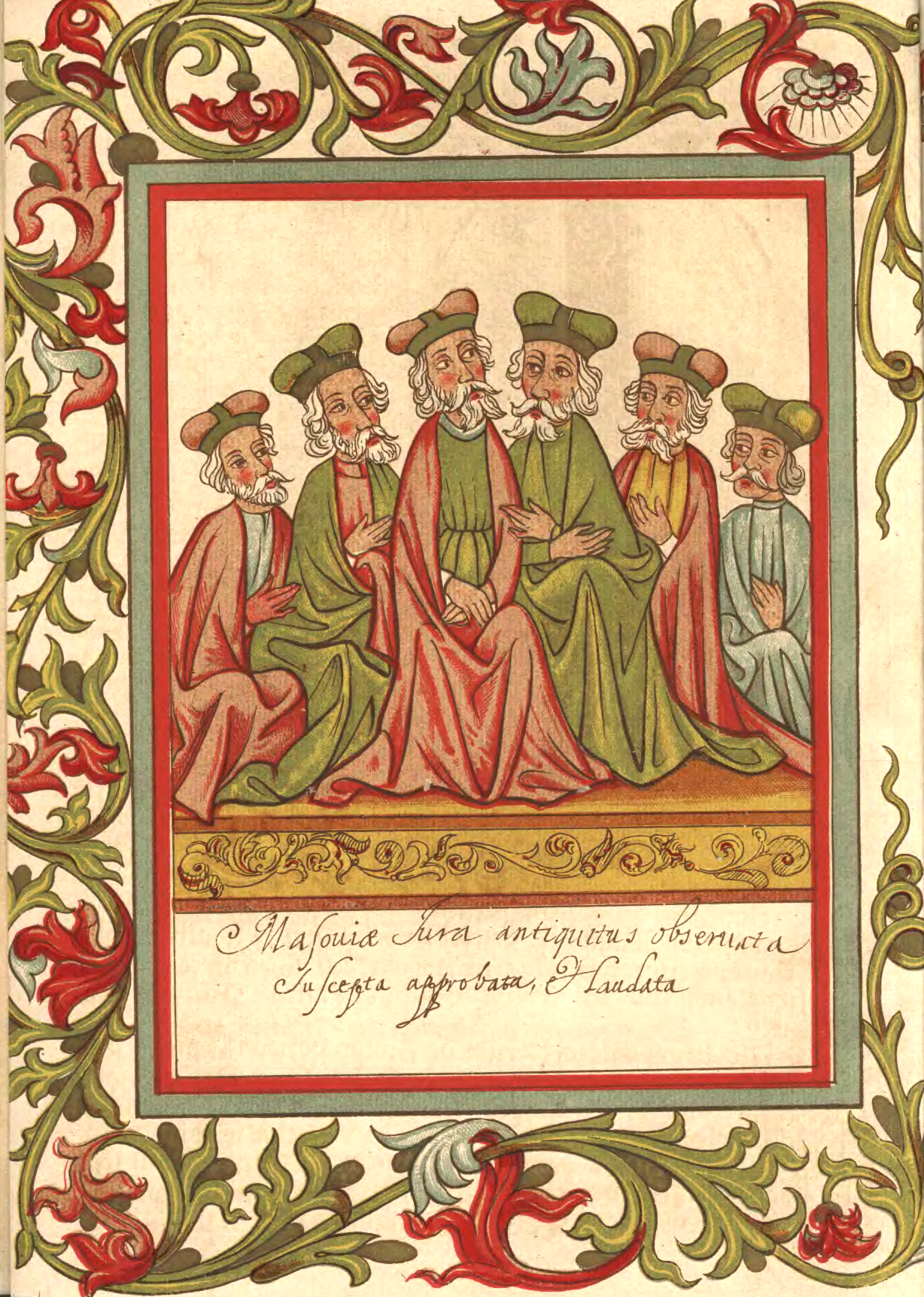
Dukes of Masovia in 1450

Duke of Masovia (Polish: Książę Mazowsza) was a title borne by the sons and descendants of the Polish Duke Bolesław III Wrymouth. In accordance with the last will and testament of Bolesław, upon his death his lands were divided into four to five hereditary provinces distributed among his sons, and a royal province of Kraków reserved for the eldest, who was to be High Duke of all Poland. This was known as the fragmentation of Poland. Subsequent developments lead to further splintering of the duchies.

The following is a list of all rulers of the Duchy of Masovia and its parts. Although not all incumbents listed here had titular rights to the title of Duke of Masovia, they are all listed as such for simplicity's sake.

Also take note that some of the dates are merely approximate and the ownership of certain lands might be disputed. Finally, this table does not include lands ruled by dukes of other parts of partitioned Poland or Wenceslaus II and Wenceslaus III.

== Dukes of Masovia and Kuyavia ==
=== Piast dynasty ===
==== Partitions of Masovia and Kuyavia under Piast dynasty ====
The Duchy went through various border changes in the coming years, sometimes losing and sometimes gaining territory.

Duchy of Masovia (1st creation) (1138-1275)
Duchy of Łęczyca (1267-1351)	Duchy of Dobrzyń (1267-1327)	Duchy of Kuyavia (1247-1333)
Duchy of Czersk (1st creation) (1275-1294)	Duchy of Płock (1st creation) (1275-1294)
Duchy of Gniewkow (1287-1364)	Duchy of Inowrocław (1267-1333)
Duchy of Warsaw (1st creation) (1313-1495)	Duchy of Rawa (1st creation) (1313-1355)	Annexed to Poland	Annexed to Poland
Annexed to Poland (1355-1370)
Annexed to Poland
Duchy of Rawa (2nd creation) (1426-1459)	Duchy of Płock (2nd creation) (1381-1462)
Duchy of Czersk (2nd creation) (1471-1495)	Duchy of Płock (3rd creation) (1471-1495)
Duchy of Masovia (Czersk line; 2nd creation) (1495-1526)

==== Table of rulers ====
Ruler	Born	Reign	Ruling Part	Consort	Death	Notes
Salomea of Berg	1093; Ehingen; Daughter of Henry, Count of Berg and Adelaide of Mochental	28 October 1138 – 27 July 1144	Duchy of Masovia (at Łęczyca)	Boleslaus III of Poland; March–July 1115 eleven children	27 July 1144; Łęczyca aged 50–51	Heirs of Boleslaus III of Poland, Salomea received a widower seat located in Masovia, while her son inherited the main duchy.
Boleslaus (IV) the Curly	1122; Third son of Boleslaus III of Poland and Salomea of Berg	28 October 1138 – 5 January 1173	Duchy of Masovia	Viacheslava Vsevolodovna of Novgorod; 1137 three children Maria c.1170 no children	5 January 1173 aged 50–51	Heirs of Boleslaus III of Poland, Salomea received a widower seat located in Masovia, while her son inherited the main duchy.
Regency of Casimir II of Poland (1173-1176)						Died with no heirs. The duchy passed to his uncle and prior regent.
Leszek I	1162; Son of Boleslaus IV of Poland and Viacheslava Vsevolodovna of Novgorod	5 January 1173 – 1186	Duchy of Masovia	Unmarried	1186 aged 23-24	Died with no heirs. The duchy passed to his uncle and prior regent.
Casimir (II) the Just	28 October 1138; Sixth son of Boleslaus III of Poland and Salomea of Berg	1186 – 5 May 1194	Duchy of Masovia	Helen of Znojmo; 1163 seven children	5 May 1194; Kraków aged 55	Regent of the previous. Also monarch of Poland.
Regency of Helen of Znojmo (1194-1200)						Children of Casimir II of Poland, inherited Masovia jointly, at least until 1200, when Leszek abdicated to pursue a more relevant political career at Kraków. Both were, in fact, and at different moments, monarchs of Poland.
Leszek II the White	1184; First son of Casimir II of Poland and Helen of Znojmo	5 May 1194 – 1200	Duchy of Masovia	Grimislava Ingvarevna of Lutsk between 1208 and 1211 three children	24 November 1227; Gąsawa aged 42–43	Children of Casimir II of Poland, inherited Masovia jointly, at least until 1200, when Leszek abdicated to pursue a more relevant political career at Kraków. Both were, in fact, and at different moments, monarchs of Poland.
Conrad I	1187; Second son of Casimir II of Poland and Helen of Znojmo	5 May 1194 – 31 August 1247	Duchy of Masovia	Agafia of Rus between 1207 and 1210 ten children	31 August 1247 aged 59-60	Children of Casimir II of Poland, inherited Masovia jointly, at least until 1200, when Leszek abdicated to pursue a more relevant political career at Kraków. Both were, in fact, and at different moments, monarchs of Poland.
Boleslaus I	1208; First son of Conrad I and Agafia of Rus	31 August 1247 – 25 February 1248	Duchy of Masovia	Gertrude of Wrocław; 1232 no children Anastasia Alexandrovna of Belz; 1245/47 no children	25 February 1248 aged 39-40	Children of Conrad I, divided their inheritance. As Boleslaus left no children, his younger brother Siemowit inherited his lands, reunifying two thirds of the main duchy. Siemowit was, however, killed in a battle against the Lithuanians, who also took his heir prisoner.
Casimir I	1211; Second son of Conrad I and Agafia of Rus	31 August 1247 – 14 December 1267	Duchy of Kuyavia	Hedwig of Greater Poland (d.c.1235); 1230 no children Constance of Wrocław; 1239; Wrocław two children Euphrosyne of Opole; 1257/59 four children	14 December 1267; Inowrocław aged 55-56	Children of Conrad I, divided their inheritance. As Boleslaus left no children, his younger brother Siemowit inherited his lands, reunifying two thirds of the main duchy. Siemowit was, however, killed in a battle against the Lithuanians, who also took his heir prisoner.
Siemowit I	c.1220? Third son of Conrad I and Agafia of Rus	31 August 1247 – 23 June 1262	Duchy of Masovia (at Czersk until 1248)	Pereyaslava Danilovna of Galicia-Volhynia; 1248 three children	23 June 1262 aged 41-42	Children of Conrad I, divided their inheritance. As Boleslaus left no children, his younger brother Siemowit inherited his lands, reunifying two thirds of the main duchy. Siemowit was, however, killed in a battle against the Lithuanians, who also took his heir prisoner.
Regencies of Pereyaslava Danilovna of Galicia-Volhynia and Boleslaus, Duke of Greater Poland (1262-1264)						Children of Siemowit I, divided their inheritance. Conrad was the heir in captivity by the Lithuanians, but was released two years later. Conrad left no children and his brother inherited his part.
Conrad II	1250; First son of Siemowit I and Pereyaslava Danilovna of Galicia-Volhynia	23 June 1262 –21 December 1294	Duchy of Czersk	Hedwig of Legnica; 1265/70 one child	21 December 1294 aged 43–44	Children of Siemowit I, divided their inheritance. Conrad was the heir in captivity by the Lithuanians, but was released two years later. Conrad left no children and his brother inherited his part.
Boleslaus II	1253; Second son of Siemowit I and Pereyaslava Danilovna of Galicia-Volhynia	23 June 1262 – 20 April 1313	Duchy of Płock	Gaudemantė Sophia of Lithuania; 1279 three children Kunigunde of Bohemia; 1291 (divorced 1302) two children	20 April 1313 aged 59–60	Children of Siemowit I, divided their inheritance. Conrad was the heir in captivity by the Lithuanians, but was released two years later. Conrad left no children and his brother inherited his part.
Leszek I the Black	1241; Brześć Kujawski; First son of Casimir I and Constance of Wrocław	14 December 1267 – 30 September 1288	Duchy of Łęczyca	Agrippine Rostislavna of Halych; 1265 no children	30 September 1288; Kraków aged 46–47	Children of Casimir I, divided and exchanged their inheritances. The younger brothers were minors and remained under regency until 1275. Leaving no descendants, Leszek left Leczyca to his haçf-brother Casimir. Of all these brothers, Leszek and Ladislaus ruled also as dukes of Poland in different moments, but was this last one that became King of Poland in 1320. The ascension motivated more exchanges between the newly founded kingdom and this branch of the family, and a faster annexation of its domains.
Siemomysł	1245; Second son of Casimir I and Constance of Wrocław	14 December 1267 – 24 December 1287	Duchy of Inowrocław	Salomea of Pomerelia; 1268 six children	24 December 1287 aged 46–47	
Regency of Euphrosyne of Opole (1267-1275)
Ladislaus I the Elbow-high	1260; First son of Casimir I and Euphrosyne of Opole	14 December 1267 – 2 March 1333	Duchy of Brześć Kujawski (Kuyavia proper; within the Kingdom of Poland since 1320)	Hedwig of Kalisz; 6 January 1293 six children	2 March 1333; Kraków aged 46–47	
Casimir II	1261; Second son of Casimir I and Euphrosyne of Opole	14 December 1267 – 10 June 1294	Duchy of Łęczyca (in co-rulership in Brześć Kujawski until 1288)	Unmarried	10 June 1294 aged 46–47	
Siemowit	1262; Third son of Casimir I and Euphrosyne of Opole	14 December 1267 – 1312	Duchy of Dobrzyń	Anastasia Lvovna of Galicia–Volhynia; 1296/1300 three children	1312 aged 49–50	
Leczyca briefly annexed to Brześć Kujawski (1294-1300) and Bohemia (1300-1306), and then joined Dobrzyń
Brześć Kujawski annexed to Poland
Regency of Salomea of Pomerelia (1287-1294)						Children of Siemomysl, divided their inheritance. In 1324, Leszek abdicated unexpectedly of all his inheritance to his brother Premislaus.
Leszek II	1275; First son of Siemomysł and Salomea of Pomerelia	24 December 1287 – 1314	Duchy of Inowrocław (at Inowroclaw proper)	Unmarried	1340 aged 64–65	Children of Siemomysl, divided their inheritance. In 1324, Leszek abdicated unexpectedly of all his inheritance to his brother Premislaus.
Premislaus	1278; Second son of Siemomysł and Salomea of Pomerelia	24 December 1287 – 16 February 1339	Duchy of Inowrocław (in Wyszogród until 1327; in Inowroclaw 1314-27; in Sieradz from 1327)	Unmarried	16 February 1339 aged 46–47	Children of Siemomysl, divided their inheritance. In 1324, Leszek abdicated unexpectedly of all his inheritance to his brother Premislaus.
Casimir III	1280; Third son of Siemomysł and Salomea of Pomerelia	24 December 1287 – 13 May 1350	Duchy of Gniewków	Unknown at least children	13 May 1350 aged 69–70	Children of Siemomysl, divided their inheritance. In 1324, Leszek abdicated unexpectedly of all his inheritance to his brother Premislaus.
Wyszogród, Inowroclaw and Sieradz annexed to Poland
Regency of Ladislaus I, Duke of Kuyavia and Anastasia Lvovna of Galicia–Volhynia (1312-1316)						Children of Siemowit, ruled jointly. As none of them left children, their possessions were inherited by Poland.
Leszek III	c.1300 First son of Siemowit and Anastasia Lvovna of Galicia–Volhynia	1312 – July 1316	Duchy of Dobrzyń (in Dobrzyń nad Wisłą until 1327; at Łęczyca since 1327)	Unmarried	July 1316 aged 15–16	Children of Siemowit, ruled jointly. As none of them left children, their possessions were inherited by Poland.
Ladislaus II the Hunchback	1303; Second son of Siemowit and Anastasia Lvovna of Galicia–Volhynia	1312 – April 1352	Duchy of Dobrzyń (in Dobrzyń nad Wisłą until 1327; at Łęczyca since 1327)	Anna (d. September 1349) no children	April 1352 aged 48–49	Children of Siemowit, ruled jointly. As none of them left children, their possessions were inherited by Poland.
Boleslaus	c.1305 Third son of Siemowit and Anastasia Lvovna of Galicia–Volhynia	1312 – 1328	Duchy of Dobrzyń (in Dobrzyń nad Wisłą until 1327; at Łęczyca since 1327)	Unmarried	1328 aged 22–23	Children of Siemowit, ruled jointly. As none of them left children, their possessions were inherited by Poland.
Dobrzyń and Łęczyca annexed to Poland
Siemowit II	1283; First son of Boleslaus II and Gaudemantė Sophia of Lithuania	20 April 1313 – 18 February 1345	Duchy of Rawa	Unmarried	18 February 1345; Sochaczew aged 61–62	Children of Boleslaus II, divided their inheritance. Siemowit left no descendants and left his county to his nephews. Trojden apparently already retained Czersk during his father's lifetime, but he inherited Warsaw after his death. Trojden also put his own son in the throne of Galicia-Volhynia, in virtue of his marriage.
Trojden I	1284; Second son of Boleslaus II and Gaudemantė Sophia of Lithuania	20 April 1313 – 13 March 1341	Duchy of Warsaw	Maria Yurievna of Galicia-Volhynia; 1309/10 four children	13 March 1341; Warka aged 56–57	Children of Boleslaus II, divided their inheritance. Siemowit left no descendants and left his county to his nephews. Trojden apparently already retained Czersk during his father's lifetime, but he inherited Warsaw after his death. Trojden also put his own son in the throne of Galicia-Volhynia, in virtue of his marriage.
Wenceslaus	1293; Son of Boleslaus II and Kunigunde of Bohemia	20 April 1313 – 23 May 1336	Duchy of Płock	Dannila Elisabeth of Lithuania; 1316 two children	23 May 1336; Płock aged 42–43	Children of Boleslaus II, divided their inheritance. Siemowit left no descendants and left his county to his nephews. Trojden apparently already retained Czersk during his father's lifetime, but he inherited Warsaw after his death. Trojden also put his own son in the throne of Galicia-Volhynia, in virtue of his marriage.
Regencies of Dannila Elisabeth of Lithuania, Siemowit II, Duke of Rawa and Trojden I, Duke of Warsaw (1336-1340)						
Boleslaus III	1322; Son of Wenceslaus and Dannila Elisabeth of Lithuania	23 May 1336 – 20 August 1351	Duchy of Płock	Unmarried	20 August 1351; Mělník aged 28–29	
Płock was temporarily annexed to the Kingdom of Poland (1351-1370), and then to Warsaw
Siemowit III	1314; First son of Trojden I and Maria Yurievna of Galicia-Volhynia	13 March 1341 – 16 June 1381	Duchy of Warsaw	Euphemia of Opava; 1335 five children Anna of Ziębice c.1360 three children	16 June 1381 aged 66–67	Children of Trojden I, first ruled jointly, and, after their uncle Siemowit II's death (1345), divided their inheritance, made official in 1349. Between 1355 and 1370, Warsaw reunited the Masovian territories, but they were again divided after Siemowit III's death.
Casimir I	1329; Second son of Trojden I and Maria Yurievna of Galicia-Volhynia	13 March 1341 – 5 December 1355	Duchy of Rawa (at Warsaw until 1345)	Unmarried	5 December 1355 aged 25–26	Children of Trojden I, first ruled jointly, and, after their uncle Siemowit II's death (1345), divided their inheritance, made official in 1349. Between 1355 and 1370, Warsaw reunited the Masovian territories, but they were again divided after Siemowit III's death.
Rawa annexed to Warsaw
Ladislaus III the White	1327; Son of Casimir III	13 May 1350 – 5 April 1364	Duchy of Gniewków	Elisabeth of Strzelce; 1359 no children	29 February 1388; Strasbourg aged 60–61	In 1364 sold his possessions to Poland, but raised himself as candidate to the Kingdom of Poland after the death of Casimir III the Great. In 1377, resigned all his claims.
Gniewków annexed to Poland
Janusz I the Elder	1347; First son of Siemowit III and Euphemia of Opava	16 June 1381 – 8 December 1429	Duchy of Warsaw	Danutė Anna of Lithuania; 1371/3 four children	8 December 1429; Czersk aged 81–82	Children of Siemowit III, divided their inheritance. Janusz was, after 1391, Duke of Podlasie. Siemowit lost much of his domain to the Teutonic Order in 1382 (Wizna, Zawkrze, Płońsk), but gained Bełz from Poland.
Siemowit IV the Younger	1353; Second son of Siemowit III and Euphemia of Opava	16 June 1381 – 21 January 1426	Duchy of Płock	Alexandra of Lithuania; 1387 thirteen children	21 January 1426; Gostynin aged 72–73	Children of Siemowit III, divided their inheritance. Janusz was, after 1391, Duke of Podlasie. Siemowit lost much of his domain to the Teutonic Order in 1382 (Wizna, Zawkrze, Płońsk), but gained Bełz from Poland.
Siemowit V	1389; First son of Siemowit IV and Alexandra of Lithuania	21 January 1426 – 17 February 1442	Duchy of Rawa	Margareta of Racibórz; 1434/37 one child	17 February 1442; Rawa Mazowiecka aged 52–53	Sons of Siemowit IV, divided their inheritance. The death of Siemowit and Casimir in 1442, both without descendants, allowed Ladislaus to reunite the inheritance of his father (all but Gostynin, town that remained under Siemowit V's widow's control).
Casimir II	1401; Second son of Siemowit IV and Alexandra of Lithuania	21 January 1426 – 15 September 1442	Duchy of Płock (in Bełz)	Margareta of Szamotuł; 26 June 1442; Turobin no children	15 September 1442; Miączyn aged 40–41	Sons of Siemowit IV, divided their inheritance. The death of Siemowit and Casimir in 1442, both without descendants, allowed Ladislaus to reunite the inheritance of his father (all but Gostynin, town that remained under Siemowit V's widow's control).
Trojden II	1403; Third son of Siemowit IV and Alexandra of Lithuania	21 January 1426 – 25 July 1427	Duchy of Płock (in Płock proper)	Unmarried	25 July 1427 aged 23–24	Sons of Siemowit IV, divided their inheritance. The death of Siemowit and Casimir in 1442, both without descendants, allowed Ladislaus to reunite the inheritance of his father (all but Gostynin, town that remained under Siemowit V's widow's control).
Ladislaus I	1406; Fourth son of Siemowit IV and Alexandra of Lithuania	21 January 1426 – 12 December 1455	Duchy of Płock (in Płock proper)	Anna of Oleśnica; 1444 two children	12 December 1455 aged 50–51	Sons of Siemowit IV, divided their inheritance. The death of Siemowit and Casimir in 1442, both without descendants, allowed Ladislaus to reunite the inheritance of his father (all but Gostynin, town that remained under Siemowit V's widow's control).
Rawa (with exceptions) was annexed to Płock
Belz remerged in Płock
Regency of Danutė Anna of Lithuania (1429-1436)						
Boleslaus IV	1421; Son of Janusz I and Danutė Anna of Lithuania	8 December 1429 – 10 September 1454	Duchy of Warsaw	Barbara Olelkovna of Slutsk-Kapy; 1440/5 ten children	10 September 1454; Opinogóra Górna aged 32-33	
Margareta of Racibórz	1410; Daughter of John II, Duke of Racibórz and [[|Helena of Lithuania]]	17 February 1442 – 5 July 1459	Duchy of Rawa (at Gostynin)	Siemowit V 1434/37 one child	5 July 1459; Gostynin (?) aged 48-49	Received Gostynin as her husband's inheritance. After her death her part rejoined Płock.
Gostynin was annexed to Płock
Anna of Oleśnica	c.1425 Daughter of Conrad V, Duke of Oleśnica and Margareta	12 December 1455 – August 1482	Duchy of Płock (in Sochaczew until 1476; in Koło and Mszczonów from 1476)	Ladislaus I 1444 two children	August 1482 aged 56–57	Sons of Ladislaus I, ruled jointly. In 1459 inherited Gostynin from their aunt Margareta. After their deaths, Masovia was again reunited by the sons of Boleslaus IV. Their mother Anna, besides the regency of her sons, had also an independent seat in Sochaczew (1455–76). When this land was annexed to Poland, she received Koło and Mszczonów as compensation (1476–82).
Regencies of Anna of Oleśnica and Paul Giżycki, Bishop of Płock (1455-1459 and 1462)						Sons of Ladislaus I, ruled jointly. In 1459 inherited Gostynin from their aunt Margareta. After their deaths, Masovia was again reunited by the sons of Boleslaus IV. Their mother Anna, besides the regency of her sons, had also an independent seat in Sochaczew (1455–76). When this land was annexed to Poland, she received Koło and Mszczonów as compensation (1476–82).
Siemowit VI	2 January 1446; First son of Ladislaus I and Anna of Oleśnica	12 December 1455 – 1 January 1462	Duchy of Płock (in Płock proper)	Unmarried	1 January 1462 aged 15	Sons of Ladislaus I, ruled jointly. In 1459 inherited Gostynin from their aunt Margareta. After their deaths, Masovia was again reunited by the sons of Boleslaus IV. Their mother Anna, besides the regency of her sons, had also an independent seat in Sochaczew (1455–76). When this land was annexed to Poland, she received Koło and Mszczonów as compensation (1476–82).
Ladislaus II	November 1448; Second son of Ladislaus I and Anna of Oleśnica	12 December 1455 – 27 February 1462	Duchy of Płock (in Płock proper)	Unmarried	27 February 1462 aged 13	Sons of Ladislaus I, ruled jointly. In 1459 inherited Gostynin from their aunt Margareta. After their deaths, Masovia was again reunited by the sons of Boleslaus IV. Their mother Anna, besides the regency of her sons, had also an independent seat in Sochaczew (1455–76). When this land was annexed to Poland, she received Koło and Mszczonów as compensation (1476–82).
Płock, Koło and Mszczonów were annexed to Warsaw; Sochazew was annexed to Poland
Regencies of Barbara Olelkovna of Slutsk-Kapy and Paul Giżycki, Bishop of Płock (1454-1462)						Children of Boleslaus IV, ruled firstly jointly ruled jointly under regency. In 1462 they inherited the rest of Masovia, reuniting the Duchy. In 1471, they divided the inheritance. In 1495, as the last surviving brother in power, Conrad III reunited all Masovia definitely.
Conrad III the Red	1447; Third son of Boleslaus IV and Barbara Olelkovna of Slutsk-Kapy	10 September 1454 – 28 October 1503	Duchy of Masovia (in Czersk until 1495)	Magdalena Stawrot; 1468/70 (morganatic) no children Unknown bef. 20 July 1477 (morganatic, divorced 1493?) no children Anna Radziwiłł; 1496/7 four children	28 October 1503; Osieck aged 55–56	Children of Boleslaus IV, ruled firstly jointly ruled jointly under regency. In 1462 they inherited the rest of Masovia, reuniting the Duchy. In 1471, they divided the inheritance. In 1495, as the last surviving brother in power, Conrad III reunited all Masovia definitely.
Casimir III	10 June 1448; Fifth son of Boleslaus IV and Barbara Olelkovna of Slutsk-Kapy	10 September 1454 – 1475	Duchy of Płock (in Duchy of Warsaw until 1462)	Unmarried	9 June 1480; Pułtusk aged 31	Children of Boleslaus IV, ruled firstly jointly ruled jointly under regency. In 1462 they inherited the rest of Masovia, reuniting the Duchy. In 1471, they divided the inheritance. In 1495, as the last surviving brother in power, Conrad III reunited all Masovia definitely.
Boleslaus V	1453; Seventh son of Boleslaus IV and Barbara Olelkovna of Slutsk-Kapy	10 September 1454 – 27 April 1488	Duchy of Warsaw (at Warsaw proper)	Anna Radzanów; 20 July 1477 (morganatic, annulled 1480) no children	27 April 1488; Łomża aged 34-35	Children of Boleslaus IV, ruled firstly jointly ruled jointly under regency. In 1462 they inherited the rest of Masovia, reuniting the Duchy. In 1471, they divided the inheritance. In 1495, as the last surviving brother in power, Conrad III reunited all Masovia definitely.
Janusz II	1455; Eighth son of Boleslaus IV and Barbara Olelkovna of Slutsk-Kapy	10 September 1454 – 16 February 1495	Duchy of Warsaw (at Ciechanów and Łomża)	Unmarried	16 February 1495; Płock aged 39-40	Children of Boleslaus IV, ruled firstly jointly ruled jointly under regency. In 1462 they inherited the rest of Masovia, reuniting the Duchy. In 1471, they divided the inheritance. In 1495, as the last surviving brother in power, Conrad III reunited all Masovia definitely.
Regency of Anna Radziwiłł (1503-1518)						Sons of Conrad III, ruled jointly.
Stanisław	17 May 1501; First son of Conrad III and Anna Radziwiłł	28 October 1503 – 8 August 1524	Duchy of Masovia	Unmarried	8 August 1524 aged 23	Sons of Conrad III, ruled jointly.
Janusz III	27 September 1502; Second son of Conrad III and Anna Radziwiłł	28 October 1503 – 10 March 1526	Duchy of Masovia	Unmarried	10 March 1526 aged 24	Sons of Conrad III, ruled jointly.
Anna	c.1498 Daughter of Conrad III and Anna Radziwiłł	10 March 1526 – 1537	Duchy of Masovia	Stanisław Odrowąż; 1536 one child	January 1557; Jarosław aged 58–59	The last Masovian Piast. Anna was elected duchess by the nobles to maintain the independence of the Duchy. She forfeited her rights to Poland in 1537.

== See also ==
- Piast dynasty
- List of Polish monarchs
- Duchy of Masovia
