= 1313 =

1313 in various calendars
- Gregorian calendar: 1313; MCCCXIII
- Ab urbe condita: 2066
- Armenian calendar: 762; ԹՎ ՉԿԲ
- Assyrian calendar: 6063
- Balinese saka calendar: 1234–1235
- Bengali calendar: 719–720
- Berber calendar: 2263
- English Regnal year: 6 Edw. 2 – 7 Edw. 2
- Buddhist calendar: 1857
- Burmese calendar: 675
- Byzantine calendar: 6821–6822
- Chinese calendar: 壬子年 (Water Rat); 4010 or 3803 — to — 癸丑年 (Water Ox); 4011 or 3804
- Coptic calendar: 1029–1030
- Discordian calendar: 2479
- Ethiopian calendar: 1305–1306
- Hebrew calendar: 5073–5074
- Hindu calendars
- Vikram Samvat: 1369–1370
- Shaka Samvat: 1234–1235
- Kali Yuga: 4413–4414
- Holocene calendar: 11313
- Igbo calendar: 313–314
- Iranian calendar: 691–692
- Islamic calendar: 712–713
- Japanese calendar: Shōwa 2 (正和２年)
- Javanese calendar: 1224–1225
- Julian calendar: 1313; MCCCXIII
- Korean calendar: 3646
- Minguo calendar: 599 before ROC 民前599年
- Nanakshahi calendar: −155
- Thai solar calendar: 1855–1856
- Tibetan calendar: ཆུ་ཕོ་བྱི་བ་ལོ་ (male Water-Rat); 1439 or 1058 or 286 — to — ཆུ་མོ་གླང་ལོ་ (female Water-Ox); 1440 or 1059 or 287

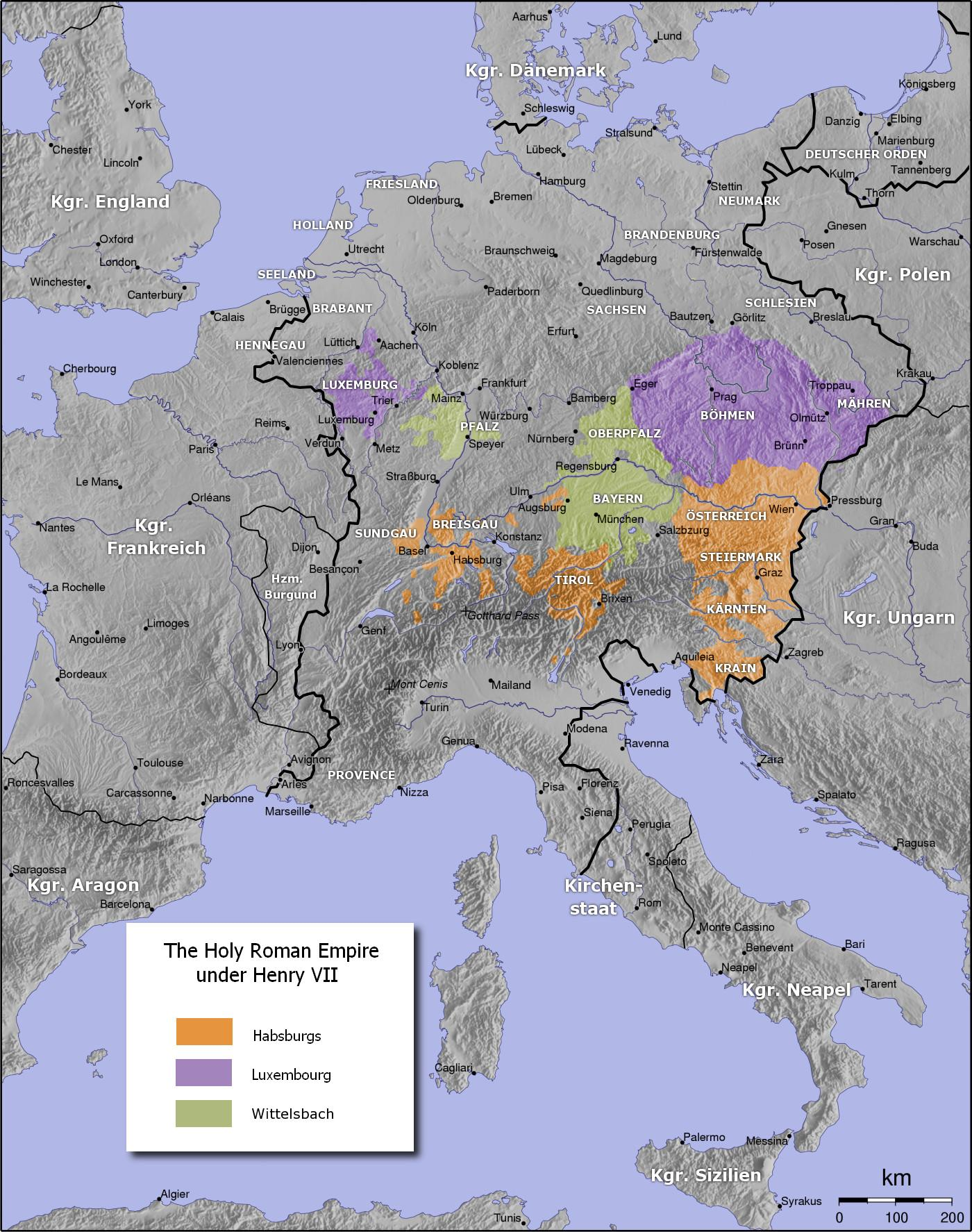
Holy Roman Empire under Henry VII

Year 1313 (MCCCXIII) was a common year starting on Monday of the Julian calendar.

== Events ==
=== January – March ===
- January 8 – King Robert the Bruce of Scotland recaptures Perth Castle from the English, then orders the walls and the building to be destroyed in order to prevent it from ever being used by the English again as a garrison.
- February 3 – William de Sancto Claro, the Bishop of Dunkeld and commonly known as William Sinclair, is issued a safe conduct pass by England's King Edward II in order to return to Scotland from Rome.
- February 7 – (12th waxing of Tabaung, 674 ME) In what is now the Mandalay Region of central Myanmar in Asia, Burmese King Thihathu proclaims the Pinya Kingdom, to separate the area from the Myinsaing Kingdom. Thihathu appoints his son, Kyawswa I of Pinya, to replace him as the Viceroy of Pinle in Myinsaing.
- March 28 – Francesco da Barberino of Tuscany receives a doctorate of both civil law and canonical law, by a bull issued by Pope Clement V.

=== April – June ===
- April 20 – The Duchy of Masovia in Poland is divided among the three sons of Boleslaw II upon his death, with Siemowit II creating the Duchy of Rawa (with a capital at Rawa Mazowiecka), Trojden receiving Czersk and Wenceslaus receiving Płock.
- April 22 – On the first Sunday after Easter, the French ship Ste Marie is shipwrecked on England's Isle of Wight at Chale Bay. Residents nearby loot the ship of its cargo, casks of wine belonging to Regimus de Depe of Aquitaine. As an act of penance, the Lord of Chale, Walder de Godeton, builds the St Catherine's Oratory.
- May 5 – Seventeen years after his death in prison in Ferentino, the later Pope Celestine V is canonized as a Roman Catholic saint.
- May 6 – In India, Veera Virupaksha Ballala, son and heir of Emperor Veera Ballala III of the Hoysala Empire, returns to the capital, Halebidu (now a ruins in the state of Karnataka), after two years as a hostage. Emperor Ballala III had agreed to leave his son behind at Delhi for two years as part of his surrender to the Delhi Sultan Alauddin Khalji.
- May 14 – In Poland, Bolko II of Opole and his brother Albert of Strzelce become the new rulers of Opole and Upper Silesia upon the death of their father, Bolko I.
- May 17 – Robert the Bruce, King of Scotland, leads an invasion of the Isle of Man, landing at Ramsey with a multitude of ships and captures it within five days. The only resistance is presented by the lord of Castle Rushen, and King Robert concentrates his efforts on a siege of the castle starting on May 22.
- May 28 – Thomas Cobham, Archdeacon of Lewes, is elected by his peers to be the Archbishop of Canterbury in England, but King Edward II intervenes and asks Pope Clement V to cancel the result. The Pope installs Walter Reynolds as the new archbishop on October 1.
- June 12 – Castle Rushen, on the Isle of Man, surrenders to Scotland's King Robert the Bruce after a siege of three weeks.
- June 13 – Pope Clement V declares Naples to be under papal protection. He names King Robert the Wise of Naples, "Senator of Rome".
- June 21 – In Germany, peace is made between Rudolf I, Duke of Bavaria, and his younger brother, Louis the Bavarian, with Rudolf having control of the Electoral Palatinate, in return for supporting the election of Louis as the next Holy Roman Emperor.
- June 24 – From the English garrison at Stirling Castle in Scottish territory, Sir Philip Mowbray proposes a truce with Edward Bruce, brother of King Robert the Bruce of Scotland, after a siege of "many months". Edward Bruce agrees to what Scottish historian Patrick Fraser Tytler will describe five centuries later as "a truce involving conditions which ought on no account to have been accepted." As Tytler notes, the effect "was to check the ardour of the Scots in that career of success, which was now rapidly leading to the complete deliverance of their country; it gave the King of England a whole year to assemble the strength of his dominions... We need not wonder, then, that Bruce was highly incensed, on hearing that, without consulting him, his brother had agreed to Mowbray's proposals."

=== July – September ===
- July 29 – In a complicated marital pact, Catherine of Valois–Courtenay, the Latin Empress of Constantinople, breaks her engagement to Hugh V, Duke of Burgundy, styled the King of Thessalonica in order to marry Philip I, Prince of Taranto, styled the King of Albania and Lord of Achaea. In exchange for Hugh's forbearance, Catherine cedes her lands to Hugh's sister, Joan the Lame, wife of Catherine's half-brother Philip of Valois, and Hugh becomes engaged to Joan of France. On the same day as Philip's marriage to Catherine, former fiancée of Hugh, Hugh's brother Louis of Burgundy marries Matilda of Hainaut (who had broken off her engagement to Philip of Taranto's son Charles of Taranto) and Philip of Taranto cedes the Principality of Achaea to Hugh and Matilda.
- August 8 – Emperor Henry VII begins a campaign against King Robert of Naples ("Robert the Wise"). Henry's allies are loath to join him and his 15,000-man army, supported by 4,000 knights, while the imperial fleet is prepared to attack King Robert's realm directly.
- August 9 – In the town of Horsens in Denmark, Eric of Jutland reaches a settlement with King Eric VI Menved and receives the Duchy of Schleswig in return for renouncing all claims to Langeland.
- August 24 – A week after contracting malaria during the siege of the Tuscan city of Siena, the Holy Roman Emperor Henry VII dies of malaria at Buonconvento. His 17-year-old son, John of Bohemia, will succeed him and will become one of the seven prince-electors of the Holy Roman Empire. Upon learning of the Henry's death, Louis, Duke of Bavaria goes to war against his cousin, Frederick the Fair, Duke of Austria and Styria, as both compete to be elected the new Emperor, a competition which will eventually be resolved in favour of Louis.
- September 23 – The English Parliament is called into session for the fourth time in less than 12 months, after three unsuccessful attempts to assemble members. King Edward II persuades the session to pass a tax bill for revenues to be collected by the following June in order to finance a new campaign against Scotland.

=== October – December ===
- October 21 – Robert the Bruce, King of Scotland delivers an ultimatum at a meeting of the Scottish nobles at an assembly in Dundee, giving Scots who have not yet come into his peace agreement a year to swear fealty to him or lose all their estates. The Scottish nobles of Lothian appeal to Edward II for protection, who promises to bring an English expeditionary force by midsummer in 1314.
- November 9 – Battle of Gammelsdorf: German forces led by Louis IV the Bavarian" defeat his cousin Frederick the Fair, at Gammelsdorf, who is supported by Leopold I the Glorious, Duke of Austria. During the battle, Louis' smaller force does not pursue Frederick's defeated army. He is forced to renounce his tutelage over the young dukes of Lower Bavaria (Henry XIV, Otto IV and Henry XV). The conflict causes a stir within the Holy Roman Empire.
- November 18 – Queen Constance of Portugal, mother of the 2-year-old King Alfonso XI dies. Alfonso's grandmother Queen dowager María de Molina, his uncle Peter of Castile, and his great-uncle John of Castile divide the regency over the young Alfonso. While Maria takes charge of his education, the infantes, especially Peter, assume the duty of defending Castile.
- December 26 – Three days after receiving authorization from the English Parliament for a feudal levy, King Edward II issues a summons for eight earls and 87 barons to muster their troops at Berwick-upon-Tweed by June 10 for an invasion of Scotland.

=== By place ===
==== Asia ====
- Tran Anh Tong, emperor of Annam (Northern Vietnam), occupies Champa (Southern Vietnam) and establishes the Cham royal dynasty as puppet rulers.

=== By topic ===
==== Literature ====
- Wang Zhen, Chinese agronomist, government official and inventor of wooden-based movable type printing, publishes the Nong Shu ("Book of Agriculture").

==== Religion ====
- King Stefan Milutin, one of the most powerful rulers of Serbia, founds the Banjska Monastery (approximate date).

== Births ==
- February 9 – Maria of Portugal, queen consort of Castile (d. 1357)
- February 14 – Thomas Beauchamp, English nobleman (d. 1369)
- April 17 – Constantine III of Armenia, king of Cilician Armenia (d. 1362)
- June 16 – Giovanni Boccaccio, Italian poet and writer (d. 1375)
- July 20 – John Tiptoft, English nobleman and chancellor (d. 1367)
- August 1 – Kōgon, emperor of Japan (Northern Court) (d. 1364)
- November 16 – Ibn al-Khatib, Arab polymath and writer (d. 1374)
- date unknown
  - Bartolus de Saxoferrato, Italian professor and jurist (d. 1357)
  - Blanche of France, French princess (House of Capet) (d. 1358)
  - Cola di Rienzo, Italian ruler (de facto) and politician (d. 1354)
  - Guy of Boulogne, French archbishop and diplomat (d. 1373)

== Deaths ==
- February 28 – John Hastings, English nobleman, knight and peer (b. 1262)
- April 13 – Guillaume de Nogaret, French statesman and councillor (b. 1260)
- April 20 – Bolesław II, Polish nobleman, prince and co-ruler (House of Piast)
- May 11 – Robert Winchelsey, English archbishop and theologian (b. 1245)
- May 14 – Bolko I, Polish nobleman and co-ruler (House of Piast) (b. 1258)
- June 18 – John de Burgh ("John Burke"), Irish nobleman and knight (b. 1286)
- July 24 – Ralph Baldock (Ralph Baldoc), English bishop and Lord Chancellor
- July 27 – Bernhard of Prambach, German bishop (b. 1220)
- August 10 – Guido de Baysio, Italian canonist, professor, jurist and writer
- August 24 – Henry VII, Holy Roman Emperor (b. 1273)
- September 8 – Rupen of Montfort, Cypriot nobleman (House of Montfort)
- September 13 – Notburga of Eben, Austrian peasant and saint (b. 1265)
- September 24 – Philip Despenser, English nobleman and knight (b. 1290)
- September 29 – Imagina of Limburg, queen consort of Germany (b. 1255)
- October 28 – Elisabeth of Carinthia, queen consort of Germany (b. 1262)
- November 18 – Constance of Portugal, queen consort of Castile (b. 1290)
- November 26 – Thomas de Multon, English nobleman and knight (b. 1276)
- date unknown
  - Baldwin of Ibelin, Cypriot nobleman and knight (House of Ibelin)
  - Baybars al-Ala'i, Mamluk nobleman and governor (House of Bahri)
  - Bolad ("Chingsang"), Mongol minister, diplomat and chancellor
  - Gonsalvus of Spain, Spanish priest, theologian and philosopher
  - Martim Afonso Chichorro, Portuguese nobleman and knight (b. 1250)
  - Rudolf I, German nobleman, knight and co-ruler (House of Zähringen)
  - Simon of Clermont, French nobleman and bishop (House of Clermont)
  - Takatsukasa Mototada, Japanese nobleman (Fujiwara Clan) (b. 1247)
  - Tekle Haymanot ("Tekle the Righteous"), Ethiopian monk and hermit (b. 1215)
  - Walter de Huntercombe, English nobleman and governor (b. 1247)
  - Walter de Thornbury, Irish cleric, statesman and Lord Chancellor
