= Siemowit of Masovia =

Siemowit of Masovia may refer to these Masovian dukes:

- Siemowit I of Masovia (1224–1262), son of Konrad I of Masovia and his wife Agafia
- Siemowit II of Masovia (1283–1345), son of Boleslaus II of Masovia and his first wife Sophie
- Siemowit III of Masovia (ca. 1320–1381), son of Trojden I of Masovia and his wife Maria
- Siemowit IV of Masovia (ca. 1352–1425 or 1426), son of Siemowit III and his wife Euphemia
- Siemowit V of Masovia (1388–1442), son of Siemowit IV and his wife Alexandra of Lithuania
- Siemowit VI of Masovia (1444–1462), a Duke of Masovia
