= Gaudemunda of Lithuania =

Lithuanian royal (c.1260–1288 or 1313)

Gaudemunda Sophia of Lithuania (also Gaudimantė; c. 1260 – 1282 or 1313) was the daughter of Traidenis, Grand Duke of Lithuania (c. 1270–1282). In 1279, she married Duke of Masovia Bolesław II (c. 1254–1313) of the Piast dynasty. He was the son of Ziemowit I, Prince of Masovia, and Pereyaslava, daughter of Daniel of Galicia of the Rurik dynasty.

Her husband united the Duchy of Masovia and then divided it between their sons, who were:

- Siemowit II
  - Received the Duchy of Rawa
- Trojden I (named after Gaudemunda's father, Traidenis, c. 1285 – 13 March 1341)
  - Received the Duchy of Czersk and Warsaw
  - Married his cousin Maria, daughter of George I of Halych
  - Great-grandfather of Cymburgis of Masovia
- Wenceslaus (from his second marriage to Kunigunde of Bohemia)
  - Received the Duchy of Płock
