= Euphrosyne of Masovia =

Duchess consort of Oświęcim
- Reign: 1306 – between 5 December 1321 and 15 May 1324
- Born: 1292
- Died: 1328/1329
- Burial: Kraków
- Spouse: Władysław of Oświęcim
- Issue: Jan I the Scholastic; Anna; Daughter
- House: Piast
- Father: Bolesław II of Masovia
- Mother: Kunigunde of Bohemia

Euphrosyne of Masovia also known as Eufrozja (1292–1328/1329) was Duchess of Oświęcim by her marriage. She served in the regency of her son John, in the duchy of Oświęcim.

== Life ==
Euphrosyne was the daughter of Bolesław II of Masovia, Prince of Płock and his second wife Kunigunde, daughter of Ottokar II of Bohemia. The genesis of her name is unknown. This is the first and the last time that princess of Masovian lineage of Piast was named Eufrozyna. Modern Polish historians usually named her Eufrozyna, but in sources she was mentioned mostly as Eufrazja.

Her younger brother was Prince Wenceslaus of Płock (c. 1295–1336). Eufrozyna had siblings from previous father's marriage. They were Siemowit II, Trojden I and wife of Władysław Prince of Leginca (her name is unknown).

The date of birth of Euphrosyne is unknown. Her parents married in 1291, so she could be born not earlier than in 1292. According to genealogist Oswald Balzer Euphrosyne was born in 1292. This theory was based on fact that she must be at least 14 years old, when she get married in 1306 (her son Jan I was born in 1307).

The exact date of Euphrosyne's marriage to Władysław of Oświęcim is unknown. Genealogists assume that the marriage was concluded between 1304 and 1309, indicating the year 1306. The couple were already connected by a marriage. Euphrosyne's cousin Wenceslaus III of Bohemia was married to Władysław's sister Viola Elisabeth of Cieszyn.

Euphrosyne's husband died between 15 December 1321 and 15 May 1324. She participated in the regency of her son John, who was now ruler of the duchy of Oświęcim.

She participated in the government until at least 14 November 1328. It was the last time that she was mentioned in documents.

According to Nekrolog dominikanów krakowskich she died on 26 December. The year of her death is disputed. She may died shortly after 1327, may be yet in 1328.

Euphrosyne was buried in the Dominican monastery in Kraków.

Euphrosyne and Władysław had two or three children:

1. Jan I the Scholastic (b. 1308/10 - d. by 29 September 1372).
2. Anna (d. 19 September 1354), married Tamás Szécsényi (Tomasz Szechenyi), obergespan of Arad, Bács and Szerém.
3. probably also a daughter, a nun in Dominican monastery in Racibórz.
