= Jan I the Scholastic =

- Duke of Oświęcim
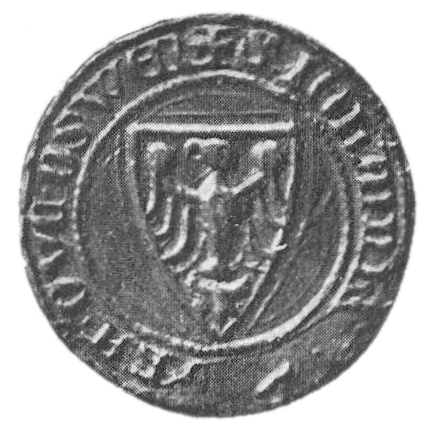
- Seal of Jan I the Scholastic (1344).
- Born: 1308/10
- Died: 1372 before 29 September
- Noble family: Silesian Piasts of Opole
- Spouses: unknown Salome Reuss
- Issue: Jan II of Oświęcim
- Father: Władysław of Oświęcim
- Mother: Euphrosyne of Masovia

Jan I the Scholastic (Polish: Jan I Scholastyk; 1308/10 – 1372 before 29 September), was a Duke of Oświęcim from 1324 until his death.

He was the eldest child and only son of Duke Władysław of Oświęcim by his wife Euphrosyne, daughter of Duke Boleslaus II of Masovia.

== Life ==
Despite the fact that he was the only heir of his father, Jan was destined since his childhood for a church career. On 15 December 1321 he received the title of scholastic in Kraków.

After Władysław's death between 1321 and 1324, Jan succeeded him in Oświęcim and in consequence was forced to leave his spiritual career. During the first year of his reign (1324–1325), he was placed under the regency of his mother, the Dowager Duchess Euphrosyne, who remained involved in the government of the duchy until her death, in 1329.

Even after he left his Church career, Jan continued to receive the revenues generated from his former title of scholastic in Kraków, which caused the intervention of Pope Gregory XI: Jan was forced to pay 5,000 grzywnas and 500 florins as compensation for damages. The participation of troops who attacked the monasteries of Mogile and Rudy, both in Jan's territory, was not without significance.

In foreign policy, Jan became a faithful ally of the House of Luxembourg. On 24 February 1327, together with the other Piast Dukes, Jan paid homage to King John of Bohemia in Opava. In 1336, Jan was forced to accept the annexation of the Duchy of Racibórz to the Duchy of Troppau (Opava) ruled by royal bastard line of the Přemyslids.

In 1355 Jan participated in the congress in Prague, where a dispute was resolved between the Dukes of Cieszyn and Oleśnica for the division of the Duchy of Bytom. The dispute was only resolved after Jan's mediation in 1369.

Jan died in 1372 (before 29 September) and was buried in the Dominican monastery in Oświęcim. His generosity to the Church was recognized by the Provincial Chapter of Płock in 1372, when prayers for the soul of the deceased Duke were ordered in the whole country.

== Marriage and issue ==
The name of Jan's first wife was unknown. They had one son:

1. Jan II (b. ca. 1344/51 – d. 19 February 1376).

After 12 July 1359, Jan married secondly Salome (b. ca. 1345/50 – d. aft. 9 November 1400), daughter of Henry II Reuss, Vogt of Plauen. They had no children.

Jan I the Scholastic House of Piast Born: between 1308 and 1310 Died: c. 29 September 1372
Preceded by Władysław	Duke of Oświęcim; 1324–1372	Succeeded by Jan II
