= Bolesław of Dobrzyń =

Duke of Dobrzyń
- Born: 1304
- Died: 1328 (aged 23-24)
- House: House of Piast

Bolesław of Dobrzyń (pl: Boleslaw dobrzyński; betw. 1303/06 - 1 October 1327/12 March 1329, most probably in 1328), was a Polish prince, member of the House of Piast. He was Duke of Dobrzyń during 1312-1327 (until 1316 under the regency of his mother and since them under the tutelage of his oldest brother) and Duke of Łęczyca since 1327 jointly with his brother.

He was the fourth or second son of Siemowit of Dobrzyń and Anastasia Lvovna of Halych–Volhynia. It is unknown after whom he was named; probably was in honour to Bolesław II of Płock, his father's cousin.

== Life ==
Bolesław never ruled by himself. After his father's death in 1312 he was under the regency of his mother and uncle, Władysław I the Elbow-high, and since 1316 he remained under the guardianship of his oldest surviving brother Władysław, with whom he jointly issued documents from 1322. He appeared for the first time in sources, together with his mother and brother, in a document dated 10 July 1316 and issued by Florian, Bishop of Płock concerning with the payment of tithes. In 1323 together with his brother Władysław, he founded a hospital for the Order of the Holy Sepulchre at Rypin. His last mention in documents was on 20 March 1326.

It is known that Bolesław took part in the exchange of the district of Dobrzyń for Łęczyca, which was made after the threats of the Teutonic Order and concluded in 1327/1328 between the princes and their uncle Władysław I the Elbow-high. This agreement was formalized on 1 October 1327, and on 12 March 1329 Władysław the Hunchback issued the first known document without Bolesław. It's unknown if the brothers ever divided the Duchy of Łęczyca, although is also known that Bolesław issued documents alone. Therefore, is considered that Bolesław died between 1 October 1327 and 12 March 1329. Is believed that his death occurred in 1328, shortly after the change of the Duchies, because only few witnesses remember that he took part in it. It's unknown if he married or had offspring and the place of his burial.
