= Passional of Abbess Kunigunde =

- Prague, National Library of the Czech Republic (XIV A 17)
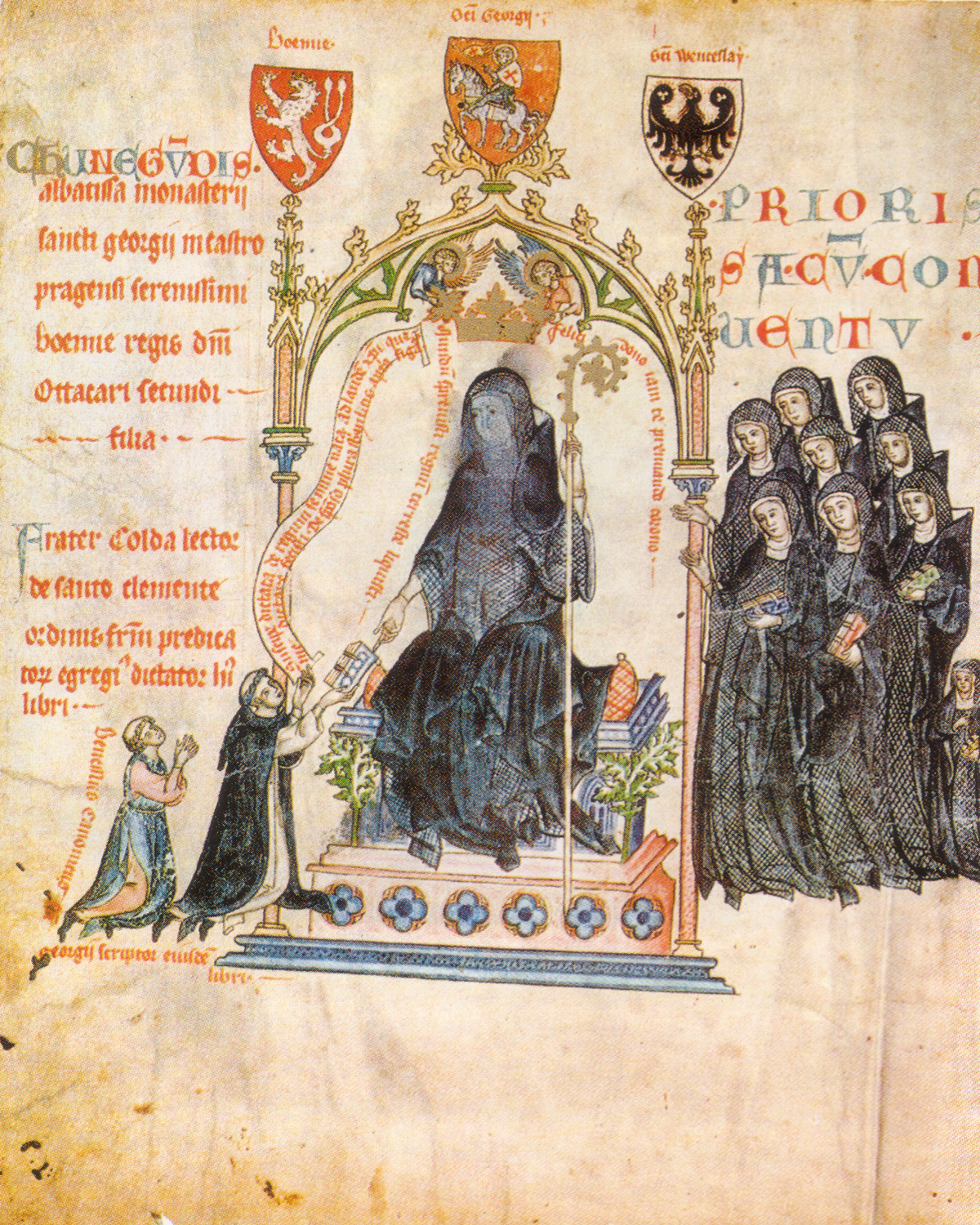
- Dedication Illustration on fol. 1v
- Date: between 1312 and 1321
- Place of origin: Prague, Bohemia, Holy Roman Empire
- Language: Latin
- Scribe: canon Beneš
- Author(s): Kolda of Koldice and others
- Compiled by: canon Beneš
- Illuminated by: maybe Beneš
- Patron: Kunigunde of Bohemia, abbess of the St. George's Convent in Prague
- Material: parchment
- Size: 37 leaves
- Format: 30 x 25 cm
- Previously kept: St. George's Convent

The Passional of Abbess Kunigunde (Note: Alternative names: Passional of Abbess Cunegund, Passional of Abbess Kunhuta.) is an illuminated Latin manuscript commissioned by Prague Benedictine Abbess Kunigunde of Bohemia, daughter of King Ottokar II, after 1312. The work is an anthology of mystic treatises on the theme of Christ‘s passion, two of them were composed by Czech Dominican friar Kolda of Koldice. The manuscript was written and maybe also illuminated by Prague canon Beneš, who served as a priest in the St. George's Convent.

The earliest surviving coloured depiction of the heraldic emblem of Bohemia (today the Lesser coat of arms of the Czech Republic) can be found in the manuscript.

== Gallery ==
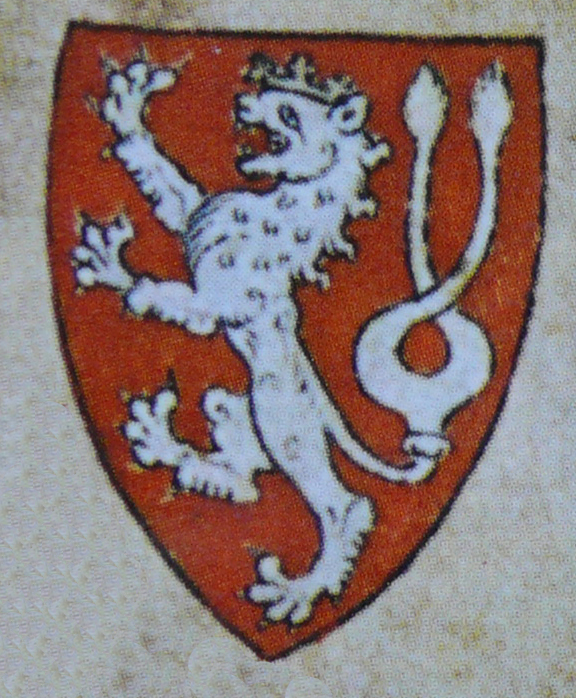
Coat of arms of Bohemia

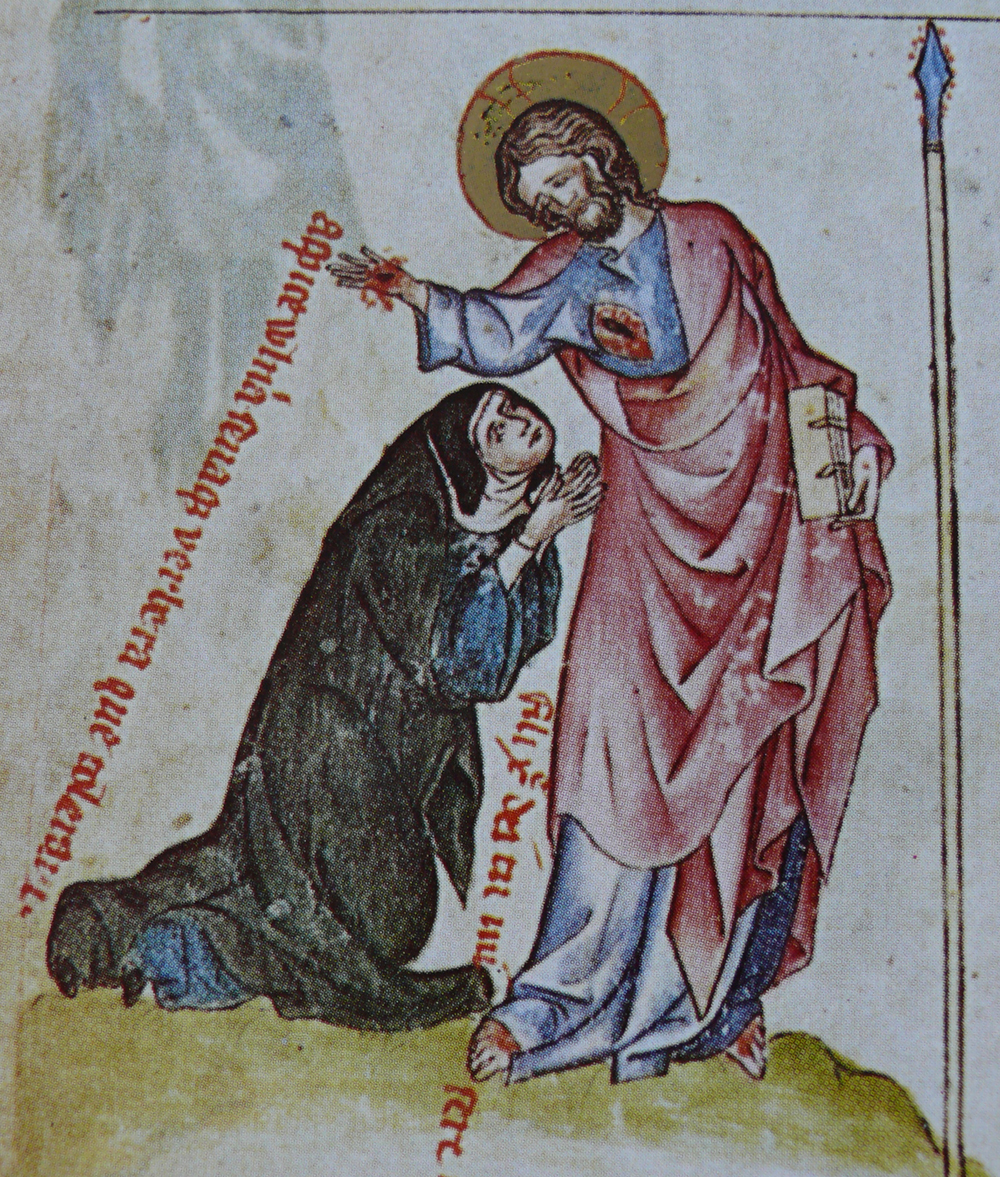
Kunigunde and Jesus

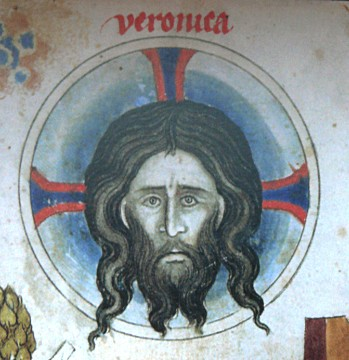
The Holy Face

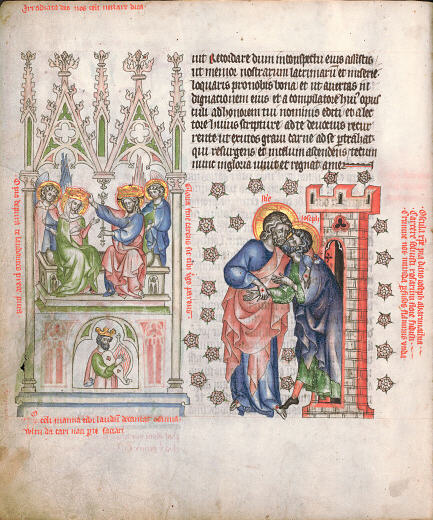
Fol. 17v

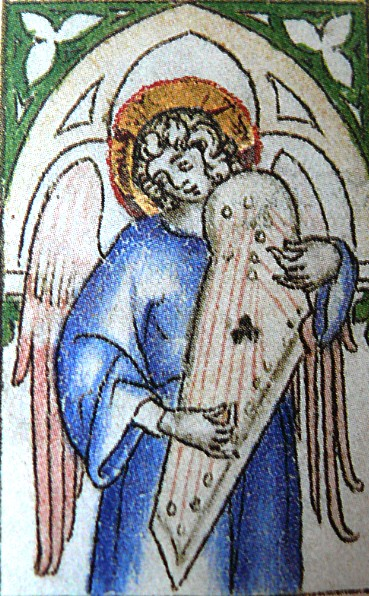
Angel
