= Bolesław III of Płock =

Bolesław III of Płock (pl: Bolesław III płocki; 1322/30 – 20 August 1351), was a Polish prince member of the House of Piast, Duke of Płock since 1336 (under regency until 1340), ruler over Wizna and Sochaczew since 1345, formally a vassal of the Kingdom of Bohemia during all his reign.

He was the only son of Wenceslaus of Płock and Dannila (Elisabeth), a daughter of Gediminas, Grand Duke of Lithuania.

== Life ==
A minor at the time of his father's death in 1336, Bolesław III inherited his domains under the regency of his paternal uncles Siemowit II and Trojden I until 1340, when he attained his majority and began his personal government. Five years later (1345), the death of Siemowit II childless allowed him to inherit the districts of Wizna and Sochaczew.

Probably since the beginning of his reign, Bolesław III paid homage to King John of Bohemia, who guaranteed the integrity of his domains, located between two powerful neighbors, the Teutonic Order and Poland. In order to continue under the protection of Bohemia even in the case of the King's death, on 30 September 1341 Bolesław III renewed his homage, this time to Prince Charles, eldest son and heir of King John.

In 1343 Bolesław III, jointly with the other Masovian rulers, confirmed the Treaty of Kalisz and agreed to resign the district of Chełmno to Gdańsk Pomerania.

However, during the second half of the 1340s Bolesław III began to distance from his policy of cooperation with the Kingdom of Bohemia, and began to approached to the Polish King Casimir III the Great. At some point, even Bolesław III agreed to name the Polish King his heir in default of male offspring, which clearly was against the policy of the Luxembourg dynasty, rulers of Bohemia.

In 1351 Bolesław III, together with Casimir III the Great and Louis I of Hungary, took part in the expedition against his maternal uncle Kęstutis, Grand Duke of Lithuania. The campaign was a complete success, especially since on 15 August 1351 was concluded with the Lithuanians a truce under which Kęstutis accept Christianity and to this end, he was placed under the care of the Duke of Płock as an honorable prisoner. However, soon became notorious that Kęstutis had no intentions to comply with the agreement, because five days later (20 August), he decided to escape in his route to Buda after attacked Boleslaw III by surprise with his troops. In his persecution of Kęstutis, Bolesław III was killed at Mělník by an arrow from a bow, and the Lithuanian Grand Duke, without difficulties, could escape to his domains. He was buried at Płock Cathedral (according to the reports of Jan Długosz).

Because Bolesław III died unmarried and childless, after his death his domains were divided. King Casimir III took Płock and Wizna and the Duke's cousins Siemowit III and Casimir I obtained Gostynin and Sochaczew. Despite this, Bolesław III's brother-in-law Henry V of Żagań obtained the investiture of the whole Duchy of Płock from the Bohemian Kingdom, but he never could conquer the land.
