= Siemowit III of Masovia =

14th-century prince of Masovia, modern-day Poland

Siemowit III
- Duke of Masovia
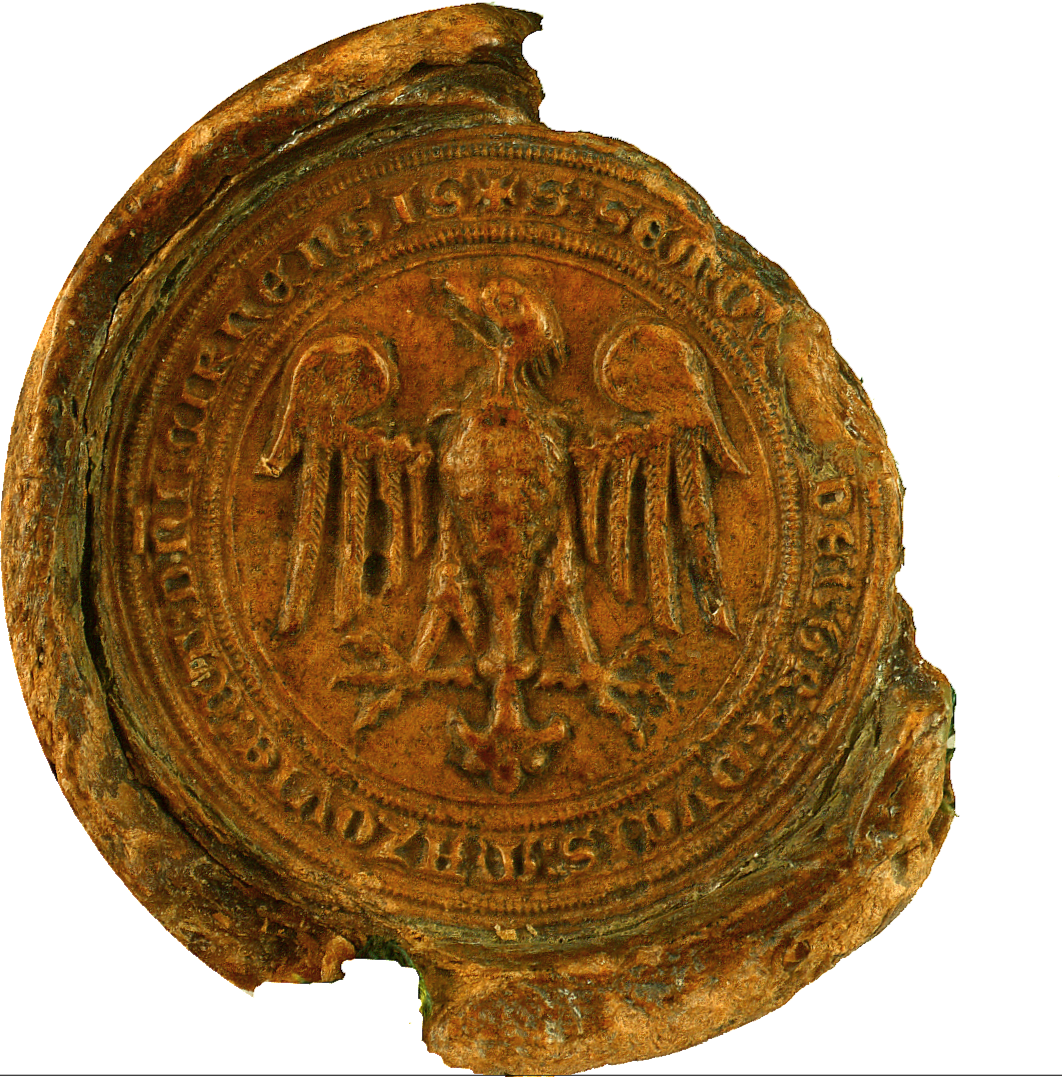
- Princely seal of Siemowit III; 1371
- Born: c. 1320
- Died: 16 June 1381
- Buried: Płock Cathedral
- Noble family: Piast
- Spouses: Euphemia of Opava; Anna of Ziębice
- Issue: Euphemia; Anna; Janusz I of Warsaw; Margaret; Siemowit IV of Masovia; Henry of Masovia
- Father: Trojden I of Masovia
- Mother: Maria of Galicia

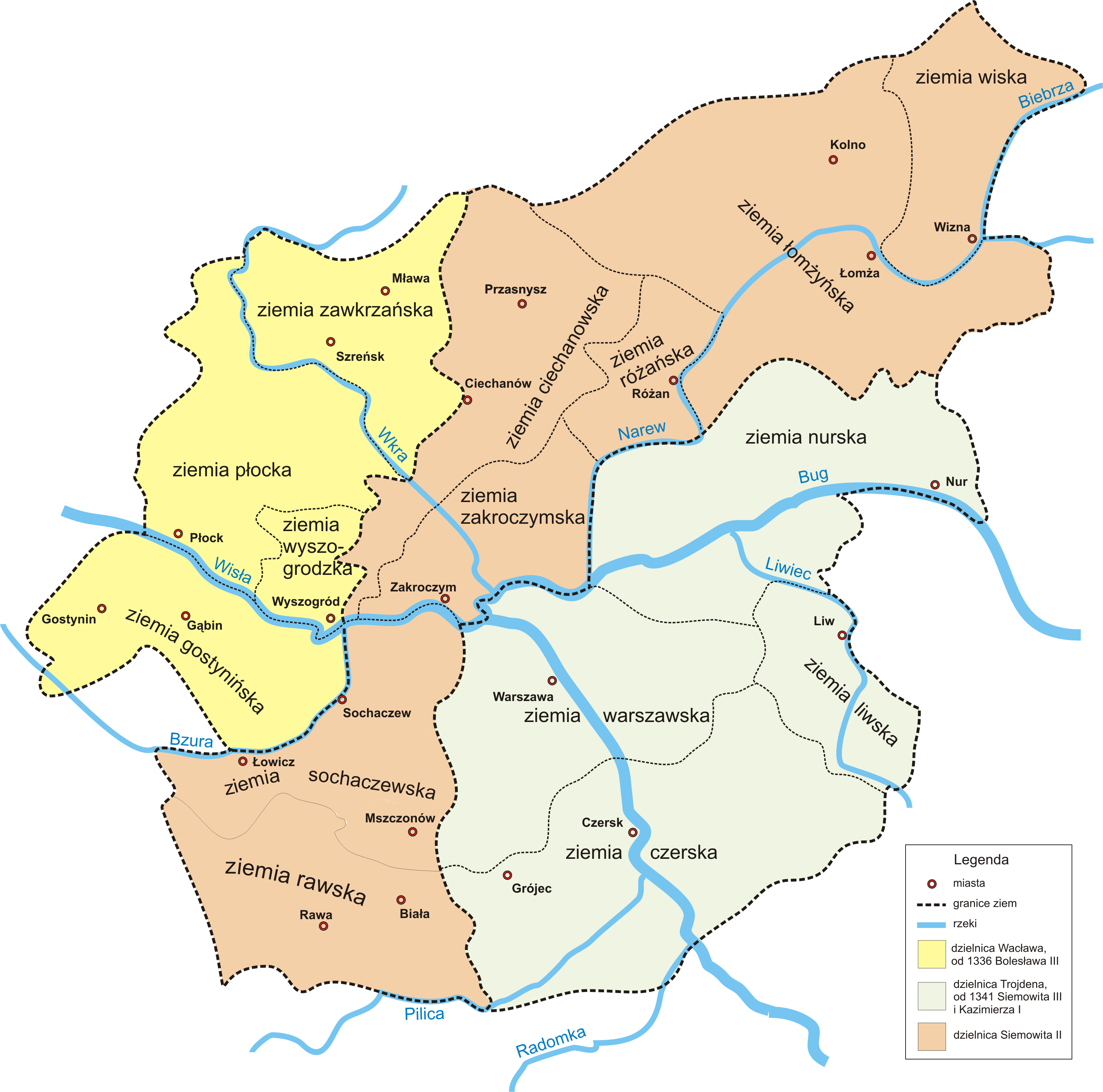
Administrative division of Masovia (1313–1345)

Siemowit III of Masovia (alternatively Ziemowit III; c. 1320 – 1381) was a prince of Masovia and a co-regent (with his brother Casimir I of Warsaw) of the lands of Warsaw, Czersk, Rawa, Gostynin and other parts of Masovia.

== Life ==
Siemowit was the second son of Trojden I of Masovia and his wife Maria, daughter of Yuri I of Galicia.

In 1341, following the death of their father and brother, Siemowit and his younger brother Casimir inherited the Duchy of Czersk. In 1345 following the death of their uncle Siemowit II of Rawa, they also inherited the Duchy of Rawa. In 1349 the two brothers shared their possessions. Siemowit gave the small region of Warsaw to his brother Casimir, retaining the regions of Czersk, Liw and Rawa.

Early in his reign, Siemowit tried to establish good neighborly relations with his powerful neighbors: the Teutonic Order, Poland and Bohemia. Some historians believe that Siemowit rendered a tribute of vassalage to Charles IV, Holy Roman Emperor in 1346. Other historians say this happened in 1351, in order to inherit from Bolesław III of Płock who was a vassal of Bohemia.

But on 18 September 1351 Siemowit and Casimir recognised the Polish King Casimir III the Great as suzerain, canceling the allegiance of Masovia and Bohemia. In exchange, they got Gostynin (Siemowit) and Sochaczew (Casimir), former possessions of Boleslaw III. Casimir also gave the Duchy of Płock to the brothers.

When his brother Casimir died unexpectedly in 1355, Casimir III the Great left the Duchy of Warsaw to Siemowit. In exchange, he promised never to ally with enemies of Poland and the Duchy of Płock would return to Poland, unless Casimir III died without an heir. In addition, Casimir III offered Siemowit a small territory of Lesser Poland bounded by the river Pilica and Radomka.

From that time, relations between Siemowit and Casimir III the Great become increasingly narrow. In 1363, Siemowit was invited to Kraków for the marriage of Elizabeth of Pomerania, granddaughter of the king of Poland, with the Emperor Charles IV. In September 1364 he participated in a conference in Kraków, which offered five crowned kings, dukes and princes extravagant festivities and tournaments. In 1369 Margaret, the daughter of Siemowit, wife of Casimir IV, Duke of Pomerania, adopted an illegitimate son of Casimir III the Great. At that time, Casimir IV of Słupsk was one of the contenders to succeed Casimir III the Great, who left only daughters.

When Casimir III the Great died in 1370, under agreements concluded with one of his lifetime friends Siemowit III, he freed Siemowit from Polish suzerainty and gave Płock, Wizna, Wyszogród and Zakroczym back to Masovia. Having a reunified Masovia, it regained its independence, there Siemowit III promulgates a customary law in 1377. He reformed the administration, justice and the monetary system.

In 1373/1374 he gave the regions of Warsaw and Rawa to his sons, Siemowit IV of Masovia and Janusz I of Warsaw.

== Marriages and issue ==
In 1335, Siemowit married Euphemia, daughter of Nicholas II of Opava. They had the following children:

1. Anna (before 1345 – c. 1403)
2. Euphemia (c. 1352 – 1424), married Vladislaus II of Opole
3. Janusz I the Old (1347/1352 – 1429)
4. Margaret (before 1358 – 1388/1396)
5. Siemowit IV of Masovia (c. 1353/1356 – 21 January 1426), succeeded his father as Duke of Masovia.

Siemowit remarried, after Euphemia's death to Anna, daughter of Nicolas of Ziębice. From this marriage he had three children:

1. unnamed son (1361/1364 – 1378)
2. unnamed son (1362/1365 – 1378)
3. Henry of Masovia (1368/1370–1392/1393)

Siemowit accused Anna of adultery when she became pregnant with Henry. After his birth Siemowit had Anna strangled and Henry cast away. However, it turned out Henry was the son of Siemowit so he was made a bishop.

After working his whole life on reuniting Masovia and making it an independent state, Siemowit III died on 16 June 1381, and was buried at Płock Cathedral.
