= Casimir I of Warsaw =

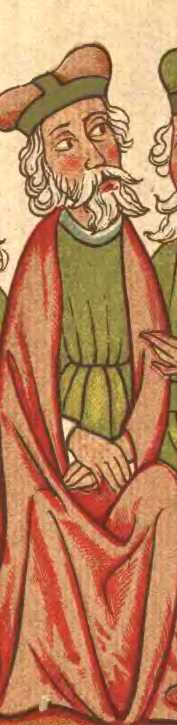
Casimir I

Casimir I of Warsaw (pl: Kazimierz I warszawski; 1329/31 – 26 November/5 December 1355), was a Polish prince, member of the House of Piast, Duke of Czersk 1341–1349 jointly with his brother, after 1345 ruler over Rawa Mazowiecka jointly with his brother, after 1349 sole ruler over Warsaw, after 1351 sole ruler over Sochaczew, Polish vassal since 1351.

He was traditionally regarded as the third and youngest son of Trojden I of Czersk and Maria, daughter of Yuri I, King of Halych-Volhynia. In a 2026 archaeogenetic study published in Nature Communications, skeletal remains designated PIAST09 were attributed to Casimir I of Warsaw; on the basis of Y-chromosome evidence, the study's authors argued that he was not the biological son of Trojden I.

== Life ==
After the death of his father in 1341, Casimir I ruled jointly with his oldest surviving brother Siemowit III, and four years later (1345), both brothers inherited Rawa Mazowiecka from their uncle Siemowit II.

The formal division of the paternal inheritance took place in 1349, when Casimir I received the small district of Warsaw, being the first time that this district became in the capital of a Piast Dukedom.

In 1351, Casimir I increased his patrimony with the district of Sochaczew, which he received after the death of his cousin Bolesław III.

On 18 September 1351, Casimir I and Siemowit II decided to paid homage to the Polish King Casimir III the Great. In return of their submission, the Masovian Dukes received the promise that if the King died without sons, the entire inheritance of Bolesław III passed to them. In fact, they received the main district of Bolesław III, Płock immediately, but in exchange of a payment of 2,000 fines.

Casimir I died between 26 November and 5 December 1355 and was buried at Płock Cathedral. Because he never married or had children, his district of Warsaw as an emptied fief was reverted to King Casimir III; however, he agreed to transfer the entire estate to Siemowit III in exchange of a monetary compensation.
