= Władysław of Oświęcim =

Polish duke

Władysław
- Duke of Oświęcim
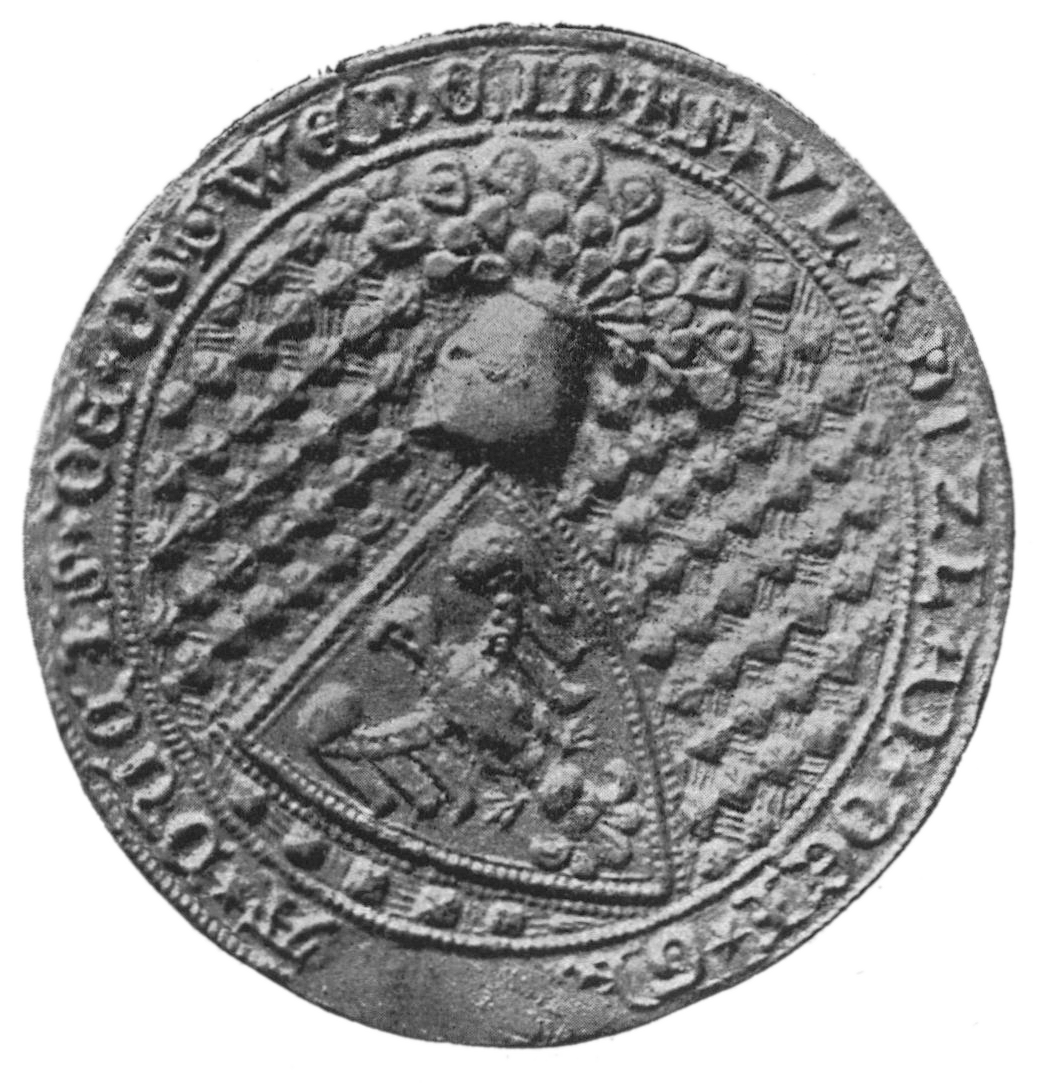
- Władysław 's seal, dated to 1317.
- Born: 1275/80
- Died: by 15 May 1324
- Noble family: Silesian Piasts of Opole
- Spouse: Euphrosyne of Masovia
- Issue: Jan I the Scholastic; Anna
- Father: Mieszko I, Duke of Cieszyn
- Mother: ?Grzymisława Vsevolodovna of Belz

Władysław of Oświęcim (Polish: Władysław oświęcimski; 1275/80 – by 15 May 1324), was a Duke of Oświęcim from 1315 until his death.

He was the eldest son of Mieszko I, Duke of Cieszyn by his wife, probably called Grzymisława.

== Life ==
In 1290, shortly after his father assumed control over the Duchy of Cieszyn, Władysław was named co-ruler by him. However, and for unknown reasons, after Mieszko I's death in 1315, Władysław didn't receive the capital Cieszyn, but the much less political Oświęcim, which began his later political conflicts with his brother Casimir I. This also contributed to Władysław's involvement in politics at the side of his namesake the Duke of Kraków, since 1320 King Władysław I the Elbow-high of Poland (in a document of 1315 is called an ally of the Duke of Kraków).

The exact date of Władysław's death is unknown, but is estimated between 1321 and 14 May 1324. He was buried in the Dominican church of Oświęcim.

== Marriage and issue ==
By 1304, Władysław married Euphrosyne (b. ca. 1292 – d. 26 December 1328/1329), daughter of Duke Bolesław II of Masovia. They had two children:

1. Jan I the Scholastic (b. 1308/10 – d. by 29 September 1372).
2. Anna (d. after 19 September 1354), married Thomas Szécsényi, obergespan of Arad, Bács and Szerém.

| Preceded by new creation | Duke of Oświęcim; 1315–1324 | Succeeded by Jan I the Scholastic |
