= Siemowit of Dobrzyń =

Polish prince member of the House of Piast

Siemowit of Dobrzyń (pl: Siemowit dobrzyński; c. 1262/67 – 1312), was a Polish prince member of the House of Piast, Duke of Brześć Kujawski during 1267–1288, Duke of Dobrzyń during 1288–1293, 1295–1303 and 1305–1312, during 1293–1295 in captivity in Lithuania, during 1303–1305 deposed, after 1306 hereditary vassal of the Kingdom of Poland.

He was the fifth son of Casimir I of Kuyavia, but the third born from his third marriage with Euphrosyne, daughter of Casimir I of Opole.

== Life ==
After the death of his father in 1267, Siemowit, together with his full-brothers, inherited their share of his lands under the regency of their mother until 1275, when they jointly ruled. Around 1287 as a result of the customary divisionary treaty between his brothers, he received the district of Dobrzyń

The government of the frontiers of his Duchy weren't easy for Siemowit, and in 1293 he was captured by the Lithuanians during an invasion. He could escape two years later, in 1295. During his absence, the rule was exercised by his brother Władysław I the Elbow-high, who after his return handed back the power to Siemowit.

After his release, Siemowit lead a more independent policy; around 1296 he married with Anastasia, daughter of Leo I of Halych-Peremyshl; this wedding was probably inspired by Władysław I, whose disastrous policy caused the coronation of Wenceslaus II of Bohemia as King of Poland in 1300 and forced Siemowit to paid homage to him.

Siemowit's acceptance of Wenceslaus II's kingship caused in 1303 a rebellion in his domains, probably instigated by a bitter opponent of Wenceslaus II, Leszek of Inowrocław. Siemowit was restored in his Duchy only in 1305, and after this, he opted for support his brother Władysław I.

Because he had numerous contacts with his nearest neighbors, the Teutonic Order, is considered that Siemowit was behind the idea of bringing them to fight against Brandenburg in Gdańsk Pomerania, who at the end, bring disastrous consequences to Poland.

His refusal to continue to pay the tithes, caused that Siemowit and his family where excommunicated; the curse was removed only after the Duke's death in 1316.

Siemowit probably died in 1312, although older historiography, led by Oswald Balzer, believed that he died in 1306, during the great Lithuanian invasion to Dobrzyń. However, this idea, as a result of the discovering of documents certifying that Siemowit was alive at this point, was currently abandoned. It's unknown where he was buried.

== Marriage and issue ==
By 1296, Siemowit married with Anastasia Lvovna of Halych–Volhynia (d. 12 March 1335), daughter of Leo I of Halych-Peremyshl. They had five children:

- Leszek (bef. 1302 - bef. 10 July 1316).
- Władysław (bef. 1303 - 5 June 1351/April 1352).
- Casimir (bef. 1304 - bef. 10 July 1316).
- Bolesław (bef. 1305 - 1 October 1327/12 March 1329).
- Judith (d. aft. 24 September 1313).

Because his sons are minor at the time of his death, the regency was exercised jointly by his widow and his brother Władysław I.

== Ancestry ==
Casimir II of Poland
Konrad I of Masovia
Helen of Znojmo
Casimir I of Kuyavia
Svyatoslav III Igorevich
Agafia of Rus
Iaroslava Riurikovna of Kiev
Siemowit of Dobrzyń
Mieszko I Tanglefoot
Casimir I of Opole
Ludmila (of Bohemia?)
Euphrosyne of Opole
?
Viola
?
