= Kunigunde of Bohemia =

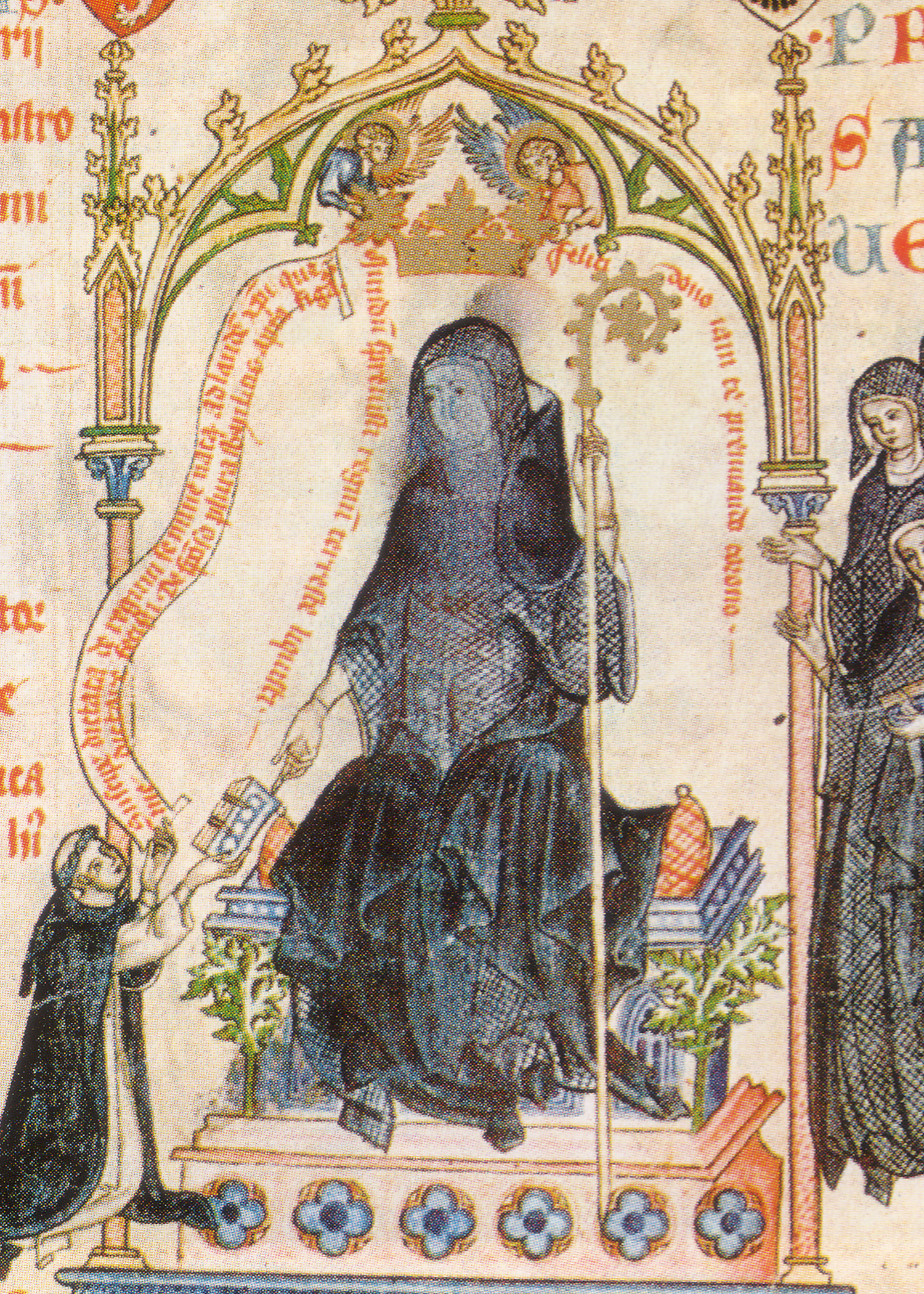
- Kunigunde in the Passional of Abbess Kunigunde

Duchess consort of Mazovia
- Tenure: 1291–1302
- Born: January 1265; Prague
- Died: 27 November 1321 (aged 56); St. George's Convent, Prague
- Burial: Prague
- Spouse: Boleslaus II of Masovia
- Issue: Wenceslaus of Płock; Euphrosyne, Duchess of Oświęcim; Bertha of Mazovia
- Dynasty: Přemyslid
- Father: Ottokar II of Bohemia
- Mother: Kunigunda of Slavonia

Kunigunde of Bohemia (January 1265 – 27 November 1321) was the eldest daughter of Ottokar II of Bohemia and his second wife, Kunigunda of Slavonia. She was a member of the Přemyslid dynasty. She was Princess of Masovia by her marriage to Boleslaus II of Masovia and later became abbess of the St. George's Convent at Prague Castle.

== Family ==
Kunigunde was the second of four children born to her father from his second marriage. Ottokar had been married to Margaret, Duchess of Austria, but had had no children from this marriage.

== Life ==
Kunigunde was first betrothed to Hartmann of Germany in 1277, a son of Rudolf I of Germany and his first wife Gertrude of Hohenberg. The marriage was intended to create peace between Germany and Bohemia. However, the engagement ended within a year. Despite this, Kunigunde's brother, Wenceslaus married Hertmann's sister, Judith of Habsburg in 1285. Kunigunde's sister Agnes followed suit and married Rudolf II, Duke of Austria, brother of Hartmann.

With no other proposals of marriage, Kunigunde took the veil at the Order of Poor Ladies in Prague, where she remained for a couple of years until her brother King Wenceslaus ordered her to marry Boleslaus II of Masovia.

=== Marriage ===
Upon the death of Leszek II the Black in Poland, Wenceslaus had claimed the throne. Although, this was a controversial move and caused civil war. A substantial amount of Polish nobles and citizens wished for Władysław I the Elbow-high to become King of Poland. Wenceslaus needed help to keep Poland so he decided to marry Kunigunde off to Boleslaus which would create a firm alliance with a powerful Polish noble.

Kunigunde married Boleslaus in 1291 as his second wife; his first wife Sophia of Lithuania had died in 1288. From this first marriage, Boleslaus had three children: Bolesław, Siemowit II and Anna.

The marriage had left Wenceslaus in a more comfortable position. During Władysław's siege on Sieradz, Wenceslaus and Boleslaus fought together against him.

Boleslaw and Kunigunde had two children:

1. Wenceslaus of Płock (ca. 1293 - 1336), became Duke of Plock
2. Euphrosyne (b. ca. 1292 - d. 26 December 1328/29), married Władysław of Oświęcim and had issue

Despite being brothers-in-law, the alliance between Wenceslaus and Boleslaw did not last. Boleslaw's brother Konrad had died without surviving children, he left some of his lands to his younger brother but the rest went to King Wenceslaus, much to Boleslaw's chagrin. In retaliation, Boleslaw withdrew his support for Wenceslaus' rule in Poland and sent Kunigunde back to Prague. The couple were divorced in 1302.

=== Later life ===
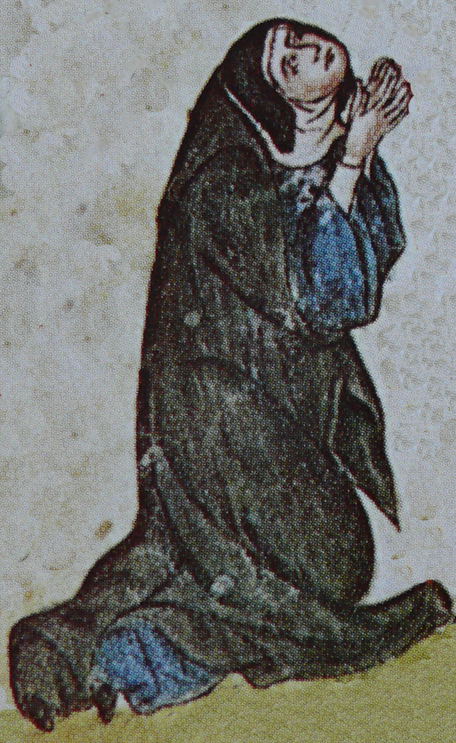
Kunigunde as a nun

When Kunigunde returned to Prague she returned to her religious life. She joined the Monastery of St. George, later becoming abbess. During this period, Kunigunde commissioned a luxurious illuminated manuscript, which is known today as the Passional of Abbess Kunigunde.

Wencelaus had died in 1305 and his own son, Wenceslaus III of Bohemia became King of Bohemia and Poland. Wenceslaus II had married Elizabeth Richeza of Poland after the death of Judith of Habsburg, to create an alliance with some Polish nobles, remedying the loss of Boleslaw's support. Whilst on campaign in Poland, the sixteen-year-old Wenceslaus III was assassinated. Władysław I the Elbow-high became King of Poland (crowned in 1320).

Kunigunde fostered her niece, the orphaned Elizabeth of Bohemia, who went to live with her in the Monastery of St. George. Kunigunde acted as a big influence in Elisabeth's life, though the princess moved out of the Monastery to live with her elder sister, Anna, Elisabeth Richeza and Wenceslaus III's widow Viola Elisabeth of Cieszyn.

On 20 April 1313, Boleslaw died and divided his estate amongst his three sons. Kunigunde's son, Wenceslaus received the County of Płock.

Elisabeth of Bohemia went on to marry John of Luxembourg and became Queen of Bohemia.

Kunigunde died on 27 November 1321 at the age of fifty-six, she was outlived by her two children.

Despite her complications with Poland during her lifetime, Kunigunde's great-granddaughter Jadwiga went onto marry Casimir III of Poland.

== Ancestry ==
Ancestors of Kunigunde of Bohemia

16. Vladislaus II of Bohemia
8. Ottokar I of Bohemia
17. Judith of Thuringia
4. Wenceslaus I of Bohemia
18. Béla III of Hungary
9. Constance of Hungary
19. Agnes of Antioch
2. Ottokar II of Bohemia
20. Frederick I, Holy Roman Emperor
10. Philip, King of the Romans
21. Beatrice I, Countess of Burgundy
5. Kunigunde of Hohenstaufen
22. Isaac II Angelos
11. Irene Angelina
23. Unknown Palaiologina?, afterwards Irene
1. Kunigunde of Bohemia
24. Vsevolod IV of Kiev
12. Michael of Chernigov
25. Anastasia of Poland
6. Rostislav of Slavonia
26. Roman the Great, Grand Prince of Kiev
13. Maria of Halych
27. Predslava Ryurikovna
3. Kunigunda of Slavonia
28. Andrew II of Hungary
14. Béla IV of Hungary
29. Gertrude of Merania
7. Anna of Hungary
30. Theodore I Laskaris
15. Maria Laskarina
31. Anna Komnene Angelina
