= Leszek of Dobrzyń =

Polish prince

- Born: 1302
- Died: July 10, 1316 (aged 13–14)
- Known for: Member of the House of Piast

Leszek of Dobrzyń (pl: Leszek dobrzyński; bef. 1302 – bef. 10 July 1316), was a Polish prince member of the House of Piast and Duke of Dobrzyń during 1312–1316 with his brothers.

He was the eldest son of Siemowit of Dobrzyń and Anastasia Lvovna of Halych–Volhynia.

== Life ==
The only known fact about him was his mention in the testimony of Jan of Kisielew during the Polish-Teutonic trial in Warsaw in 1339; because this is the only contemporary source who named him, his existence is a matter of dispute between historians. If he was a real person, certainly died young, in or before 1316, still under the regency of his mother and uncle Władysław I.
