= Władysław the Hunchback =

Polish prince (1303/5 – 1351/2)

Władysław the Hunchback (Polish: Władysław Garbaty; c. 1303/05 – 5 June 1351 or April 1352), was a Polish prince, member of the House of Piast. He was Duke of Dobrzyń during 1312-1327 (until 1316 under the regency of his mother and uncle) and again since 1343, and Duke of Łęczyca from 1327.

He was the second or first son of Siemowit of Dobrzyń and Anastasia Lvovna of Halych–Volhynia.

== Life ==
In 1316 Władysław entered into an agreement with Florian, Bishop of Płock concerning with the payment of tithes, and in this way the excommunication imposed to him and his family since 1310 was removed. After he began his independent rule, he was a faithful supporter of his uncle and former regent Władysław I the Elbow-high, to whom he recognized as his overlord.

During all his reign, Władysław (and his brother and co-ruler Bolesław) tried to pursue a friendly policy with the Church; on 24 June 1323 they founded (jointly with their mother) a hospital for the Order of the Holy Sepulchre at Rypin and in 1332 they granted several villages including Lodza (who since 1423 was named Łódź) in perpetual possession to the Kujawy Bishops.

In 1327/28, thanks to the threats of the Teutonic Order, the Polish King proposed to Władysław and Bolesław the exchange of their ancestral domain Dobrzyń for Łęczyca. This agreement was formalized on 1 October 1327.

After the death of his brother Bolesław ca. 1328, Władysław ruled alone. In 1343, as a result of the Treaty of Kalisz, Władysław recovered Dobrzyń (although probably this was a part of the 1327/28 exchange treaty). In addition, he could kept the district of Łęczyca during his lifetime.

Around 1343, Władysław married with Anna (d. ca. September 1349), whose origins are unknown. They had no children.

Władysław died between 1351 and 1352. Because he was childless, his districts of Dobrzyń and Łęczyca were merged to the Polish Kingdom.
