= Anastasia Lvovna of Halych–Volhynia =

Anastasia Lvovna of Halych–Volhynia (Ukrainian: Анастасія Львівна) (?-1335), was a Duchess of Dobrzyń by marriage to Siemowit of Dobrzyń (r. 1288–1293, 1295–1303 and 1305–1312). She served as Regent of Dobrzyń with her brother-in-law Władysław I Łokietek during the minority of her sons, Władysław the Hunchback and Bolesław of Dobrzyń between 1312 and 1316.

== Issue ==
- Leszek (bef. 1302 - bef. 10 July 1316).
- Władysław (bef. 1303 - 5 June 1351/April 1352).
- Casimir (bef. 1304 - bef. 10 July 1316).
- Bolesław (bef. 1305 - 1 October 1327/12 March 1329).
- Judith (d. aft. 24 September 1313).
