= Siemowit II of Masovia =

Polish duke (1283–1345)

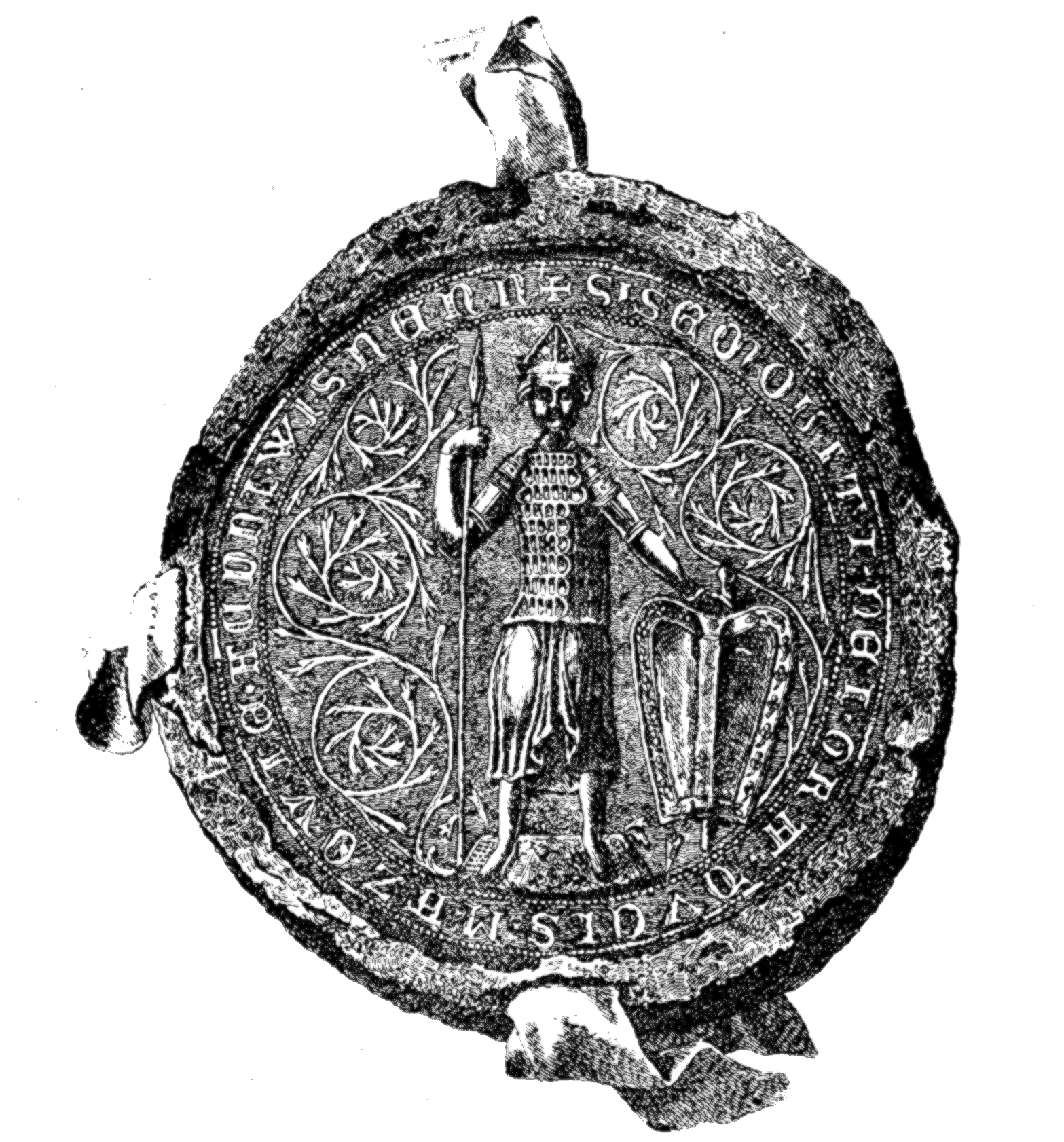
Siemowit II's Seal, ca. 1345

Siemowit II of Rawa (pl: Siemowit II rawski; 1283 – 18 February 1345), was a Polish prince member of the House of Piast, Duke of Warsaw and Liw during 1310–1313, after a new division with his brothers since 1313 ruler over Rawa Mazowiecka, Sochaczew, Zakroczym, Gostynin, Ciechanów and Wizna, regent of Płock during 1336–1340.

He was the eldest son of Bolesław II of Płock and his first wife Gaudemantė (Sophia), the daughter of Grand Duke Traidenis of Lithuania. He was probably named after his paternal grandfather, Siemowit I.

== Life ==
=== Beginning of his rule ===
Before his father died, in 1310 Siemowit II received the districts of Warsaw and Liw. When Bolesław II died in 1313, the Duchy of Masovia was divided. As the oldest son, Siemowit II obtained the central part of Masovia, with Rawa Mazowiecka as his capital. His younger brothers Trojden I and Wenceslaus were respectively given Czersk and Płock. This division didn't satisfy anybody and lead to a brief war between the three brothers in 1316. Apart from a brief mention in the Roczniku miechowskim, the exact details of this conflict are unknown.

=== Between Władysław I the Elbow-high and the Teutonic Order ===
In terms of foreign policy, Siemowit II tried to skillfully maneuver between his powerful neighbors: Władysław I the Elbow-high, the Teutonic Order, Lithuania and Bohemia. This policy was expressed, inter alia, in frequent changes of alliances.

Initially Siemowit II, along with his brothers, relied on Władysław I the Elbow-high, with whom in 1323 placed in the throne of Halych his nephew Bolesław Jerzy II (son of Trojden I). The continuation of this collaboration was further showed two years later (1325) when the Masovian Dukes participated in Władysław I's coalition against Brandenburg.

In 1325 Siemowit II and Trojden I send a letter to the Pope determined the eastern border of their possession as reaching two miles from Grodno (Oppidi quod dictur Grodno, ... a terrarum nostrorum ad duas lencas posit). Later in that year, their youngest brother Wenceslaus concluded an alliance with the Teutonic Order; therefore, Władysław I attacked and plundered Płock; however this attack and destruction to a part of Masovia didn't bring the expected success: Siemowit II and his brothers, felt threatened by this action, decided to conclude an alliance with the Teutonic Knights on 2 January 1326 in the city of Brodnica, under which the Grand Master guaranteed the Masovian Dukes their independence and the integrity of their domains. Moreover, the conflict created a permanent bond between the Masovian Dukes and the enemies of Władysław I - the Teutonic Knights and the Kingdom of Bohemia, and also bring another attack of the Polish King to the Duchy of Płock ub 1327 and the invasion of the Lithuanians to the domains of Siemowit II.

In 1329 Siemowit II and his brothers unexpectedly decided to support Władysław I and taken part in Kujawy in the war against the Teutonic Knights. A year later Siemowit II managed to obtain the neutrality. This move was in detriment of the youngest of the brothers, Wenceslaus of Płock, in after another invasion of his Duchy was forced to pay homage to King John of Bohemia, and therefore Siemowit II and Trojden I, in fear of suffering the fate as their brother, during the later stages of the conflict decided to remain neutral.

In 1333 The Teutonic Order (in order to obtain the alliance of the Masovian rulers) offered Siemowit II the district Brześć Kujawski, they took it to Poland in exchange for a new alliance; however, he declined the offer definitely took the side of Władysław I the Elbow-high.

The conclusion of "eternal" peace between Poland and the Teutonic Order (signed in the Treaty of Kalisz on 8 July 1343) relieved Siemowit II, whose Duchy had an uncomfortable situation between the two powers. As a potential successor Casimir III the Great on the throne of Poland, he also issued a document under which he agreed to waive the rights of Chełmno and Eastern Pomerania.

Siemowit II died in Rawa on 19 February 1345 at his estate of Wiskitki near Sochaczew. He was buried in either Płock Cathedral (according to the reports of Jan Długosz) or in the Dominican monastery of Warka (now destroyed; according to the Najstarszym opisie Mazowsza). He never married or had offspring, so after his death his duchy was divided among his three surviving nephews: Bolesław III, Siemowit III and Casimir I.

Preceded by Bolesław II	Duke of Masovia; 1310–1345	Succeeded by Casimir I
