= Bolesław II of Masovia =

Duke of Masovia

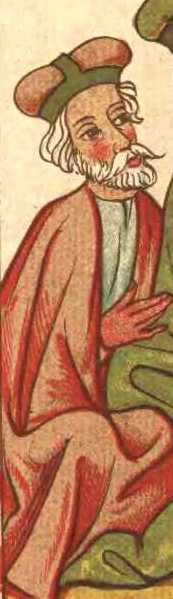
- Born: ca. 1253/58
- Died: 20 April 1313
- Noble family: House of Piast
- Spouses: Gaudemantė Sophia of Lithuania m. 1279 - wid. 1288; Kunigunde of Bohemia m. 1291 - div. 1302
- Issue: Siemowit II; Trojden I, Duke of Masovia; Anna [?] Euphrosyne; Wenceslaus
- Father: Siemowit I of Masovia
- Mother: Pereyaslava of Galicia

Bolesław II of Masovia or Bolesław II of Płock (pl: Bolesław II mazowiecki (płocki); ca. 1253/58 – 20 April 1313), was a Polish prince, member of the House of Piast, Duke of Masovia during 1262-1275 jointly with his brother, after 1275 sole ruler over Płock, after 1294 ruler over all Masovia and Duke of Kraków and Sandomierz during 1288-1289. In 1310 he gave to his sons the districts of Warsaw and Czersk. Also High duke of Poland twice (1288, 1289).

== Life ==
=== Early years ===
He was younger son of Siemowit I of Masovia and Pereyaslava, a Rus' princess, who was according to some historians a daughter of Prince Daniel of Halych or according to others his distant relative. He was born around 1253-1258.

Nothing is known from Bolesław II's first years, except that in 1262 he wasn't with his father and older brother Konrad II during the siege and battle of Jazdów, where Siemowit I was killed and Konrad II was captured by the Lithuanians. Because Bolesław II was too young to rule by himself, the regency was exercised by his mother Pereyaslava and his late father's ally, Bolesław the Pious, Duke of Greater Poland, until 1264, when his brother Konrad II was liberated and returned to assume the government.

=== Duke of Płock ===
When Bolesław II attained his majority in 1275, he demanded from his brother his part over their paternal inheritance. As a result, he received the western part of Masovia, with his capital in Płock. However he was not satisfied with this distribution, evidenced in his long-standing conflict with Konrad II; during this fight, Bolesław II did not hesitate to ask for the help from the murderers of his father, the Lithuanians. The alliance between Bolesław II and Lithuania was strengthened in 1279 when he married Gaudemantė, the daughter of Grand Duke Traidenis, who in her baptism took the name of Sophia.

Another ally of Bolesław II was his cousin Władysław I the Elbow-high, who was then Duke of Kujawy. The war between Bolesław II and Konrad during the second half of the 1270s and the first half of the 1280s didn't benefit any party, only causing destruction in extended parts of Masovia.

=== Death of Leszek II the Black. Fighting for Kraków and Sandomierz ===
On 30 September 1288 Leszek II the Black died childless. Part of the local nobility, led by Paweł of Przemankowo, Bishop of Kraków and the Topór family supported the succession of Bolesław II.

However, he wasn't the only candidate for the Seniorate. Henryk IV Probus, Duke of Wrocław, also advanced his claims. At first, it seemed that Bolesław II was able to master Lesser Poland without obstacles, as his troops in 1288 captured Kraków and Sandomierz. However, later in the same year he was expelled from Kraków by the troops of Henryk IV Probus, who gained the decisive favor of the castellan Sulk the Bear (pl: Sułk z Niedźwiedzia), who opened the gates of Wawel Castle to him. After this victory, Henryk IV Probus returned to Wrocław, and Bolesław II managed to say in Sandomierz. In early February 1289 a coalition of Piast princes (Henry III of Głogów, Przemko of Ścinawa and Bolko I of Opole) organized an expedition to Kraków with the purpose of consolidating the rule of Henryk IV Probus. At the sime time Bolesław II, who still wanted to recover Kraków, organized a coalition with Władysław I the Elbow-high and Casimir II of Łęczyca, Unexpectedly, he also received the support of his brother Konrad II and Kievan Rus' troops. In this way, Bolesław II was able to organized a powerful army with the main objective of reconquering the Seniorate. The army of Henryk IV Probus withdrew from Kraków, and on 26 February the bloody Battle of Siewierz took place, which ended with the defeat of Henryk IV's allies; during the fight, was killed Przemko of Ścinawa and Bolko I of Opole was captured. After the battle, Bolesław II occupied Kraków, where he triumphantly entered in the summer of 1289. Shortly after, he gave Sandomierz to his brother Konrad II as they had previously accorded in exchange of his military support. This action caused outrage among the Lesser Poland nobility (accustomed to see the Duke of Kraków reign over Sandomierz), who utterly refused to recognize Bolesław II as their ruler, and proclaimed Władysław I the Elbow-high as the new Duke of Kraków. For unknown reasons, Bolesław II refused to fight and retreated to his domains in Płock, and in August 1289 Władysław I the Elbow-high was in turn expelled by Henryk IV Probus, who became in the new ruler over Kraków and Sandomierz.

The only positive aspect of this struggle for the throne of Kraków was the reconciliation with his brother Konrad II.

=== Unification of Masovia; last years ===
Bolesław II's wife Sophia died in 1288. His second marriage was, like the first one, contracted for political reasons. The chosen bride was Princess Kunigunde, sister of King Wenceslaus II of Bohemia; the wedding took place in the first half of 1291. Thanks to this union, the Bohemian King neutralized the claims of the Duke of Płock over the Seniorate, especially when he was able to conquer Kraków in 1291. Bolesław II also wanted to strengthen his position with Wenceslaus II, so he didn't hesitate when in 1292 he helped his brother-in-law in his war against Władysław I the Elbow-high.

The alliance between Masovia and Bohemia did not last very long. In 1294 Konrad II died without male offspring, so Bolesław II became the sole ruler over all Masovia. Feeling stronger, he broke relations with the Kingdom of Bohemia and reestablished relations with Władysław I the Elbow-high.

In 1295 Przemysł II became King of Poland. The following year, after his assassination, Bolesław II supported Władysław I in his brief war against Henry III of Głogów for the succession in Greater Poland.

The hostile policy towards the Kingdom of Bohemia forced Wenceslaus II to launch an attack against Masovia. Despite the siege and destruction of Płock, Bolesław II didn't change his political course, evidenced by his refusal to recognize Wenceslaus II as King of Poland in 1300 and the repudiation of his wife Kunigunde, who was sent back to Prague in 1302.

In the early 1300s Bolesław II founded the stronghold of Warsaw, contributing to its development in detriment of the nearby Czersk.

After 1305 Bolesław II was not present in any more political activity. The next information about him took place in 1310, when he granted two separate districts to his eldest two sons: Siemowit II received Warsaw and Trojden I received Czersk. In 1311, Borzysław becomes his Chancellor.

Bolesław II died on 20 April 1313 in Wyszogród and was buried at Płock Cathedral.

== Marriages and Issue ==
In 1279 Bolesław II married firstly to Gaudemantė (baptized as Sophia; d. 1288), a daughter of Grand Duke Traidenis of Lithuania. They had three children:

1. Siemowit II (1283 - 18 February 1345).
2. Trojden I (1284/86 - 13 March 1341).
3. A daughter [Anna?] (ca. 1288 - aft. 1329), married after 13 August 1325 to Władysław of Legnica (div. before 13 Jan 1329).

In 1291 Bolesław II married secondly to Kunigunde (January 1265 - 27 November 1321), a daughter of Ottokar II and sister of Wenceslaus II, Kings of Bohemia; in 1302 Boleslaw and Kunigunde were divorced and she was sent back to Prague, where she became a nun. They had two children:

1. Euphrosyne (1292/94 – aft. 26 December 1327), married ca. 1304/09 to Władysław of Oświęcim.
2. Wenceslaus (1293/97 – 23 May 1336).

Bolesław II of Masovia House of Piast Born: ca. 1253/58 Died: 20 April 1313
Preceded by Konrad II of Masovia	Duke of Masovia; 1294–1313	Succeeded by Siemowit II and Trojden I
