= Trojden I of Masovia =

Duke of Masovia

Trojden I
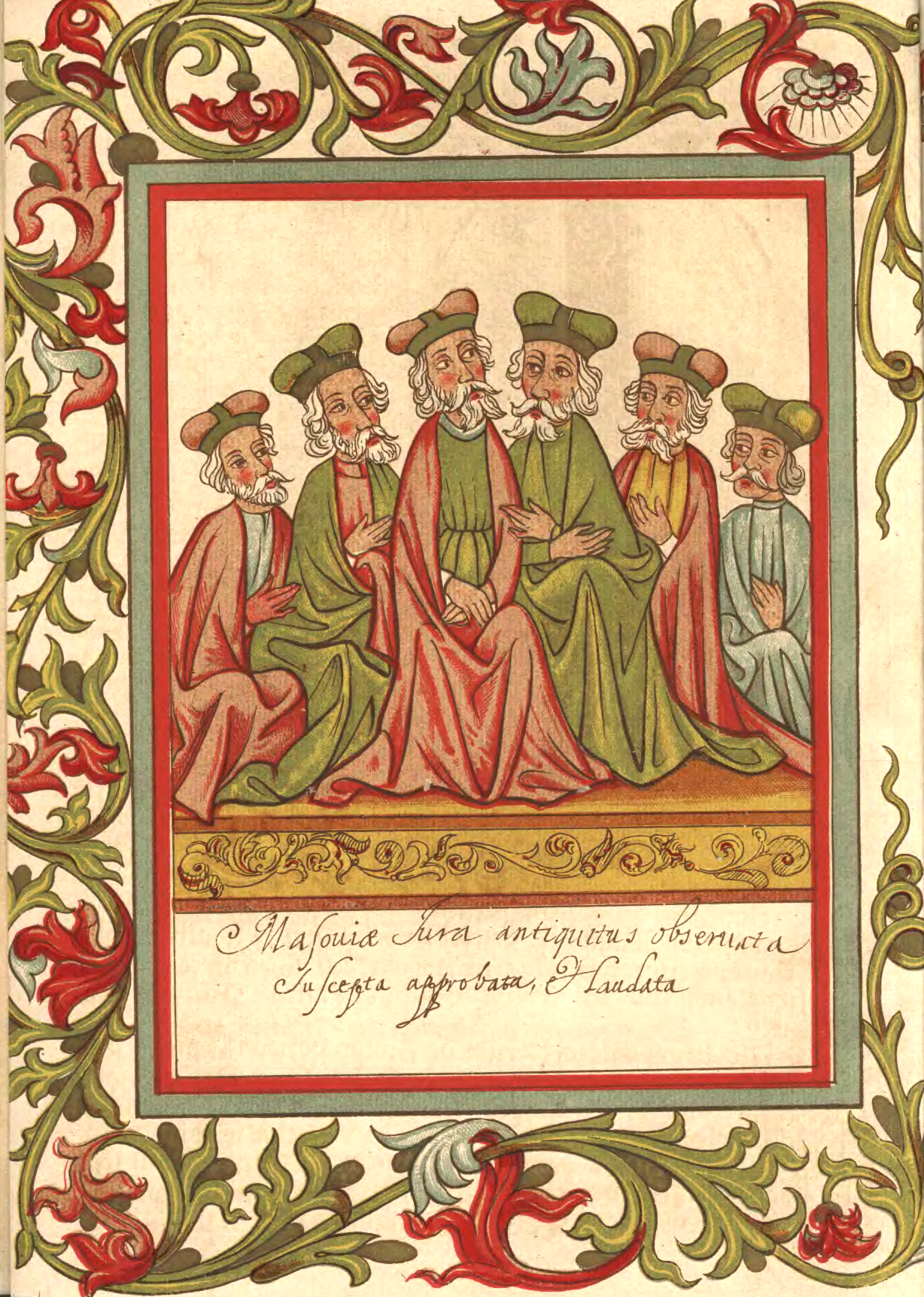
- Dukes of Masovia, c. 1450, Trojden I is second from left.
- Born: 1284/1286
- Died: 13 March 1341
- Noble family: House of Piast
- Spouses: Maria of Galicia m. 1309/1310 - wid. 1341
- Issue: Bolesław (Yuri II); Euphemia; Siemowit III; Casimir I
- Father: Bolesław II of Płock
- Mother: Gaudemantė (Sophia) of Lithuania

Trojden I (1284/1286 – 13 March 1341) was a Polish prince, Duke of Czersk from 1310, ruler over Warsaw and Liw from 1313, and regent of Płock in the years 1336–1340. He was a member of the House of Piast.

Trojden was the second son of Bolesław II of Płock and his first wife Gaudemunda of Lithuania, the daughter of Grand Duke Traidenis of Lithuania. He was named after his maternal grandfather.

== Life ==
In 1310, Trojden I received the district region of Czersk when his father was still alive. Following his father's death in 1313, he further received the districts of Warsaw and Liw in addition to his duchy, which made him ruler over all of eastern Masovia. This division didn't satisfy all members of his family and led to a brief war between the three brothers (Trojden, Siemowit II and Wenceslaus) in 1316. The exact details of this conflict are unknown except for a brief mention in an annually published manuscript called the Rocznik miechowski.

Initially, Trojden I maintained excellent relations with Polish king Ladislaus the Short (also known as the "Elbow-high"). Thanks to the king's intervention, Trojden I was able to marry Maria, the daughter of Yuri I, King of Halych-Volhynia, in around 1309/1310. Thanks to this union, Trojden's children could legitimately claim the Kingdom of Ruthenia. In 1323, when the Rurikid dynasty in Ruthenia became extinct after the death of Andrew of Galicia, Trojden I was able to place on the throne his oldest son Bolesław, who assumed the name Yuri II (in honour of his maternal grandfather).

In 1325, Trojden I and Siemowit I sent a letter to the Pope outlining the eastern border of their possession as reaching two miles from Grodno (Oppidi quod dictur Grodno, ... a terrarum nostrorum ad duas lencas posit).

The aggressive policy pursued by king Ladislaus (who wanted to reunite all the territories of Poland and Masovia) were a threat for Trojden I and his brothers, especially when Ladislaus attacked and plundered the city of Płock as a punishment for the alliance of the youngest Masovian Duke, Wenceslaus with the Teutonic Order. On 2 January 1326, Trojden I and his brothers concluded an agreement with the Teutonic Order at Brodnica, which led to a short conflict with Poland and its ally Lithuania.

In the following years, Trojden I together with his brothers tried to maneuver between the Kingdom of Poland and the Teutonic Order. For instance, in 1329 the Dukes of Masovia supported Poland militarily, while in 1334 they already appeared as allies of the Grand Master of the Teutonic Order.

In 1339, Trojden I was once again in league with the Kingdom of Poland, ruled at the time by Casimir III the Great. Evidence of this was his testimony during the Polish-Teutonic trial for the seizure of land from the Piast dynasty. For unknown reasons, Trojden didn't personally attend the trial, but sent Chancellor Gunther as his representative.

In 1340, his eldest son Bolesław (Yuri II) was poisoned by his Ruthenian subjects. Trojden I waived his right to succeed his son in exchange for a large sum of money paid to him by Casimir III.

Trojden I died on 13 March 1341 and is buried in the Dominican monastery in Warka, now destroyed. In 1859, his remains were transferred to the Church of Our Lady of Carmel in Warka, thanks to the initiative of Piotr Wysocki, as manifestation of growing Polish nationalism.

== Marriage and issue ==
Around 1309/1310, Trojden I married Maria (bef. 1293 – 11 January 1341), daughter of Yuri I, King of Halych-Volhynia. They are traditionally said to have had four children:

1. Bolesław (Yuri II) (1310 – 21 March 1340), became King of Ruthenia;
2. Euphemia (1312 – ca. 11 January 1374), married Casimir I, Duke of Cieszyn;
3. Siemowit III (1316/1325 – 16 June 1381), Duke of Masovia

Casimir I (1329/1331 – 26 November/5 December 1355), traditionally was listed as a son of Trojden I, but according to a 2026 archaeogenetic study he is not his biological son.

Trojden I of Masovia House of Piast Born: 1284/1286 Died: 13 March 1341
Preceded by Bolesław II	Duke of Eastern Masovia; 1310 – 1341	Succeeded by Siemowit III
