= Wyszogród =

Town in Masovian Voivodeship, Poland

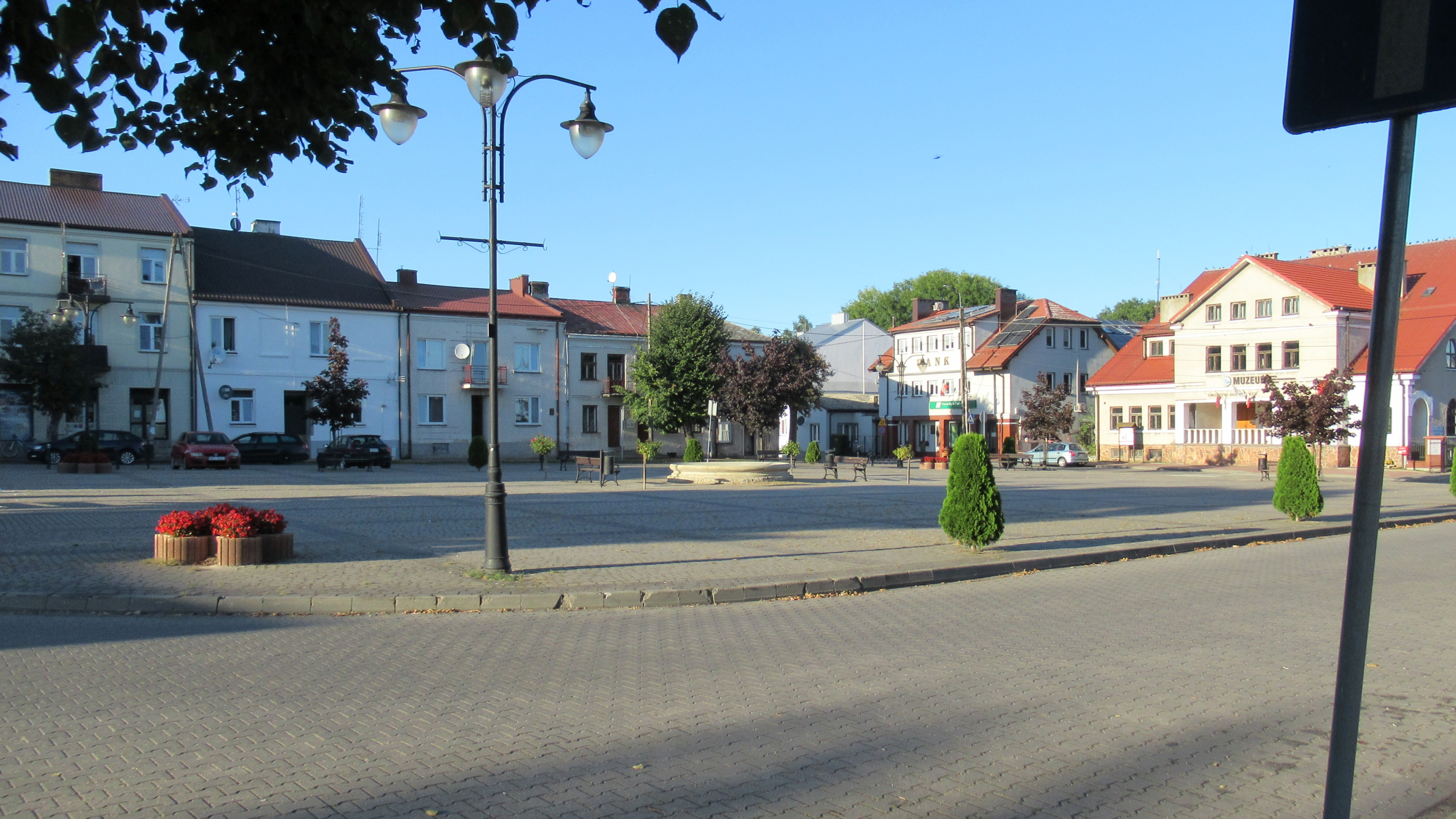
- Town center

- Coat of arms

- Location within Poland
- Coordinates: 52°23′N 20°12′E
- Country: Poland
- Voivodeship: Masovian Voivodeship
- County: Płock
- Gmina: Wyszogród
- Established: 7th century
- Town rights: 1398

Government
  - Mayor: Iwona Gortat

Area
  - Total: 12.96 km^{2} (5.00 sq mi)

Population (2021)
  - Total: 2,554
  - Density: 197.1/km^{2} (510.4/sq mi)
- Time zone: UTC+1 (CET)
  - Summer (DST): UTC+2 (CEST)
- Postal code: 09-450
- Area code: +48 24
- Car plates: WPL
- Website: http://www.wyszogrod.pl

Wyszogród [vɨˈʂɔɡrut] is a town in central Poland, in Masovian Voivodeship, in Płock County, by the Vistula River. The population of Wyszogród was 2,793 in 2004.

== History ==
=== Early history ===
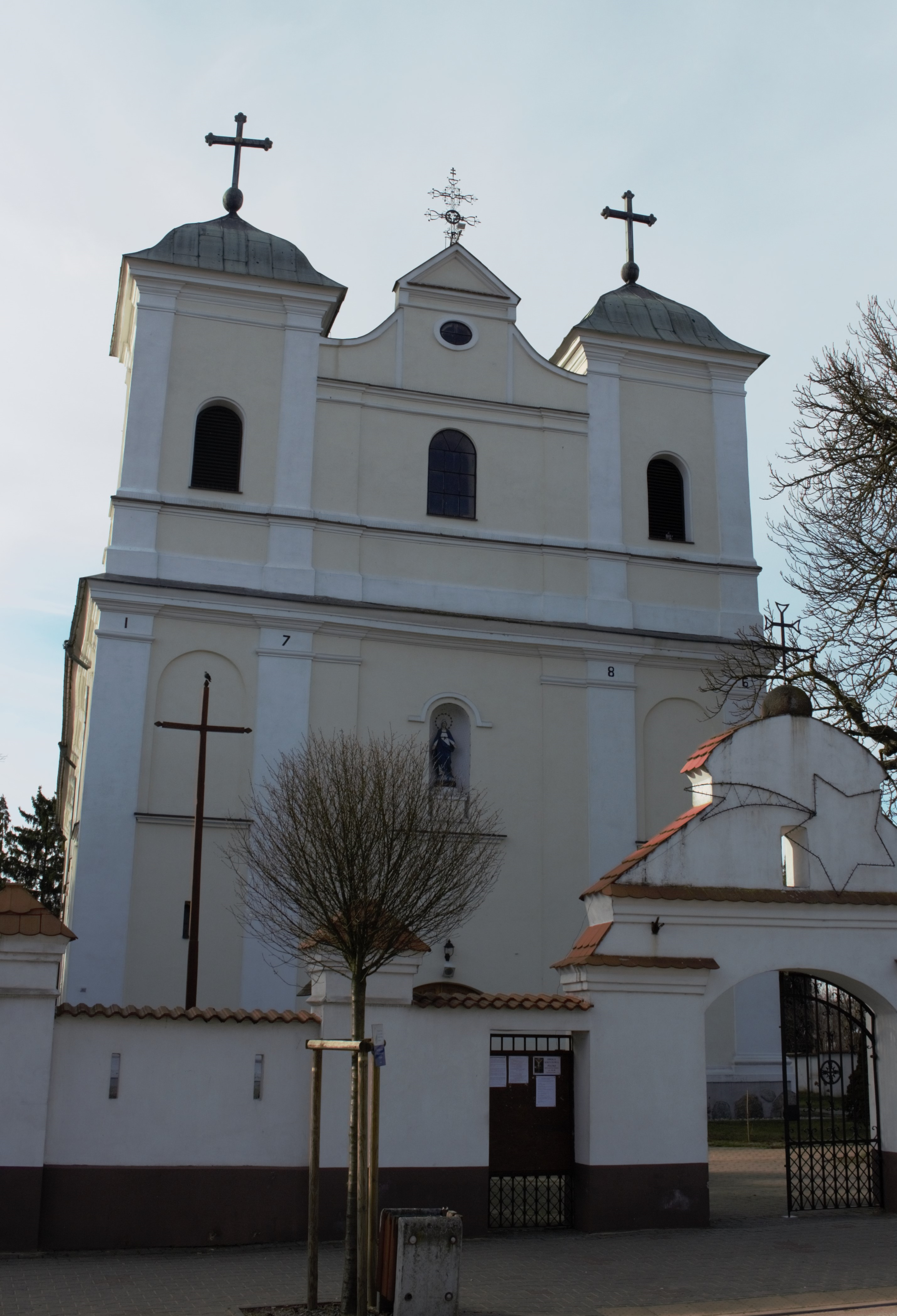
Baroque Holy Trinity church

The settlement dates back to the 7th century, when there was a Slavic pagan temple at the site. In the 11th century Wyszogród became fortified and started to act as a local centre of commerce. In the 12th century it became the seat of local castellany and soon it became one of the seats of the Dukes of Masovia within fragmented Piast-ruled Poland. Relocated on Magdeburg Law in 1398, Wyszogród became one of the most important inland ports and centres of textile production in the area. Brewing and crafts also developed. In the 16th century, King Sigismund II Augustus approved the statutes of the guilds of tailors and furriers, and Sigismund III Vasa issued new privileges for several guilds. Wyszogród was a royal town of Poland.

During the Deluge the town was pillaged and burnt by the Swedes. Several subsequent fires destroyed Wyszogród almost completely. During the Swedish invasion of Poland (1701–1706), Polish King Augustus II the Strong stayed in the town in 1704. After the Second Partition of Poland in 1793 it was annexed by Prussia. Prussia initiated German colonization and handed over the old Franciscan church to German Protestant colonists. The town also experienced an influx of Jews. In 1798 the Prussian administration dismantled the old castle of the Piast dynasty. In 1807 the town was reconquered by Poles and included within the short-lived Duchy of Warsaw and after the fall of Napoleon Bonaparte in 1815 it was transferred to so-called Congress Poland within the Russian Partition of Poland. During the January Uprising, on June 2, 1863, it was the site of a clash between Polish insurgents and Russian troops, won by the Poles.

=== 20th century ===
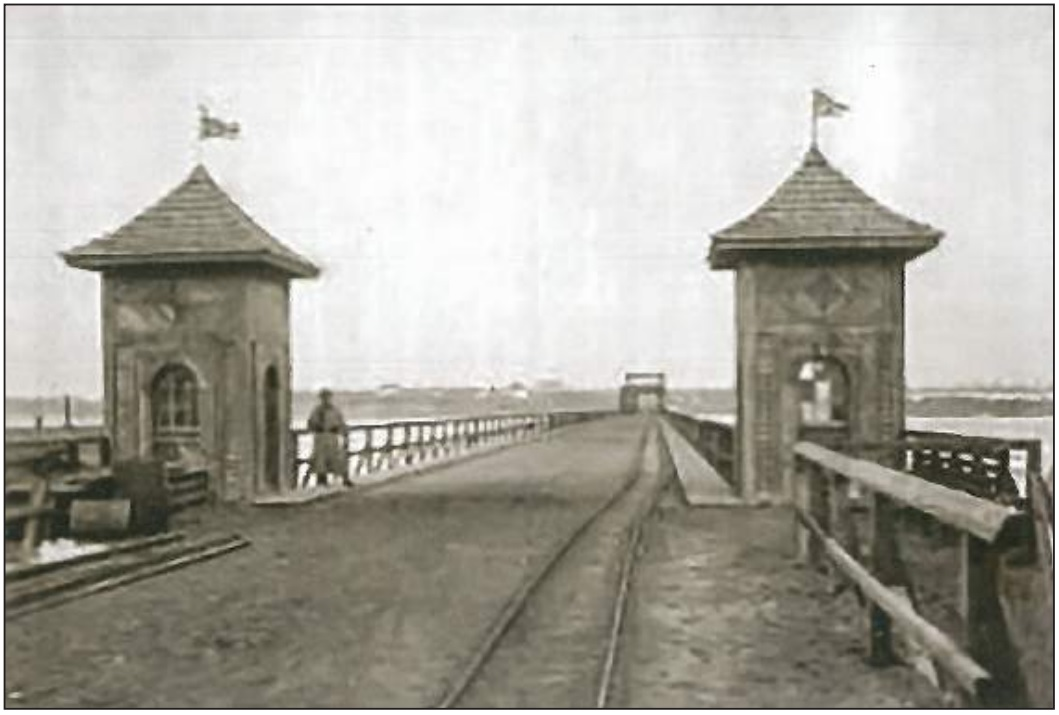
Bridge over the Vistula at Wyszogród in the 1910s

After World War I, Poland regained independence and control of the town. During the Polish–Soviet War, in August 1920, Polish troops were stationed nearby to defend the crossing over the Vistula River against a possible Soviet attack.

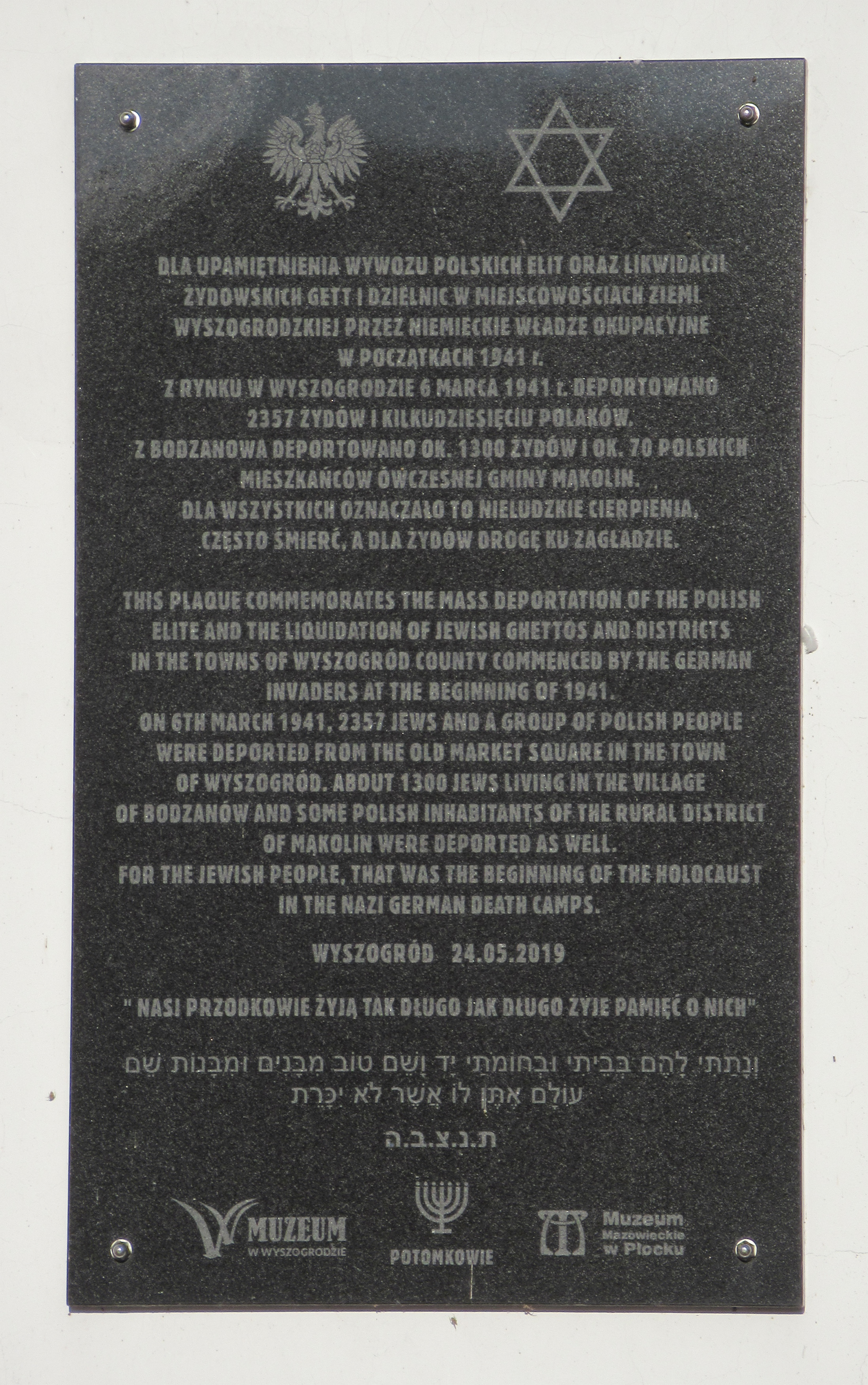
Memorial to local victims of German deportations during World War II

During World War II, the town was heavily damaged during the course of the German invasion of Poland in September 1939. During the German occupation, Poles and Jews were brutalized in the town and conscripted for forced labor. In March 1941, around 120 Poles were expelled from the town, temporarily deported to a camp in Działdowo, where they were stripped of money and valuables, and afterwards deported to the General Government, while their houses were handed over to German colonists as part of the Lebensraum policy. Beginning in March 1941, Jews were deported to other ghettos and then on to Treblinka where they were murdered in October 1941 and to Auschwitz, where most were murdered in November 1942. During these deportations and the time spent in other ghettos, they suffered unimaginable horrors along with starvation and disease. These experiences of the Holocaust resulted in the deaths of all but 250 of Wyszogrod's 2,700 Jews.

There were several Polish underground resistance groups operating both within the city and in the forests nearby. The town was rebuilt after the war, though its population did not recover to pre-war levels.

In 1997–1999 a bridge was built over the Vistula River, which was the longest bridge in Poland until the opening of the Solidarity Bridge in Płock in 2007.

== Sights ==
- Baroque Holy Trinity Church (1773–1786)
- Gothic-Baroque St. Mary of Angels Church (1408)
- Franciscan abbey (1684)
- Old Town market (18th and 19th centuries)
- Museum

== Transport ==
Polish National roads 50 and 62 run through the town.

== Sports ==
The local football club is Stegny Wyszogród. It competes in the lower leagues.
