= Wenceslaus of Płock =

Duke of Masovia

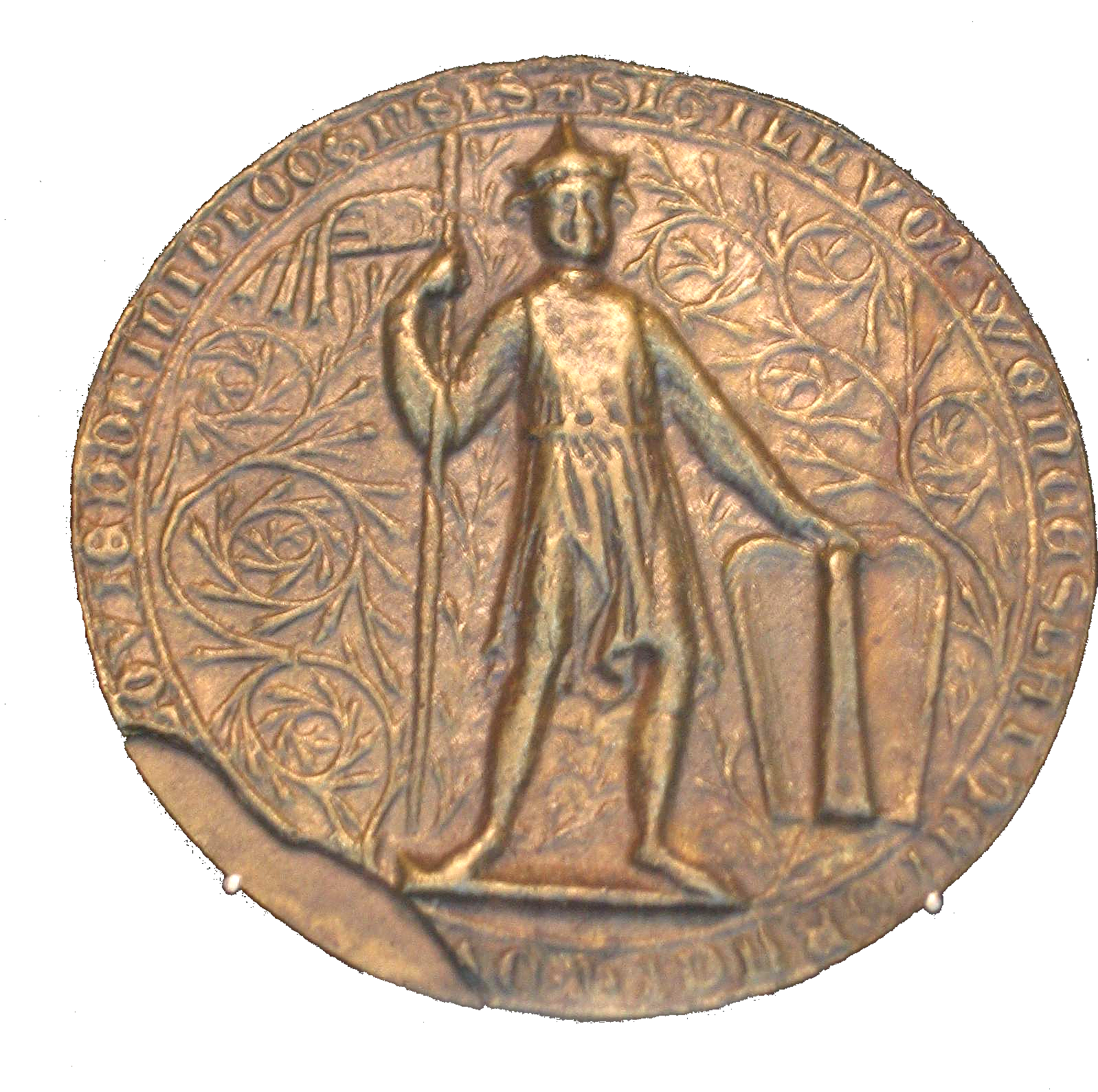
Seal of Wenceslaus of Płock.

Wenceslaus (Wańko) of Płock (Polish: Wacław płocki; 1293/97 – 23 May 1336), was a Polish prince member of the House of Piast, Duke of Płock from 1313 and vassal of Bohemia from 1329.

He was the third son of Bolesław II of Płock but the only born from his second marriage with Kunigunde, daughter of King Ottakar II of Bohemia. He was probably named after his maternal uncle, King Wenceslaus II of Bohemia.

== Life ==
Unlike his older half-brothers Siemowit II and Trojden I, Wenceslaus didn't receive his own district until the death of their father in 1313, when he inherited Płock. This division didn't satisfy anybody and lead to a brief war between the three brothers in 1316. Apart from a brief mention in the Roczniku miechowskim, the exact details of this conflict are unknown.

Early in his reign, Wenceslaus tried to pursue a neutral policy with his two powerful neighbors, the Teutonic Order and Poland; a clear manifestation of this was his refusal to testifying during the Teutonic-Polish trial in Inowrocław or the agreement that he signed on 14 April 1321 in the city of Golub with the Teutonic Knights (represented by Frederick von Wildenberg), by which the Masovian rulers committed to refuse passage to the Lithuanians troops who fight against help the Order. Despite the treaty with the Teutonic Order, initially Wenceslaus managed to maintain good relations with Lithuania, evidenced when in 1323 he allowed Lithuanian troops to cross his territory to invaded the district of Dobrzyń.

In 1325, Wenceslaus was obliged to renounce his policy of neutrality when Władysław I the Elbow-high launched a surprise attack against Płock. The reasons for this attack are unknown, but caused that on 2 January 1326 at Brodnica the dukes of Masovia concluded an alliance against Władysław I.

In 1326 the Polish–Teutonic War erupted. In this fight, Wenceslaus strongly supported the Teutonic Order; in revenge, Władysław I besieged and burned Płock; after Gostynin managed to resist the attack of the Polish forces, Wenceslaus asked the help of the Teutonic Order, and thanks to this, the Masovian rulers are able to rejected the army of Władysław I from their domains.

In 1329, Wenceslaus suddenly changed sides and allied with Władysław I. After this betrayal, an army led by King John of Bohemia and with the help of Teutonic Knights, invaded Płock, forcing Wenceslaus to surrender. On 29 March he was forced to paid homage to the Bohemian King, who was also a candidate for the throne of Poland. Wenceslaus' last years is known very little; probably discouraged by both the Polish and Teutonic Order, he withdrew from active politics.

Wenceslaus died on 23 May 1336 in Wyszogród, and was buried at Płock Cathedral (according to the reports of Jan Długosz).

== Marriage and issue ==
In 1316, Wencesalus married Dannila (baptized Elisabeth; ca. 1301/04 – 2 June 1364), a daughter of Gediminas, Grand Duke of Lithuania. They had two children:

1. Bolesław III (1322/30 – 20 August 1351).
2. Anna (1324 - 16 February 1363), married bef. 6 September 1337 to Henry V the Iron, Duke of Żagań.

Preceded by Bolesław II	Duke of Płock; 1313–1336	Succeeded by Bolesław III
