= Golden Bull of Rimini =

13th-century imperial decree issued by Emperor Frederick II

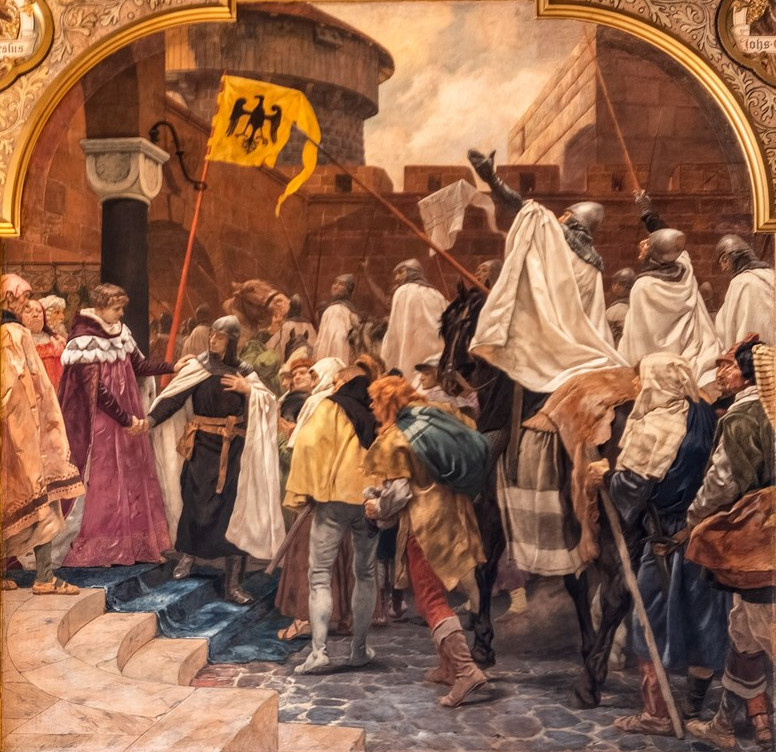

The Golden Bull of Rimini was a decree issued by Emperor Frederick II in Rimini in March 1226 that granted and confirmed the privilege of territorial conquest and acquisition for the Teutonic Order in Prussia. According to historian Tomasz Jasiński, the bull was backdated and had actually been issued in 1235. It represents the first of a series of three documents, that include the Treaty of Kruschwitz of 1230 and the Papal Golden Bull of Rieti of 1234.

== Background ==
The Piast duke Konrad I of Masovia had since 1209 engaged in several military campaigns against the pagan Old Prussians. In 1217 Pope Honorius III authorized bishop Christian of Oliva to designate these conquests as the Prussian Crusade. In 1222/23 Konrad attempted to subdue the Prussian territories of the Culmer Land east of the Vistula River. Backed by his Polish cousins Leszek I the White and Henry I the Bearded, he initially was successful, but was eventually confronted with relentless Prussian counter attacks and incursions across the borders into his Masovian lands. The military Order of Dobrzyń, founded by bishop Christian in 1225 (or 1228) lacked strength and numbers to successfully contain the Prussians and was soon destroyed. Prussian forces at last threatened the integrity of Konrad's Duchy, attacking his residence at Płock Castle. Konrad took up negotiations with the Teutonic Order in 1226 to have them join his forces and stabilize the situation.

The Teutonic Order, under the command of Grand Master Herman of Salza, had been on campaign in the Burzenland region of Transylvania since 1211. The Knights of the order had been called in by King Andrew II of Hungary to settle and stabilize the eastern Hungarian frontier and protect it against the Cumans. In 1225 King Andrew expelled the order after they had attempted to establish an autonomous monastic principality on Hungarian territory, subordinate only to the authority of Pope Honorius III. Now, von Salza would wait to only set out for Prussia, after the Order's claimed possessions were confirmed directly by the Holy Roman Emperor.

== The Bull ==
The Knights were to be supported by Duke Konrad I of Masovia in exchange for their conquest and subjugation of the heathen Prussian tribes:

...our trusty Brother Herman, the worthy Master of the Sacred House of the Hospital of St. Mary of the Germans in Jerusalem [i.e., the Teutonic Order] has explained ... that our devoted Konrad (Chünradus), Duke of Masovia and of Kujawy (Cuiaviae), has promised and undertaken to provide for him and to his brethren from that land, which is called the Chelmło Land (terra quae vocatur Culmen), and in that other land, that is to say, between his borderland (marchiam) and the territories of the Prussians (confinia Prutenorum), that they may thus indeed take up the task and readily embark upon the invasion and obtaining of the land of Prussia (terram Prusciae) for the honor and glory of the true God.

We [that is, Frederick himself] therefore... especially because the land itself is held under the sole rule of the Empire (sub monarchia imperii), trusting also in the judgment (prudentia) of the same Master, because he is a man mighty both in deed and word and through his own and his brethren's perseverance is mightily undertaking and manfully carrying out the conquest of that land... even though many, vainly besought with numerous exertions in this business, gave up (defecerunt) just when they seemed about to set forth, grant the land of Prussia to the same Master along with the forces of his order and with all those who think to invade [it]...

This Imperial authorisation was signed by a large number of princes, such as the Archbishops of Magdeburg, Ravenna, Tyre, Palermo and Reggio, the Bishops of Bologna, Rimini, Cesena, Mantua and Tortosa, the Dukes of Saxony and Spoleto, and the Margrave of Montferrat.

== Later confirmation ==
=== Treaty of Kruszwica ===
Duke Konrad actually had no intention of ceding the Chełmno Land and initially supported bishop Christian of Oliva establishing the Order of Dobrzyń (Fratres Militiae Christi). Konrad vested the few brethren with the Dobrzyń Land, who however, were not able to secure the borders of Masovia. The Teutonic Order would only join Konrad after receiving a ducal guarantee and the procurement of a papal bull. On 16 June 1230, the Treaty of Kruszwica was supposedly signed, according to which Duke Konrad ceded the lands of Chełmno as well as all other conquests in Prussia to the Teutonic Knights, represented by Grand Master Hermann von Salza. The Livonian Brothers of the Sword and the Order of Dobrzyń were incorporated into the Teutonic Order in 1237. The text of the document is only known by later references, as the original has not been preserved. According to the historian Max Perlbach (1848-1921), the Teutonic Order had in fact forged this document to strengthen the legal basis of their secular possessions.

=== Bull of Rieti ===
In 1234, Pope Gregory IX issued the Golden Bull of Rieti (Pietati proximum), that presents the written authorization of all previous verbal consent given in August and September 1230 after the Treaty of Kruszwica and confirms all prior agreements. It asserts the Teutonic Order's domination of the Chelmno land east of the lower Vistula River and of any other territory conquered by Teutonic Order in Prussia ("to eternal and absolute ownership"). These territories are not to become a fief of any other secular or ecclesiastical power. The Roman Curia had already announced that the Order is to answer exclusively to the papal sovereign, nevertheless, von Salza had insisted on written promulgation.

The bull was re-confirmed by Pope Alexander IV in 1257.

== See also ==
- Prussian Crusade

== Sources ==
- Bojtar, Endre (1999). Foreword to the Past: A Cultural History of the Baltic People. Central University Press.
- Corwin, Edward Henry Lewinski (1917). The Political History of Poland. The Polish Book Importing Company.
- Curta, Florin (2006). Southeastern Europe in the Middle Ages, 500–1250. Cambridge University Press. ISBN 978-0-521-89452-4.
- Kamp, N (1995). "Federico II di Svevia, imperatore, re di Sicilia e di Gerusalemme, re dei Romani". Dizionario Biografico degli Italiani (in Italian). Vol. 45. Treccani.
- Urban, William (2003). The Teutonic Knights: A Military History. Greenhill Books, London. ISBN 1-85367-535-0.
- Von Jeroshin, Nicolaus (2010). The Chronicle of Prussia by Nicolaus Von Jeroshin: A History of the Teutonic Knights in Prussia 1190-1331. Translated by Fischer, Mary. Ashgate.
