= Nawoja =

Nawoja is the Polish feminine name derived from the masculine name Nawoj. It is better known in its diminutive form Nawojka (pronounced: [naˈvɔi̯ka].

Notable persons with the name include:

- Olga Nawoja Tokarczuk, Polish writer and activist
- Nawojka, a semi-legendary medieval Polish woman known to have dressed as a boy in order to study at the University of Kraków in the 14th or 15th century
- The owner of a 15th-century libellus precum (manuscript prayer book) known as Nawojka's Prayerbook
- Nawojka Cieślińska-Lobkowicz, Polish art historian, director of the Museum of Art in Łódź (1996)
