= Bolesław I of Masovia =

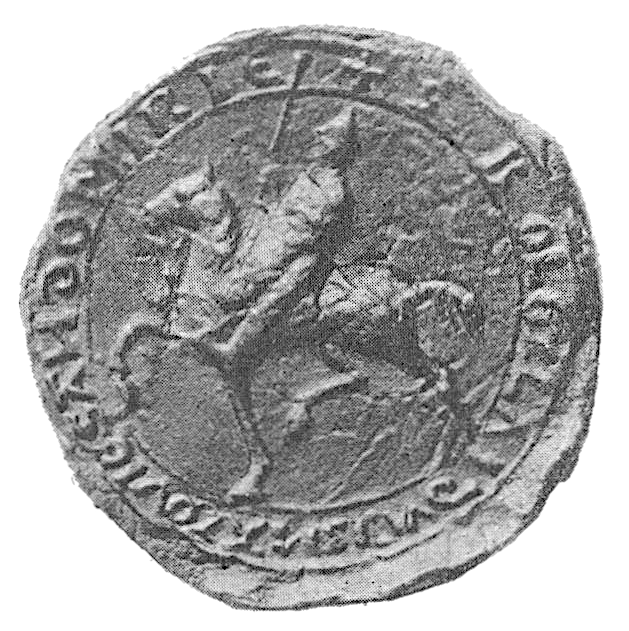
- Seal of Boleslaw I of Masovia
- Born: 1208
- Died: ca. 25 February 1248
- Noble family: Piast dynasty
- Spouses: Gertrude of Silesia; Anastasia Alexandrovna of Belz
- Father: Konrad I of Masovia
- Mother: Agafia of Rus

Bolesław I of Masovia (Polish: Bolesław I Mazowiecki; 1208 – ca. 25 February 1248), was a Polish prince, a member of the Polish House of Piast, Duke of Sandomierz (only a part) during 1229–1232, Duke of Dobrzyń during 1233–1247 and Duke over the whole Masovia during 1247–1248.

He was the second son of Konrad I of Masovia and Agafia of Rus. He was probably named after his great-grandfather, Bolesław III Wrymouth. The death of his older brother Przemysł, in 1228 left him as the eldest surviving child of his family.

== Life ==
From a young age, Bolesław I became part of the ambitious political projects of his father. In 1227, after the assassination of the High Duke of Poland Leszek I the White, he accompanied his father to Lesser Poland to participate in negotiations on the succession with his widow Grzymisława of Luck. In view of the failure of the talks, Bolesław I received from his father the stronghold of Dobrzyń nad Wisłą until 1229, when Konrad I finally forced Grzymisława to surrender to Bolesław I a part of the Duchy of Sandomierz, the district of Radom. Immediately, Bolesław gave Dobrzyń nad Wisłą to his youngest brother, Siemowit I of Masovia.

In 1231, Bolesław I became involved with his father and brothers in the installation of the Teutonic Knights in the region of Chełmno Land. At the same time, he supported his father in the war to conquer Kraków, after the death of Władysław III Spindleshanks in 1231. However, the quick intervention of Henry I the Bearded (High Duke of Poland from 1232 to 1238) and the invasion of Masovia by Prussians forced Konrad I to abandon his plans; in addition, Henry I was able to take control of the entire Duchy of Sandomierz.

To compensate for the loss of the Duchy of Sandomierz, Konrad I offered his son parts of Masovia, with the district of Sieradz as the capital. Nevertheless, Konrad I retained control of foreign policy and of the army.

In 1234, Boleslaw received the north of Masovia of the Vistula and Bug Rivers in exchange for the region of Sieradz (who was strategically most closer to Lesser Poland and thus being more important for his father in his fights for the throne of Kraków), while his other brother Casimir I of Kuyavia received Kujawy. This distribution of lands must be only temporary, because it was implicit that after the death of their father, the three surviving brothers (Bolesław I, Casimir I and Siemowit I) had to make a new equitable re-distribution of the lands.

In subsequent years, Bolesław I attacked his Prussian and Russian neighbors. He supported the Order of Dobrzyń and in 1238 he took part in the war against Daniel of Galicia and Mindaugas of Lithuania.

In 1241, after the death of his father-in-law Henry II the Pious at the Battle of Legnica, Bolesław I supported his father's military seizure of Kraków, which this time was able to conquer the Seniorate. His rule lasted only two years, until the Battle of Suchodoły on 25 May 1243, when Konrad I was defeated and forced to retire to Sieradz.

With the death of Konrad I on 31 August 1247, new horizons opened for Bolesław I. In his father's will, he received most of Masovia; shortly after, he had to face an attack by his brother Casimir I, because he was dissatisfied with his portion of their paternal inheritance. However, before the open war began, Bolesław I died unexpectedly during the spring of 1248 (probably around 25 February).

By 1232, Bolesław I married firstly with Gertrude (1218/1220 – 23/30 April 1244/1247), daughter of Henry II the Pious. They had no children.

Between 1245 and July 1247, Bolesław I married secondly to his first cousin once removed Anastasia, daughter of Alexander Vsevolodich, Prince of Bielsk (in turn a son of Vsevolod Mstislavich, Prince of Volhynia and Bielsk). They had no children. After her husband's death, she remarried a Hungarian magnate called Demetri, probably a member of the Aba family.

With no offspring from any of his marriages, in his will, Bolesław I bequeathed all his possessions to his younger brother Siemowit I. This however, annoyed Casimir I, and soon the war continued between the surviving brothers.

== Bibliography ==
- Bolesław I Mazowiecki (sandomierski) in: poczet.com [retrieved 15 February 2015].

Bolesław I of Masovia Piast dynasty Born: c. 1208 Died: 25 February 1248
Preceded by Bolesław V the Chaste	Duke of Sandomierz; 1229–1232	Succeeded by Bolesław V the Chaste
Preceded by Konrad I of Masovia	Duke of Masovia; 1247–1248	Succeeded by Siemowit I of Masovia
