= Battle of Drohiczyn (1238) =

Rus' victory over the Teutonic Knights

Date	March 1238
Location	Drohiczyn
Result	Rus' victory
Territorial changes	Galicia-Volhynia captures Drohiczyn

Belligerents
Principality of Galicia-Volhynia	Order of Dobrzyń

Commanders and leaders
Daniel of Galicia	Master Bruno (POW)

Strength
Unknown	200 Knights

Casualties and losses
Unknown	Entire force killed or captured

The Battle of Drohiczyn or Battle of Dorohychyn took place between the Teutonic Knights of the Order of Dobrzyń and Prince Daniel's Galicia-Volhynia over control of the castle, on March 1238.

== Prelude ==
The town of Drohiczyn was historically an important trade hub. Konard I controlled the town before transferring it to the knights of Order of Dobrzyń in 1237. How the castle came under Konrad I's control or when is still a subject of debate. Dobrzyń knights were tasked with "fighting Prussian heathens" and the growing crusader influence in the Baltics could also threaten the south-western lands of the Kievan Rus'.

== Battle ==
On March 1238, Prince Danylo was ready to recapture the castle. This castle was an important Eastern trade route and was prepared to employ trickery against the knights of the castle. In addition, Mongol troops were besiging Kozelsk which forced Danylo to take quick approach to unify his principality. Danylo managed to get the knights out of the castle where he had an advantage. The battle took place outside of the castle's walls, its course was determined by efficiency of Danylo's cavalry. As a result, all knights were either killed or captured. The Dobrzyń detachment likely didn't exceeded 200 knights, but this battle proven to be devastating to their existence. Some scientists believe Dobrzyń knights didn't hold much importance and were doomed to be gone eventually.

== Aftermath and legacy ==
For Daniel of Galicia, the capture of Drohiczyn allowed him to unify the Volyn principality and he later established relations with Konrad I of Masovia. Apart from now owning the castle, Danylo now eliminated the crusader threat to south-western Rus' lands. However, some historians reduce the significanсe of this battle to a border skirmish.

=== Soviet assessment ===
During 1937–1938, Soviet propaganda used Danylo's conflict with the Order of Dobrzyń to encourage militancy among Soviet population against German aggression in the East. On July 7, 1941, when Germany invaded the Soviet Union.

== Bibliography ==
- Чугуй, Тарас (2017). "The battle of Dorogychyn in the middle of the XIII century: pressing questions of historiography" (in Ukrainian). Харківський національний університет імені В. Н. Каразіна.
- Khrystan, Nazarii (2017). "DROHICZYN BATTLE: HISTORY ACADEMIC DISCIPLINE VERSUS POLITICS (THE SOVIET HISTORICAL THOUGHT OF 30-80'S OF THE 20TH CENTURY)" (PDF). Yuriy Fedkovych Chernivtsi National University.
