= Siemowit I of Masovia =

Siemowit I
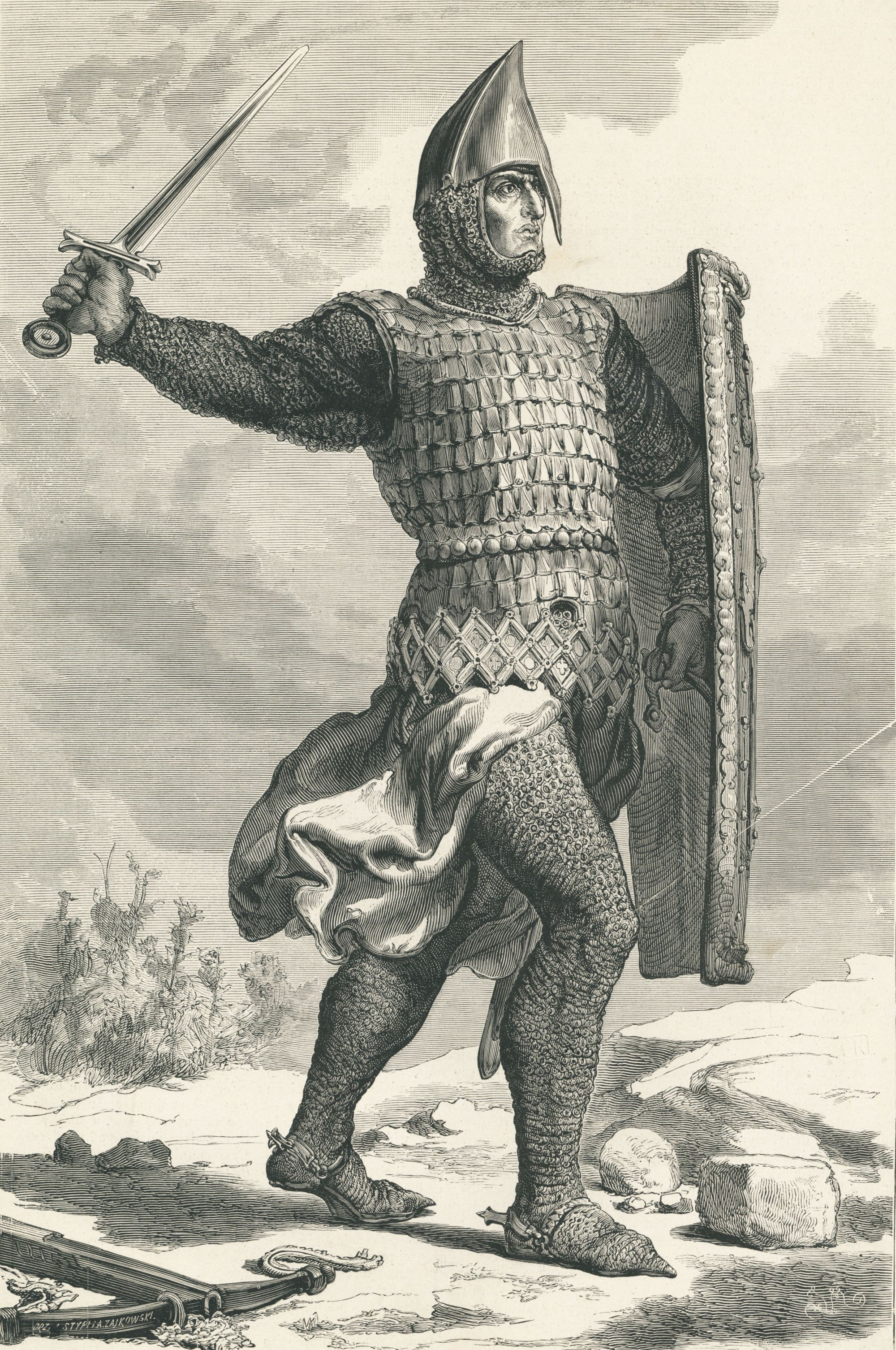
- Siemowit I, Duke of Masovia by Jan Matejko

Duke of Masovia
- Reign: 1248–1262
- Predecessor: Bolesław I of Masovia
- Successor: Konrad II of Masovia
- Born: c. 1215
- Died: 23 June 1262
- Spouse: Pereyaslava of Halych
- Issue: Konrad II of Masovia; Bolesław II of Masovia; Salomea
- House: House of Piast
- Father: Konrad I of Masovia
- Mother: Agafia of Rus

Siemowit I of Masovia (Polish: Siemowit (Ziemowit) I mazowiecki) (c.1215-23 June 1262), was a Polish prince member of the House of Piast, Duke of Czersk during 1247–1248, Duke of Masovia (except Dobrzyń) during 1248–1262, ruler over Sieradz during 1259–1260.

He was the sixth son of Konrad I of Masovia and his wife Agafia of Rus.

== Life ==
Siemowit appears clearly in documents only in 1239, when at the behest of his father, he probably killed the canon of Płock Jan Czapla; however, and despite his personal involvement in this matter, current historiography completely blames his father for his action.

Konrad I died on 31 August 1247, leaving the districts of Sieradz, Łęczyca and Czersk to his surviving sons. Using the confusion who followed this death, Siemowit I's older brother Casimir I managed to seize the greater part of their inheritance (Sieradz and Łęczyca); however, Siemowit I was able to keep Czersk thanks to the military support of his other older brother, Bolesław I.

Bolesław I died unexpectedly in early 1248, and under his will he gave all his domains to Siemowit I; after this, the latter avoided an open conflict with his brother Casimir I, accepting his rule over Sieradz-Łęczyca and focusing all his attention on the military conflicts in his frontiers with Kievan Rus', Yotvingia and the Teutonic Order.

Faced with the constant raids of Baltic tribes on his territory, Siemowit I made an alliance with Prince Daniel of Halych, who suffered the same problem; shortly after he married with Daniel's daughter Pereyaslava. In autumn 1248, Siemowit I, together with Daniel, his brother Vasilko and Bolesław V the Chaste (whose domains were also affected by the Baltic invasions), organized the first major military campaign against the Yotvingians. In the autumn of 1248, together with the Ruthenian army and the reinforcements of Prince Bolesław the Chaste, Siemowit took part in the armed conflict against Yotvingians. The gathering place of the invasion troops was Drohiczyn. After plundering the first settlement encountered, the Polish forces set fire to the buildings, thus thwarting the possibility of surprising the Yotvingians. This caused misunderstandings with the Ruthenians. During the expedition, the Polish-Ruthenian dispute grew and concerned the issue of command over the expedition. In the end, the Polish army surrendered to Daniel, which ended the conflict. The Yotvingians, making use of the difficult terrain conditions, used the tactic of harassing the enemy with violent attacks. Despite this, the Masovian-Ruthenian army managed to reach Wizna. However, the expedition was unsuccessful. Despite the devastation of large areas and the capture of many prisoners, the most important goal of the expedition, which was to subjugate this part of Yotvingia, was not achieved. Siemowit again set off against the Yotvingians in 1253, together with Daniel of Halych and his son, Leo I of Galicia. As during the first expedition, Drohiczyn was the gathering place of the troops. During the military operations, there were again disputes between Ruthenians and Poles. Despite this, the Ruthenians managed to achieve some successes. The Leo managed to break the units of the Yotvingian kunigas Stekint. For this reason, another Yotvingian commander, Komat, promised to recognize Daniel's supremacy. The Masovian - Ruthenian army reached the city of Raj, but after ravaging the surrounding areas, they turned back. Thus, Daniel's expedition did not achieve the expected success.

At the turn of 1255/1256, Siemowit I participated in a great expedition against the Yotvingians with the Ruthenian princes, as well as with the Lesser Poland knights from the principality of Bolesław the Chaste. The third expedition was the most successful and brought tangible benefits. The coalition troops went deep into the Yotvingian territory, destroying several cities in the process. Further hostilities prompted the kunigas to submit to Daniel's authority.

The Polish princes Siemowit and Bolesław gained benefits from this expedition. It seems that immediately after the battle, Siemowit collected tribute from pagan lands. Presumably no less than 1/6 of the total income that Daniel received from the territory of the Yotvingians.

The close collaboration between Siemowit I and the Teutonic Order (expressed, for example, in the defense that the Masovian ruler made for the Order before Pope Alexander IV, who accused them of cruelty in 1258), didn't produce the expected results. Siemowit I was still targeting the Baltic tribes, while the Teutonic Knights received their territorial conquests. Particularly dangerous proved to be the growth of Lithuania, who after the destruction of the Yotvingians became the direct neighbor of Siemowit I's domains.

Another problem that plagued Siemowit I's reign was the relationship with his brother Casimir I, who feared (perhaps not without reason) that the alliance with the Teutonic Knights might also be directed against him. So in December 1254, Casimir I captured his brother and held him prisoner when he returned from Kraków after the celebration of the canonization of Stanislaus of Szczepanów. Siemowit I and Pereyaslava were released the following year, following the intervention of Bolesław V the Chaste and others who promised to support Casimir I in his war against Swietopelk II, Duke of Pomerelia-Gdańsk.

The extremely aggressive policy pursued by Casimir I turned sour in 1259, when Bolesław the Pious, ally of Pomerania, set up a coalition against him with Boleslaw V the Shy, Siemowit I and Daniel of Halych. The victory allowed Siemowit I to recover the district of Sieradz; however, after the signing of the peace treaty at Przedbórz on 2 December 1260, Siemowit I was forced to give Sieradz to Casimir I's eldest son Leszek II the Black, and the Kujavian princes promised that they would never resolve their conflicts with wars.

In the meanwhile, Siemowit I faced more internal problems. In the spring of 1262 Lithuania and Kievan Rus', under the command of Mindaugas, launched a major offensive campaign against the Duchy of Mazovia. The Masovians were caught by surprise, the capital, Płock, fell since virtually without any defense. After this, Mindaugas crossed the Vistula river and captured the fortress of Jazdów. Siemowit I and his oldest son, Konrad II, who were in Jazdów on a visit, prepared for a long siege of the fortress (especially when they expected that soon their allies could came to rescue them), however, due to the betrayal of the townspeople, the troops managed to enter Jazdów (23 June 1262); in the confusion of the battle, Siemowit I was killed and his son was captured; according to one version, the Masovian Duke was executed by his own brother-in-law Shvarn.

During the captivity of Konrad II (which lasted two years), the regency of Siemowit I's domains was held by his ally Bolesław the Pious.

== Marriage and issue ==
By 1248, Siemowit I married with Pereyaslava (d. 12 April 1283), a daughter of Rurikid Prince Daniel of Halych. They had:

1. Konrad II (ca. 1250 – 23 June 1294)
2. Bolesław II (1253/58 – 20 April 1313)
3. Salomea (ca. 1262 – 1301), a nun.

== Sources ==
- Bruce-Boswell, Alexander (1957). "Poland, 1050-1303". In Tanner, J.R.; Previte-Orton, C.W.; Brooke, Z.N. (eds.). The Cambridge Medieval History: Victory of the Papacy. Vol. 6. Cambridge at the University Press.
- Rowell, S. C. (1994). Lithuania Ascending: A Pagan Empire within East-Central Europe, 1295-1345. Cambridge University Press.

| Preceded by Boleslaw I | Duke of Masovia; 1248–1262 | Succeeded by Konrad II |
