= Drohiczyn =

Town in Podlaskie Voivodeship, Poland

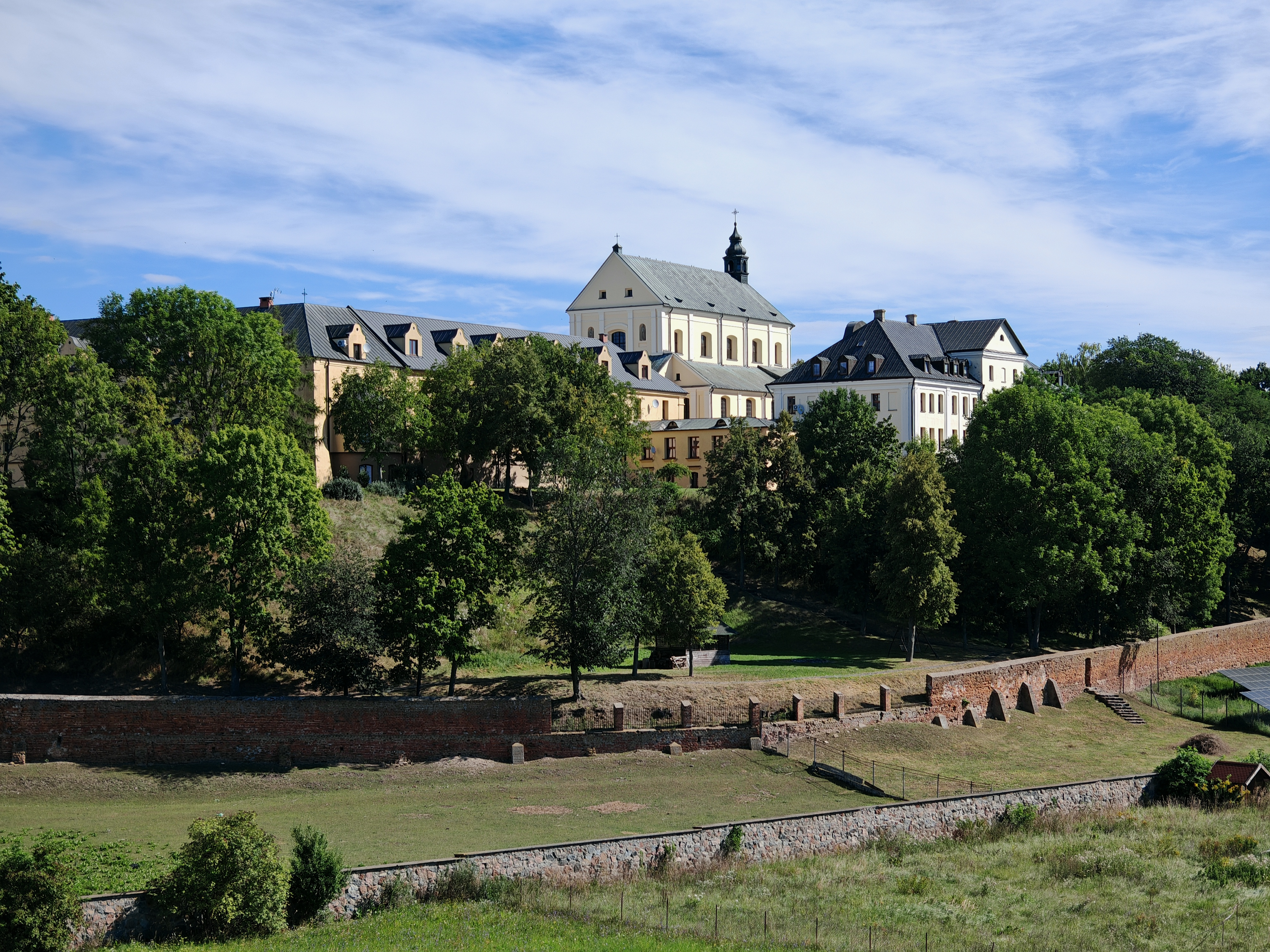
- Baroque Cathedral complex in Drohiczyn

- Coat of arms
- Interactive map of Drohiczyn
- Location within Poland
- Coordinates: 52°23′50″N 22°39′33″E
- Country: Poland
- Voivodeship: Podlaskie
- County: Siemiatycze
- Gmina: Drohiczyn

Area
  - Total: 15.68 km^{2} (6.05 sq mi)

Population (2006)
  - Total: 2,086
  - Density: 133.0/km^{2} (344.6/sq mi)
- Time zone: UTC+1 (CET)
  - Summer (DST): UTC+2 (CEST)
- Postal code: 17-312
- Vehicle registration: BSI
- Website: http://www.drohiczyn.pl

Drohiczyn [drɔˈxʲit͡ʂɨn] (Note: Lithuanian: Drohičinas/Drogičinas; Belarusian: Дарагічын, romanized: Darahičyn) is a town in Siemiatycze County, Podlaskie Voivodeship, eastern Poland. The town has a population of 2,110 and is situated on the bank of the Bug River.

Drohiczyn has a long and rich history, as in the past it was one of the most important cities of the region of Podlachia. It was a royal town of Poland and an early modern provincial capital. The town features a number of historic sites, notably Baroque churches and monasteries, as well as regional and diocesan museums and Poland's only Canoeing Museum. It is the seat of the Roman Catholic Diocese of Drohiczyn.

== History ==
A Neolithic settlement, La Tène culture crematoria, and ancient graves have been uncovered in what now is Drohiczyn. Drohiczyn, regarded as one of the oldest towns of the region of Podlasie, was in ancient times located among dense forests.

=== Middle Ages ===
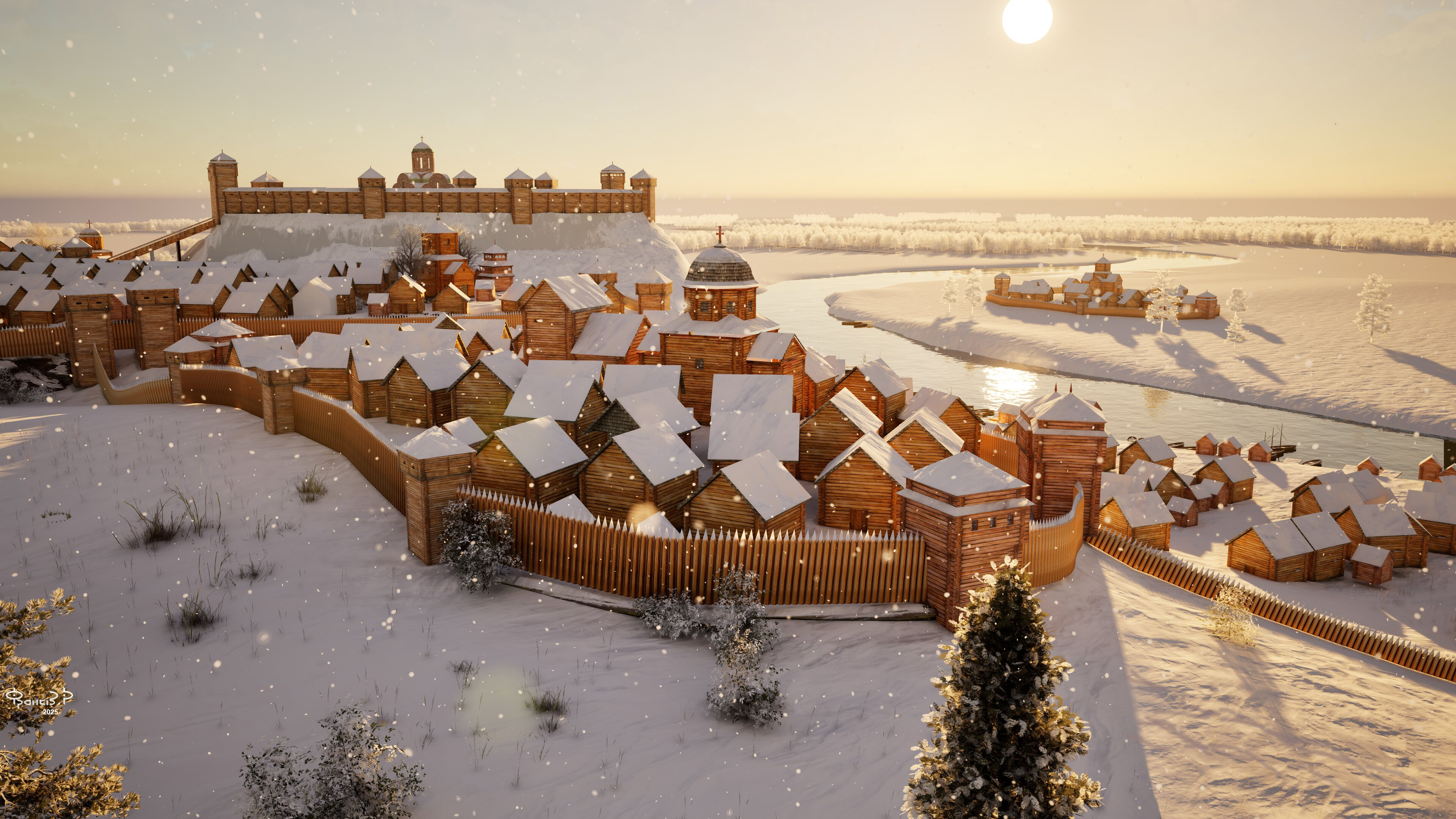
Modern visualization of Drohiczyn from the second half of the 13th century. In the foreground is the western suburb. In the background, a wooden castle on a hill, and on the opposite bank, the Monastery of the Savior.

In early Middle Ages, the town's territory was inhabited by the warring tribe of Yotvingians. It is not known who founded the Drohiczyn gord: it was most likely a defensive settlement of the Yotvingians, mentioned in Rus' chronicles in 1061. In 1142, Grand Duke Vsevolod II of Kiev divided his realm between his family, granting Drohiczyn (as Dorohychin) and Brest to his younger brother Igor. Some time in late 12th century, Drohiczyn was under the Polish rule. In 1192, near Drohiczyn, Polish Duke Casimir II the Just defeated Ruthenians, Yotvingians and Cumans. On March 8, 1237, Duke Konrad I of Masovia handed Drohiczyn, together with the area between the Bug and the Narew, to the Order of Dobrzyń. In March 1238, Prince Daniel successfully annexed Drohiczyn into Galicia-Volhynia after defeating Dobrzyń knights.

In 1241, taking advantage of the chaos which ensued after the Mongol Invasion of Poland, Lithuanian Grand Duke Mindaugas captured Podlasie together with Drohiczyn, Bielsk Podlaski, Mielnik, Brańsk and Suraż, annexing it into the Grand Duchy of Lithuania. The Rus dukes did not want to give up this region, and regained Drohiczyn after a few years. In 1251, Rus forces, gathered at Drohiczyn, invaded the Yotvingians. After a victorious war, the position of Duke Daniel of Galicia grew so strong that he was crowned the King of Ruthenia. This happened in Drohiczyn in 1253.

In 1274, Drohiczyn was again captured by the Lithuanians, and the town with whole province remained in Lithuania until the Union of Lublin (1569), with the exception in the 1380s and 1430s, when Drohiczyn was ruled by the Duke of Masovia Janusz. The Lithuanian duke Jonas Vaidutis was born in the town in 1367 and titled himself the Duke of Drohiczyn.

Drohiczyn was one of major cities of the Grand Duchy of Lithuania, together with Trakai, Vilnius and Navahrudak. In the 15th century, most of town’s population was of Ruthenian heritage, with Polish, Jewish and Lithuanian minorities. In 1498, its position was officially recognized, when it was granted Magdeburg rights.

=== Early modern era ===
During the reign of Sigismund I the Old, Drohiczyn was named capital and administrative seat of Podlaskie Voivodeship, which was established in 1513. Local sejmiks took place here. At that time, the town experienced its golden age. In 1569, along with Podlachia, the town was returned to the Kingdom of Poland by the Privilege of restoration of Podlasie land to the Polish Crown. The town continued to prosper, despite a plague outbreak in 1624, which decimated the population. Furthermore, in the 1630s there were two fires, in which several houses burned. Since mid-1630s, the population of Drohiczyn began to decline.

The Deluge (1655–1660) brought widespread destruction and misery, after which Drohiczyn never recovered to its former greatness. Swedish soldiers, led by Magnus Gabriel De la Gardie appeared in the town in August 1655. They immediately looted Drohiczyn, ordering its residents to pay an enormous contribution. In late 1655, a unit of Crimean Tatars, allied with Poland, appeared in the area of Drohiczyn and spent whole winter here, looting all farms and the town. On May 3, 1657, a Transilvanian army of George II Rákóczi, which also consisted of Swedes, Cossacks and Wallachians, captured Drohiczyn. Most of residents were brutally murdered, and the town, together with the parish church and the castle, was completely destroyed. Survivors fled to nearby forests, and the town virtually ceased to exist.

Drohiczyn slowly recovered from the destruction, but in 1699, it was burned again, this time by Saxon soldiers, who were on their way to Lithuania. The town suffered during the Great Northern War: hunger was widespread, and the marching armies of Sweden, Saxony, Russia, Poland and Lithuania looted Drohiczyn.

=== 19th century ===
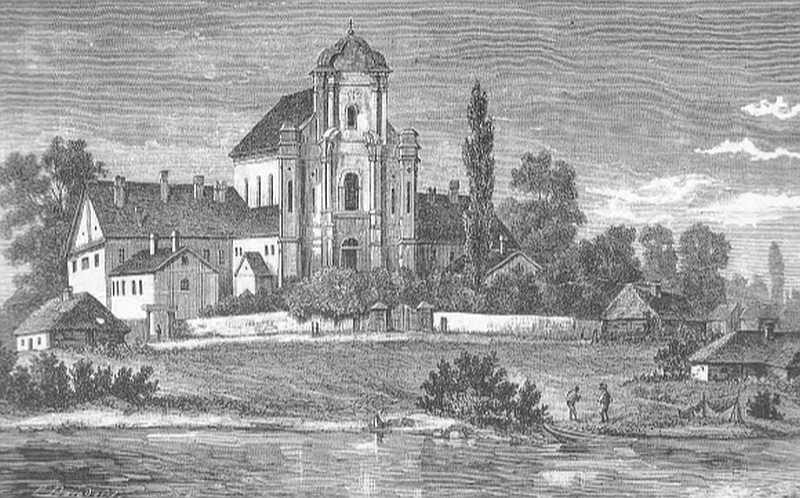
Baroque Benedictine Convent in the 1870s

Following the third partition of Poland, Drohiczyn was divided in 1795 between Habsburg Empire and the Kingdom of Prussia, as the new border went along the Bug river. On May 27, 1805, the town burned in a great fire, in which all archives, kept at the town hall, were lost forever. In 1807, the Polish Duchy of Warsaw was created, and Drohiczyn was once again divided between the duchy and Russian Empire. In 1808, Russian authorities created Drohiczyn County, part of Grodno Governorate. In 1861, the population of both parts of Drohiczyn was 1700, with 1400 living in Polish district, and 300 inhabiting Ruthenian district. Residents of the town and its surroundings actively participated in the January Uprising.

=== Interbellum ===
According to the 1921 census, the village was inhabited by 1,972 people, 1,165 Polish, 687 Jewish and 114 Belarusian by nationality, and 950 Roman Catholic, 814 Jewish and 207 Orthodox by religion. In the Second Polish Republic, Drohiczyn administratively belonged to the Bielsk County, Białystok Voivodeship.

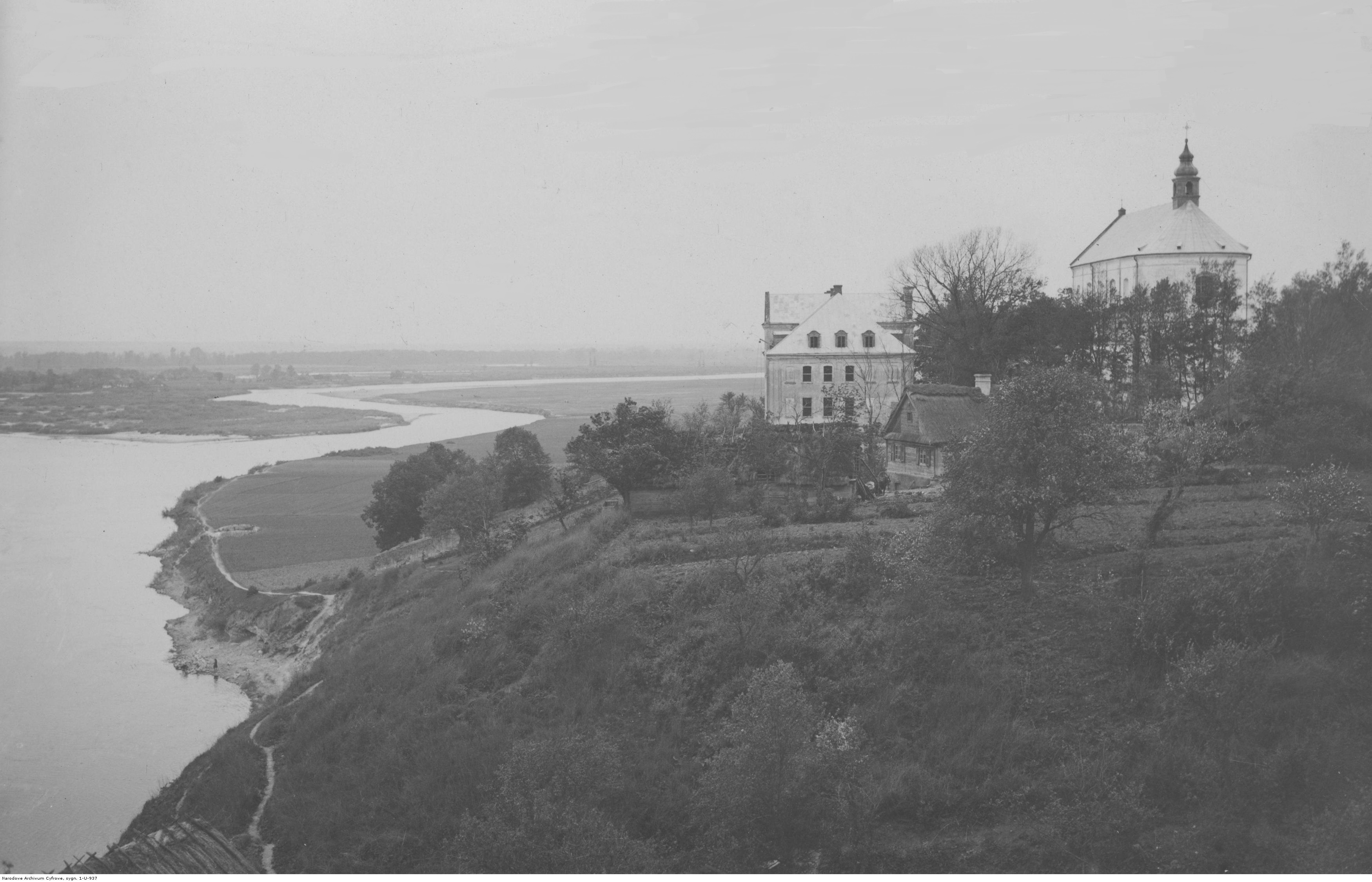
Drohiczyn in the interbellum

=== World War II ===
The town was briefly seized by the Wehrmacht during the Invasion of Poland, and on September 27, 1939, it was occupied by the Soviet Union. The Soviet regime immediately began expelling the town's residents to Siberia. Those selected by the NKVD were ordered to march with their bags to the rail station at Siemiatycze, located 20 kilometers away. There they were loaded into freight cars and taken to Siberia, where most perished.

In November 1939, after a rigged referendum, Drohiczyn was annexed into the Soviet Belarus, and USSR passports were handed to local residents. This resulted in mass draft of teenagers into the Red Army, also a large group of 14- and 15-year-olds was sent to the heavy industry plants at Omsk; most of them never returned home. Drohiczyn turned into a ghost town, with heavy Soviet patrols guarding the border. After a few months of Soviet rule, almost all foodstuffs were scarce, and local residents had to smuggle them from Germany, at risk of their own life.

Several Poles who were either born or lived and worked in Drohiczyn were murdered by the Russians in the Katyn massacre in 1940.

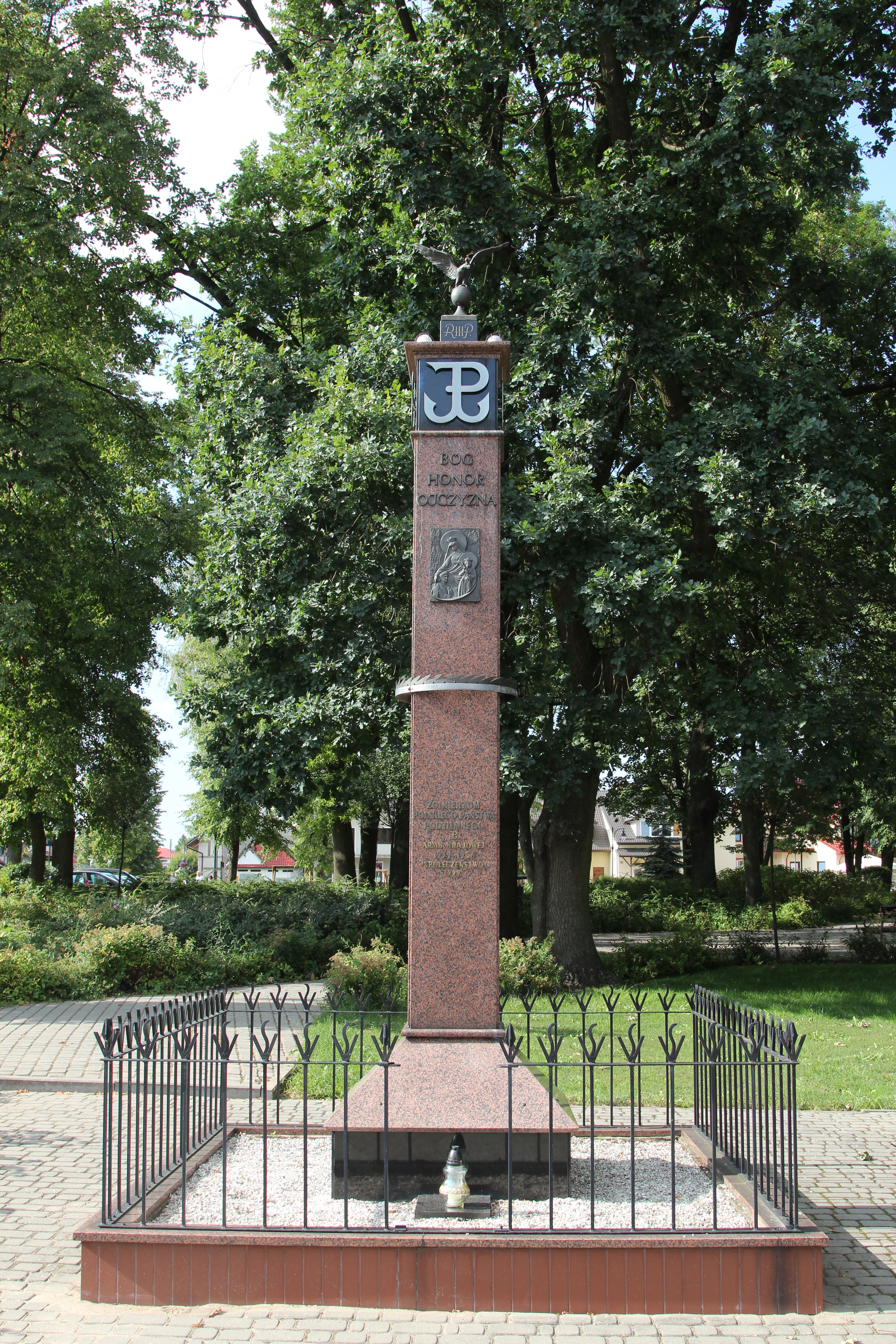
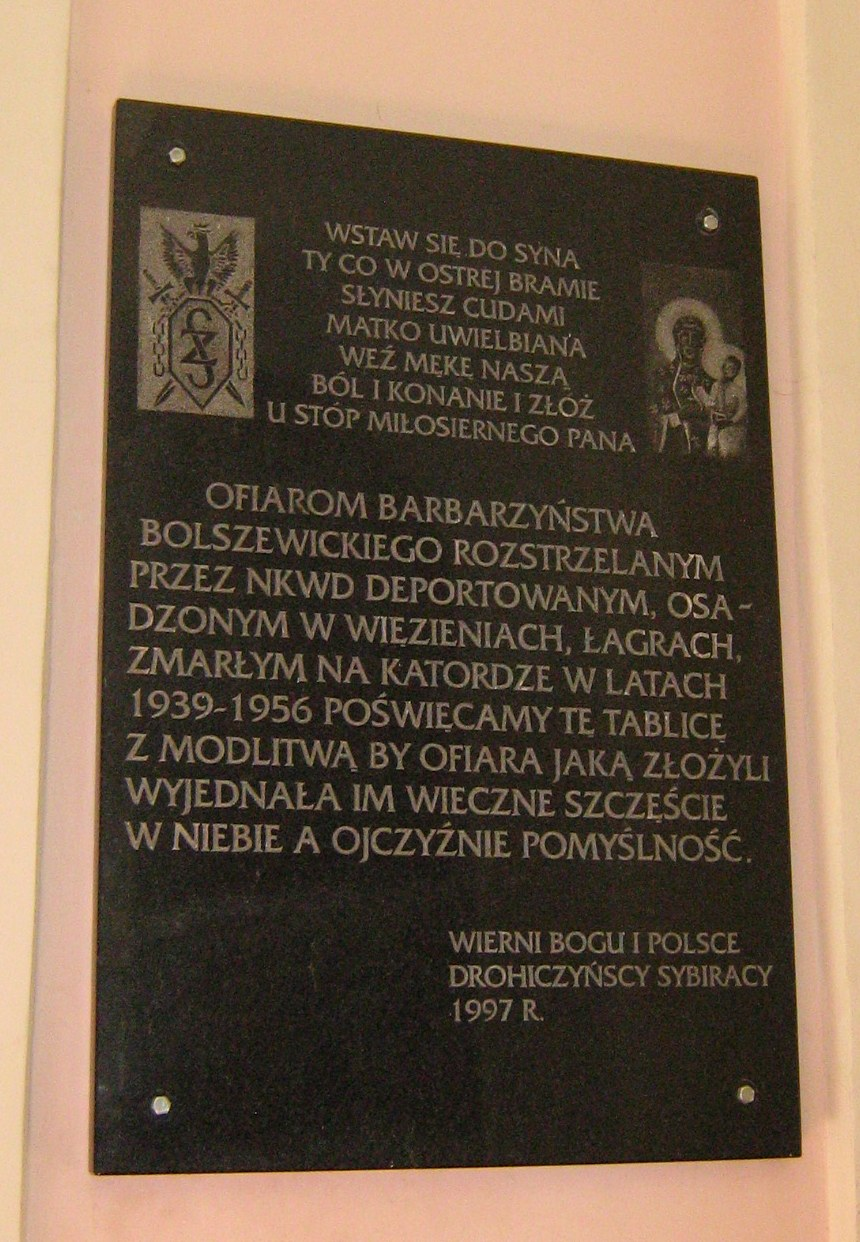
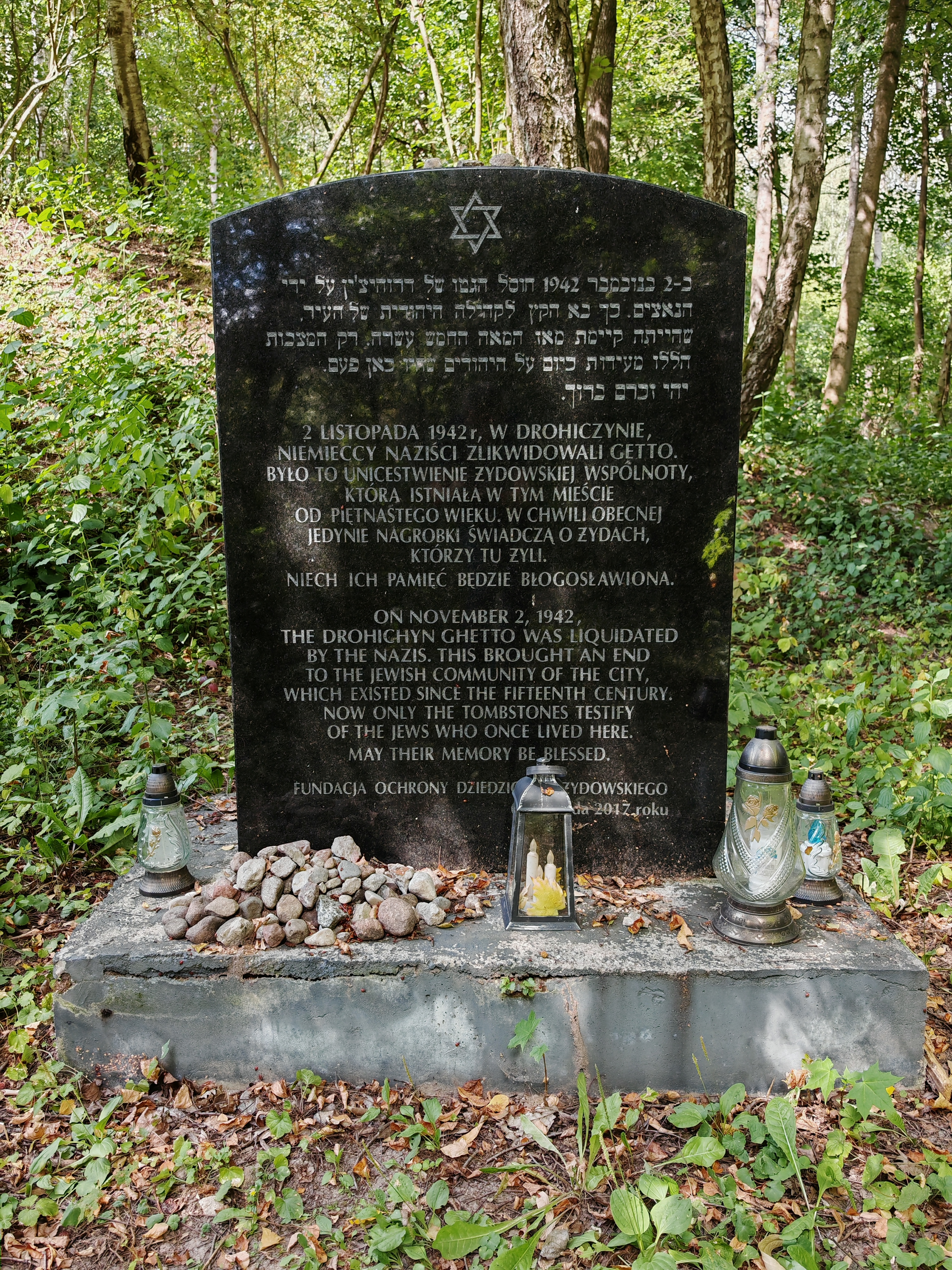
Memorials to soldiers of the Polish Underground State and Home Army, victims of Soviet massacres, deportations and labor camps, and victims of the Holocaust

In the spring of 1940, the Soviet commandant of the town ordered all houses located within 800 meters from the river to be moved to other locations, for security reasons, as the Bug marked the border between the Soviet Union and Nazi Germany. This order meant that most of Drohiczyn would cease to exist, as most houses and other buildings were located by the river. As a result, several historical structures were destroyed at that time, including two churches and a 17th-century manor house. The Soviets spared only the houses which were necessary for the border patrol and families of officers. Furthermore, the Soviet occupants devastated the local church, which was turned into stables, and a Benedictine abbey, which served as a warehouse of building materials. In search of gold and jewelry, Soviet soldiers destroyed tombs at the cemetery. The Russian language and Communist ideology were taught at local schools; several teachers were fired and arrested.

The German attack on June 22, 1941 took the residents of the town by surprise. Soviet authorities were also surprised, but before retreating, they managed to murder several men kept in the cellar of the abbey. As a result of an artillery barrage, many buildings were destroyed, and the ancient Franciscan church was damaged. Drohiczyn was quickly captured, and during the German occupation, the town was an important center of the Home Army and other partisan organizations. Local Jews were in the autumn of 1942 transported by the occupiers to the rail station at Siemiatycze, and then to Treblinka extermination camp. Together with the whole Bezirk Bialystok, Drohiczyn belonged to East Prussia, while the General Government was located on the other side of the Bug. German authorities permitted local Poles to settle in the border area, they also allowed the church to be reopened.

The Red Army entered Drohiczyn without resistance on August 1, 1944. The Soviet authorities were met with apprehension, as the locals remembered the terror of 1939–1941, and feared that Drohiczyn would be reattached to Soviet Belarus. Polish administration was created, together with school system. The NKVD arrested several soldiers of the Home Army, sending them to Siberia. In autumn of 1946, the local network of Freedom and Independence was destroyed, and its leaders were sentenced to death. Since Drohiczyn was regarded in the 1950s as the hotbed of pro-Catholic and anti-Communist reaction, the authorities neglected the town and its development.

=== Recent period ===
In 1991, the town was made the seat of the Roman Catholic Diocese of Drohiczyn as part of the newly created Roman Catholic Archdiocese of Białystok.

== Churches ==
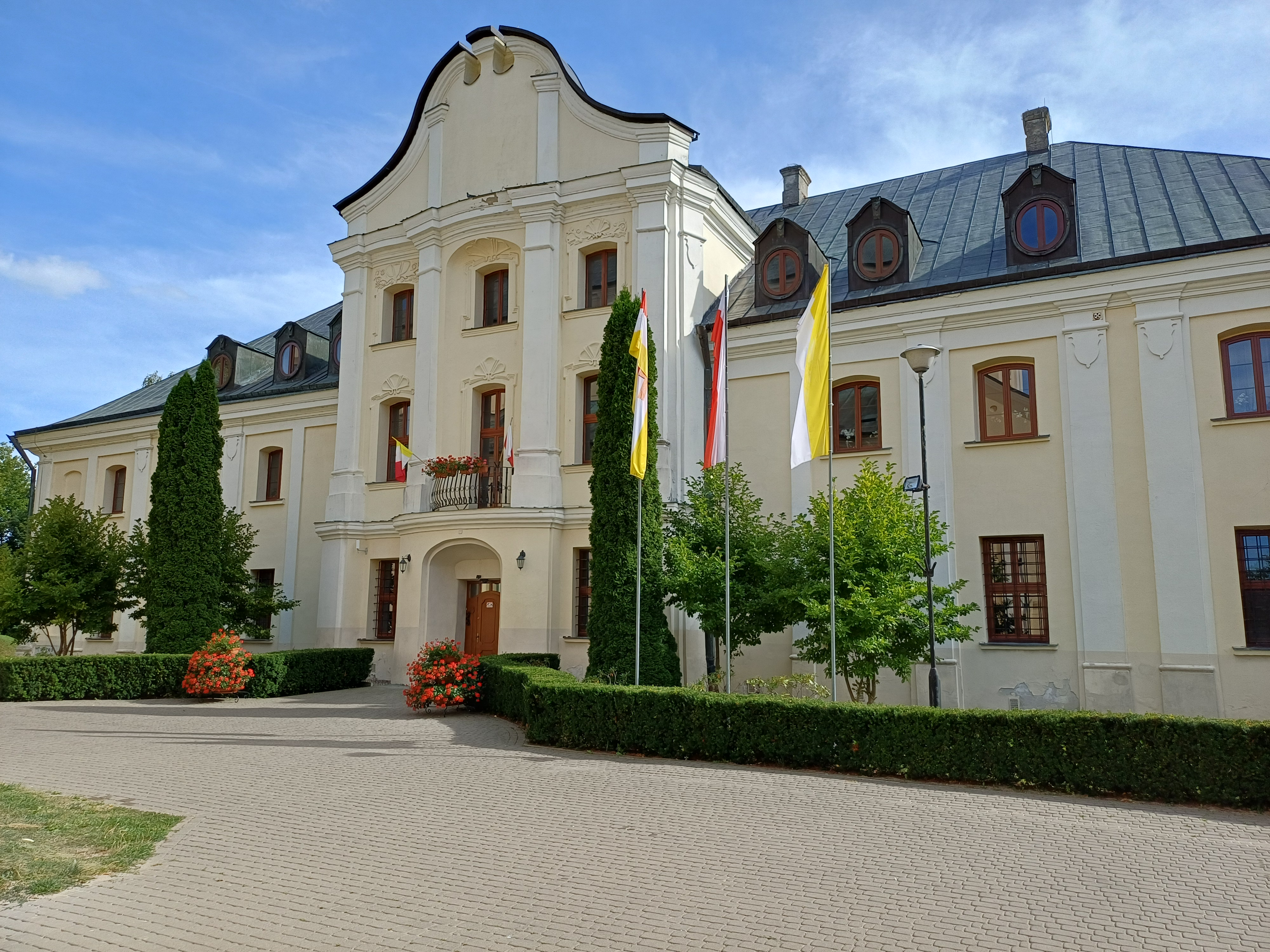
Theological seminary

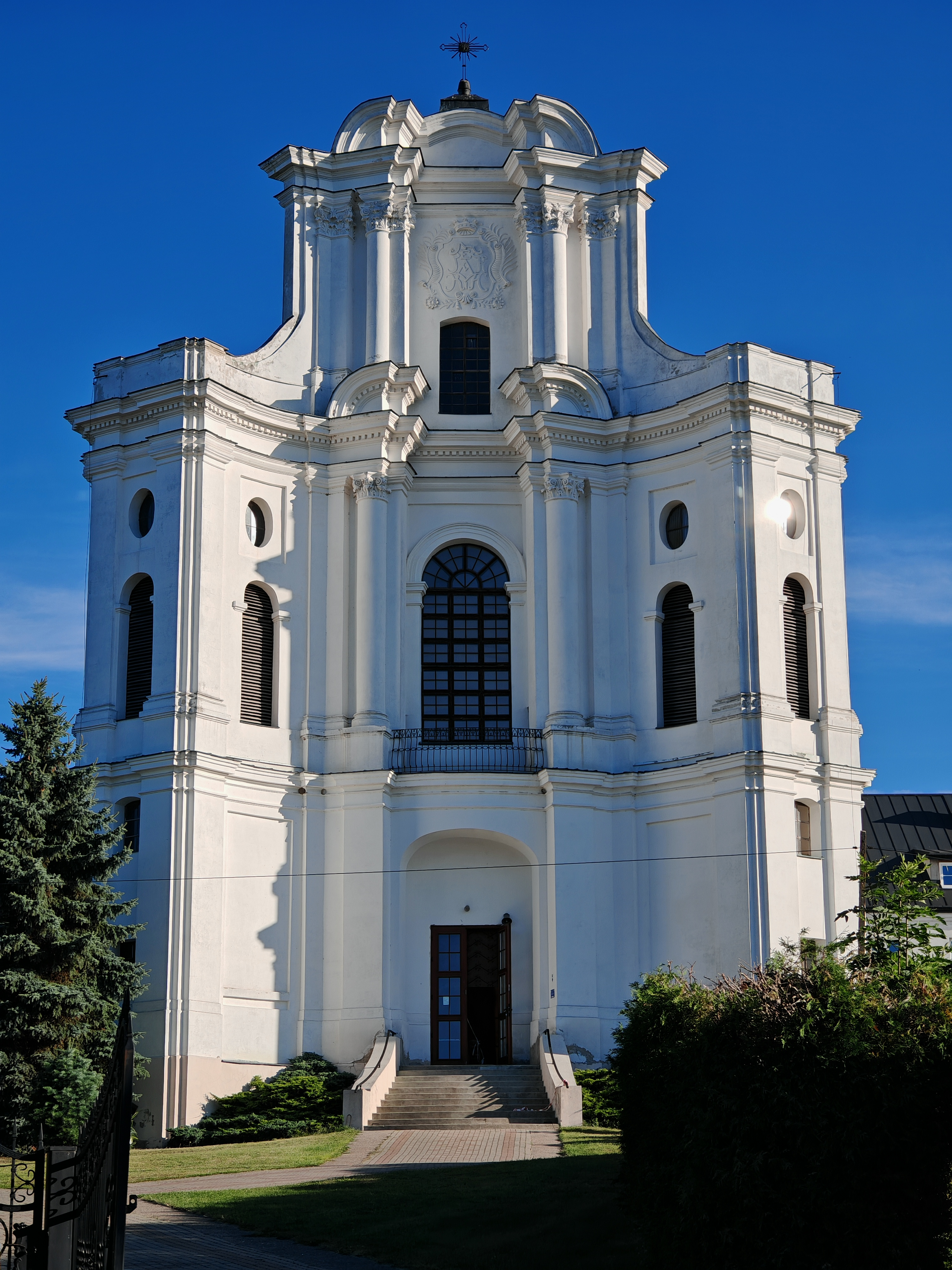
All Saints church

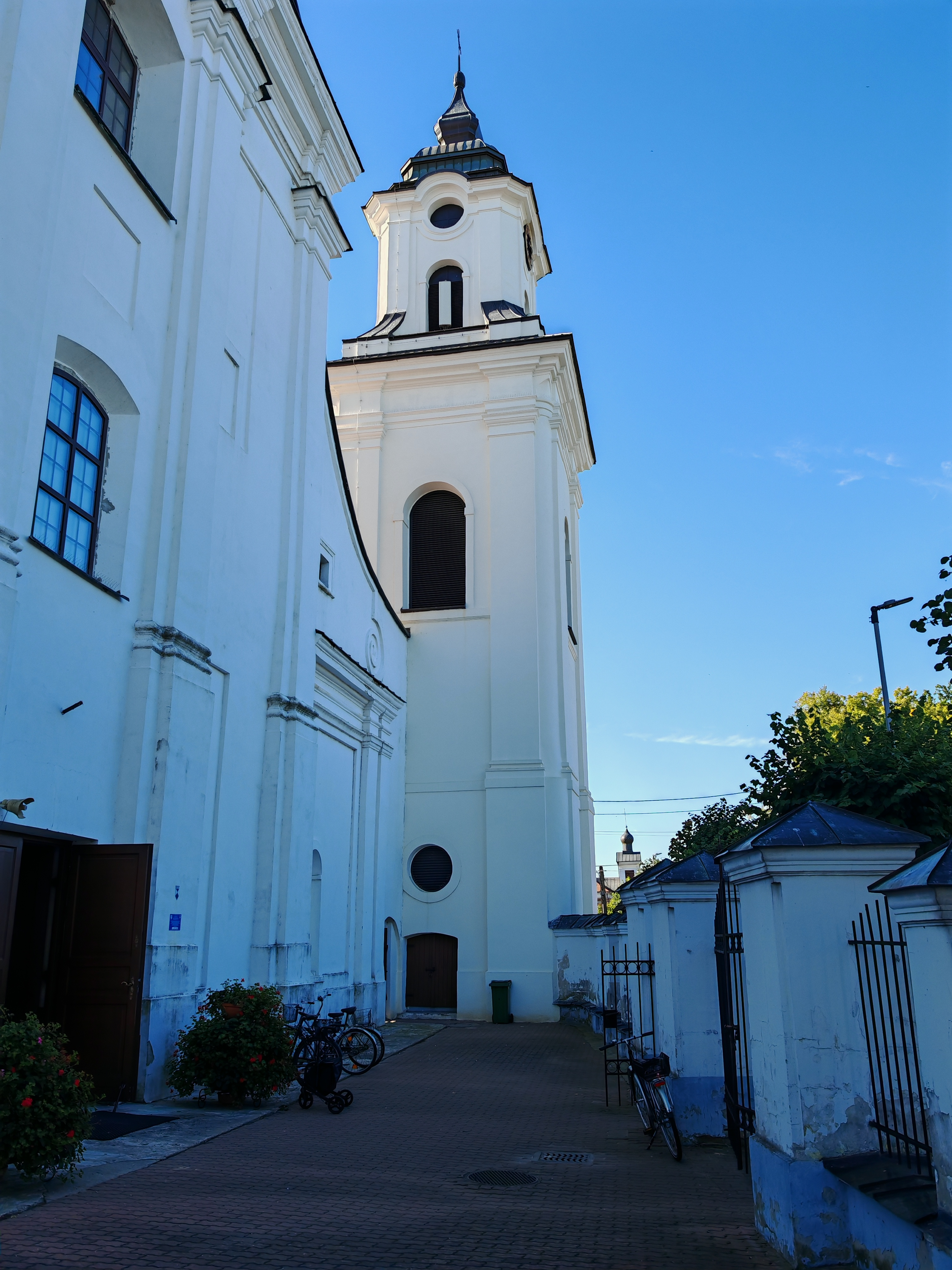
Church of the Assumption

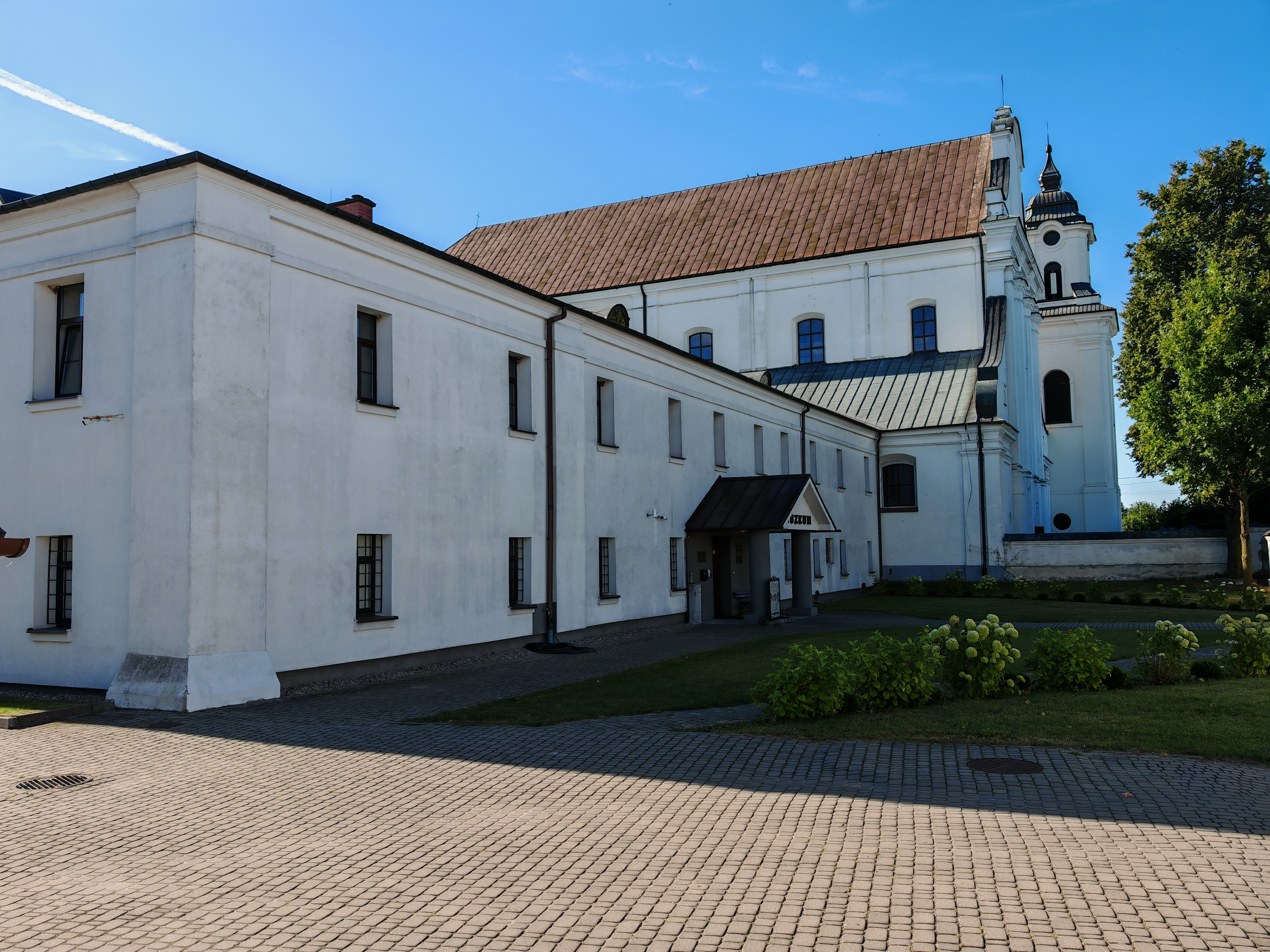
Diocesan Museum

In 1392, Władysław II Jagiełło founded a wooden Roman Catholic church in Drohiczyn. The church was replaced with a brick one in 1555. Burned by the Swedes in 1657, it was rebuilt in 1709.

== Transport ==
The national road 62 passes through the town.

The nearest railway station is in the town of Siemiatycze to the east.
