= Boleslaus of Masovia =

Boleslaus of Masovia may refer to:

- Boleslaus IV of Poland (1122–1173), Duke of Masovia and Kujavia
- Boleslaus I of Masovia (1208–1248), of Masovian Piast descent
- Boleslaus II of Masovia (1251–1313), of Masovian Piast descent
- Boleslaus George II of Halych (1308–1340), of Masovian Piast descent
- Boleslaus III of Plock (1322–1351)
- Boleslaus III of Masovia (1385–1428)
- Boleslaus IV of Masovia (1421–1454)
- Boleslaus V of Masovia (died 1488)
