= Casimir I of Kuyavia =

Polish prince (c. 1211 – 1267)

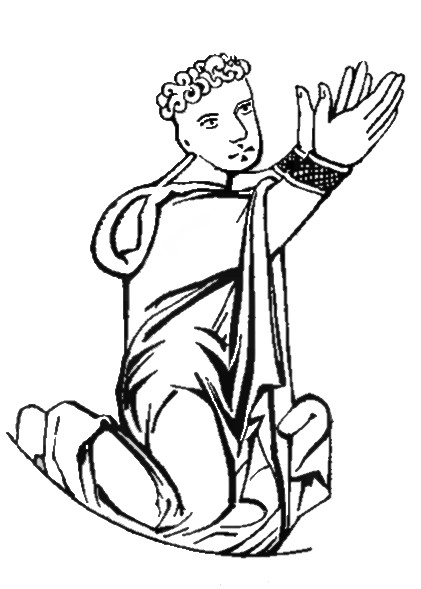
- Representation of Casimir from the Paten of Płock, 13th century
- Born: c. 1211
- Died: 14 December 1267
- Buried: Cathedral of Włocławek
- Noble family: House of Piast
- Spouses: Jadwiga; Constance of Wrocław; Euphrosyne of Opole
- Issue: Leszek II the Black; Ziemomysł of Kuyavia; Władysław I the Elbow-high; Casimir II of Łęczyca; Siemowit of Dobrzyń; Euphemia of Kuyavia
- Father: Konrad I of Masovia
- Mother: Agafia of Rus

Casimir I of Kuyavia (Polish: Kazimierz I kujawski; c. 1211 – 14 December 1267) was a Polish prince and a member of the House of Piast. He was Duke of Kuyavia after 1233, ruler over Ląd from 1239–1261, ruler over Wyszogród after 1242, Duke of Sieradz from 1247–1261, Duke of Łęczyca after 1247, and Duke of Dobrzyń after 1248.

He was the second son of Konrad I of Masovia and his wife Agafia of Rus. He was probably named after his grandfather, Casimir II the Just.

== Life ==
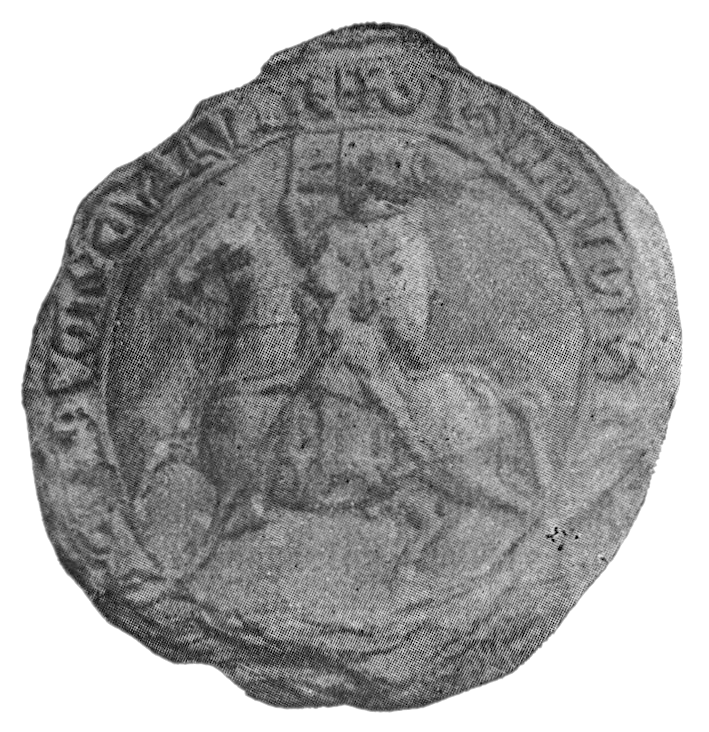
Casimir I of Kuyavia's Seal.

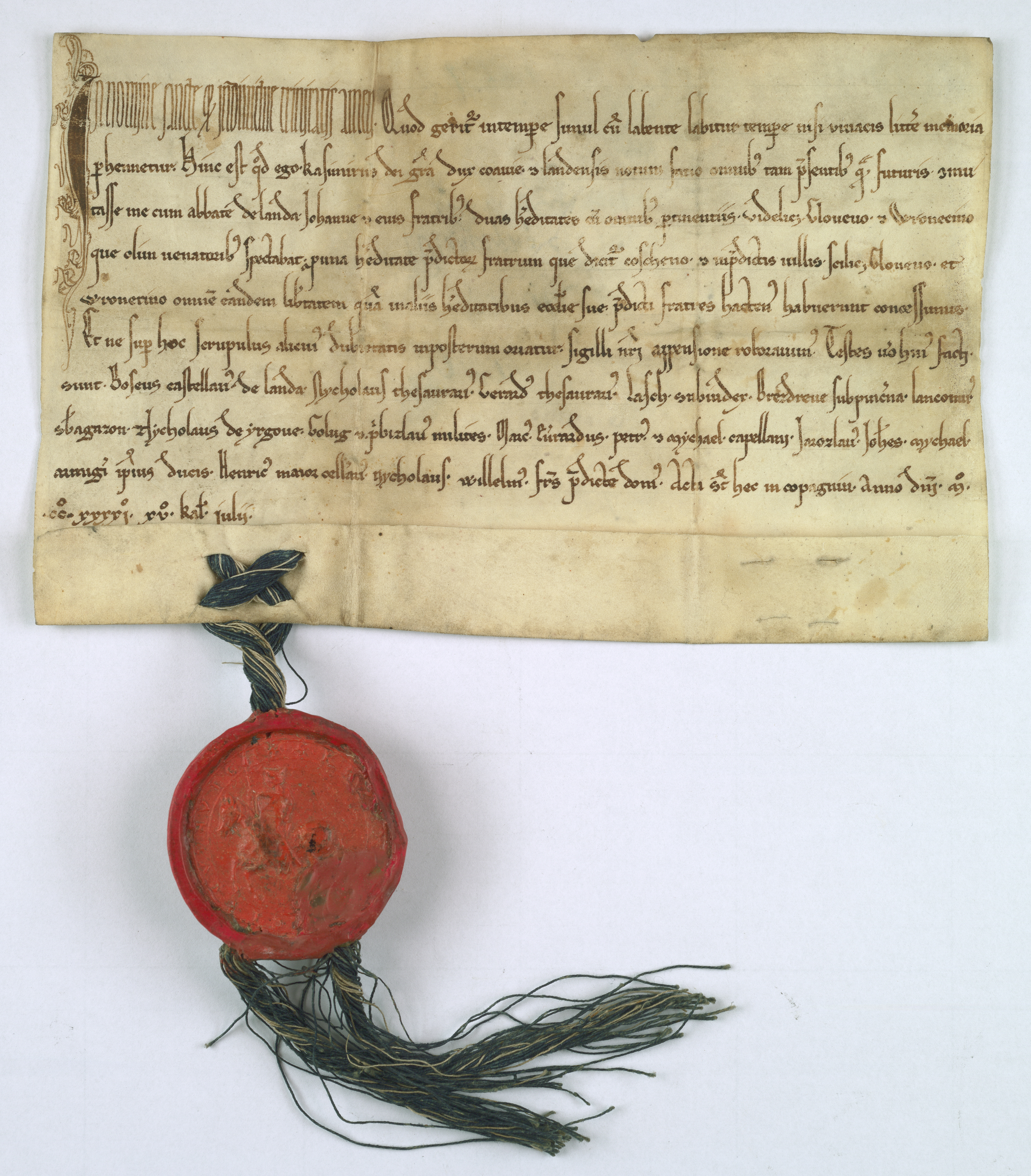
Document issued by Casimir of Kuyavia regarding Ląd Abbey

Casimir I received Kujawy (however, without Dobrzyń) from his father in 1233. In 1239, he would enlarge his domains with the castellany of Ląd, which he received as the dowry of his second wife. In subsequent years, Casimir I actively supported his father's turbulent politics, which brought him in 1242 to conquer the district of Wyszogród from the rulers of Gdańsk.

Konrad I died on 31 August 1247. According to his will, most of Masovia passed to his oldest son, Bolesław I, and the youngest of his sons, Siemowit I, received Sieradz-Łęczyca. Dissatisfied with his part of the paternal inheritance, Casimir I attacked his brothers' lands while they were in Płock at the funeral of their father, and was able to conquer Siemowit I's inheritance.

The next geopolitical change in Masovia came in early 1248, when Bolesław I died unexpectedly and without issue. In his will, he left all his domains to his brother Siemowit I. With this opportunity, Casimir I was able to take advantage of the confusion after his older brother's death and capture Dobrzyń.

During the 1250s, Casimir I was busy with his effort to Christianize the Yotvingian tribes and establish peaceful relations with them. His plans were not supported by the Teutonic Order, however, which had the Pope on its side. After this failure, Casimir I appealed to the Knights Templar, who settled in Łuków, in order to secure the northern border of his territory. It was not until 1263 that his relations with the Teutonic Order were normalised.

Meanwhile, Casimir I faced additional internal problems. In 1258, Bolesław the Pious, Duke of Greater Poland, allied with Wartislaw III, Duke of Pomerania, and attacked Kujawy, demanding the return of the castellany of Ląd. It was his opinion that the land was unlawfully transferred by Henry II the Pious to his son-in-law. The expedition was only partially successful, and so the following year Bolesław the Pious organized a more powerful coalition with Bolesław V the Chaste, Siemowit I, and Daniel of Galicia against Casimir I. This expedition was a complete victory, and on 29 November 1259, Casimir I was forced to surrender and promised to cede Ląd to Bolesław the Pious.

Ultimately, however, Casimir I refused to return Ląd, and this caused the coalition to attack again in 1261. Leszek II the Black, Casimir I's eldest son, took advantage of his father's difficult position and demanded his own district, using as an excuse the intrigues of his stepmother, who wanted to obtain more land for her own children. In the end, Casimir I was forced to not only surrender the castellany of Ląd, but also to give Sieradz to his son as a separate district.

Casimir died on 14 December 1267 and was buried in the Cathedral of Włocławek.

== Marriages and issue ==
Around 1230/1231, Casimir I married firstly with Hedwig (1218/1220 – 8 January aft. 1234), probably the daughter of Władysław Odonic. They had no children.

In 1239, Casimir I married secondly with Constance (c. 1221/1227 – c. 21 February 1257), a daughter of Henry II the Pious. As her dowry, she received the castellany of Ląd, which was the cause of Casimir I's long conflict with the Duchy of Greater Poland. They had two sons:

1. Leszek II the Black (c. 1240/1242 – 30 September 1288);
2. Ziemomysł (c. 1241/1245 – 29 October/24 December 1287).

In 1257, Casimir I married thirdly with Euphrosyne (c. 1228/1230 – 4 November 1292), daughter of Casimir I of Opole. As her dower, she received the district of Ruda, but the quick action of Przemysł I, Duke of Greater Poland, prevented this land from passing to the Masovian branch. They had four children:

1. Władysław I the Elbow-high (3 March 1260/19 January 1261 – 2 March 1333), King of Poland (1320–1333);
2. Casimir II (c. 1261/1262 – 10 June 1294), killed in battle against the Lithuanians;
3. Siemowit (c. 1262/1267 – 1312);
4. Euphemia (c. 1265 – 18 March 1308), married Yuri I of Galicia.
