= Agafia of Rus =

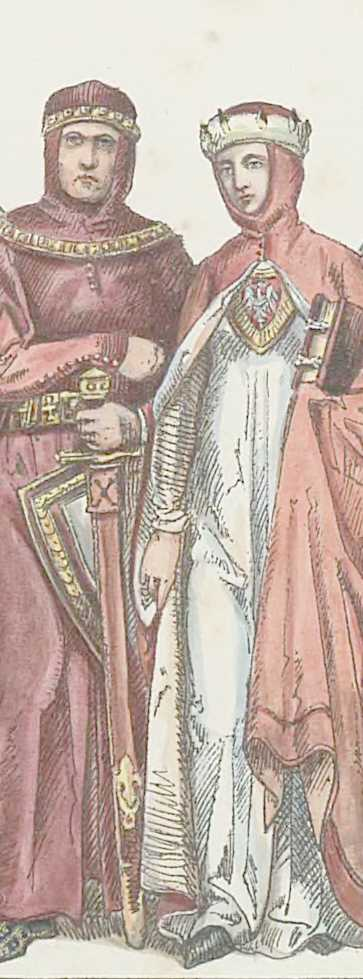
- Konrad of Masovia and Agafia, by Jan Matejko

High Duchess consort of Poland
- Tenure: 1229–1232; 1241–1243

Princess of Masovia
- Tenure: c. 1207–1248
- Born: c. 1190–1195
- Died: c. 1248
- Burial: Płock Cathedral
- Spouse: Konrad I of Masovia
- Issue Detail: Boleslaw I of Masovia; Casimir I of Kuyavia; Siemowit I of Masovia
- House: Olgovichi
- Father: Svyatoslav III Igorevich
- Mother: Yaroslava Yurikovna
- Religion: Eastern Orthodox (by birth); Roman Catholic (by marriage)

Agafia Svyatoslavna of Rus (between 1190 and 1195 – after 2 June 1248) was Princess of Masovia by her marriage to Duke Konrad I of Masovia. She was a member of the Olgovichi clan.

== Life ==
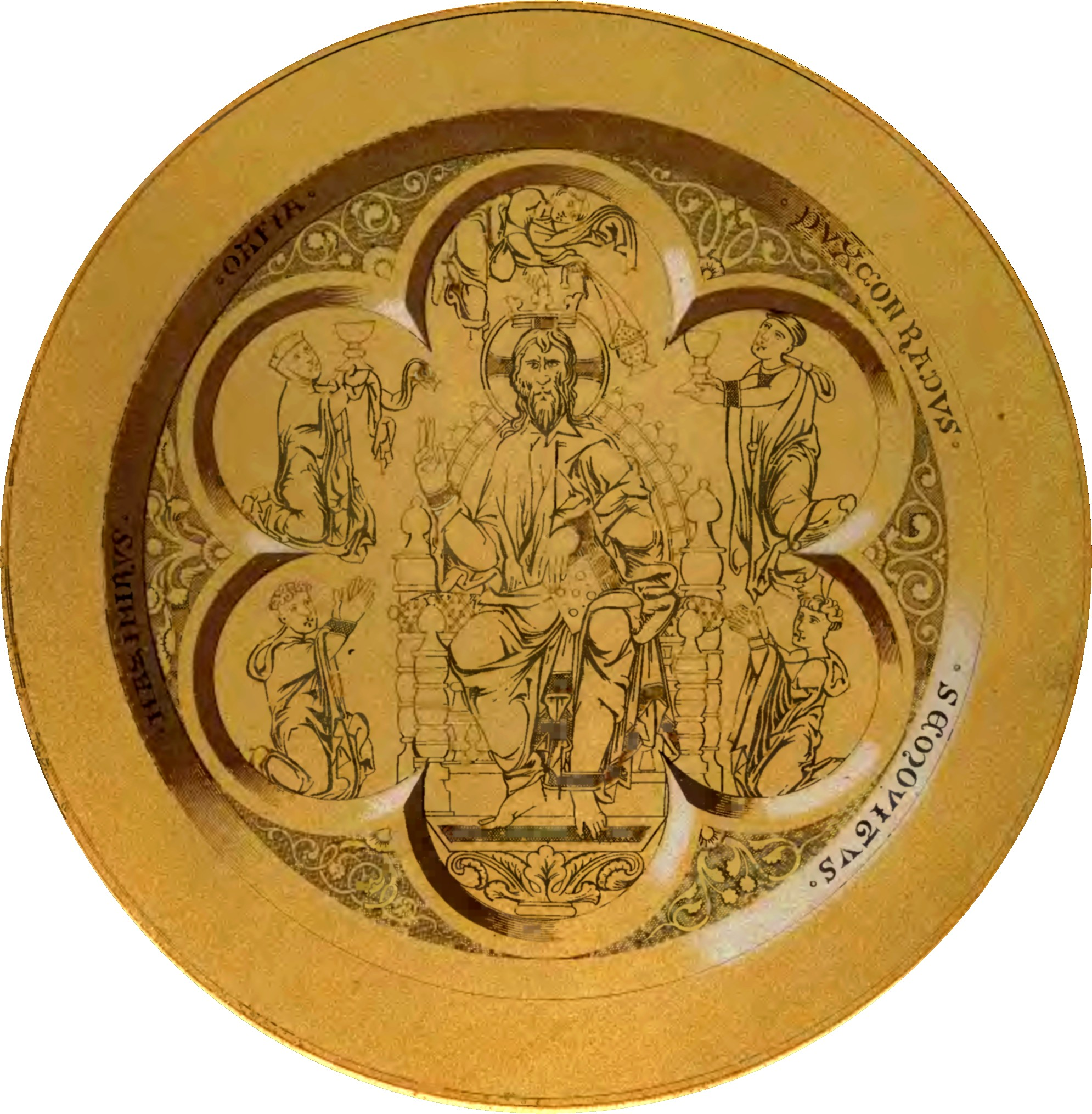
Chalice and paten of Konrad of Masovia. Agafia is at the top left.

Agafia was the daughter of Svyatoslav III Igorevich and his wife Yaroslava Rurikovna, a daughter of prince Rurik Rostislavich of Belgorod.

Between 1207 and 1210, Agafia arrived in Poland to marry Konrad I of Masovia. The marriage was for political reasons, as her father had become an ally of Leszek I the White and wanted to improve relations with the Polish nobility. Agafia and Konrad were married for at least thirty years.

Agafia was very supportive of bringing about the draft of the Teutonic Order. These efforts were successful and in 1227 the couple was greeted by Herman Balka, who brought the first knights. In 1239, there was a crime that involved Agafia's family. It started when their son Casimir married Constance, daughter of Henry II the Pious. John Heron, who had been good to the family and had educated Agafia and Konrad's sons, had shown disobedience towards Casimir after his marriage to Constance. John probably also disapproved of Konrad's rule in Płock. John was found guilty and put to death. He was tortured and then had a public hanging. Jan Długosz wrote: "And when he died his body was removed from the gallows and several brothers of a Dominican took him away to be buried. Since Agafia was involved in the conviction, she is now considered so blood thirsty, she became known as the second Jezebel. John was not buried; Agafia and Konrad had him hanged in the Płock Cathedral. The couple was also said to be cursed by Archbishop of Gniezno.

The news of the murder spread rapidly across the country. Archbishop Pelka placed a curse on Conrad and Agafia and laid an interdict on Masovia. The church bells were silent over Masovia and the citizens did not go to celebrate mass; there were also no funerals or weddings. Conrad was now running out of friends and had lost the faith of his subjects. Conrad went to the Łowicz Gniezno Cathedral and obtained forgiveness for himself and Agafia.

There is a plate displayed in Płock, which has Agafia, her husband and her two eldest sons on it.

Agafia's exact date of death is unknown. It is known that she outlived Konrad, who died on 31 August 1247.

It is believed that Agafia was buried at the Płock Cathedral.

== Children ==
Agafia and Konrad had the following children:

1. Boleslaw I of Masovia (c. 1210–17 April 1248), Duke of Masovia (1247–1248);
2. Casimir I of Kuyavia (born between 1210 and 1213 – died 14 December 1267) Prince of Kuyavia (1247–1267);
3. Siemowit I of Masovia (c. 1213–24 June 1262), succeeded eldest brother as Duke of Masovia (1248–1262);
4. Eudoxia (1215–1240) – The wife of Count Breny I of Wettin;
5. Ludmila (born before 1225);
6. Ziemomysł (born between 1216 and 4 July 1228, died between 10 July and 18 September 1241);
7. Salomea (born between 1220 and 1225, died after 30 August 1268), nun;
8. Judith (born between 1222 and 1227, died 4 December between 1257 and 1263) – married firstly to Mieszko II the Fat. Secondly to Henry III the White;
9. Dubrawka (c. 1230–1265);
10. Mieszko (b. 1235), died in infancy.

== Sources ==
- Berend, Nora; Urbańczyk, Przemysław; Wiszewski, Przemysław (2013). Central Europe in the High Middle Ages: Bohemia, Hungary and Poland, c. 900–c. 1300. Cambridge University Press.

Agafia of Rus Olgovichi Born: c. 1190 Died: 1248
Royal titles
Preceded by Lucia of Rügen	High Duchess consort of Poland (first time); 1229–1232	Succeeded by Hedwig of Silesia
Preceded by Anna of Bohemia	High Duchess consort of Poland (second time); 1241–1243	Succeeded by Kinga of Poland
