= Pietati proximum =

Pietati proximum (3 August 1234), more commonly known as the Golden Bull of Rieti was a papal bull by Pope Gregory IX which confirmed the Teutonic Order's domination of the Chelmno land east of the lower Vistula, and of any other lands conquered by Teutonic Order in Prussia ("to eternal and absolute ownership"). The German Orders should answer exclusively to the sovereignty of the Pope. The Bull of Rieti presented the written authorization of a previous verbal consent given in August and September 1230. The Grand Master of the Teutonic Knights, Hermann von Salza, had stubbornly insisted on a written document.

The Bull of Rieti corresponds to the Golden Bull of Rimini of 1226, with the Holy Roman Emperor Frederick II and the Treaty of Kruszwica of 1230 with the Polish Duke Conrad of Mazovia.

On 26 July 1257 this Bull was confirmed by Pope Alexander IV.
