= Order of Dobrzyń =

13th century Prussian military order

Emblem of the Order

The Order of Dobrzyń (Polish: Zakon Dobrzyński) or Order of Dobrin (German: Orden von Dobrin), also known as the Brothers of Dobrzyń (Polish: Bracia Dobrzyńscy), was a military order created in the borderland of Masovia and Prussia (today's Dobrzyń Land, Poland) during the 13th century Prussian Crusade as an outpost of attacks on Baltic Prussians.

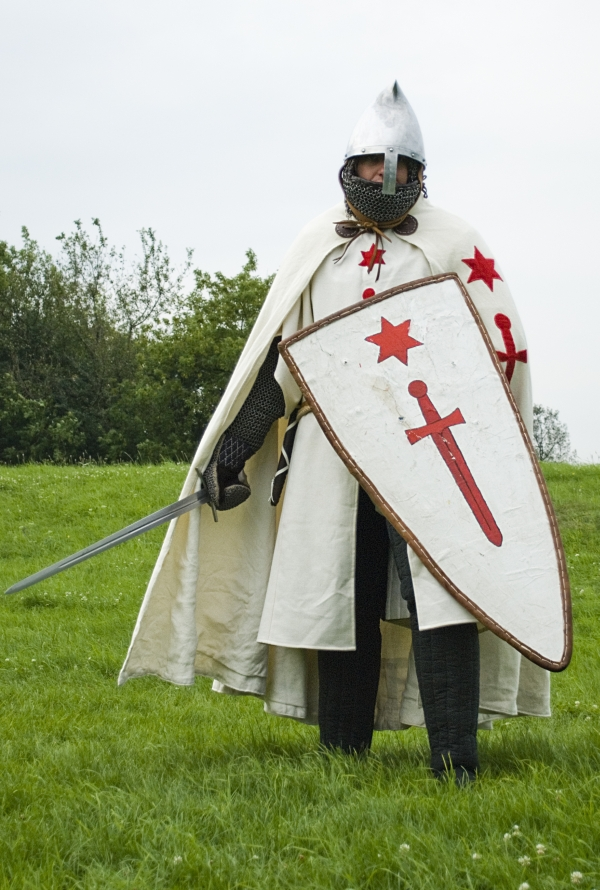
Historical reconstruction of a knight

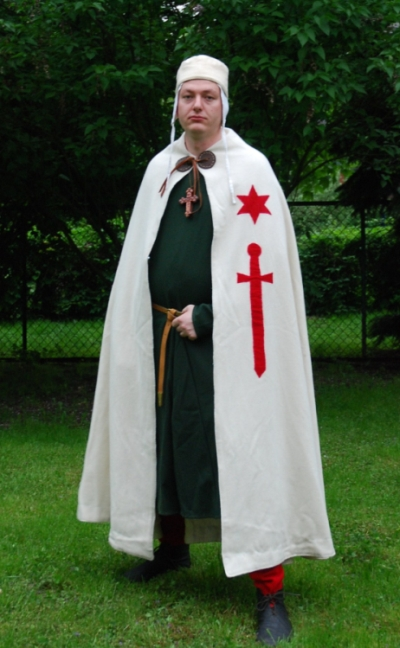
Historical reconstruction of clothing

In Latin the knights were known as being a smaller part of the much bigger and older Fratres Milites Christi (de Prussia, de Dobrin, de Dobrzyń, de Mazovia), and they were nicknamed the Prussian Cavaliers of Jesus Christ.

The Order was created by Christian of Oliva, the first Bishop of Prussia (1216–1228) as an outpost of Masovia and Kuyavia for the raids on pagan Prussians who defied Duke Konrad I of Masovia's attempts to subjugate them.

According to Jan Długosz, the creation of the Order was confirmed by Pope Gregory IX (1227–1241) in 1228. Duke Konrad granted the Knights the town of Dobrzyń (Dobrin) and the surrounding Dobrzyń Land (German: Dobriner Land), territory located south of and adjacent to Prussia. The Order of Dobrzyń was the only military order created in the territory of Poland.

At first the Order was composed of 15 German knights from Lower Saxony and Mecklenburg led by Master Brunon.

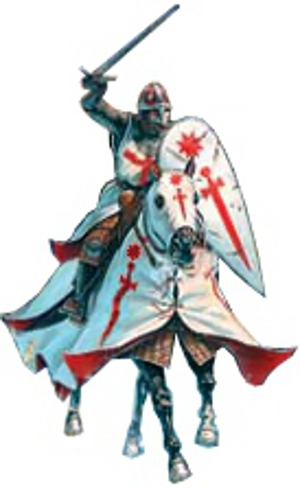

The Order of Dobrzyń provided assistance to the Cistercian missionaries in Prussia in an attempt to conquer and subjugate the pagan Prussian tribes. Their ideology was represented by their clothing - over their armor they had white cloaks, with symbols of a red sword raised up and a red star representing the revelations of Jesus to non Christians. The rules of their orders were based on those of the Livonian Order and the Knights Templar.

In the face of the Order's lack of success in battle against the Prussians, as well as their small number (at its highest, 35 knights), in around 1235 the majority of the Knights joined the Teutonic Order, as allowed by a papal document, the Golden Bull of Rieti.

In 1237 the rest of the Brothers were moved by Konrad to Drohiczyn to increase the military strength of that outpost. The Brothers of Dobrin were last mentioned when Drohiczyn was captured by Prince Daniel of Galicia in 1238.

== Bibliography ==
- Alain Demurger, Chevaliers du Christ, les ordres religieux-militaires au Moyen Age, Seuil, Paris, 2002 ISBN 2-02-049888-X
- Józef Marecki, Zakony w Polsce, Universitas, Kraków 2000
- Dick Harrison (2005). Gud vill det! – Nordiska korsfarare under medeltiden. Ordfront förlag. ISBN 91-7037-119-9
