= Nawojka =

15th-century Polish female student

Nawojka (pronounced: [naˈvɔi̯ka]; 14th or 15th century) was a medieval Polish woman who purportedly dressed as a boy in order to study at the University of Kraków in the 15th century. She is said to have later become a nun and is considered the first female student and teacher in Poland.

== Overview ==
The story of Nawojka was first told by the abbot Martin of Leibitz (d. 1464) in Vienna around 1429. Several versions of the legend exist.

One account states that she was the daughter of a teacher at a church school in Gniezno, educated by her father, who resolved that she continue her studies by any means necessary. Another version claims she was an orphaned girl who inherited a fortune. Yet another account ("this claim is as well documented as any other") places her origin in Dobrzyń nad Wisłą.

Regardless, disguised as a boy, she enrolled at the University of Kraków under the name Andrzej (or Jakub, according to some versions). At the time, women were forbidden from attending universities.

== Discovery ==
Nawojka successfully deceived everyone and studied for two years, gaining recognition as a serious student and scholar. According to a possible later addition to the story, she was offered a job as a domestic assistant to one of the professors but declined because servants were expected to accompany their masters to the public bath.

One day, her true gender was revealed. Again, accounts vary: one version says that two soldiers wagered that the student was a woman and exposed her; another claims that a son of a wójt from Gniezno, who had joined the school, discovered her secret; a third states that she fell ill, and a doctor learned the truth during an examination.

When brought before the authorities to explain her disguise, she reportedly answered: "For the will of learning". Interrogations of her fellow students and professors revealed no accusations of immoral conduct, and her academic record was excellent. Although she was not convicted of any crime, the judges were unwilling to acquit her entirely. According to Martin of Leibitz, she requested to be taken to a convent, where she took her vows, became a teacher and leader of the convent school, and eventually the abbess.

The veracity of this story is debated, but some historians suggest that if true, her time at the university would have been around 1407–1409.

== Legacy ==
The Jagiellonian University did not allow women to study until 1897 or to hold academic positions until 1906. The university's first women's dormitory, opened in 1936, was named after Nawojka. A street in Kraków is also named in her honor.
