= Dobrzyń nad Wisłą =

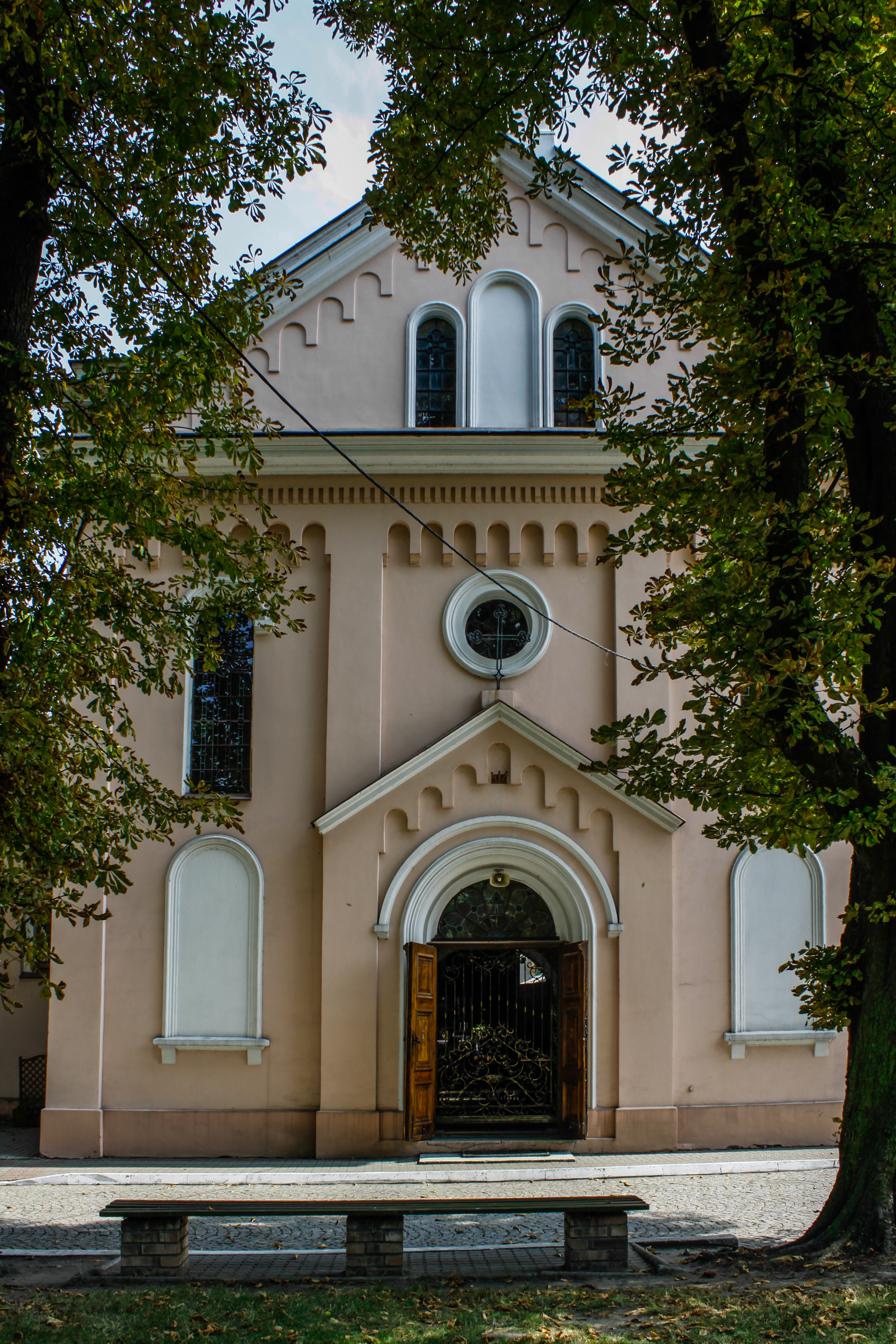
- Franciscan monastery church in Dobrzyń nad Wisłą

- Flag Coat of arms

- Location within Poland
- Coordinates: 52°38′16″N 19°19′17″E
- Country: Poland
- Voivodeship: Kuyavian-Pomeranian
- County: Lipno
- Gmina: Dobrzyń nad Wisłą
- First mentioned: 1065

Government
  - Mayor: Piotr Wiśniewski

Area
  - Total: 5.41 km^{2} (2.09 sq mi)

Population (31 December 2021)
  - Total: 2,025
  - Density: 374/km^{2} (969/sq mi)
- Time zone: UTC+1 (CET)
  - Summer (DST): UTC+2 (CEST)
- Postal code: 87-610
- Area code: +48 54
- Car plates: CLI
- Website: http://www.dobrzyn.pl/

Dobrzyń nad Wisłą (Polish: [ˈdɔbʐɨɲ ˌnad ˈvʲiswɔ̃]; German: Dobrin, 1939–1945 Dobrin an der Weichsel) is a town in the Kuyavian-Pomeranian Voivodeship, in central Poland. It lies on the Vistula River in the vicinity of Włocławek. As of December 2021, the town has a population of 2,025.

== History ==
=== Foundation ===
The settlement of Dobrzyń dates back to the Middle Ages. A stronghold existed at the site since 9th century, and later also a castle was erected. It became part of the emerging Polish state in the 10th century. The oldest known mention of Dobrzyń (as Dobrin) comes from 1065.

In the 11th century there was a castellan stronghold here. From 1228, Konrad I of Masovia allowed the military knights called the Dobrzyń brothers. The crusading Order of Dobrzyń was granted Dobrzyń as a base in 1228, although the knights were later incorporated into the Teutonic Order.

=== High Middle Ages ===
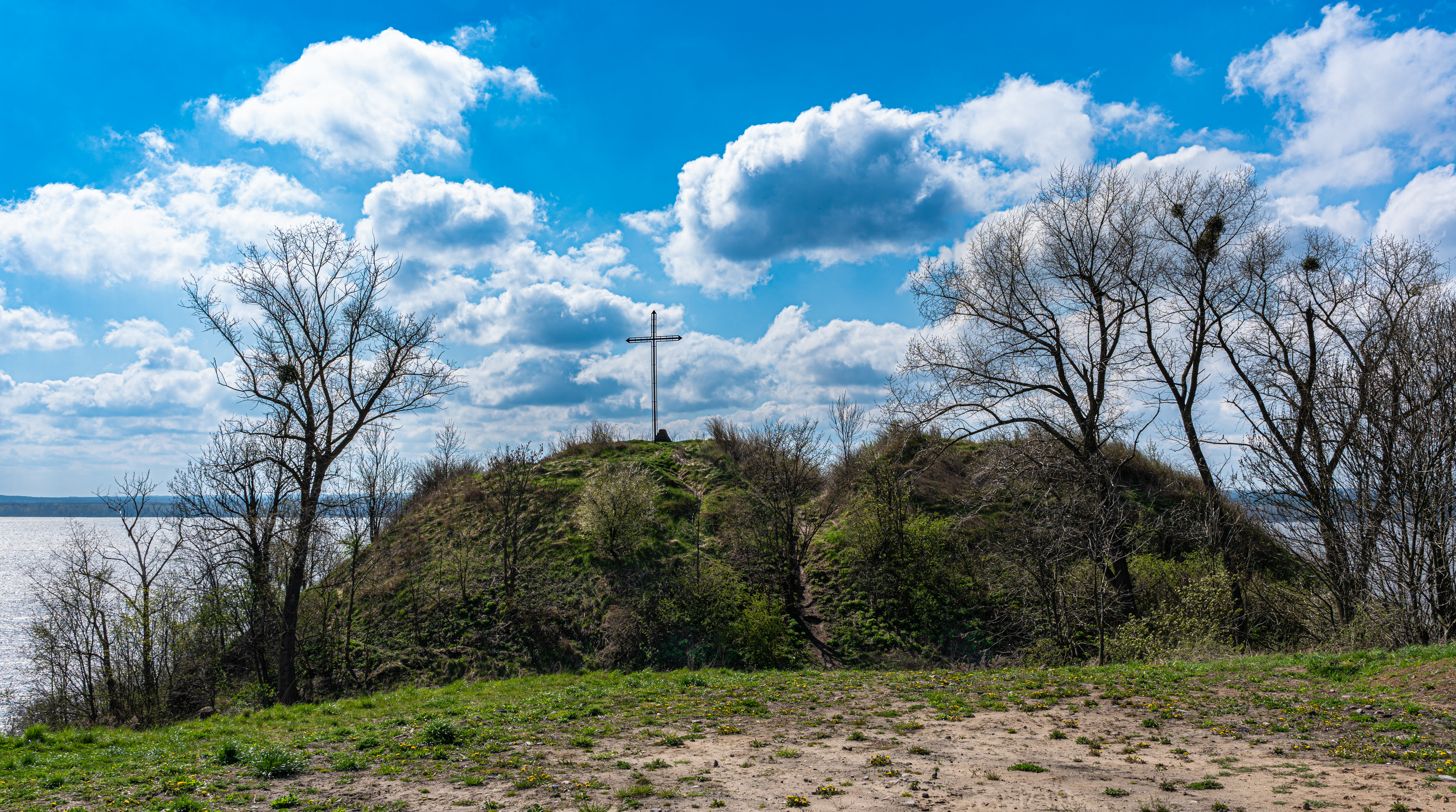
Castle Hill

The 13th and 14th century was tumultuous time for the town. Despite the town being accorded city rights by the beginning of the 13th century, and being the capital of a principality until the beginning of the 14th century, it bore the brunt of the conflicts between the state of Poland and the Teutonic Knights to the north. A castle was constructed by the Order of Dobrzyń. In 1235, the castle returned to the Mazovian dukes. In 1329, it was taken by the Teutonic Knights, who returned it to Poland after signing the Treaty of Kalisz in 1343. However, the Castle was destroyed in 1409. It was also sacked by Daniel of Galicia, who was King of Galicia in 1240.

A city was founded here before 1230 probably based on the Lübeck law. In 1230 document records that Wojciech was village leader from an unspecified town, identified in the literature with Dobrzyń.

In 1239, the village administrator of Dobrzyń called Konrad is recorded.

A village governor of Dobrzyń called Gocwin, is recorded with the erroneous date of 1296 (the correct year is 1306).

Some time before 1319, the governance of the village changed from an appointed administrator to a town council. In 1322, the head of the village Council, called Lemko, was mentioned.

The letter of the bishop of Warmia claims that in 1323, Lithuanians attacked the duchy of Dobrzyń and "Captured the town of Dobrzyń, destroying it by fire to its foundations; in it they killed two thousand people, while in the land itself of Dobrzyń — six thousand people of both sexes, also seven priests and forty other clerics whom... oh sorrow! they led away to perpetual slavery. Also they slew two monks of the order of St. Benedict, and burned ten parish churches, not counting chapels..."

The date of the attack is presumed to be on September 14, 1323. Chronicler Peter of Dusburg gives a figure up to 2000 people died in the sack. It took a long time for the town to recover from the attack, although the town retained its municipal rights. it was no longer a duchy.

During the raid of the Teutonic Order, the stronghold in Dobrzyń was attacked again in March 1329, when the towns mayor was killed by a catapult stone. In March 1329, after the siege, the Teutonic Knights occupied the castle in Dobrzyń.

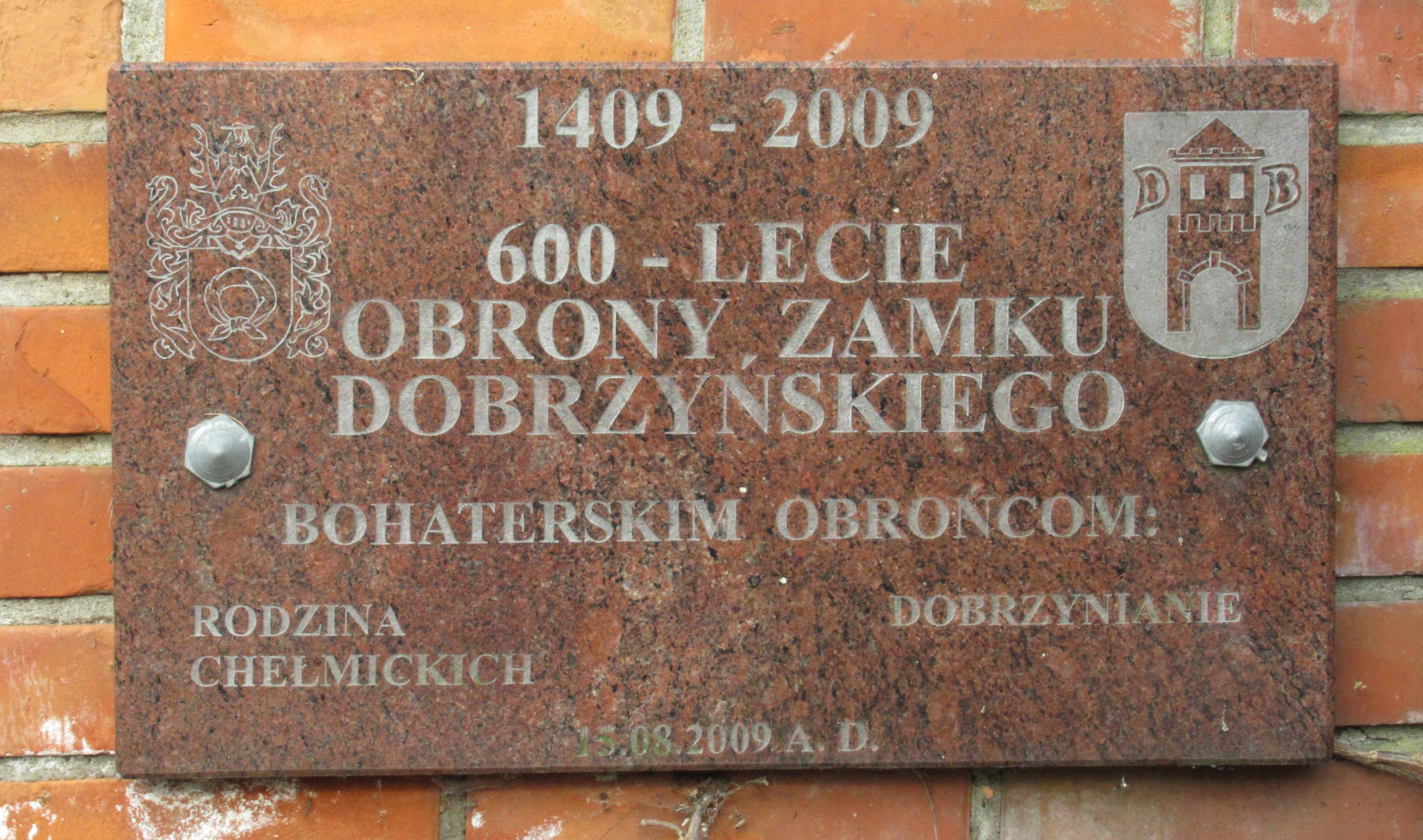
Plaque commemorating the Polish defence of Dobrzyń in 1409

After the peace of Kalisz between Casimir III the Great and the Teutonic Knights, Dobrzyń returned to Poland. From the end of the 13th and at the beginning of the 14th century (1288-1327 and 1343-1352) the town was the seat of the dukes of Dobrzyń. From 1380 the town was a fief of Władysław Opolczyk, who in 1392 gave in pledge to the Teutonic Knights. Thanks to the purchase of the pledge in 1404, the town returned to the Kingdom of Poland. King Władysław Jagiełło gave the rights to Dobrzyń to pledge to the Teutonic Knights, causing a legal conflict between Poland and the Teutonic Order which only ended on June 10, 1405, when Dobrzyń was bought by Poland. The Castle was besieged and burnt by the Teutonic Knights on August 18, 1409. But Dobrzyń was on August 20, 1409, captured by the Teutonic Knights again this time using artillery. The town was burned. Dobrzyń was returned to Poland at the First Peace of Toruń in 1411. The town became the seat of a judicial court at this time.

Dobrzyń was a royal town of the Polish Crown administratively located in the Inowrocław Voivodeship in the Greater Poland Province. Around 1388, a Franciscan monastery was founded in the town. In 1390, Władysław Opolczyk gave them some ground, and in 1395 Wojciech from Chełmica Mała of the Nałęcz family with his family gave monks 60 monies for the construction of a monastery church.

The semi legendary Nawojka is said to have been born here in the early 1400s, the daughter of the mayor.

The first historically recorded sejmik (local parliament) of the nobility of Dobrzyń Land was held in Dobrzyń in 1434.

=== Modern Era ===
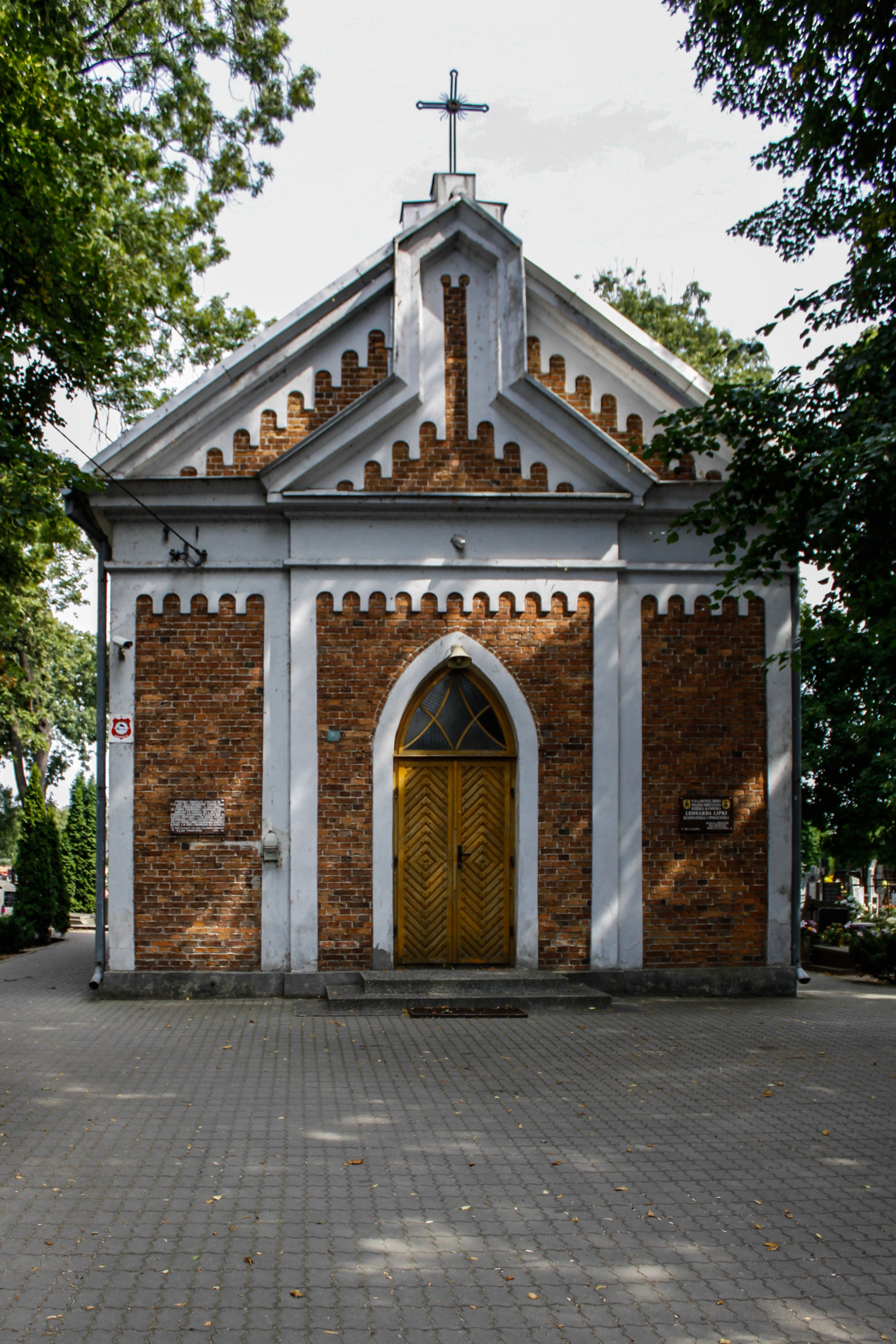
Saint Joseph chapel

The town flourished in the 15th and 16th centuries thanks to grain trade with the major Polish city of Gdańsk. Polish Kings granted the town various privileges in 1580 and 1587. Dobrzyń suffered during the Swedish Deluge, when it was looted and burned.

A Jewish community was established in the town in about 1765, and Jews at one time made up one-third of the total population, but most left for Britain and the United States in the years around 1900, with none remaining today.

In 1793, Dobrzyń was annexed by Prussia in the Second Partition of Poland. In 1807, it was incorporated into the short-lived Polish Duchy of Warsaw, and in 1815 it became part of Congress Poland, later forcibly integrated into the Russian Empire. In 1864, the town faced repressions from the Russian authorities after the unsuccessful Polish January Uprising. The Franciscan monastery was closed and the Franciscans were deported. During World War I, from 1915 to 1918, the town was occupied by Germany. In 1918 Poland regained independence, and the town became automatically part of the reborn state.

During the Polish–Soviet War, in July 1920, a Jewish pro-Polish committee of the Council for State Protection (Rada Ochrony Państwa) was established, whose members were local wealthy Jews and rabbis, and also a Polish recruitment office was established. The town was captured by the Soviets on 14 August 1920, and occupied for several days.

During World War II, from 1939 to 1945, the town was under German occupation, and the Germans changed its name to Dobrin an der Weichsel. Poles and Jews were subjected to arrests, expulsions and murder. As part of the Intelligenzaktion, the Germans arrested and murdered Polish teachers, also in the Mauthausen concentration camp. Jews were expelled.

Currently, it is a local commercial and service center with few industrial plants (footwear factory, fishing cooperative, slaughterhouse, mill).

== Famous people ==
- Adam Adamandy Kochański, 17th-century mathematician
- Marian Kowalski, 19th-century astronomer
- Nawojka, semi-legendary girl of the 15th century
- Samuel Vigoda (1895–1990), Polish-US Jewish cantor
