= Treaty of Kruschwitz =

The Treaty of Kruszwica (German: Vertrag von Kruschwitz), signed on 16 June 1230, was concluded between Konrad I of Masovia and the Teutonic Knights. According to this agreement, the Duke of Masovia transferred to the Teutonic Order the lands of Chełmno. In addition, Konrad I would recognize the independence of the Teutonic Order and its rule over all other conquests made in Prussia and beyond the borders of Poland.

The text is only known by later references, as the original document is not preserved. Polish historiography tends to adhere to the traditional view following Max Perlbach (1848–1921) that the Knights had forged it to create a legal basis for their secular possessions, however this position has been seriously called into question by modern historians, which tend to regard the document as genuine.

== Literature ==
- C. A. Lückerath: Treaty of Kruschwitz. In: Encyclopedia of the Middle Ages. Volume 5. Stuttgart 1991, ISBN 3-7608-8905-0, Spalte 1553.
