= Konrad I of Masovia =

High Duke of Poland from 1229 to 1232

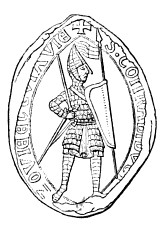
- Konrad's effigy on a seal

High Duke of Poland
- Reign: 1229 – 1232
- Predecessor: Władysław III Spindleshanks
- Successor: Henry I the Bearded
- Reign: 1241 – 1243
- Predecessor: Bolesław II the Horned
- Successor: Bolesław V the Chaste

Duke of Masovia
- Reign: 1194 – 1247
- Predecessor: Casimir II the Just; Helena of Znojmo (regent)
- Successor: Bolesław I of Masovia
- Born: c. 1187/1188
- Died: 31 August 1247
- Spouse: Agafia of Rus
- Issue: Bolesław I of Masovia; Casimir I of Kuyavia; Siemowit I of Masovia
- House: House of Piast
- Father: Casimir II the Just
- Mother: Helena of Znojmo

Konrad I of Masovia (ca. 1187/1188 – 31 August 1247), from the Polish Piast dynasty, was the sixth Duke of Masovia and Kuyavia from 1194 until his death as well as High Duke of Poland from 1229 to 1232 and from 1241 to 1243.

== Life ==
Konrad was the youngest son of High Duke Casimir II the Just of Poland and Helen of Znojmo, daughter of the Přemyslid duke Conrad II of Znojmo (ruler of the Znojmo Appanage in southern Moravia, part of Duchy of Bohemia). His maternal grandmother was Maria of Serbia, apparently a daughter of the pre-Nemanjić župan Uroš I of Rascia.

After his father's death in 1194, Konrad was brought up by his mother, who acted as regent of Masovia. In 1199, he received Masovia and in 1205, the adjacent lands of Kuyavia as well. In 1205, he and his brother, Duke Leszek I the White of Sandomierz, had their greatest military victory at Battle of Zawichost against Prince Roman the Great of Galicia–Volhynia. The Ruthenian army was crushed and Roman was killed in battle. The Rurik princess Agafia of Rus became his wife.

=== Attempted conquests of Prussia ===
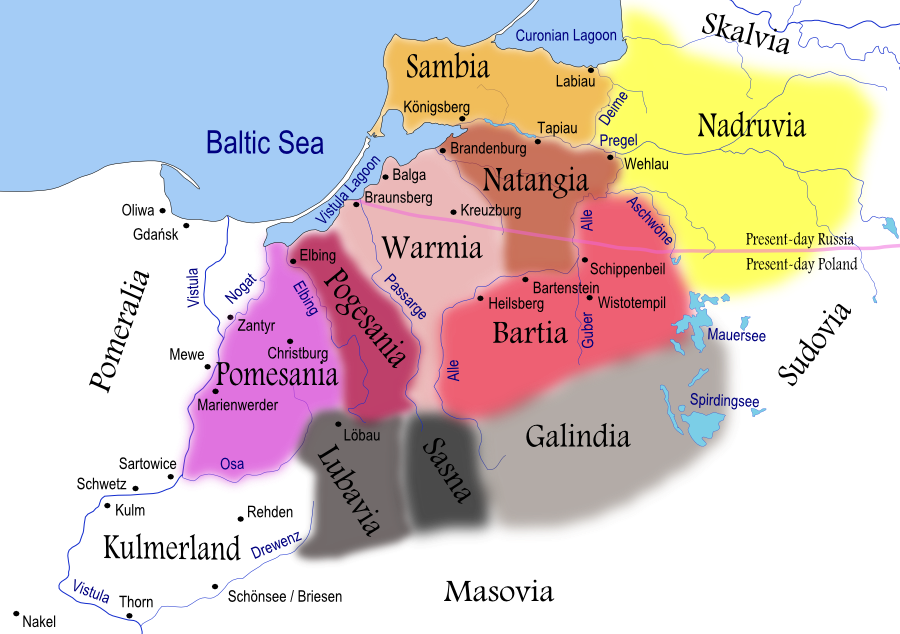
Prussian tribes (coloured areas) in the 13th century with Chełmno Land (Kulmerland), white, in the southwest already under control of the Teutonic Order

In an effort to enlarge his dominions, Konrad unsuccessfully attempted to conquer the adjacent pagan lands of Chełmno in Prussia during a 1209 crusade with the consent of Pope Innocent III. In 1215, the monk Christian of Oliva was appointed a missionary bishop among the Old Prussians, his residence at Chełmno, however, was devastated by Prussian forces the next year. Several further campaigns in 1219, 1222 failed; instead, Konrad picked a long-term border quarrel with the Prussian tribes.

The duke's ongoing attempts on Prussia were answered by incursions across the borders of his Masovian lands, while Prussians were in the process of gaining back control over the disputed Chełmno Land and even threatened Konrad's residence at Płock Castle. Subjected to constant Prussian raids and counter-raids, Konrad now wanted to stabilise the north of his Duchy of Masovia in this fight over the border area of Chełmno.

=== Teutonic Order ===
Thus in 1226, Konrad, having difficulty with constant raids over his territory, invited the religious military order of the Teutonic Knights to fight the Prussians, as they already had supported the Kingdom of Hungary against the Cuman people in the Transylavanian Burzenland from 1211 to 1225. When they notified Hungary that the Order was, firstly, responsible to the pope, the Knights were expelled by the Hungarian King Andrew II though. Thus, in turn for the Order's service, Grand Master Herman of Salza wanted to have its rights documented beforehand, by a deal with Konrad that was to be confirmed by the Holy Roman Emperor and the Roman Curia.

Emperor Frederick II issued in March 1226 the Golden Bull of Rimini, stating that:

"[...] our trusty Brother Herman, the worthy Master of the Sacred House of the Hospital of St. Mary of the Germans in Jerusalem [i.e., the Teutonic Order] has explained [...] that our devoted Konrad (Chünradus), Duke of Masovia and of Kuyavia (Cuiaviae), has promised and undertaken to provide to him and to his brethren from that land, which is called the Chelmło Land (terra quae vocatur Culmen), and in that other land, that is to say, between his borderland (marchiam) and the territories of the Prussians (confinia Prutenorum), that they may thus indeed take up the task and readily embark upon the invasion and obtaining of the land of Prussia (terram Prusciae) for the honor and glory of the true God.

"We therefore [...] especially because the land itself is held under the sole rule of the Empire (sub monarchia imperii), trusting also in the judgment (prudentia) of the same Master, because he is a man mighty both in deed and word and through his own and his brethren's perseverance is mightily undertaking and manfully carrying out the conquest of that land [...] even though many, vainly besought with numerous exertions in this business, gave up (defecerunt) just when they seemed about to set forth, grant the land of Prussia to the same Master along with the forces of his order and with all those who think to invade [it][...]"

So far, the Knights were not convinced to take the trouble of fighting the Prussians. On the advice of the first Prussian bishop, Christian of Oliva, Konrad instead founded the Loyal Order of Dobrzyń in 1228. He then called for another Prussian Crusade, and was again defeated. In view of an imminent Prussian invasion, Konrad supposedly signed the Treaty of Kruszwica in 1230, according to which he granted Chełmno Land to the Teutonic Knights and the Order of Dobrzyń. By this donation, disclaiming any enfeoffment, Konrad established the nucleus of the State of the Teutonic Order. However, the document does not exist and it is believed that it was never signed and that the Order most likely forged it. The Knights under the command of Hermann Balk crossed the Vistula river and conquered Chełmno Land, erecting the castle of Toruń (Thorn) in 1231. In 1234, Pope Gregory IX issued the Golden Bull of Rieti, confirming the prior deals with the Teutonic Knights, stating that the land of the Order was only subject to the Pope, not a fief of anyone. In 1237, the Order's lands were confiscated by Konrad and forced to invest in the town of Dobryczin.

=== High Duke ===
Konrad was also entangled in the conflict over the Polish Seniorate Province with his Piast cousin, Duke Władysław III Spindleshanks of Greater Poland and assumed the title of a Polish High Duke in 1229. However, their Silesian relative Duke Henry I the Bearded finally prevailed as High Duke at Kraków in 1232 and confined Konrad's rule again to Masovia. When Henry's son and heir, High Duke Henry II the Pious was killed at the 1241 Battle of Legnica, Konrad once again assumed the senioral title, but had to yield to the claims raised by his nephew Bolesław V the Chaste, son of his elder brother Leszek, two years later.

== Marriage and children ==
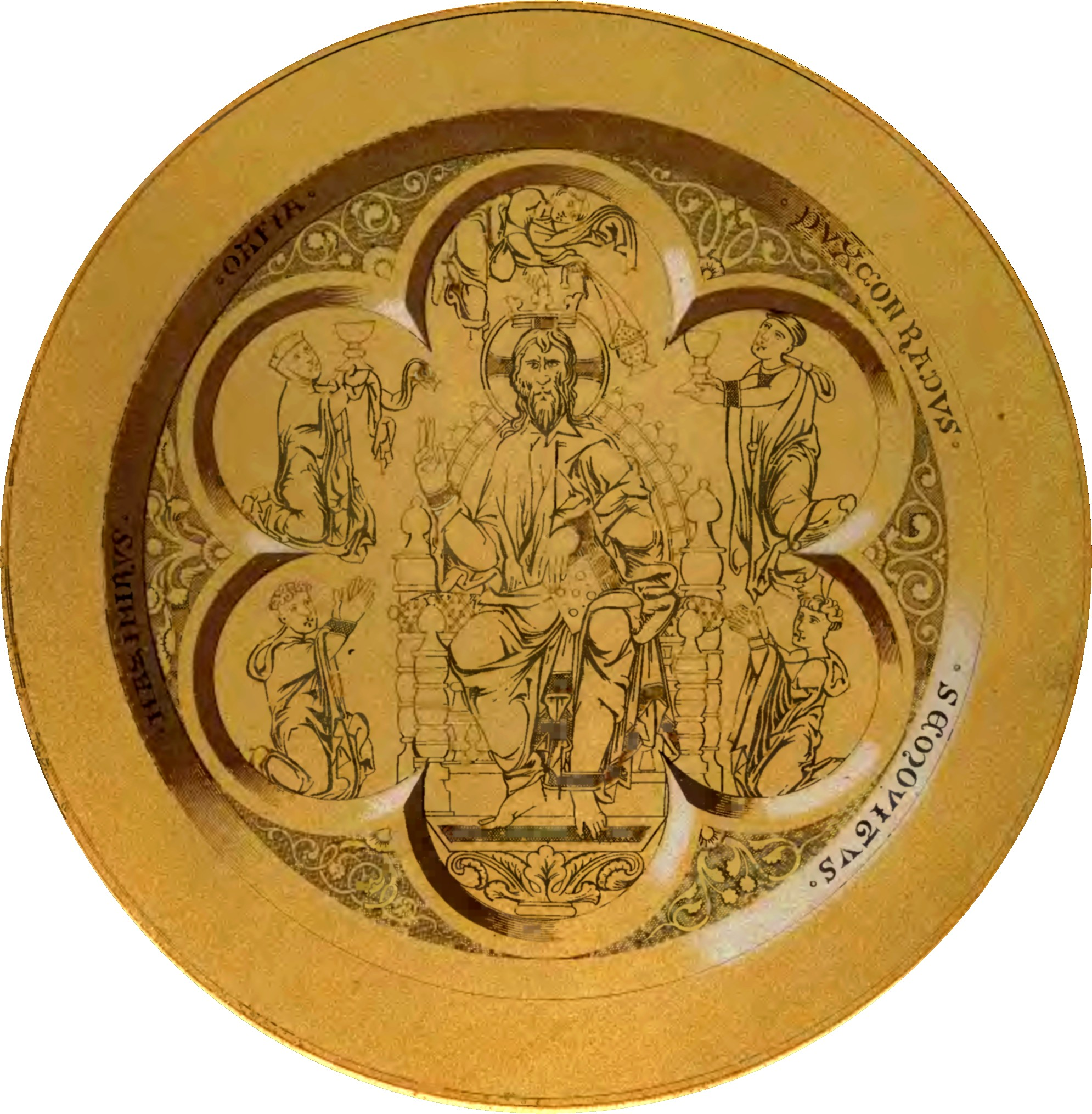
Chalice and paten of Konrad I, showing him and his family

Around 1208/1209 Konrad married Agafia of Rus, daughter of Prince Svyatoslav III Igorevich. They had ten children:

1. Bolesław I (c. 1210 – 17 April 1248), Duke of Masovia;
2. Casimir I (c. 1210/1213 – 14 December 1267), Duke of Kuyavia;
3. Siemowit I (c. 1215 – 24 June 1262), succeeded eldest brother as Duke of Masovia;
4. Eudoxia (b. c. 1215–1225), married Count Dietrich I of Brehna and Wettin;
5. Ludmila, probably a norbertine nun at Płock;
6. Ziemomysł (c. 1220 – 10 July/18 September 1241);
7. Salomea (c. 1220/1225 – aft. 30 August 1268?), probably a clare nun at Skała;
8. Judith (c. 1222/1227 – 4 December 1257/1263), married firstly to Duke Mieszko II the Fat of Opole, secondly to Duke Henry III the White of Wrocław;
9. Dubrawka (b. c. 1230, d. 1265);
10. Mieszko (bef. 1236 – bef. 1238), died in infancy.

== Konrad's legacy ==
Konrad is considered by Poles to be responsible for the Teutonic Knights' control of most of the Baltic coastline, undermining Polish authority in the area. King Casimir III of Poland had to accept the rule of the Order in Thorn and Kulm by the 1343 Treaty of Kalisz. After the Thirteen Years' War in 1466 Second Peace of Thorn, the Polish King Casimir IV Jagiellon gained control over the Chełmno Land as part of Royal Prussia.

== See also ==
- History of Poland (966–1385)

== Bibliography ==
- Bojtar, Endre (1999). Foreword to the Past: A Cultural History of the Baltic People. Central University Press.
- Boockmann, Hartmut (1992). Deutsche Geschichte im Osten Europas. Ostpreußen und Westpreußen (in German). Berlin.
- Bruce-Boswell, Alexander (1957). "Poland, 1050–1303". In Tanner, J. R.; Previte-Orton, C. W.; Brooke, Z. N. (eds.). The Cambridge Medieval History: Victory of the Papacy. Vol. 6. Cambridge University Press.
- Corwin, Edward Henry Lewinski (1917). The Political History of Poland. The Polish Book Importing Company.
- Jasiński, K. (2001). Rodowód Piastów małopolskich i kujawskich (in Polish). Wydawnictwo Historyczne.
- Maciorowski, Mirosław; Maciejewska, Beata (2018). Władcy Polski. Historia na nowo opowiedziana [Rulers of Poland. The history retold] (in Polish). Warszawa: Agora. ISBN 978-83-268-2720-4.
- Martin, Bernd (1998). Evangelische Akademie Baden (ed.). Masuren, Mythos und Geschichte (in German). Karlsruhe.
- Pollmann, Bernhard; Scheel, Walter (1989). Lesebuch zur deutschen Geschichte. Herausgegeben und bearbeitet (in German). Chronik Verlag.
- Rowell, S. C. (1994). Lithuania Ascending: A Pagan Empire within East-Central Europe, 1295-1345. Cambridge University Press.
- Urban, William (2003). The Teutonic Knights: A Military History. Greenhill.

Konrad I of Masovia House of Piast Born: 1187/1188 Died: 31 August 1247
Preceded by Leszek I the White	Duke of Masovia; 1194 – 1247	Succeeded by Bolesław I of Masovia
Preceded by Władysław III Spindleshanks	High Duke of Poland; 1229 – 1232	Succeeded by Henry I the Bearded
Preceded by Bolesław II the Horned	High Duke of Poland; 1241 – 1243	Succeeded by Bolesław V the Chaste
