= Cathedral of St. Michael the Archangel, Łomża =

Church in Łomża

Cathedral of Saints Michael the Archangel and John the Baptist
- Katedra śś. Michała Archanioła i Jana Chrzciciela
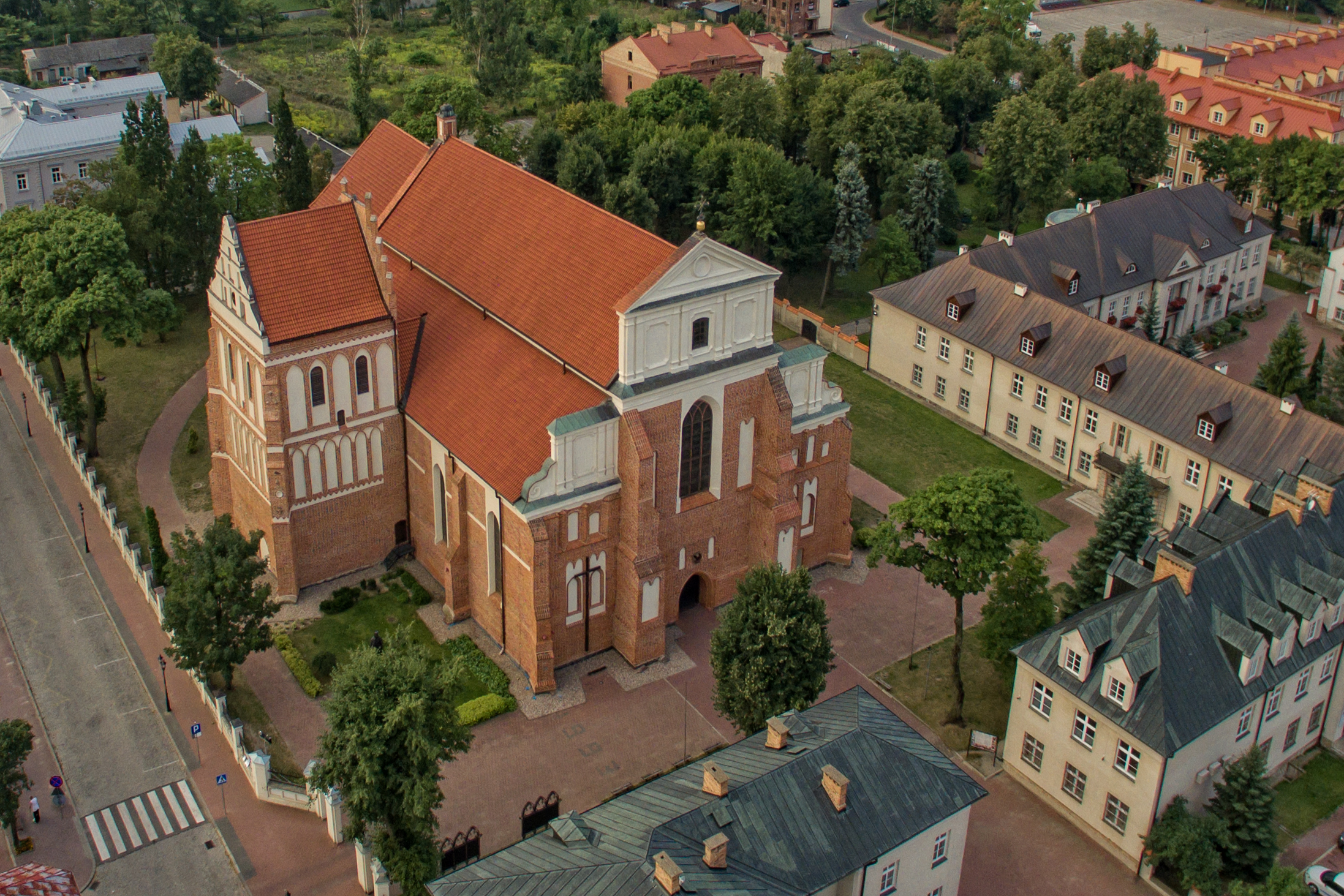
- (Credit: Arkadiusz Zarzecki)
- Cathedral of Saints Michael the Archangel and John the Baptist
- 53°10′39″N 22°04′47″E

History
- Founded: 1504

Architecture
- Style: Gothic
- Years built: 1504-1525
- Completed: 20th century

Specifications
- Materials: Brick

The Cathedral of Saints Michael the Archangel and John the Baptist is a gothic cathedral in Łomża, Poland. The history of the church dates to the 16th century, and it is a registered monument in Poland.

The church is known for its artistic significance which includes works by Italian sculptor Santi Gucci.

== History ==
The construction of the church began before 1504, funded by Duke Konrad III the Red, and was continued by Duchess Anna of Mazovia and her sons, Janusz and Stanisław. It is possible that the church was added to an already existing ducal chapel of St. Anne. After its consecration, the Łomża parish was transferred to the new church from the Church of the Dispersion of the Apostles (now non-existent, demolished in 1787).

In the years 1519–1526, the church was transformed from a three-aisled basilica into a pseudo-basilica. Around 1588, the Łomża starost Andrzej Dunin-Modliszewski converted the southern chapel into a family mausoleum. A fire broke out in the church in 1621. In the years 1691–1692, renovation and reconstruction works were carried out under the direction of Giuseppe Simone Belotti.

The church underwent numerous renovations in the 18th and 19th centuries, experiencing modifications of varying scope. In the years 1884–1886, a Neo-Gothic sacristy was added. In 1887, the porch at the base of the bell tower was transformed into the Chapel of St. Casimir, funded by Telesfor Starzeński. Between 1891 and 1894, a major renovation took place, including the execution of polychrome paintings by Aleksander Skiewski. Another restoration was carried out in the years 1932–1934 by Stefan Cybichowski. The church was damaged in 1939 and was renovated and restored after the war.

In 1925, papal bull Vixdum Poloniae unitas established the Diocese of Łomża, and the church became a cathedral. In 1991, Pope John Paul II gave a speech at the cathedral in Łomża.

== Architecture ==
The church has gone through many modifications throughout the centuries. The current vaulted church features a bell tower, six-sided altars, and is in the gothic style. The church also features a tomb from 1589 built by Santi Gucci for members of the Modliszowski family.

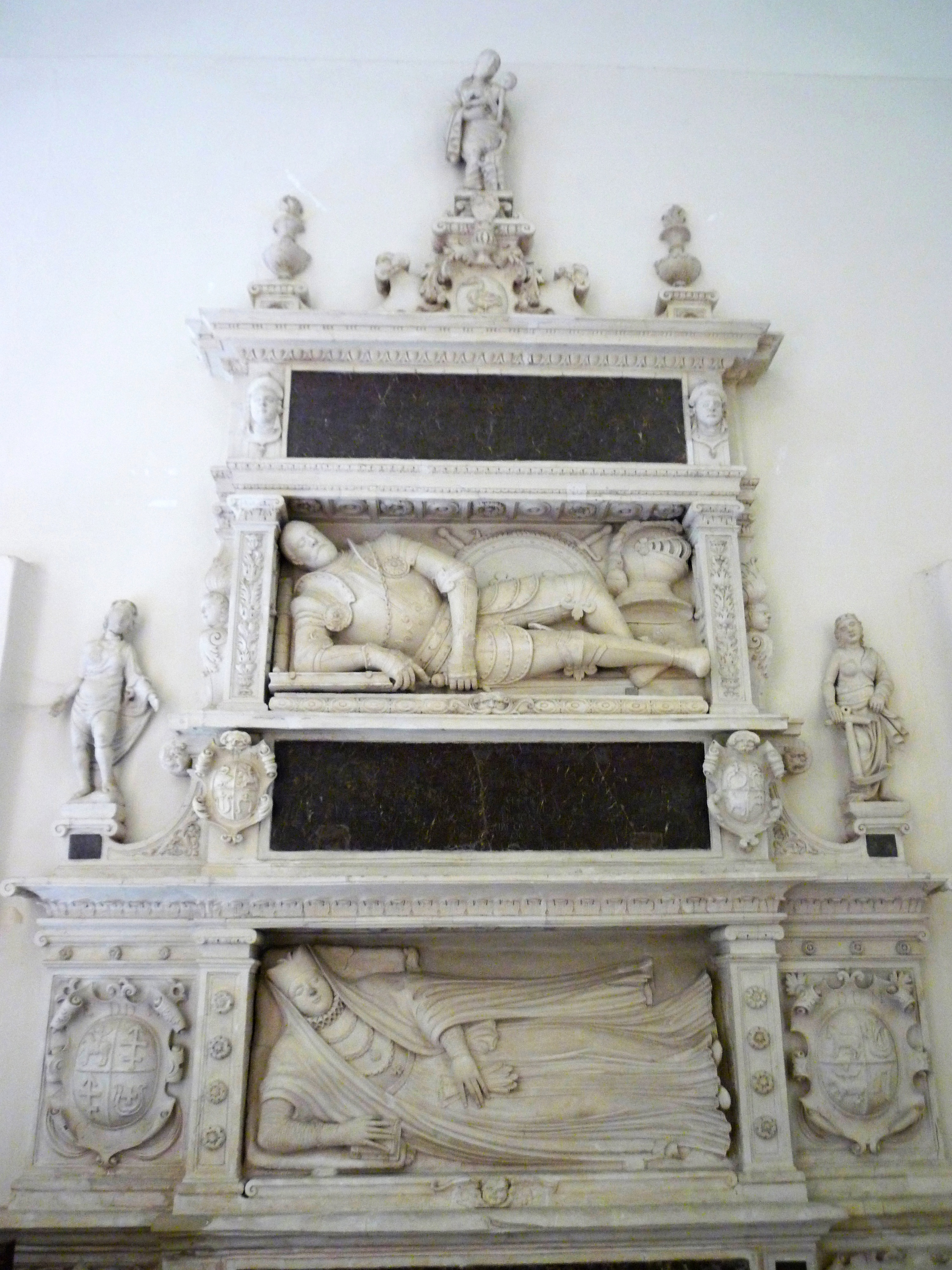
Modliszowski tomb, 1589, Santi Gucci

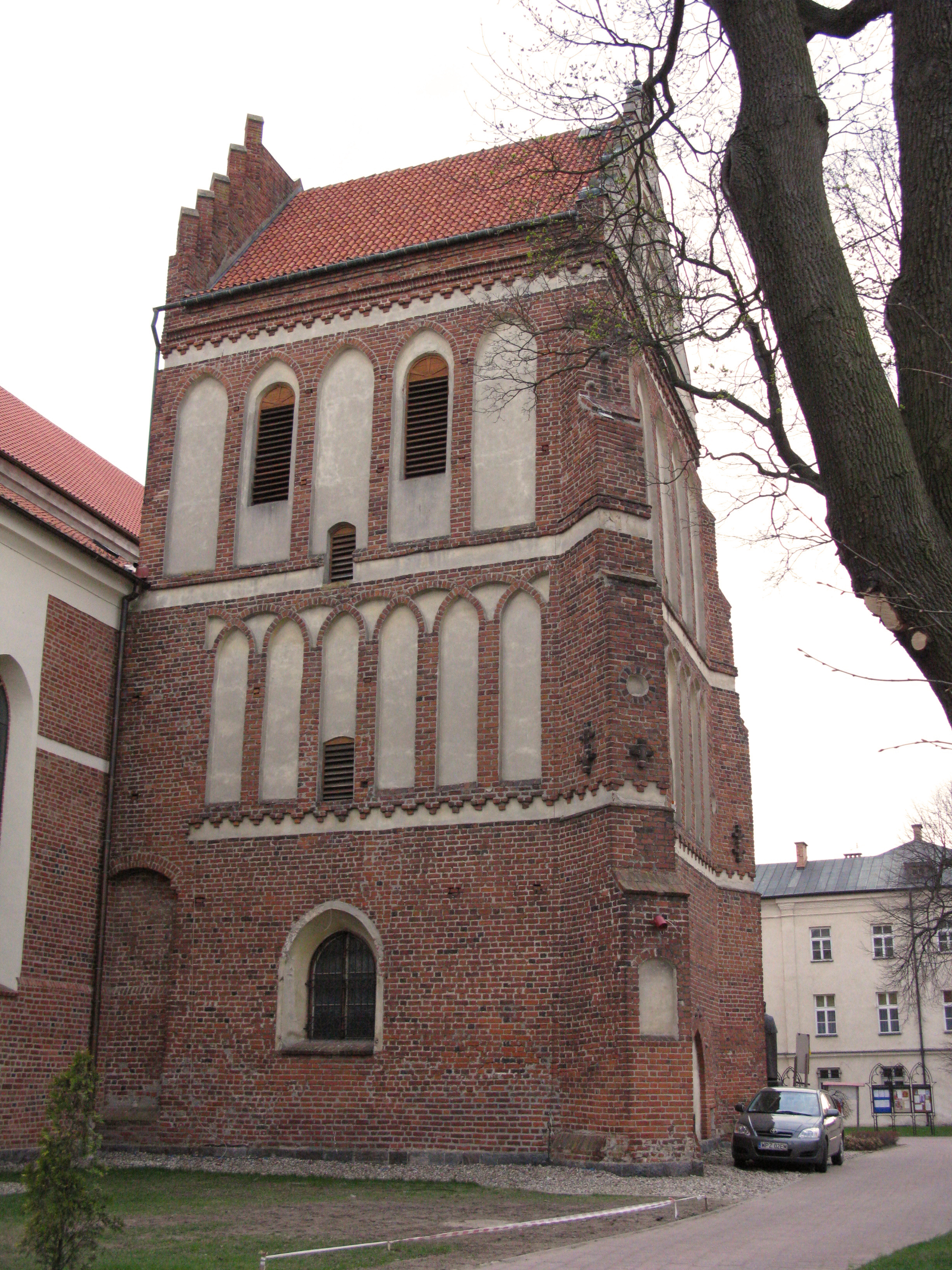
Bell tower

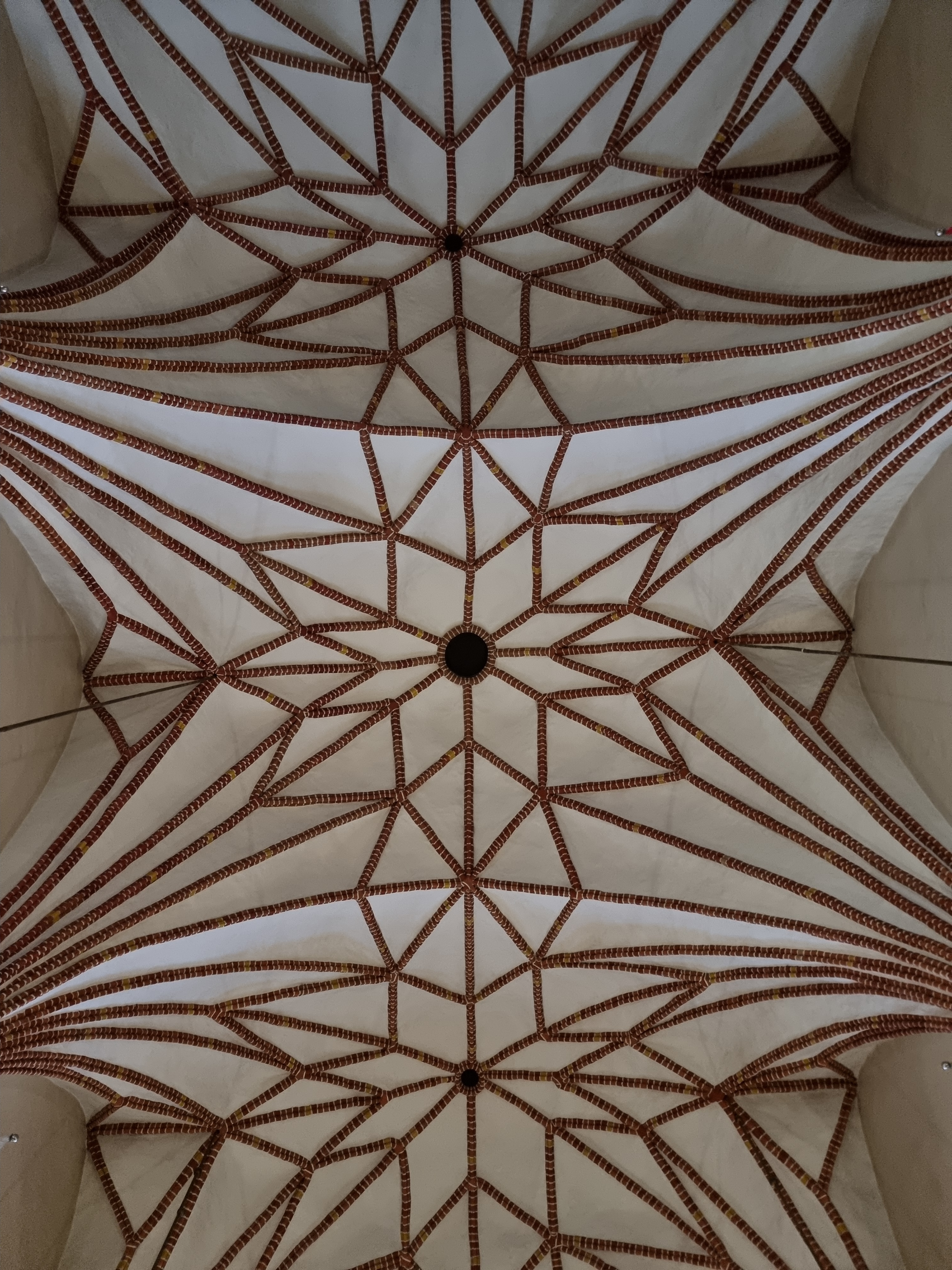
Brick-lined crystalline vault

== See also ==
- Gothic architecture in Poland

== Bibliography ==
- Kałamajska-Saeed, Maria (1982). "Kościół katedralny p. w. śś. Michała Archanioła i Jana Chrzciciela". Katalog Zabytków Sztuki w Polsce. IX (1). Warsaw: 18–32.
