= Konrad III Rudy =

Polish prince

- Duke of Masovia
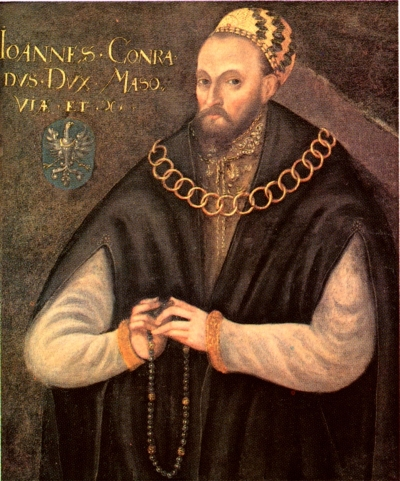
- Born: 1447/48
- Died: 28 October 1503 (aged 56-57); Osieck
- Buried: St. John's Archcathedral, Warsaw
- Noble family: House of Piast
- Spouses: Magdalena Stawrot (m. 1468; died 1470) N, daughter of Alexius (m. 1477–1493) Anna Radziwiłł (m. 1496)
- Issue: Sophia of Masovia; Anna of Masovia; Stanisław of Masovia; Janusz III of Masovia
- Father: Bolesław IV of Warsaw
- Mother: Barbara Olelkovna

Konrad III Rudy, also known in English as Konrad the Red (1447/48 – 28 October 1503), was a Polish prince and member of the Piast dynasty in the Masovian branch. He was a duke of Czersk, Liw, Warsaw, Nur, Łomża, Ciechanów, Różan, Zakroczym and Wyszogród during 1454-1471 jointly with his brothers (under regency until 1462), Duke of Płock, Wizna, Płońsk and Zawkrze during 1462-1471, and after the division of the paternal domains in 1471, sole ruler over Czersk and Liw, over Wyszogród during 1474-1489 and again in 1495, over Zakroczym since 1484, over Nur since 1488 and over Warsaw since 1489.

He was the third son of Bolesław IV of Warsaw and Barbara Olelkovna, daughter of Kievan duke Olelko Volodymyrovych). The premature death of his two older brothers during 1453-1454 left him as the eldest surviving son of his family.

== Life ==
After the death of his father on 10 September 1454, Konrad III and his younger siblings were placed under the guardianship of their mother Barbara and Paweł Giżycki, Bishop of Płock. The regency ended in 1462, when Konrad III attained his majority and became in the legal guardian of his younger brothers.

At the beginning of 1462 arrived the news of the deaths of the neighboring Dukes of Płock, Siemowit VI and Władysław II without heirs. Konrad III, as the closest male relative and hoping to reunite the whole Masovian lands, immediately assumed the title of Duke of Płock. Unfortunately, King Casimir IV also put his claims over the lands, under the excuse of being the Polish sovereign they had to reverted to the crown. He soon occupied Belz, Rawa Mazowiecka and Gostynin, who were formally added to the kingdom; however, the Thirteen Years' War and the fear of an intervention of the Teutonic Knights, united with the disapproval of the Masovian nobility over the too aggressive politics of the Casimir IV, forced him to accept temporarily the rule of Konrad III over Płock, Płońsk and Zawkrze —although the major support of Konrad III was Princess Catherine of Płock, aunt of the late dukes, whose energetic attitude played a major part in the conflict.

The formal recognition of Konrad III as Duke of Płock, however, didn't end his struggle with the Polish kingdom for this land. In November 1462 the duke was obliged to presented himself at Piotrków Trybunalski, where he appeared before the royal court led by the Voivode of Kalisz, Stanisław Ostroróg. The verdict of the court could be easily predicted and on 25 November the outraged duke left the place of the meeting, where was confirmed the incorporation of Rawa Mazowiecka, Gostynin and Belz to the crown, and also stipulated that all the inheritance of Siemowit VI and Władysław II shared the same fate. For unknown reasons, despite confirmations of a judgment in the following years, Casimir IV didn't exercise his rights over Płock, who remained in the hands of the Piast princes (however, in 1476 Konrad III was forced to accept the annexation by the crown of the town of Sochaczew, who belonged to Anna of Oleśnica, widow of Władysław I, as a part of her Qprawa wdowia).

Not wanting to risk his whole inheritance if he should lose the royal favor, Konrad III decided to support the crown during his war against the Teutonic Order, sending auxiliary troops in 1464 during the siege of Działdowo.

The majority of his younger brothers forced Konrad III to make a division of their paternal domains on 3 April 1471. As the older brother, he choose first and decided to take Czersk and Liw. This wasn't the final distribution, because in 1474 Konrad III was able to obtain the district of Wyszogród from his brother Casimir III and ten years later (1484) he also took Zakroczym from his other brother Bolesław V.

On 27 April 1488 Bolesław V, Duke of Warsaw and Nur died without issue. According to earlier agreements, Konrad III inherited Warsaw; however, for unknown reasons, the local townspeople refused to accept him, and called his youngest brother Janusz II to be their ruler. One year later, Konrad III made an agreement with Janusz II, and gave to him the district of Wyszogród in exchange of Warsaw, and in this way the whole inheritance of Bolesław V remained in the hands of Konrad III.

Being the Jagiellonian dynasty a constant threat to the Masovian princes, Konrad III tried to limit his contacts with countries hostile to the Kingdom of Poland, like the Teutonic Knights, and even Moscow. However, this didn't avoided another dispute, when after the death of Janusz II on 16 February 1495, his Duchy of Płock was claimed by John I Albert, son and successor of Casimir IV.

Initially Konrad III didn't give up to his rights and instantly locked himself in Płock. John I Albert, in contrast to his father, refused to lose the battle and in August 1495 Polish troops reached Płock; Konrad III, watching the impossibility to resist, decided to give up. The successful incorporation of Płock to the Polish kingdom, however, wasn't enough for John I Albert, who in February 1496 ordered Konrad III to present himself at Piotrków Trybunalski, where he was further humiliated by paying homage to the king for his lands, who after his death would be incorporated to the crown; only the district of Czersk was granted to him as hereditary domain for his descent.

The events of Piotrków Trybunalski limited the internal policy of Konrad III, because from then forward, every nobleman who had a conflict with the duke would be expected to receive the support of the king. In 1501 the senate of the kingdom almost deprived Konrad III from all his power, when in a controversial ruling certain noble received lands in perpetuity as a payment for some offences inflicted by the duke. Only the death of John I Albert and the ensuing chaos after this caused that this ruling would be exercised.

Konrad III died on 28 October 1503 in Osieck and was buried in St. John's Archcathedral, Warsaw.

== Marriages and issue ==
Between 13 June 1468 and 1470, Konrad III married firstly with Magdalena (d. bef. 1476/77), a daughter of Stanisław Stawrot, a citizen of Kraków, perhaps identical to Stanisław of Stawiszyn, a Brewmaster mentioned in the mid-15th-century chronicles. She was also probably married previously with certain Simon, also a brewer in Kraków who signed some town charters around 1476; if this is true, she certainly divorced him in order to marry the duke, and this also supposed that she could have been his mistress before their wedding. The previous thoughts that connected the marriage with the purchase of Kamienica (en: Tenement) in Kraków, were refuted by recent historiography. Because for the low origins of the bride, the marriage was morganatic and any children born from them had no rights of inheritance. She died after a few years of childless union; according to Jan Długosz, Konrad III gave her a princely funeral, despite her low-born status. She was probably buried in one of the most important churches of Kraków or Masovia.

Before 20 July 1477, Konrad III married secondly with a daughter of a citizen called Alexius. Nothing more is known about her. By 22 February 1493 the childless union ended, either by her repudiation or death.

Between 29 September 1496 and 25 January 1497, Konrad III married thirdly with Anna (ca. 1476 - 14/15 March 1522), a daughter of Mikolaj Radziwiłł the Old, Voivod of Vilnius and the first Grand Chancellor of Lithuania. They had four children:

- Sophia (1497/98 - bef. 11 March 1543), married firstly ca. 1521 to Stephen VII Báthory and secondly aft. 1530 to Ludwig Pekri. Sophia and Stephen were the grandparents of Elizabeth Báthory.
- Anna (1498/99 – aft. 26 January 1557), married in February 1536 to Stanisław Odrowąż of Sprowy.
- Stanisław (17 May 1501 – 8 August 1524).
- Janusz III (ca. 27 September 1502 – 9/10 March 1526).

In addition, Konrad III had four illegitimate children with two known mistresses:

With Dorota Kozłowa Aksamitowa (d. aft 27 December 1537), from Warsaw, he had two sons: Stanisław and another whose name is unknown (although probably was named Wojciech), both born between 1480-1495. Nothing more is known about them, except that they were probably dead by the 1520s.

With Anna Łoska (d. aft. 13 June 1520), probably a noble lady, he had two children: a son Hieronim (also named Jarosz; ca. 1487 - ca. 21 April 1527), who became a priest and altarista at St. John's Archcathedral, and a daughter, Anna Dorota (d. ca. 1540), wife of Jan Warszewicki, a Podsędek at Czersk.
