= Anna Radziwiłł (died 1522) =

Lithuanian noblewoman

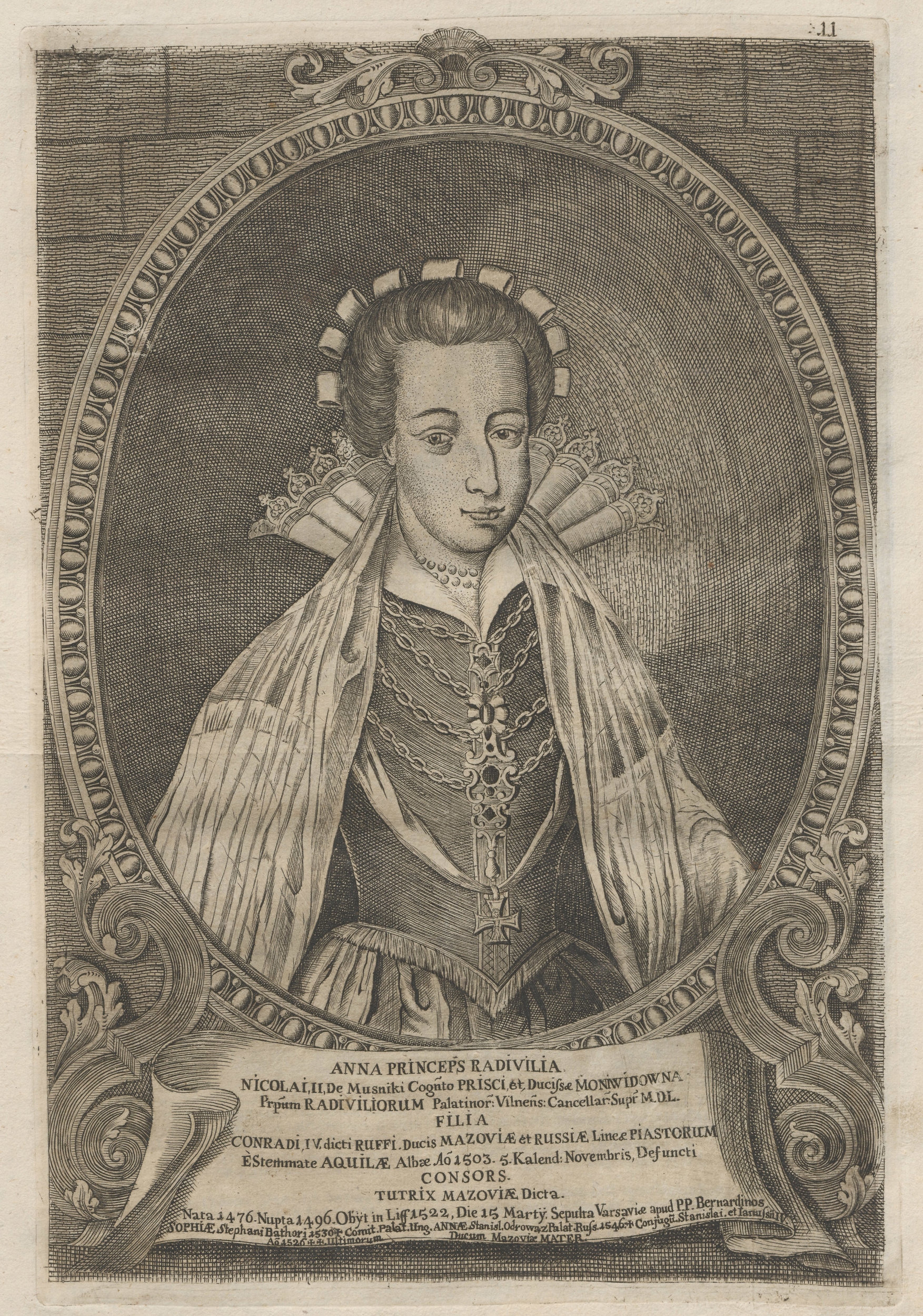
- Born: 1475 or 1476; Vilnius, Lithuania
- Died: 15 March 1522 (aged 47/46); Liw, Poland
- Noble family: Radziwiłł family (by birth); House of Piast (by marriage)
- Spouse: Konrad III Rudy
- Issue: with Konrad III Rudy: Sophia of Masovia; Anna of Masovia; Stanisław of Masovia; Janusz III of Masovia
- Father: Mikalojus Radvila the Old
- Mother: Sofija Ona Manvydaitė

Anna Radziwiłł (Lithuanian: Ona Radvilaitė) (1475 or 1476 – 15 March 1522) was a Lithuanian noble woman and Duchess of Masovia.

She was the daughter of Mikalojus Radvila the Old (Mikołaj Radziwiłł Stary) and his first wife, Zofia Moniwidówna. She was born in 1475 or 1476. and was a member of the Lithuanian Radziwiłł family.

Anna was married to Konrad III Rudy of the Masovian Piast dynasty between 29 September 1496 and 2 April 1497.

She died on 15 March 1522. She was buried in the cloister of Bernardin's in Warsaw.

She is one of the characters on the famous painting by Jan Matejko, Prussian Homage.

She was the great-grandmother of Elizabeth Báthory.
