= Janusz of Masovia =

Janusz of Masovia might refer to these dukes:

- Janusz I of Warsaw (ca. 1347/1352 – 1429), son of Siemowit III
- Janusz II of Masovia (1455–1495), son of Bolesław IV
- Janusz III of Masovia (1502–1526), son of Konrad III Rudy, last male of the Masovian Piast dynasty
