= Mazowiecki =

Mazowiecki (feminine: Mazowiecka) an adjective meaning "of Masovia" in Polish. It is translated into English as Masovian. The surname Mazowiecki or Mazowiecka may refer to:

- Konrad I Mazowiecki (ca. 1187/88–1247), High Duke of Poland from the Polish Piast dynasty, the sixth Duke of Masovia and Kuyavia
- Stanisław Mazowiecki (1501–1524), Polish prince member of the House of Piast in the Masovian branch, Grand Chancellor of Lithuania
- Tadeusz Mazowiecki (1927–2013), Polish prime minister, one of the leaders of the Solidarity movement
