= King Stanisław =

King Stanisław can refer to:

- Stanisław Leszczyński
- Stanisław August Poniatowski

== See also ==
- Stanisław of Masovia (1501–1524)
