= Jan Krzysztof Tarnowski =

Polish nobleman (1537–1657)

- Count
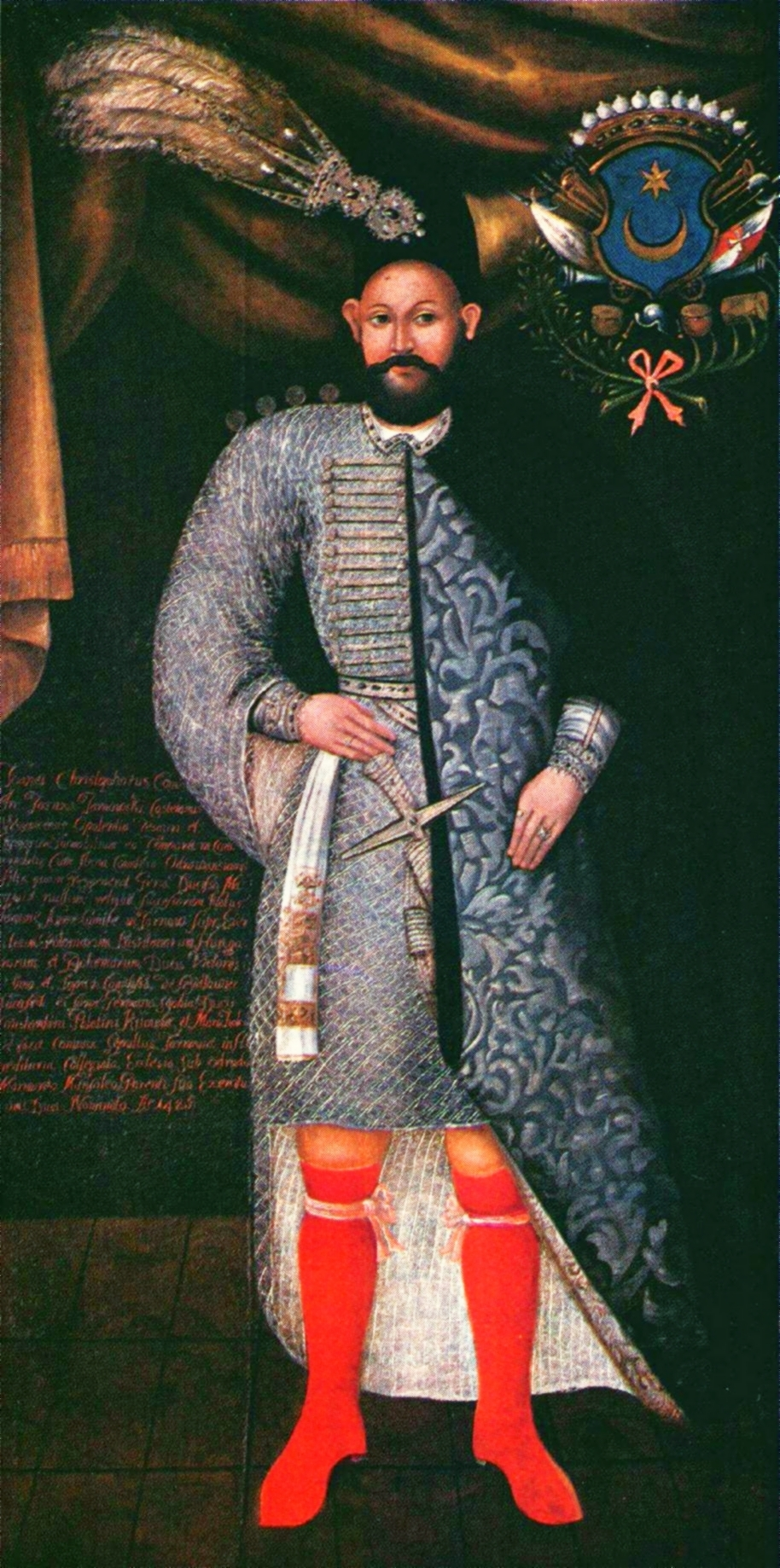
- Coat of arms: Leliwa
- Born: 1 January 1537
- Died: 1 April 1567; Gorliczyn
- Family: Tarnowski
- Consort: Zofia Odrowąż
- Father: Jan Tarnowski
- Mother: Zofia Szydłowiecka

Count Jan Krzysztof Tarnowski (1 January 1537 – 1 April 1567) was a Polish nobleman (szlachcic), Leliwa coat of arms. He was a son of Hetman Jan Tarnowski and Zofia (née Szydłowiecka). He was married to Zofia Odrowąż since 1555, but had no issue.

== Life ==
He was educated in the worldly affairs at the court of Ferdinand I, Holy Roman Emperor, at his father's great expense claimed Orzechowski.

He was owner of Tarnów, Wiewiórka, Przeworsk, Rożnów and Stare Sioło.

He was a secretary of King Sigismund II Augustus since 1554 and held the offices of castellan of Wojnicz, and starost of Sandomierz, Stryj, and Dolina. Poor health disallowed Jan Krzysztof to have a substantial career in the military, Niesiecki said: "King was shoving a lesser military command to him during the Muscovy war (Northern Seven Years' War), but his health weak due to consumption prevented him from achieving knightly deeds."

He died prematurely, most likely to the ravages of tuberculosis, and was buried next to his father, Piotr Skarga presided over his funeral at Tarnów. His death marked the end of the Tarnów line of the Tarnowski family clan.

== Legacy ==
The poet Jan Kochanowski dedicated his poem Chess to him.
