= St. John's Archcathedral, Warsaw =

St John's Archcathedral
- Archcathedral Basilica of St. John the Baptist
- Bazylika archikatedralna św. Jana Chrzciciela
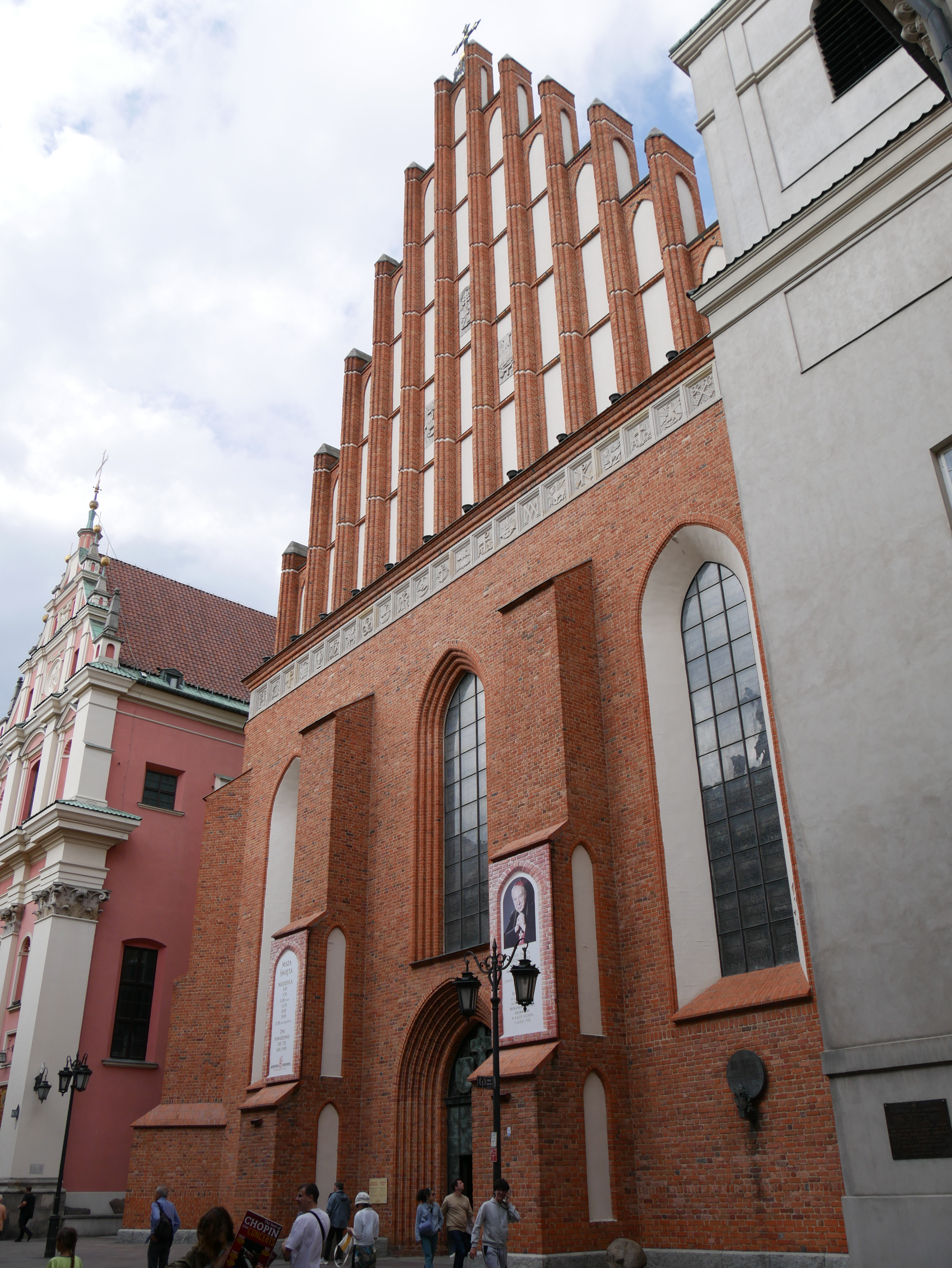
- Main façade
- St John's Archcathedral
- 52°14′56″N 21°00′49″E
- Location: Warsaw
- Country: Poland
- Language: Polish
- Denomination: Catholic Church

History
- Status: Archcathedral
- Founded: 1390
- Dedication: John the Baptist

Architecture
- Functional status: Active
- Style: Brick Gothic

Administration
- Archdiocese: Warsaw

Clergy
- Archbishop: Kazimierz Nycz

UNESCO World Heritage Site
- Type: Cultural
- Criteria: ii, vi
- Designated: 1980
- Part of: Historic Centre of Warsaw
- Reference no.: 30bis

Historic Monument of Poland
- Designated: 1994-09-08
- Part of: Warsaw – historic city center with the Royal Route and Wilanów
- Reference no.: M.P. 1994 nr 50 poz. 423

St John's Archcathedral (Polish: Archikatedra św. Jana w Warszawie) is a Catholic church within the Old Town precinct in Warsaw, Poland. The Brick Gothic structure stands on Świętojańska Street, adjacent to the Jesuit Church. St John's is one of three major cathedrals in the city, but it is the only temple that also possesses the title of an archcathedral. It is the mother church of the Archdiocese of Warsaw and one of Poland's national pantheons. Along with the old town, the church has been listed by UNESCO as a World Heritage Site.

== History ==
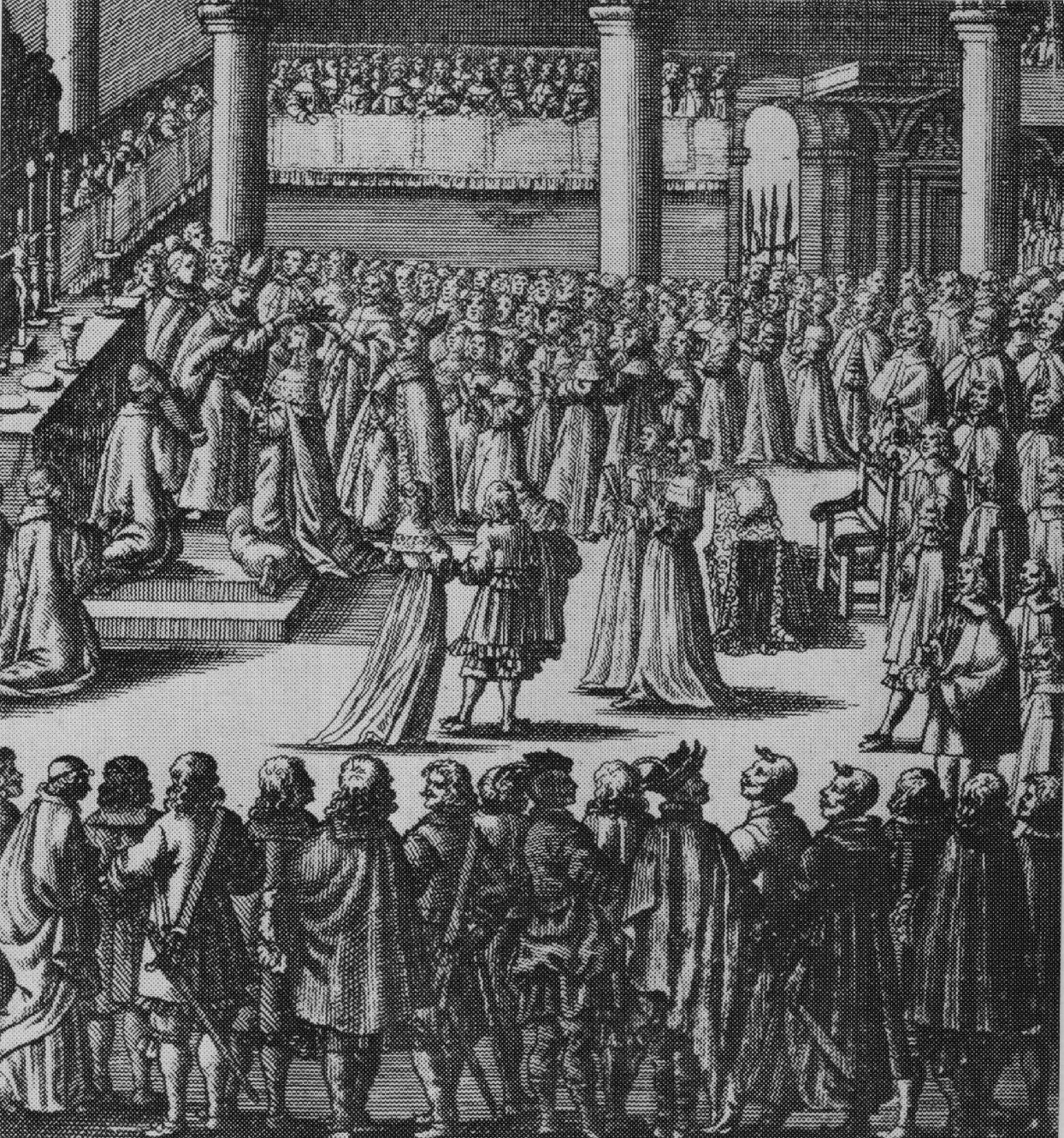
Coronation of Queen Eleonora in St John's Cathedral in 1670.

Originally built in the 14th century in Masovian Gothic style, the cathedral served as a coronation and burial site for numerous Dukes of Masovia.

The archcathedral was connected with the Royal Castle by an elevated 80-meter-long corridor that had been built by Queen Anna Jagiellon in the late 16th century and extended in the 1620s after Michał Piekarski's failed 1620 attempt to assassinate King of Poland Sigismund III in front of the cathedral.

In the 18th century, an Armenian Catholic chapel was organized at the church, after Warsaw experienced an influx of Armenians, fleeing Podolia since the Polish–Ottoman War of 1672–1676 (see also: Armenians in Poland).

After the resolution of the Constitution of May 3, 1791, at the end of the session at the Royal Castle, King Stanisław August Poniatowski went to the Cathedral of St John to repeat the Oath of the Constitution in front of the Altar, in the face of God. Also the Marshals of the Great Sejm was carried to the archcathedral on the shoulders of the enthusiastic deputies of the Sejm.

In 1798 Warsaw became the seat of a new Diocese (Archdiocese after 1818) and the church became a Cathedral.

The church was modified several times, most notably in the 19th century, it was preserved until World War II as an example of Gothic Revival.

In 1944, during the Warsaw Uprising (August–October 1944), the cathedral was a place of struggle between insurgents and advancing German army. The Germans managed to induct a tank loaded with explosives into the cathedral, a huge explosion destroyed large part of the building. After the collapse of the Uprising, German Vernichtungskommando (Destruction Detachment) drilled holes into the walls for explosives and blew up the cathedral destroying 90% of its walls.

The cathedral was rebuilt after the war. The exterior reconstruction is based on the 14th-century church's presumed appearance (according to an early-17th-century Hogenberg illustration and a 1627 Abraham Boot drawing), not on its prewar appearance.

== Interior ==
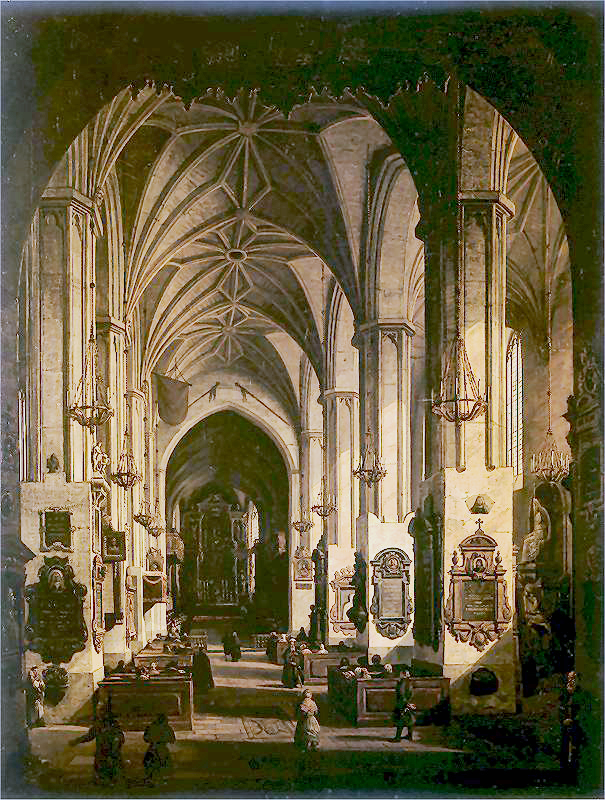
Interior of cathedral, 1836, by Marcin Zaleski

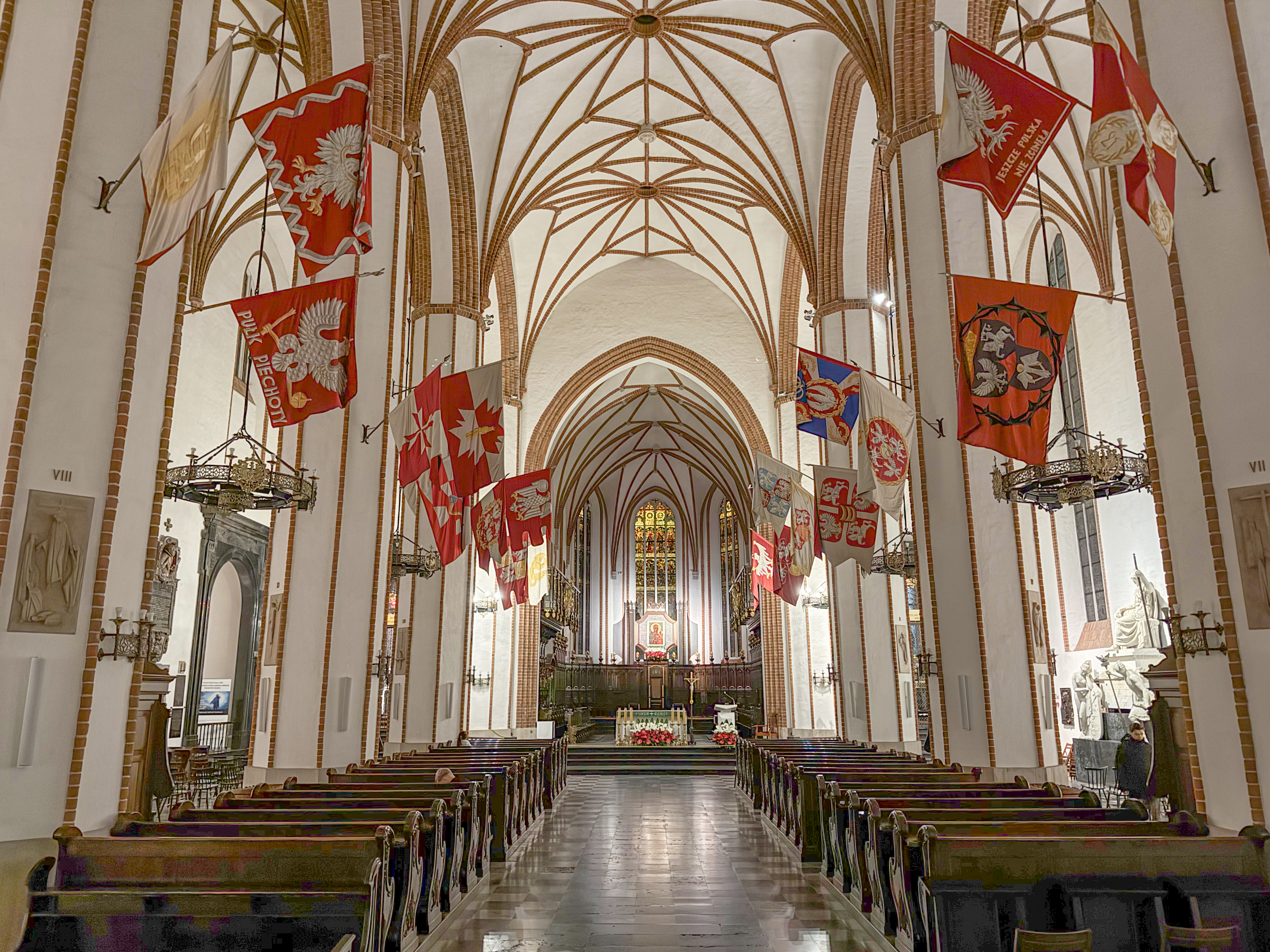
Interior of cathedral, 2025

The profuse Early Baroque decoration inside from the beginning of the 17th century and magnificent painting on the main altar by Palma il Giovane depicting Virgin and Child with St. John the Baptist and St. Stanisław were destroyed in German bombing of the church on August 17, 1944. The remains of the church were blown up by the Germans in November 1944. One wall that somehow managed to survive was all that was left of the six-hundred-year-old edifice. This devastation of a Polish national monument was a part of the Planned destruction of Warsaw, which had officially begun after the collapse of the Warsaw Uprising.

The painting of the Virgin and Child was created in 1618 for King Sigismund III Vasa especially to place on the central altar of the St John's Cathedral. As a masterpiece it was confiscated on Napoleon's order and transported to Paris. It was retrieved by Warsaw authorities in 1820s after the Congress of Vienna. It survived many wars and the bombing of Warsaw since it was painted, but did not survive World War II. Among the sculptures lost due to German bombardment, the most worthy of mentioning was a marble bust of Jan Franciszek Bieliński, voivode of Malbork (died 1685), carved by Jean-Joseph Vinache.

The interior reconstruction design considerably differed from the pre-war cathedral, taking it back in time to its raw Gothic look, because very little of the cathedral's original furnishings has been preserved. The cathedral is a three-nave building, two aisles are the same height as the main nave. On the right side from the front a belfry is situated, a passage to Dziekania Street is situated underneath it. There is a pulpit from 1959, designed by Józef Trenarowski and stalls which are a replica of the destroyed baroque ones, founded by King John III Sobieski. Moreover, there are many chapels, gravestones and epitaphs in the cathedral. By the left aisle are numerous chapels. They are, in turn, from the main altar:

- Baryczka Chapel, at the end of the left aisle (it contains a wooden crucifix, regarded as the most precious element of the cathedral's furnishings; it was brought from Nuremberg in 1539 by the merchant Jerzy Baryczka),
- The Chapel of Whipped Christ (the oldest chapel, it dates back to 15th century)
- The Baptistery (with a valuable baptismal, which dates back to 1631)
- The Chapel of John the Baptist
- Saint Stanisław Chapel, from 15th century
- Among the reconstructed elements of the original interior is the rococo altar in the Chapel of the Immaculate Conception, the so-called Literary Chapel, with an effigy of the Virgin Mary from the destroyed St Andrew's Church at the Theatre Square, dating back to the 17th century.

The painting that once belonged to the Polish kings John II Casimir Vasa, Michael Korybut Wiśniowiecki and John III Sobieski, was used during the battles.

== Burials ==
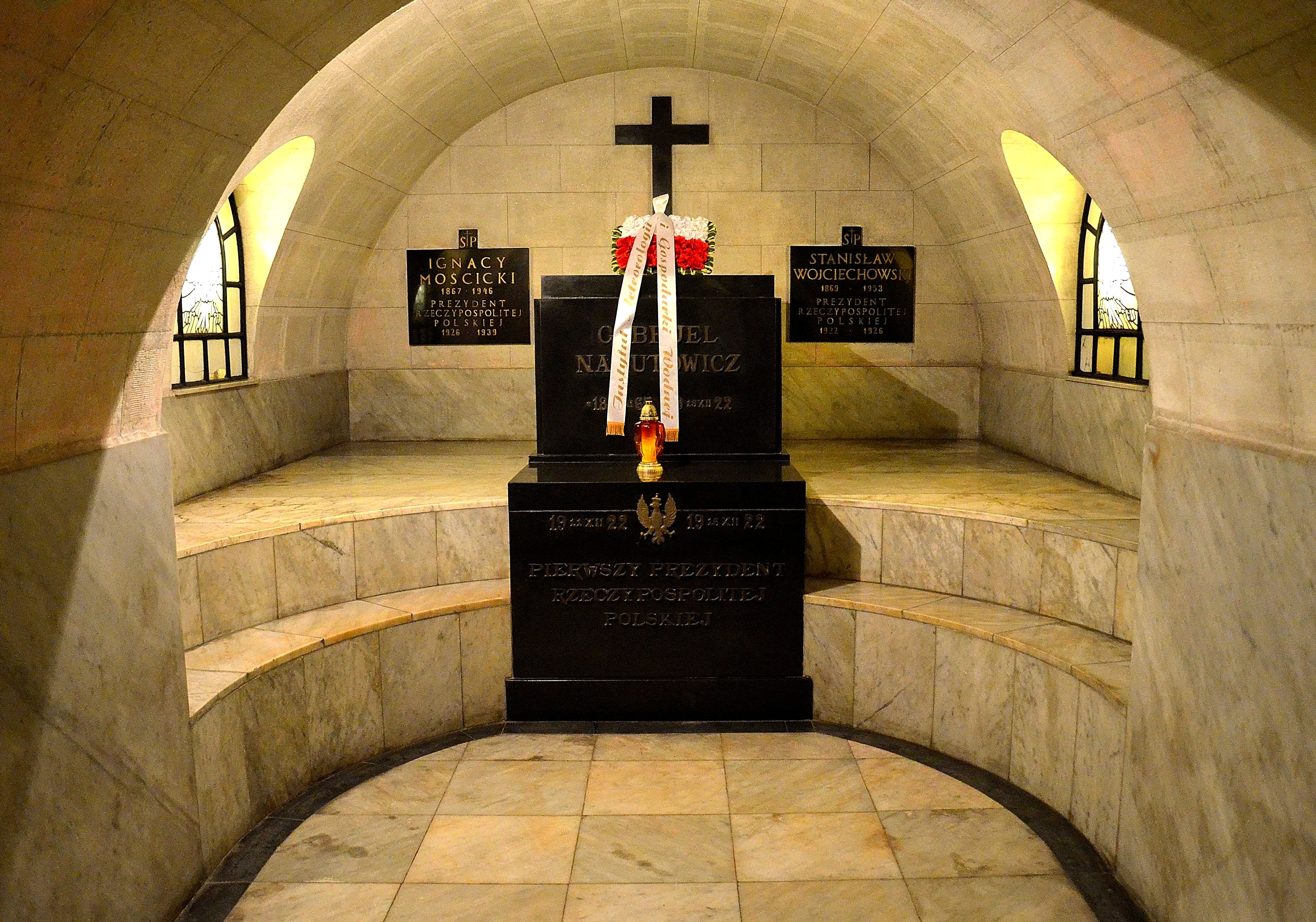
Presidential burials (Second Polish Republic)

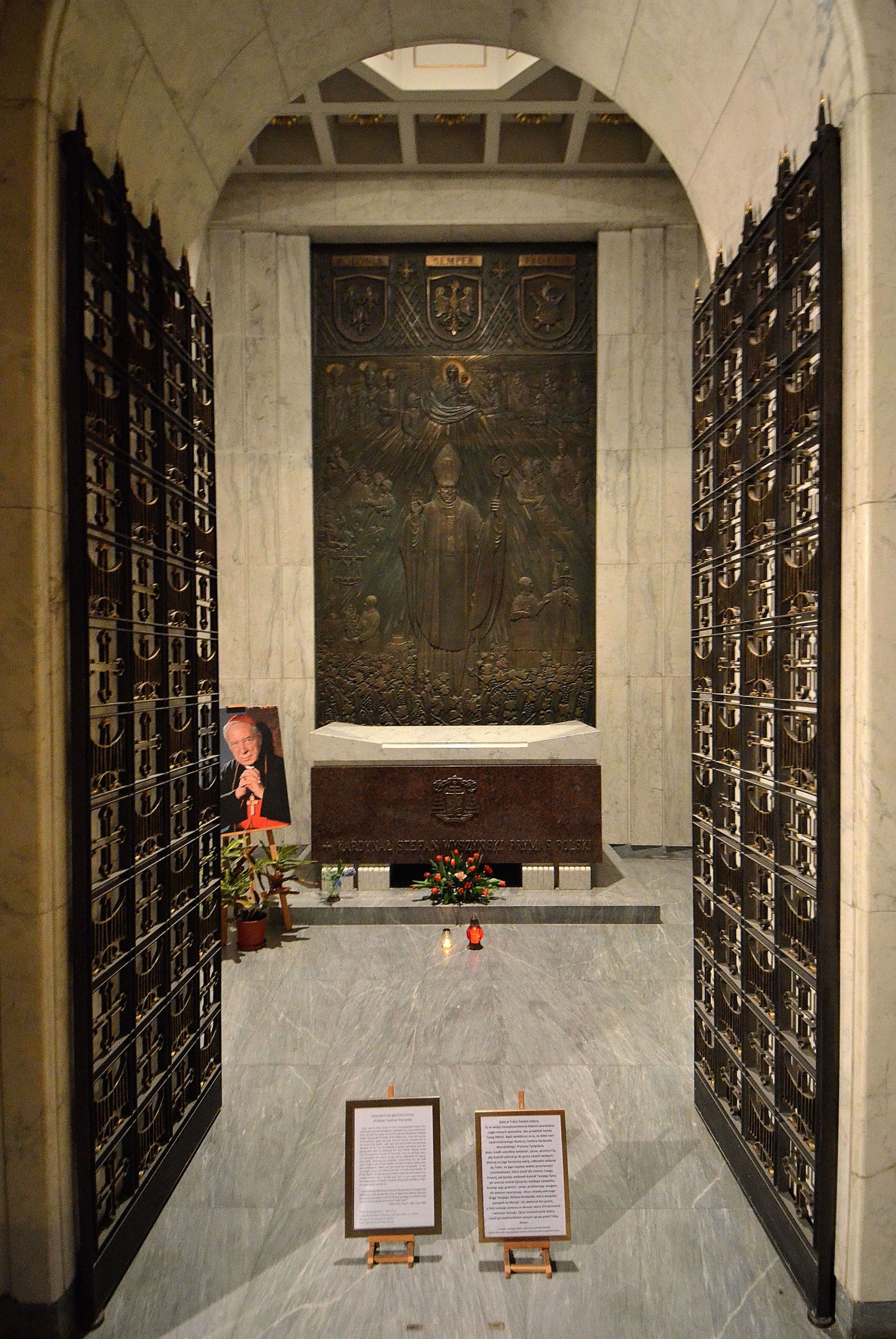
Mausoleum of Cardinal Wyszyński in St John's Archcathedral

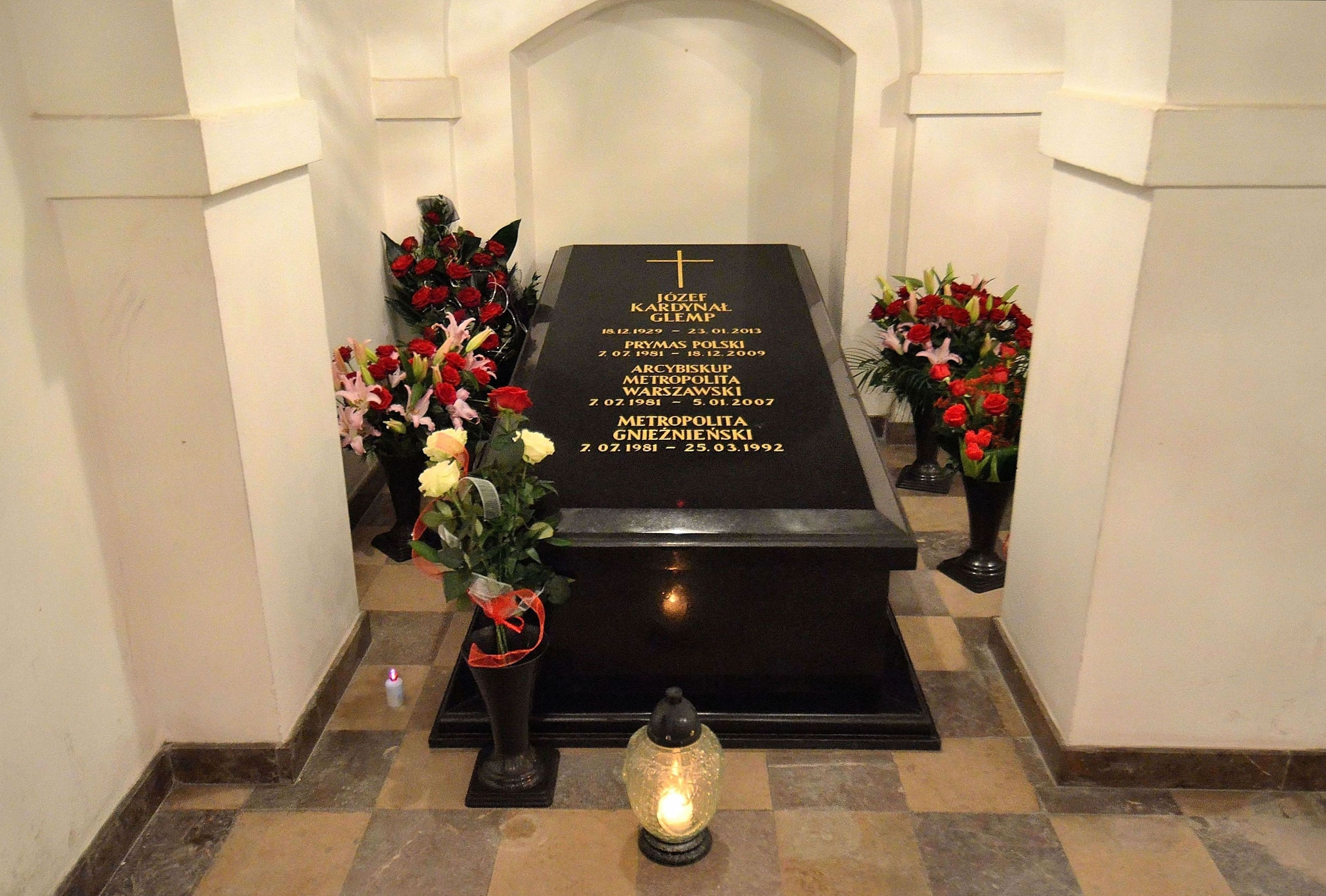
Tomb of Cardinal Glemp in St John's Archcathedral

The crypts beneath the main aisle hold the remains of notable persons, including:

- Dukes of Masovia:
  - Stanisław
  - Janusz III
- King Stanisław August Poniatowski, the last Polish monarch
- Adam Kazanowski
- composers and musicians of the Royal Cappella Vasa, e.g. Asprillo Pacelli, whose magnificent black-marble epitaph with composer's bust was reconstructed after the war
- statesman Stanisław Małachowski, whose white-marble monument was designed by Bertel Thorvaldsen (destroyed, August 21, 1944, when a German tank filled with explosives struck the cathedral's southern wall; reconstructed, 1965)
- painter Marcello Bacciarelli
- writer Henryk Sienkiewicz
- presidents of Poland:
  - Gabriel Narutowicz
  - Ignacy Mościcki
- prime minister and composer Ignacy Jan Paderewski
- General Kazimierz Sosnkowski
- primates:
  - August Hlond
  - Józef Glemp
  - Stefan Wyszyński

== Gallery ==
=== Historic images ===
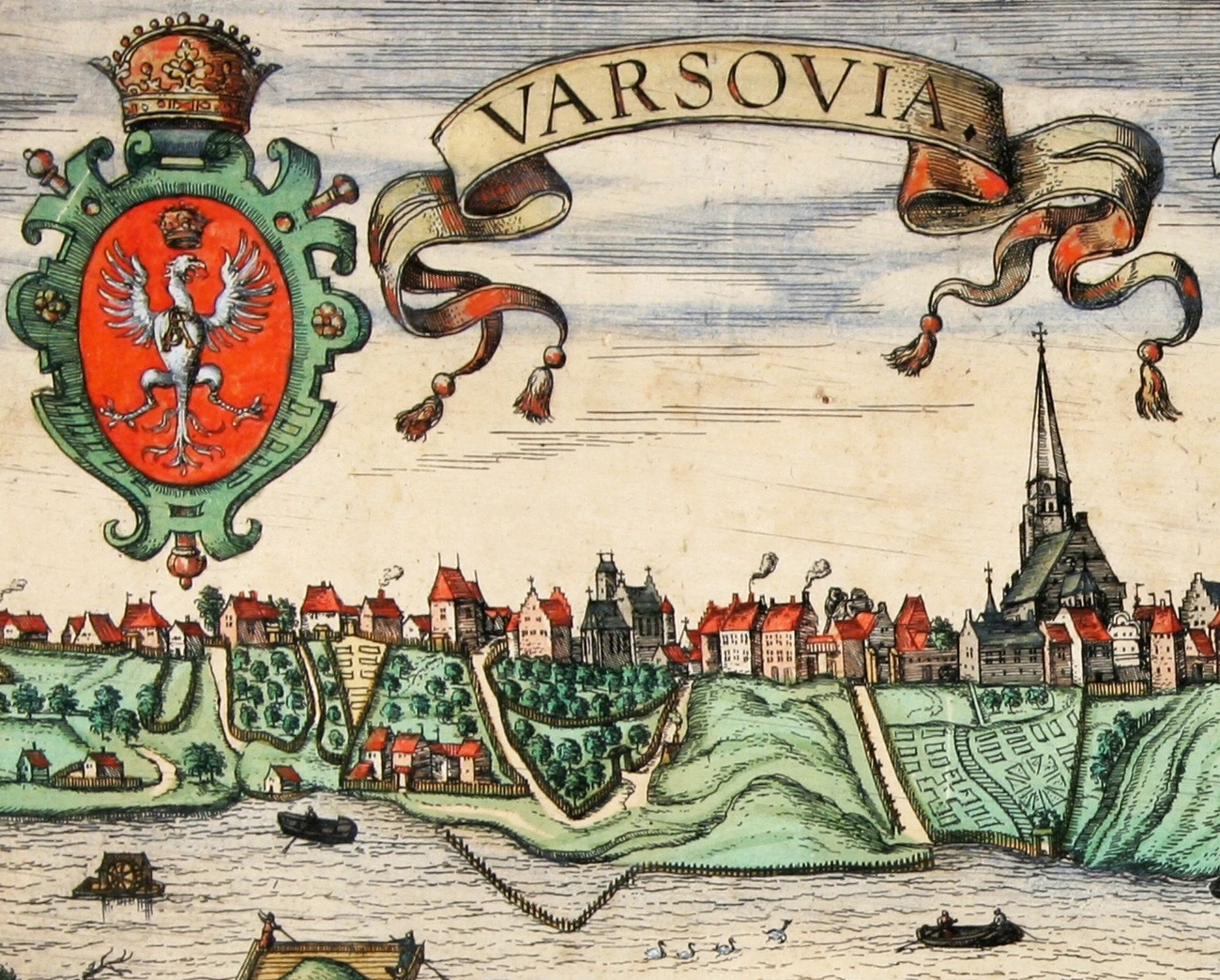
Warsaw, late 16th century, by Frans Hogenberg.

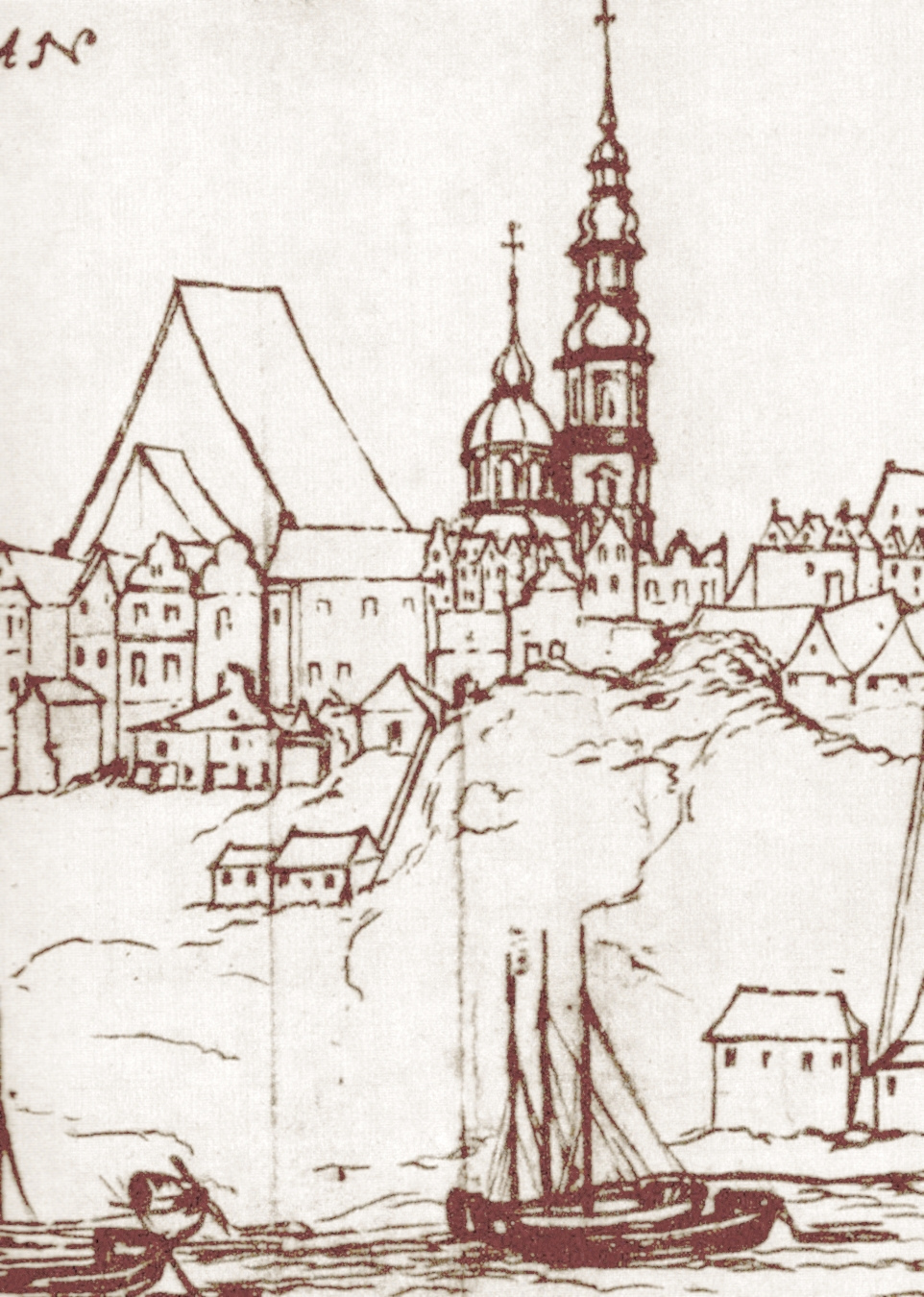
St John's Cathedral (left) and Jesuit Church, 1627.

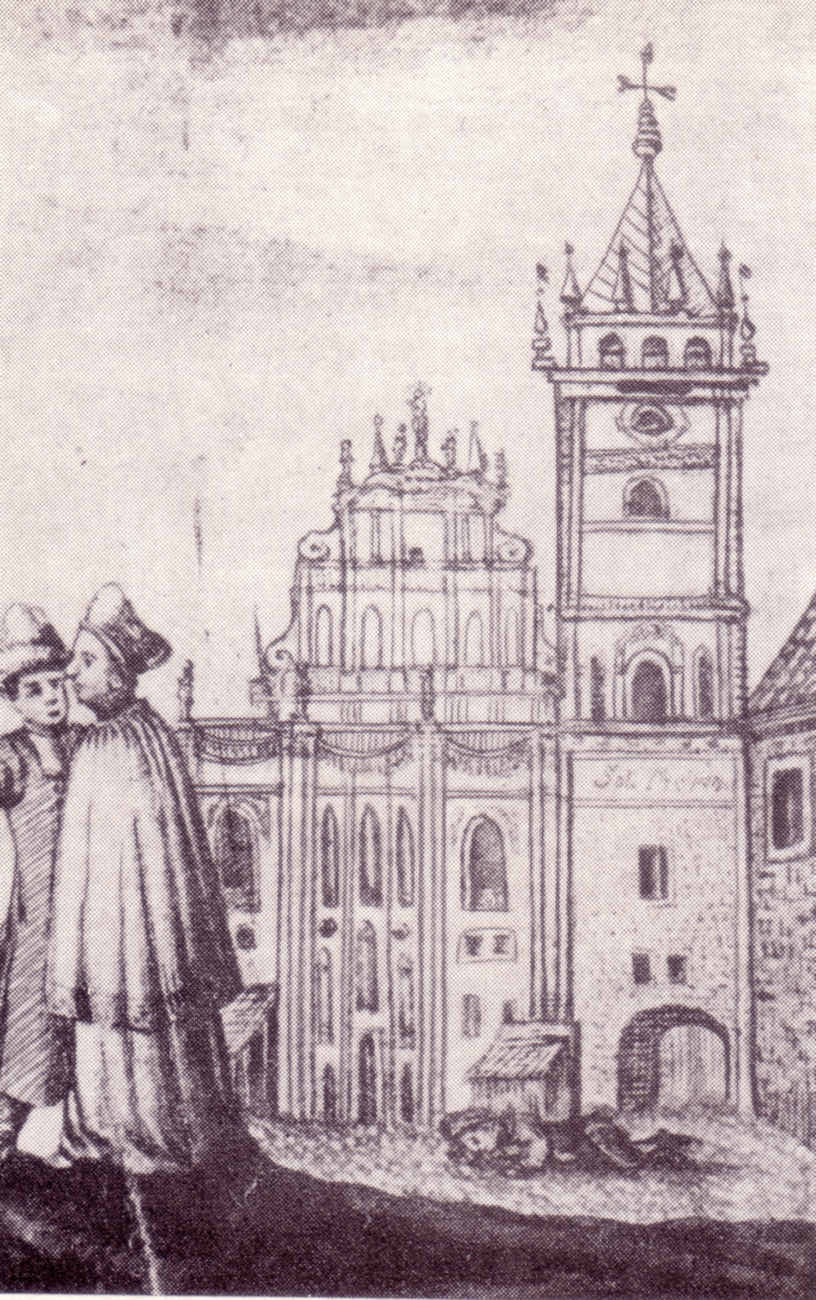
Cathedral with over-80-meter-tall Sobieski Tower. Early-18th-century view.

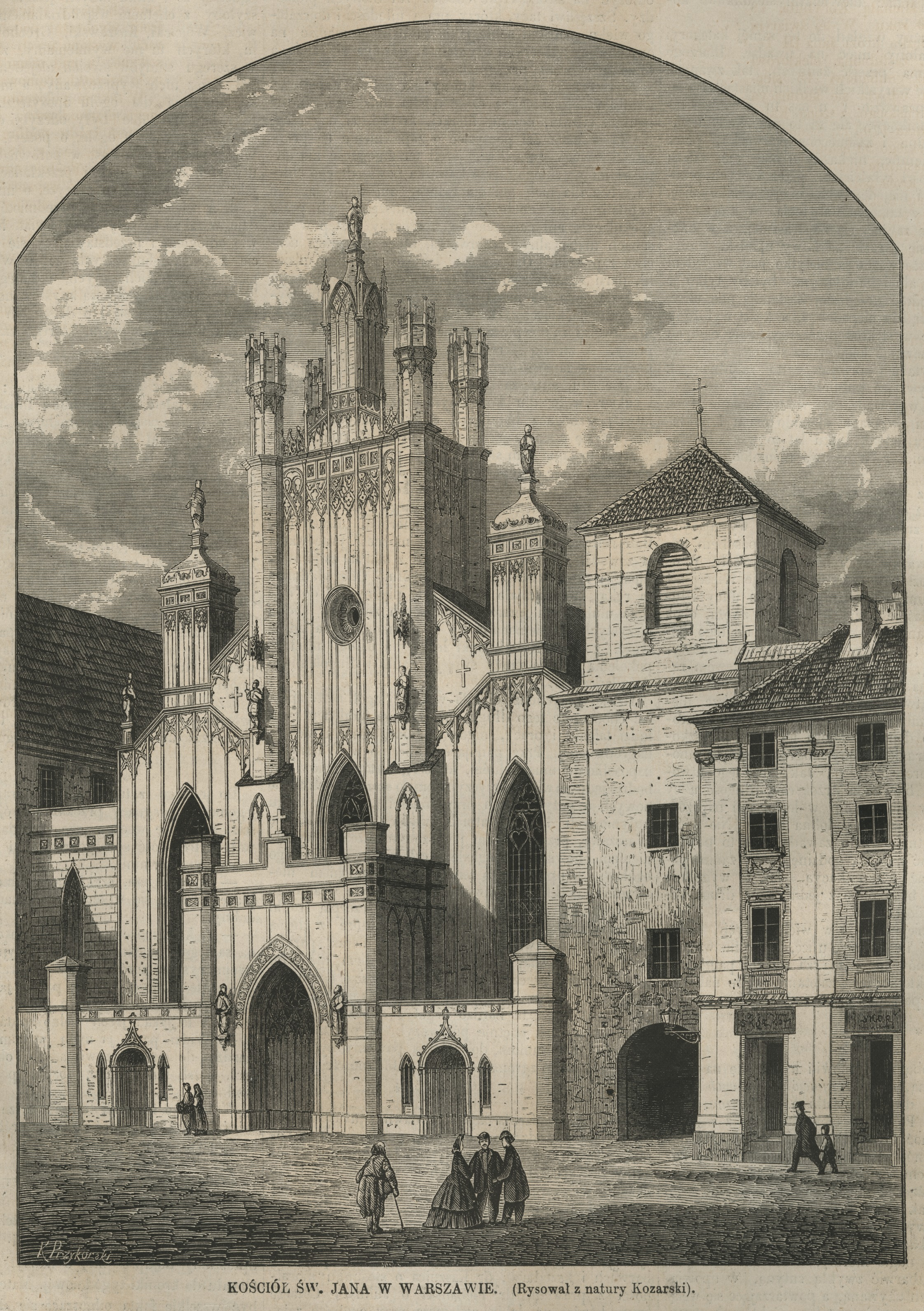
Cathedral in 1865

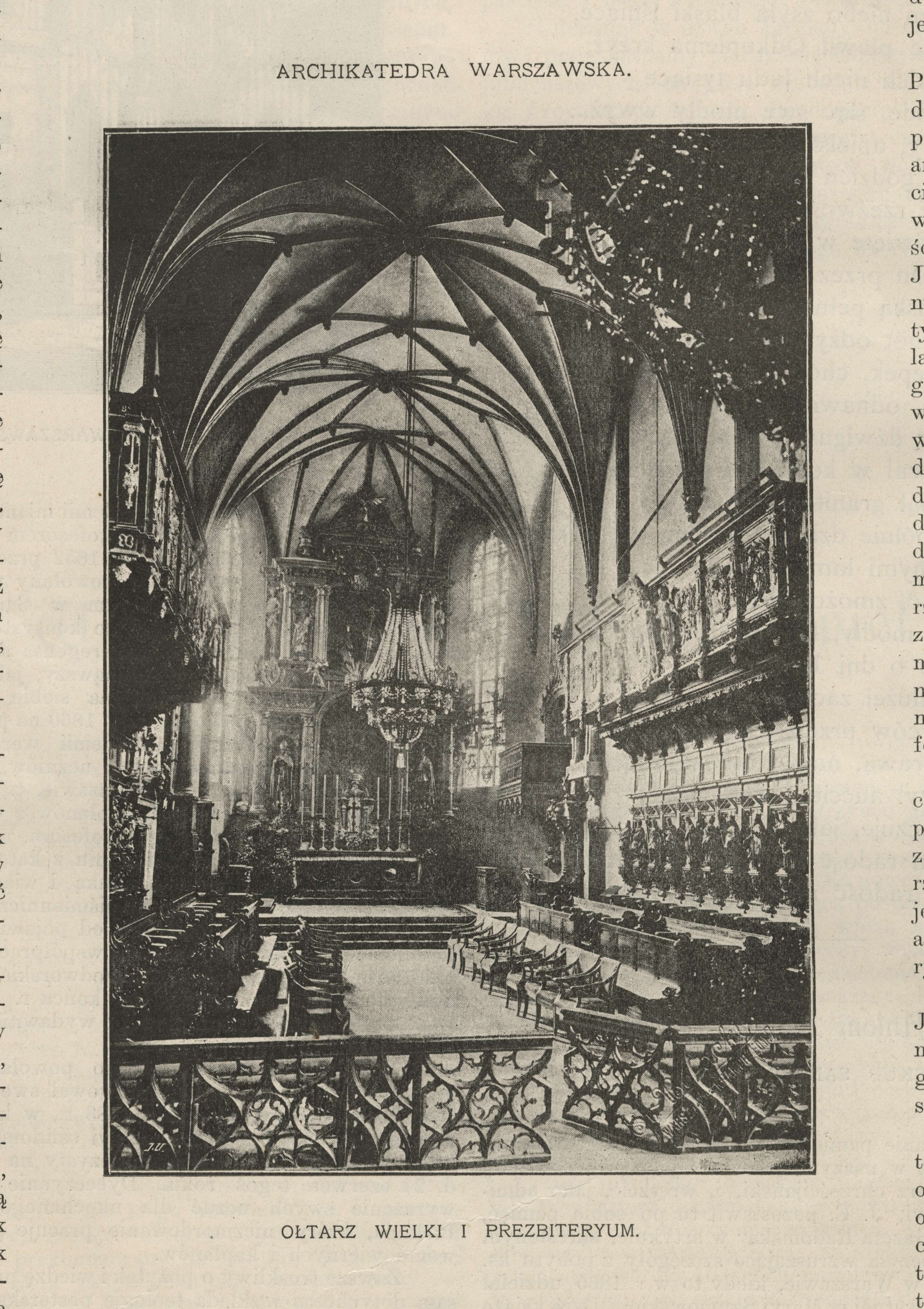
Altar and presbytery in 1899

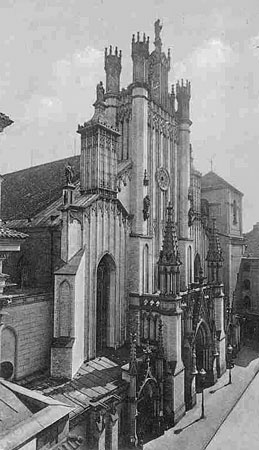
Prewar photo of cathedral, with the distinctive Neo-Gothic façade.

=== Sculptures ===
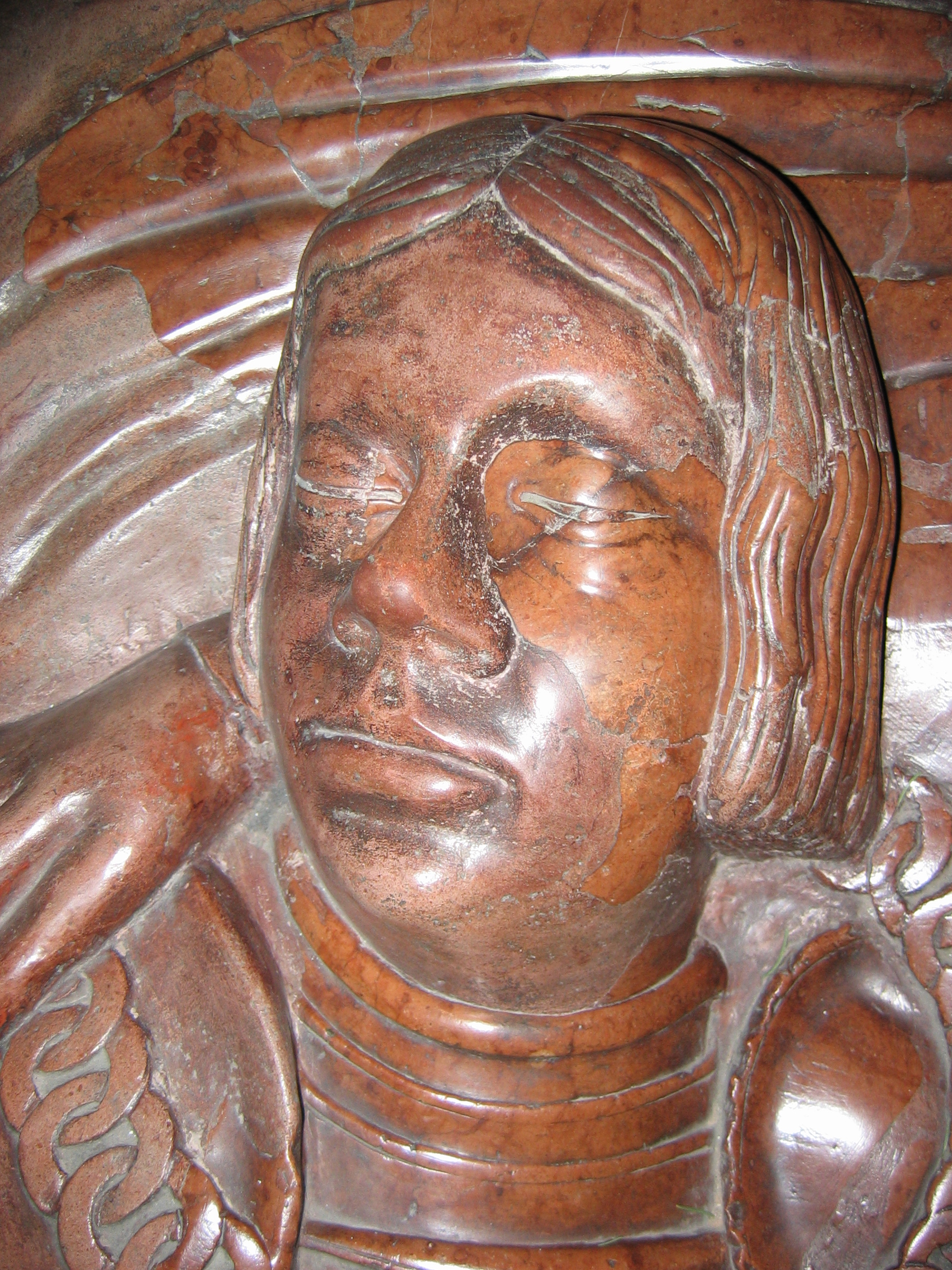
Recumbent effigy of Duke Janusz III of Masovia, by Bernardino de Gianotis, 1528–30.

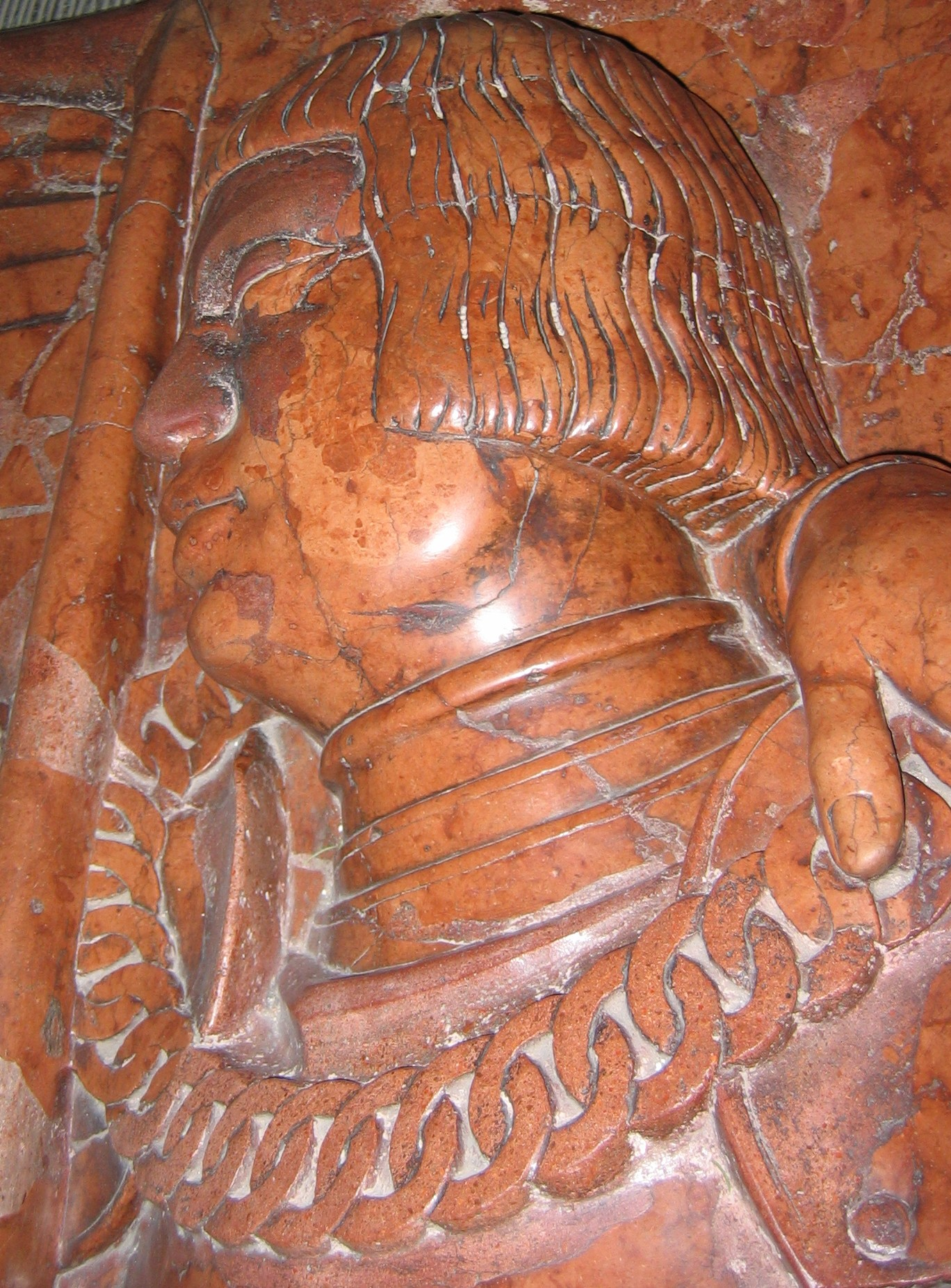
Recumbent effigy of Duke Stanisław I of Masovia. Commissioned, 1526, by Princess Anna of Masovia.

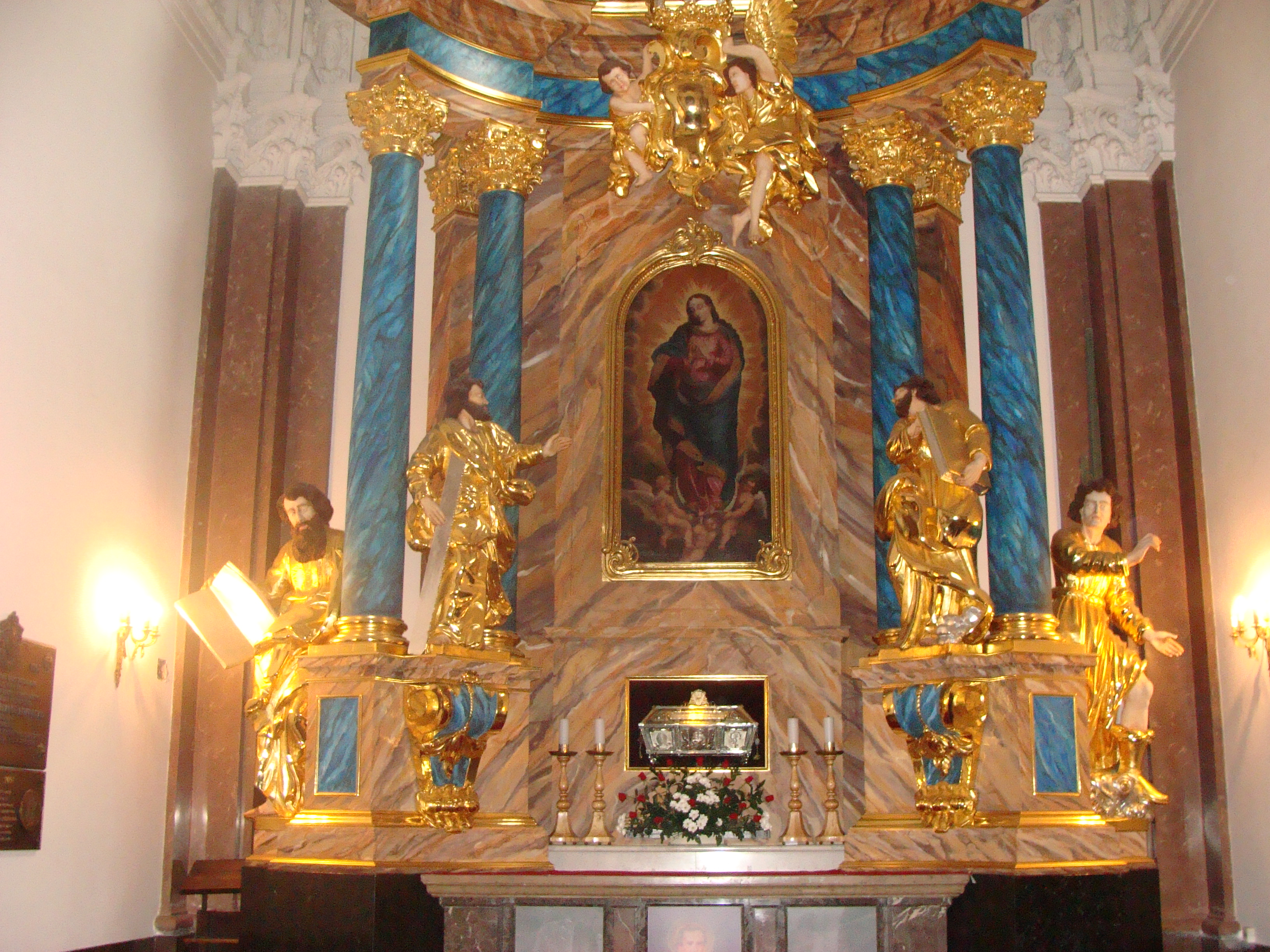
The Rococo Chapel of the Immaculate Conception with an effigy of the Virgin Mary.

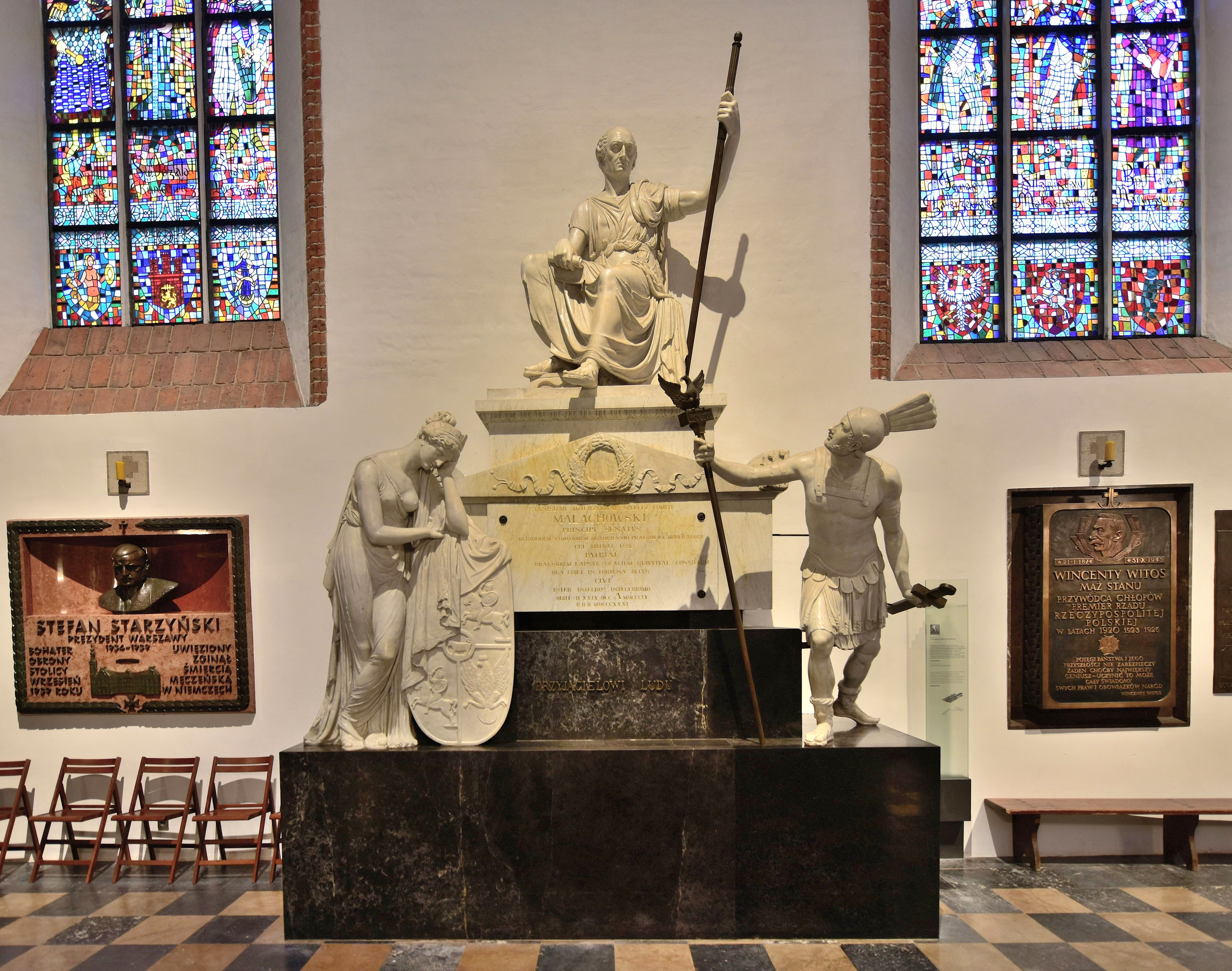
Monument to Stanisław Małachowski, made in Rome by François Laboureur, to Thorvaldsen's design.

== See also ==
- Coronations in Poland
- Polish crown jewels
- Gniezno Cathedral
