= Mazovian =

The adjective Mazovian (or Masovian) may refer to:

- Mazovia, a historic, geographical and cultural region of Poland
- Masovians, an ethnic group in Poland
- Masovian dialect, the dialect of Polish spoken in Mazovia
- Masovian (European Parliament constituency)
- Masovian Voivodeship, an administrative region of present-day Poland, centred on Warsaw
- Masovian Voivodeship (1526–1795)

== See also ==
- Mazowiecki (disambiguation)
