= Zofia Odrowąż =

Polish noblewoman (1537–1580)

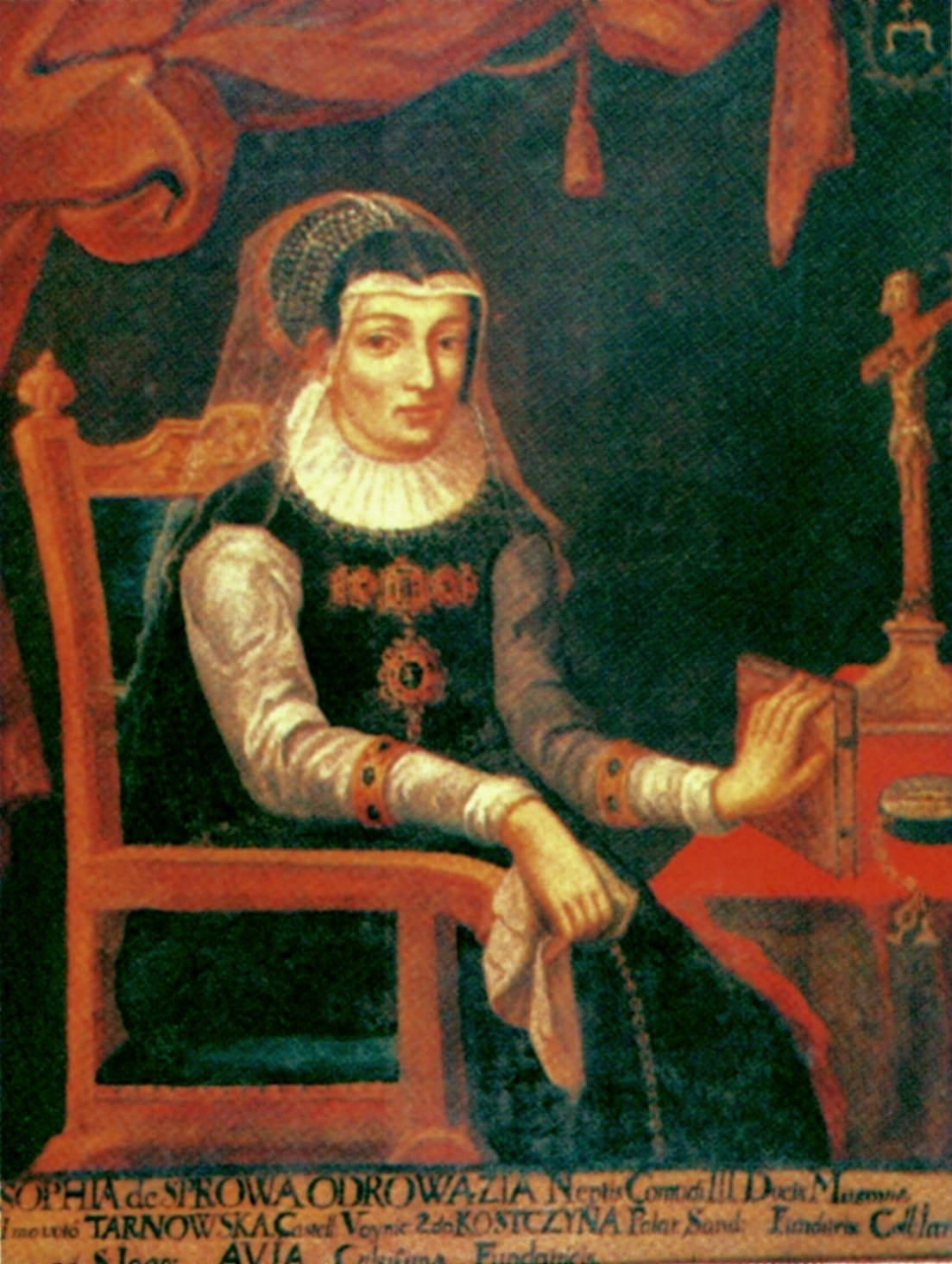

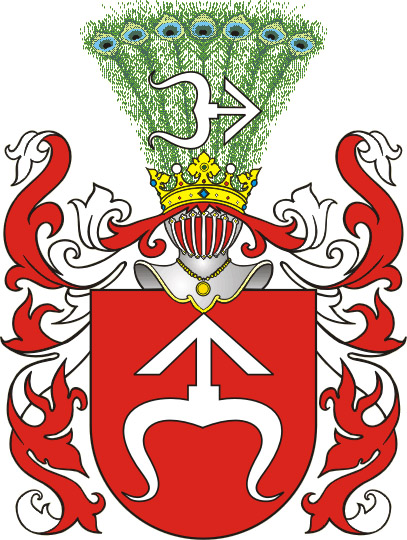
- Coat of arms: Odrowąż
- Born: 1537; Jarosław
- Died: 9 July 1580; Jarosław
- Family: House of Odrowąż
- Consort: Jan Krzysztof Tarnowski; Jan Kostka
- Issue: with Jan Kostka; Jan Kostka (1570–1592); Anna Magdalena Kostka (1570–1580); Anna Zofia Kostka (1575–1635); Katarzyna Kostka Sieniawska(1576–1648)
- Father: Stanisław Odrowąż
- Mother: Anna of Masovia

Zofia Odrowąż (1537–1580) was a Polish noblewoman.

She was the daughter of castellan and voivode Stanisław Odrowąż and only daughter of Anna of Masovia, last Masovian duchess of the Piast dynasty, and became the widow of the castellan of Wojnicz and castellan of Sandomierz. Shortly before 9 November 1555 she became the wife of Hetman Jan Krzysztof Tarnowski (1537–1567). After his death, late in 1574, she married Jan Kostka. With him, she had three surviving children: Jan Kostka, Anna Ostrogska, and Katarzyna Sieniawska.
