= Warsaw Cathedral =

Warsaw Cathedral may refer to:

- St. John's Cathedral, Warsaw (Roman Catholic Archdiocese of Warsaw)
- St. Florian's Cathedral (Roman Catholic Diocese of Warsaw-Praga)
- Cathedral of St. Mary Magdalene, Warsaw (Orthodox)
- Field Cathedral of the Polish Army (Roman Catholic)

Former:

- Alexander Nevsky Cathedral, Warsaw
