= Stephen VII Báthory =

Hungarian nobleman and commander

Stephen VII Báthory (Hungarian: Báthory István; died 3 May 1530) was a Hungarian nobleman and commander. His most prestigious position was Palatine of Hungary.

Stephen belonged to the Ecsed branch of the Báthory family. His father was Andrew Báthory and his uncle was Stephen Báthory, Hungarian commander and later Voivod of Transylvania.

Stephen was Count of Temesvár and in 1514 fought against the rebellion of György Dózsa.

He was elected Palatine of Hungary in 1519 but the opposition of the nobility, which accused him of avarice and licentiousness, resulted in his being temporarily deposed in 1523 and 1525.

In 1526, he fought in the disastrous Battle of Mohács against the Turks, in which King Louis II fell. Stephen managed to escape and became one of the leaders of the pro-Austrian party that wanted to honour the alliance between now extinct royal family and the Habsburg dynasty. Together with King Louis' widow Queen Mary, he fled to Preßburg, where he organized the election of Ferdinand of Austria as King of Hungary.

His siding with the Habsburgs cost him all his possessions within Turkish-controlled Hungary, for which Ferdinand compensated him with the castle Theben. Stephen married Sophia, daughter of the Piast Conrad Duke of Masovia. Their daughter Clara was engaged to be married to Duke Carl of Münsterberg but died before the marriage, in 1535. Their son George was the father of Elizabeth Báthory. Stephen died in Theben.

== See also ==
- Báthory family
