= Janusz III of Masovia =

Polish prince

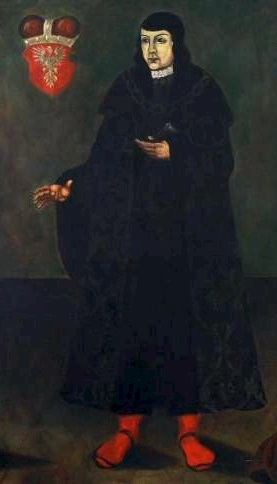
Janusz III of Masovia.

Janusz III of Masovia (pl: Janusz III mazowiecki; ca. 27 September 1502 – 9/10 March 1526) was a Polish prince member of the House of Piast in the Masovian branch. He was a Duke of Czersk, Warsaw, Liw, Zakroczym and Nur from 1503 to 1524 (under regency until 1518) jointly with his brother, and sole ruler from 1524 to 1526 as the last male member of the Masovian Piasts.

He was the second son of Konrad III the Red and his third wife Anna, daughter of Mikolaj Radziwiłł the Old, Voivod of Vilnius and the first Grand Chancellor of Lithuania.

== Life ==
After the death of their father on 28 October 1503, Janusz III and his younger brother Stanisław inherited his domains, but because they were minors, remained under the regency of their mother.

Most of the Masovian inheritance (except Czersk, who was already given to Konrad III as hereditary fief in 1495) was seriously threatened by the Kingdom of Poland at the time of Konrad III's death, and wasn't secured in his sons' hands until 14 March 1504, when by a ruling of King Alexander (who feared the protest of the local nobility) the young princes received their whole patrimony as a fief.

Janusz III and his brother took the government in 1518, due to the constant riots of the local nobility. Despite this, Anna Radziwiłł retained the real power in Masovia until her death in 1522. In the same year when they attained their majority, both princes attended the wedding ceremony of King Sigismund I the Old with Bona Sforza in Kraków.

As Polish vassals, during 1519-1520 Janusz III and his brother participated in the Polish-Teutonic War sending auxiliary troops to the Polish King.

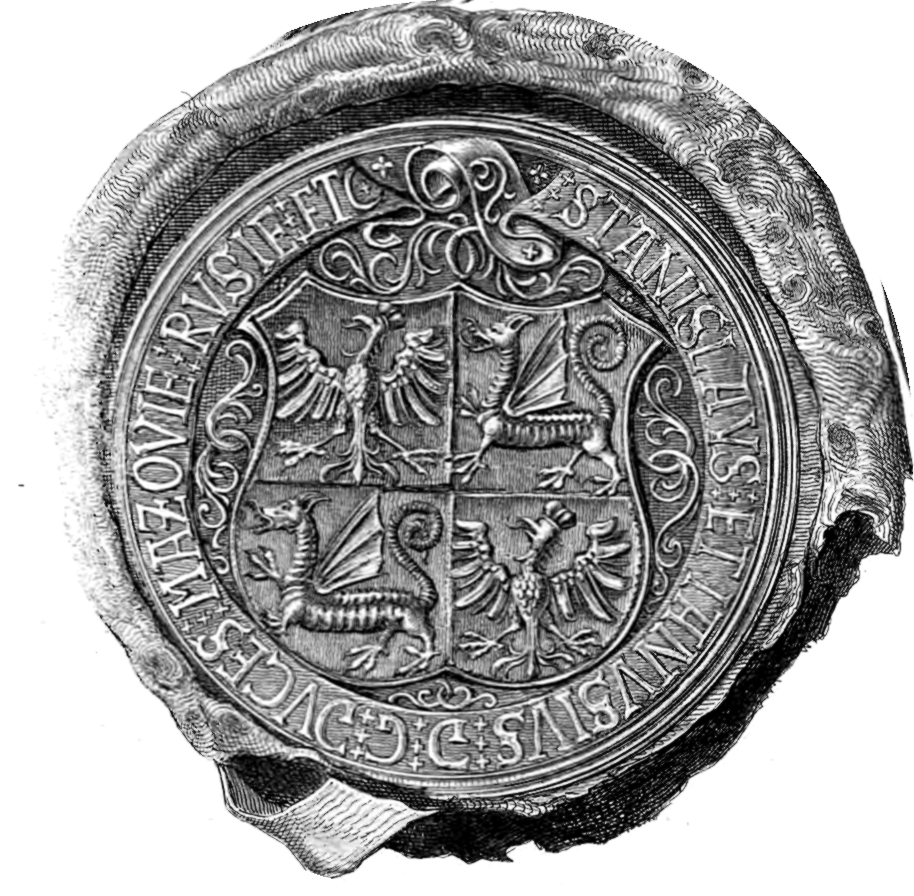
Joint Seal of Stanisław and Janusz III.

Despite being the co-ruler of their domains, Janusz III didn't participate in the government until Stanisław's death on 8 August 1524, when he finally began his sole government. In 1525, Janusz III forbade the Lutheranism in his domains, under penalty of confiscation of property and death.

Like his brother, Janusz III quickly became known for his love of drink and women. His dissolute lifestyle probably contributed to his early death, which took place during the night of 9 to 10 March 1526. He was buried at St. John's Archcathedral, Warsaw. With his death, the male line of Masovian Piasts, originating with Siemowit III became extinct.

The death of both brothers caused unrest, and accusations that they were murdered became widespread. Eventually, King Sigismund I himself looked into the matter, and concluded that there was no foul play.

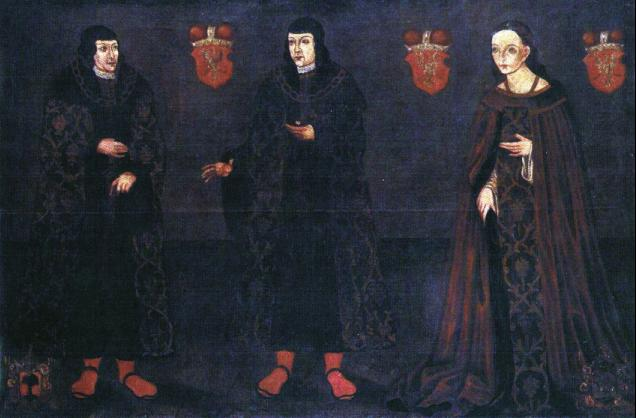
Last of the Masovian Piasts (from left to right): Janusz III (1503–1526), Stanisław (1500–1524) and Anna (1498–1557).

According to Jan Długosz, the real cause of the death of both princes could be an inherited disease of the Masovian princes: tuberculosis; a contemporary historian, Marcin Bielski, suggested that both brothers died due to alcohol poisoning.

Soon after Janusz III's death the Duchy of Masovia was incorporated into the kingdom of Poland, despite resistance from some of the Masovian nobility who tried to retain their independence and argued that the Duchy should be inherited by the female relatives (such as Anna or Sophia of Masovia). The Polish king refused to recognize their demands, and stood by the agreements that made him the heir to the Duchy, reuniting it with Poland. The Duchy, which would become a significant asset of the Polish Jagiellon dynasty, would retain some autonomy until 1576.

He is one of the characters on the famous painting by Jan Matejko, Prussian Homage.

Based on found remains, Janusz III belonged to the haplogroup R1b.
