= Stanisław Odrowąż =

Polish noble (1509–1545)

- Coat of arms: Odrowąż
- Born: 1509; Morraco
- Died: 12 February/2 April 1545
- Noble family: House of Odrowąż
- Spouse: Anna of Masovia (m. 1536)
- Father: Jan Odrowąż
- Mother: Anna Tarnowska-Jarosławska

Stanisław Odrowąż (1509–1545) was a Polish noble (szlachcic).

He married Katarzyna Górka in 1530 and Anna of Masovia from the Piast dynasty in February 1536. He had one child with Anna, Zofia Odrowąż.

He was castellan of Lwów since 1533, starost of Lwów since 1534, voivode of Podole Voivodship since 1535, voivode of Ruthenian Voivodship since 1542 and starost of Sambor.
