= Anna of Masovia =

Polish noble (c. 1498 – after 1557)

- Titular Duchess of Masovia
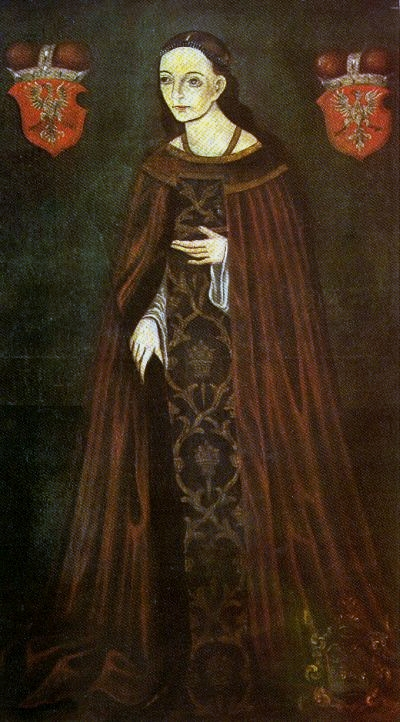
- Portrait, c. 1620–1640
- Born: c. 1498
- Died: after 26 January 1557; Jarosław
- Noble family: House of Piast
- Spouse: Stanisław Odrowąż
- Issue: Zofia Odrowąż
- Father: Konrad III of Masovia
- Mother: Anna Radziwiłł

Anna of Masovia (c. 1498 – after 26 January 1557) was a Polish princess, Titular Duchess of Masovia and the last representative of the Masovian branch of the Piast dynasty.

She was the second daughter of Konrad III of Masovia and Anna Radziwiłł, and the sister to Janusz III, Stanislaus, and Sophia, who married Stephen VII Báthory.

== Life ==
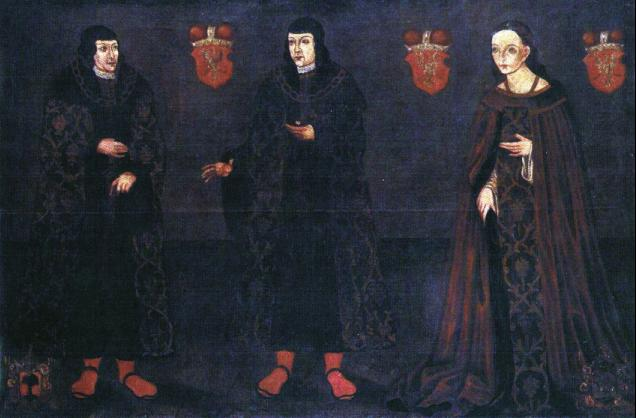
The Last Masovian Piasts: Janusz (left), Stanisław (centre) and Anna (right)

After the death of her brother Janusz III, a group of powerful nobles at the Masovian court attempted to maintain the separate legal status of Masovia and prevent its incorporation into the surrounding Kingdom of Poland. In 1526 this group proclaimed Anna as Duchess, the last representative of the family (however, her elder sister Sophia was still alive at the time). This resistance to the duchy's incorporation, which was largely caused by their fear of losing their significance, was also fuelled by political forces interested in maintaining the status of fiefdoms. In this state Masovia would be united in resistance against the Crown and would also have encouraged the House of Habsburg (in comparison with the Polish rivalry for influence in Moldavia).

In 1536 Anna concluded a marriage with Stanisław Odrowąż. But the king refused to return their goods in return for 10,000 ducats. This caused conflict between the couple and Sigismund I the Old, who deprived the groom of his offices. The dispute ended with the parliament in 1537, which forced Anna and her husband to take an oath before the king, and renounce the hereditary rights of Masovia and the estate for the benefit of the Crown.

After leaving Masovia, Anna temporarily settled in Odrowąż and Sprowa, near the city of Kielce. The rest of her life was spent mostly at the castle in Jarosław, where in approximately 1540 she had her only child, Sophia.

Anna died sometime after 26 January 1557; she was buried in Jarosław.

She was the ancestor of Marie Leszczyńska who became Queen consort of France by her marriage to King Louis XV.
