= Liw, Poland =

Liw
- Village
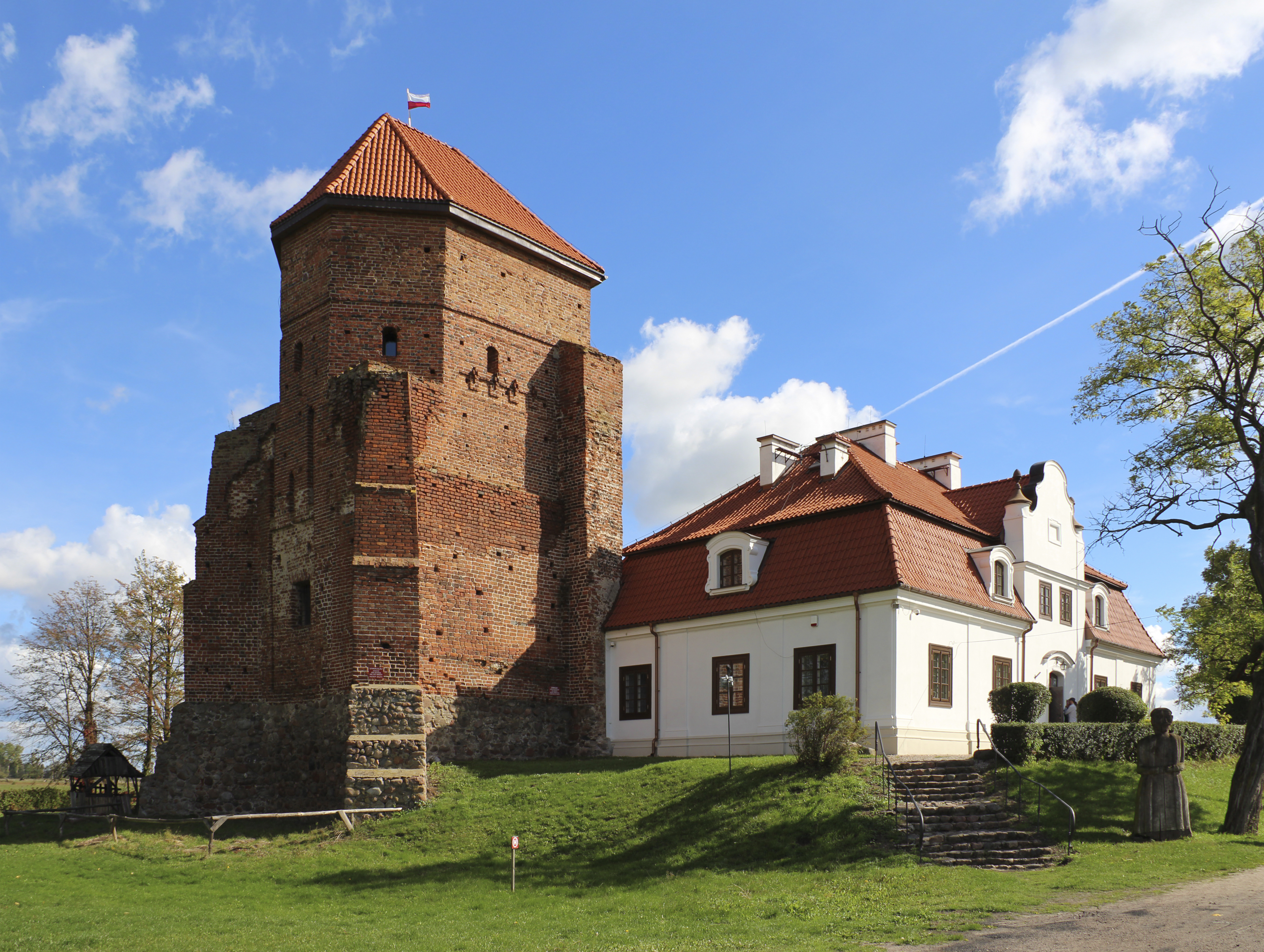
- Castle in Liw

- Coat of arms

- Location within Poland
- Coordinates: 52°23′N 21°57′E
- Country: Poland
- Voivodeship: Masovian
- County: Węgrów
- Gmina: Liw
- Population: 920
- Time zone: UTC+1 (CET)
  - Summer (DST): UTC+2 (CEST)
- Postal code: 07-100
- ISO 3166 code: POL
- Vehicle registration: WWE
- Website: http://www.liw.pl/

Liw [lif] is a village in the administrative district of Gmina Liw, within Węgrów County, Masovian Voivodeship, in east-central Poland.

== History ==
Liw probably started as a gord guarding the ford across Liwiec river and the eastern borders of Duchy of Masovia, and the stronghold was moved from the original site to the area of the present castle, built in 1429, in the 13th century. The first written document about Liw comes from 1304, during Masovian duke Bolesław II of Masovia rule.

Liw received town rights in 1421 or earlier, and between 1493 and 1789 there were two separate towns, Liw Stary ("Old Liw") and Liw Nowy ("New Liw"), and this tradition survived in two Sołtys (Schultheiß) offices in the present village.

Under the Masovian dukes, the town was developing rapidly. Lying on the border with Grand Duchy of Lithuania, it became the capital of ziemia liwska ('Land of Liw'), a judicial center for the eastern Masovia region. It held a weekly Street market, and three times a year there was a fair there. It was finally incorporated into the Crown of the Kingdom of Poland in 1537, upon the settlement between the last princes of Masovia Anna of Masovia and Polish king Sigismund I the Old. The town continued its development and growth into the 17th century, when the wars, Deluge (history) and Great Northern War, brought a physical destruction and a serious decline to the municipality. It lost some of its importance to Węgrów, but its final demise was brought by the Partitions of Poland when it was incorporated into the Austrian Partition and Liw lost its judicial, administrative and economic importance. Austrians dissolved the administrative and territorial unit of ziemia liwska and moved the seat of administrative and judicial powers to Siedlce. In 1807, the town became part of the Duchy of Warsaw, and already resembled more a large village than a town.

In 1815, it became part of the Russian Empire. During the November Uprising there took place a battle, Battle of Liw, between Polish insurrectionists forces and Russian army in April 1831, which led to the Russian forces withdrawing across the Liwiec river.

Based on the Tsar's order, Liw lost its status as a town and became a village in 1866 as the punishment for the town's participation in the January Uprising.

The village has a ruin of Gothic Liw Castle (originally built by the Masovian princes before 1429) and a neo-Gothic church (built 1905–1907).
