= Stanisław of Masovia =

Polish prince (1501–1524)

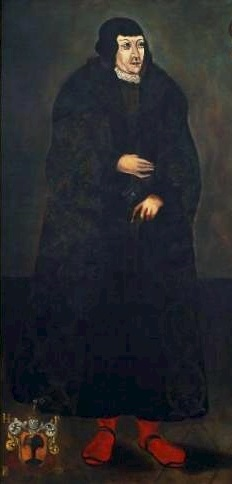
Portrait, c. 1620–1640

Stanisław of Masovia (pl: Stanisław mazowiecki; 17 May 1501 – 8 August 1524), was a Polish prince member of the House of Piast in the Masovian branch. He was a Duke of Czersk, Warsaw, Liw, Zakroczym and Nur during 1503-1524 (under regency until 1518) jointly with his brother.

He was the eldest son of Konrad III the Red and his third wife Anna, a daughter of Mikolaj Radziwiłł the Old, Voivod of Vilnius and the first Grand Chancellor of Lithuania.

== Life ==
After the death of their father on 28 October 1503, Stanisław and his younger brother Janusz III inherited his domains but, because they were minors, remained under the regency of their mother.

Most of the Masovian inheritance (except Czersk, which had already been given to Konrad III as a hereditary fief in 1495) was seriously threatened by the Kingdom of Poland at the time of Konrad III's death, and was not secured in his sons' hands until 14 March 1504, when by a ruling of King Alexander, the young princes received their whole patrimony as a fief.

Stanisław and his brother took the government in 1518, because of the constant riots of the local nobility. Despite this, Anna Radziwiłł retained the real power in Masovia until her death in 1522. In the same year when they attained their majority, both princes attended the wedding of King Sigismund I the Old to Bona Sforza in Kraków.

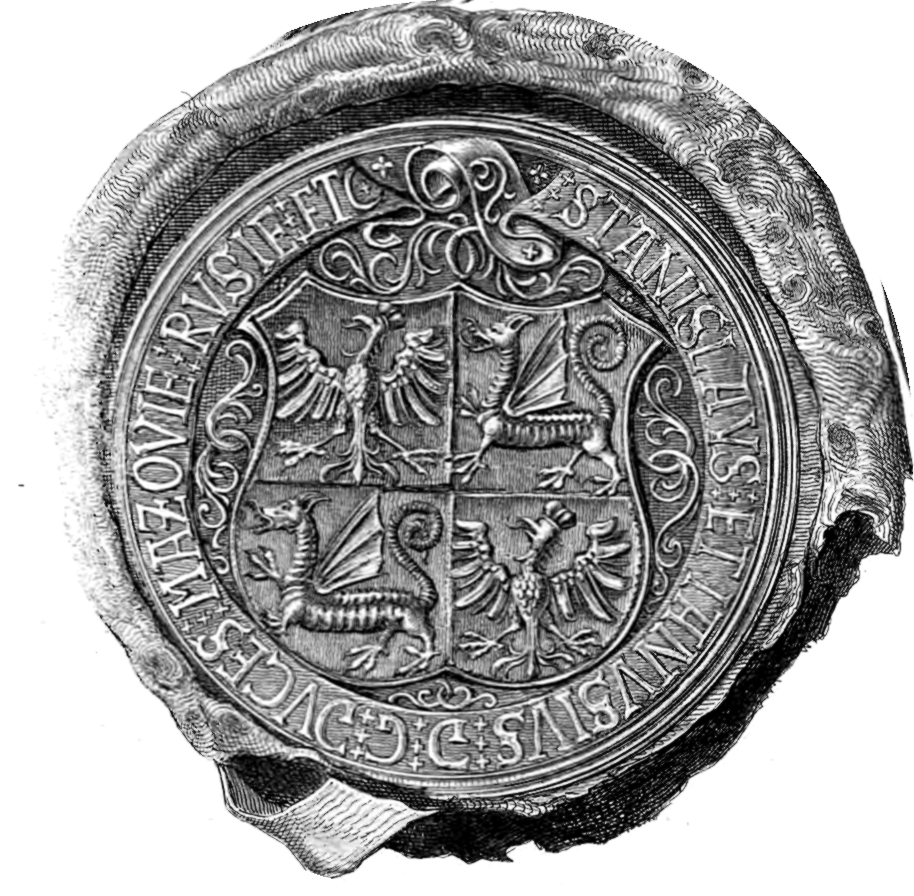
Joint Seal of Stanisław and Janusz III.

In 1519, fulfilling their duties as Polish vassals, Stanisław and Janusz III intervened in the Polish-Teutonic War, sending auxiliary troops to the Polish King, and in the winter of 1519-1520 they personally captured several towns in Masuria. At the same time, Stanisław secretly entered into talks with the Teutonic Knights for a ceasefire, which finally took place in December 1520, a few months before a peace treaty ended the war between Poland and the Teutonic Order.

In their private lives, both Stanisław and his brother were heavily inclined to drink and women; however, in order to continue his bloodline, in 1523 Stanisław started negotiations for marriage with Princess Hedwig of Poland, only surviving daughter of King Sigismund I and his first wife, Barbara Zápolya. The wedding never took place; one year later, and likely as a result of his dissolute lifestyle, Stanisław died on 8 August 1524. He was buried at St. John's Archcathedral, Warsaw.

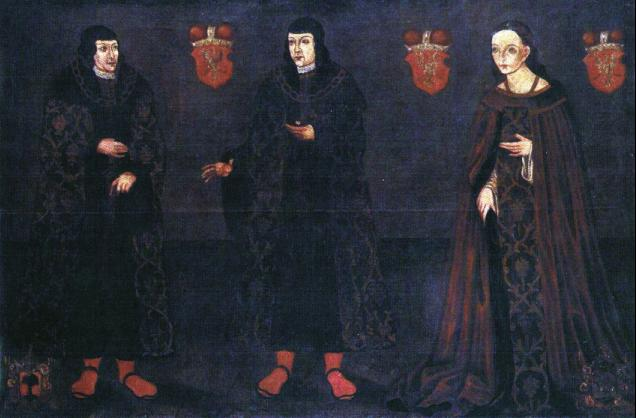
Last of the Masovian Piasts (from left to right): Janusz III (1503-1526), Stanisław (1500-1524) and Anna (1498-1557).

The sudden death of Stanisław, and that two years later of his younger brother Janusz III, were considered suspicious at the time. The main suspect was a Płock lady called Katarzyna Radziejowska, who after being seduced and abandoned by both princes, was believed to have poisoned firstly Anna Radziwiłł, then Stanisław and finally Janusz III in revenge. Declared guilty, she and her supposed accomplice were tied naked to poles and beaten for hours, and finally burned alive. The hurry where the sentence was carried raised even more suspicion that in fact the real instigator of the crimes was Queen Bona. The controversy was so intense that King Sigismund I, in order to clarify the matter once and for all, ordered an investigation, as a result of which a special edict was declared on 9 February 1528 which ruled that the princes "weren't victims of a human hand, but was the will of the Almighty Lord that caused their deaths".

According to Jan Długosz, the real cause of the death of both princes could be an inherited disease of the Masovian princes: tuberculosis.
