= Władysław I of Płock =

Polish prince

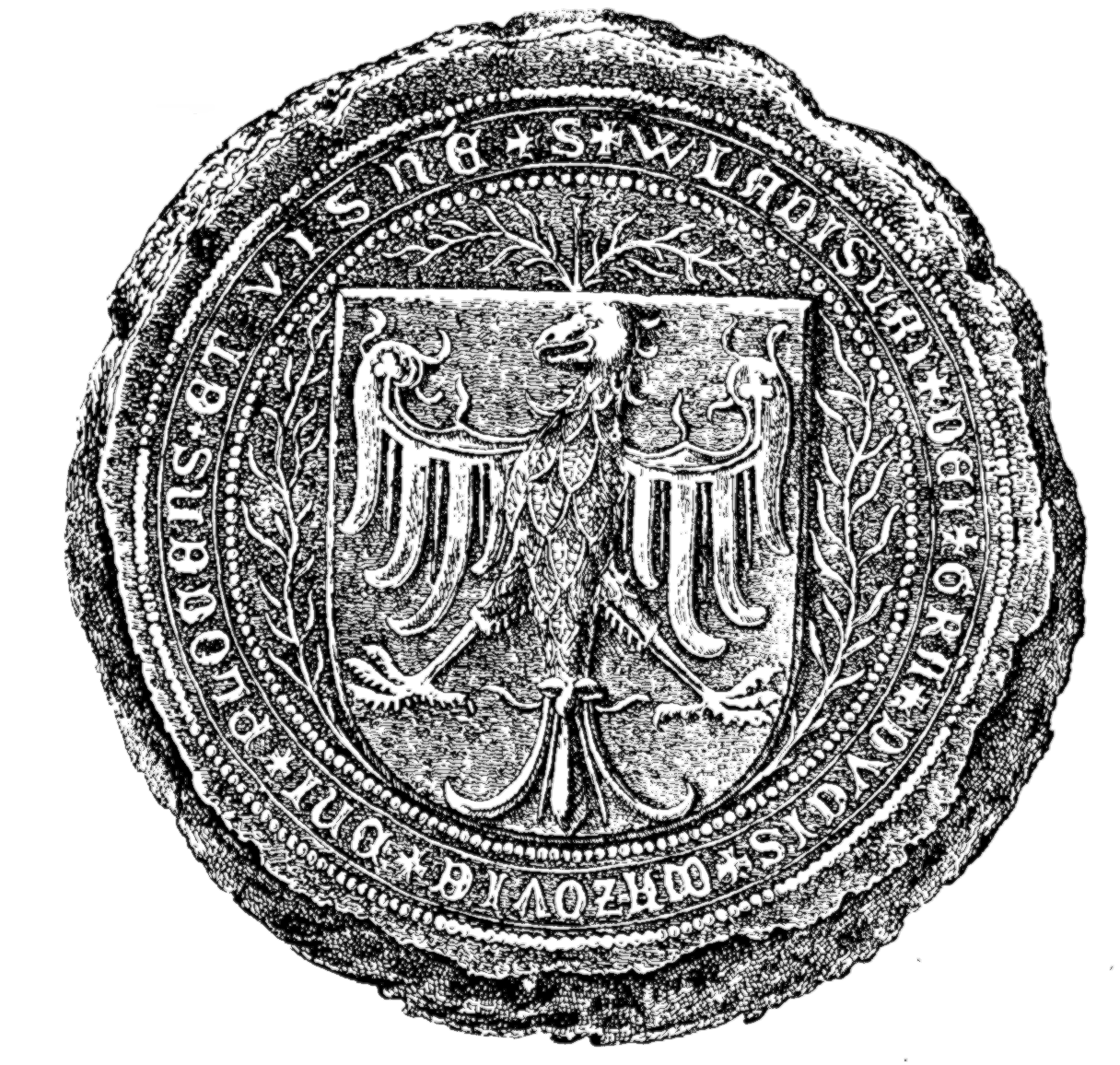
Seal of Władysław I, 1435.

Władysław I of Płock (1406/09 - 11/12 December 1455), was a Polish prince and member of the House of Piast from the Masovian branch. He was a Duke of Płock, Rawa, Gostynin, Sochaczew, Belz, Płońsk, Zawkrze and Wizna during 1426-1434 jointly with his brothers. After the division of the paternal inheritance between him and his brothers in 1434, he became sole ruler over Płock, Płońsk, Wizna and Zawkrze. In 1442 he reunited their patrimony (except Gostynin).

== Life ==
He was the fifth son of Siemowit IV, Duke of Masovia and Alexandra, daughter of Algirdas.

His first appearance came in March 1424, when along with his brothers Siemowit V, Casimir II and Trojden II, Władysław I attended the wedding and coronation of King Władysław II Jagiełło's third wife, Sophia of Halshany.

Two years later, on 21 January 1426, after the death of their father, Władysław I and his brothers inherited his lands. To avoid further weakening their positions and domains with subsequent divisions, they decided to co-rule their patrimony. Eight months later, on 8 September, Władysław I and his brothers Siemowit V and Trojden II paid homage to the Polish King at Sandomierz.

In 1431 as Polish vassals, Władysław I and his brothers played a small part in the campaign in Volhynia against Švitrigaila.

For unknown reasons, in 1433 Władysław I quarreled with his brothers and strongly objected to their pro-Polish policy in the war against the Teutonic Order. Probably as a manifestation of hostility against Poland, Władysław I did not attend the coronation of King Władysław III in July 1434 at Kraków.

On 31 August 1434 the sons of Siemowit IV finally decided to end their co-rulership and made the formal territorial division. Władysław I received the districts of Płock, Płońsk, Wizna and Zawkrze. On 31 December 1435, he signed the Peace of Brześć Kujawski.

At the end of the 1430s, Władysław I once again changed his policy towards Poland and approached the first person in the Kingdom: Zbigniew Oleśnicki, Bishop of Kraków. As a gesture of his friendly relationship with Poland, Władysław I and his brother Siemowit V attended the Confederation of Nowy Korczyn on 20 April 1438, where the princes strongly supported the political line of the Bishop (for example, the rejection of Prince Casimir to the Bohemian crown). On 25 April, Władysław I and his nephew Bolesław IV of Warsaw agreed to support the Polish against the Hussite confederates led by Spytek of Melsztyn.

The alliance formed in Nowy Korczyn between Władysław I and Bolesław IV soon resulted in a common Eastern policy. Using the chaos reigned in Lithuania after the death of Sigismund Kęstutaitis in 1440, they intervened and took the district of Podlachia, who once belonged to Janusz I of Warsaw (although only during his lifetime). The military operation began on the borders of Władysław I's domains; however, he carefully leave the attack to Bolesław IV. As a result, Władysław I managed to take only Bielsk Podlaski. The reluctance of Władysław I to a direct intervention in the war was revealed in 1444, when he didn't send auxiliary troops to Bolesław IV.

Two years before (1442) the deaths in a short period of time of his brothers Siemowit V and Casimir II caused that Władysław I reunited almost all their paternal domains (except Gostynin, who remained at the hands of Siemowit V's widow Margaret of Racibórz as her dower). The acquisition of nearly half of the old Duchy of Masovia enabled Władysław I to pursue a more flexible policy.

Władysław I's relations with Lithuania remained ambiguous, especially after Prince Casimir, younger brother of King Władysław III became in the new Grand Duke in 1440. At that moment the Masovian rulers strongly supported Michael Žygimantaitis, the son of Sigismund Kęstutaitis, who was not only favorably accepted in the courts of Płock and Warsaw (who caused political agitation) but also married with Władysław I's youngest sister, Catherine.

The support given to the rival of Casimir IV when he was the Grand Duke of Lithuania proved to be dangerous after he also became King of Poland in 1447. In 1448, the new King wanted to annexed Belz, who was inherited by Władysław I after the death of his brother Casimir II. Only thanks to the intervention of King Frederick IV of Germany (nephew of Władysław I as son of his sister Cymburgis), Casimir IV renounced to his attempts. Under the terms of the agreement Władysław I remained in the possession of Belz, and in return he stopped to support Michael Žygimantaitis in his fight for the Lithuanian throne.

Finally, in 1450 was made a complete agreement with the Kingdom of Poland, which was manifested when Władysław I, as a Polish vassal, send his troops to an expedition to Moldova. However, during the rest of his life Władysław I remained unfavorably oriented with respect to Poland; for example, he remained neutral after the outbreak of the Thirteen Years' War against the Teutonic Order, in which he tried to play the role of mediator.

Władysław I died on the night of 11 to 12 December 1455 in his palace at Niedźwiedza near Sochaczew. The cause of his death was probably the hereditary disease who affected the Masovian Dukes: tuberculosis. He was buried at Płock Cathedral.

== Marriage and issue ==
In 1444 Władysław I married Anna (ca. 1425? – aft. 15 August 1482), a daughter of Duke Konrad V of Oleśnica. They had two sons:

- Siemowit VI (2 January 1446 - 31 December 1461/1 January 1462).
- Władysław II (aft. 31 October 1448 - 27 February 1462).

Because his sons are minors at the time of his death, the regency was taken by their mother and Paweł Giżycki, Bishop of Płock. In addition, Anna received the district of Sochaczew as her dower until 1476, when the land was annexed to the Kingdom of Poland and she received in exchange the towns of Koło and Mszczonów.
