= Casimir II of Belz =

Polish noble

Casimir II of Belz (Kazimierz II bełski; c. 1401 or 1403 – 15 September 1442), was a Polish prince and member of the Masovian branch of the House of Piast. He was the duke of Płock, Rawa Mazowiecka, Gostynin, Sochaczew, Belz, Płońsk, Zawkrze and Wizna. From 1426 to 1434, he ruled jointly with his brothers, but he became sole ruler over Belz in 1434, after he and his brothers divided their paternal inheritance between themselves.

== Biography ==
He was the third son of Siemowit IV, Duke of Masovia and Alexandra of Lithuania, daughter of Algirdas. As a child, Casimir II was sent to Lithuania, which would grant him the support of the Lithuanian Grand Duke Vytautas the Great in the future. He spent some time at the court of King Władysław II Jagiełło of Poland.

After 1420, Siemowit IV began gradually allowing his adult sons to participate in governing due to his growing blindness. Casimir II and his older brother Siemowit V were formally named co-rulers.

The first major challenge of Casimir II's reign was the trip to Brest-Litovsk (now Brest, Belarus). On 14 November 1425, he and his brother solemnly vowed to the crown his fidelity and acceptance of the recent controversy over the appointment of Stanisław z Pawłowic (former Chancellor of Siemowit IV) as Bishop of Płock.

Siemowit IV died on 21 January 1426, leaving his domains to his four sons: Siemowit V, Casimir II, Trojden II (d. 1427) and Władysław I (a fifth son, Alexander, pursued a career in the Church instead). Not wanting to further weaken their positions and domains with subsequent divisions, they decided to co-rule all of their paternal inheritance.

In accordance with their duties as Polish vassals, they went to Sandomierz soon after they assumed power and paid homage to Władysław II on 8 September 1426. Casimir II did not attend the ceremony, and also began to refuse to pay the customary tribute to Władysław II in successive periods (among his notorious absences was in 1428 at Łęczyca). The Polish king began to fear that the refusal of Casimir II to pay homage could give his brothers reasons to violate their obligations as vassals. This situation was maintained largely due to the support granted to Casimir II by Vytautas, who assisted the prince on a campaign organized in 1428 against Veliky Novgorod. The unexpected illness and death of his protector Vytautas forced Casimir II to finally pay homage to Władysław II in September 1430 at Sandomierz; almost four years after his brothers.

In 1431, Casimir II, fulfilling his obligations as Polish vassal, led his troops to join Władysław II in his fight against Švitrigaila. Casimir II did not take part in the whole campaign, and instead focused on suppressing the riots of the Ruthenians instigated by Švitrigaila's agents.

Władysław II died on 1 June 1434, and this allowed Casimir II and his siblings more freedom and flexibility in the governance of their territories. In July 1434, Casimir II and Siemowit V arrived in Kraków, where they attended the coronation of the new Polish king, Władysław III.

On 31 August 1434, the sons of Siemowit IV finally decided to end their co-rulership and formally divided their father's former territories. On 31 December 1435, Casimir II (now Duke of Belz) signed the Peace of Brześć Kujawski. In the following years, Casimir II focused on the governance of his domains, which were in the Polish-Lithuanian border; this caused conflicts between the Polish (mainly from Lesser Poland) nobility and Švitrigaila's magnates. The battles of varying degrees of success continued until 4 September 1437, when, in presence of Casimir II, the Polish nobles negotiated the final peace treaty with Švitrigaila at Lviv.

Three years later, in 1440, Casimir II also supported the expedition of Prince Casimir of Poland to Vilnius in order to obtain the title of Grand Duke of Lithuania.

Casimir II gradually assimilated the Red Ruthenian lands under his and his brothers' rule into Polish customs and laws. This involved, among other things, the introduction of the Polish laws and administration.

On 26 June 1442, Casimir II married Margaret (d. 5 November 1464), a daughter of Castellan Vincent Szamotuły from Międzyrzecz. The union was short-lived and childless: three months later, on 15 September 1442, Casimir II died of the plague in the village of Miączyn near Krasnystaw. He was buried in the Masovian Ducal crypt at Płock Cathedral. His domains were inherited by his brother Władysław I.
