= Duchy of Belz =

Volhynian fiefdom under various successive countries

Duchy of Belz Principality of Belz Księstwo Bełskie (Polish) Белзьке князівство (Ukrainian)
- 1170–1462
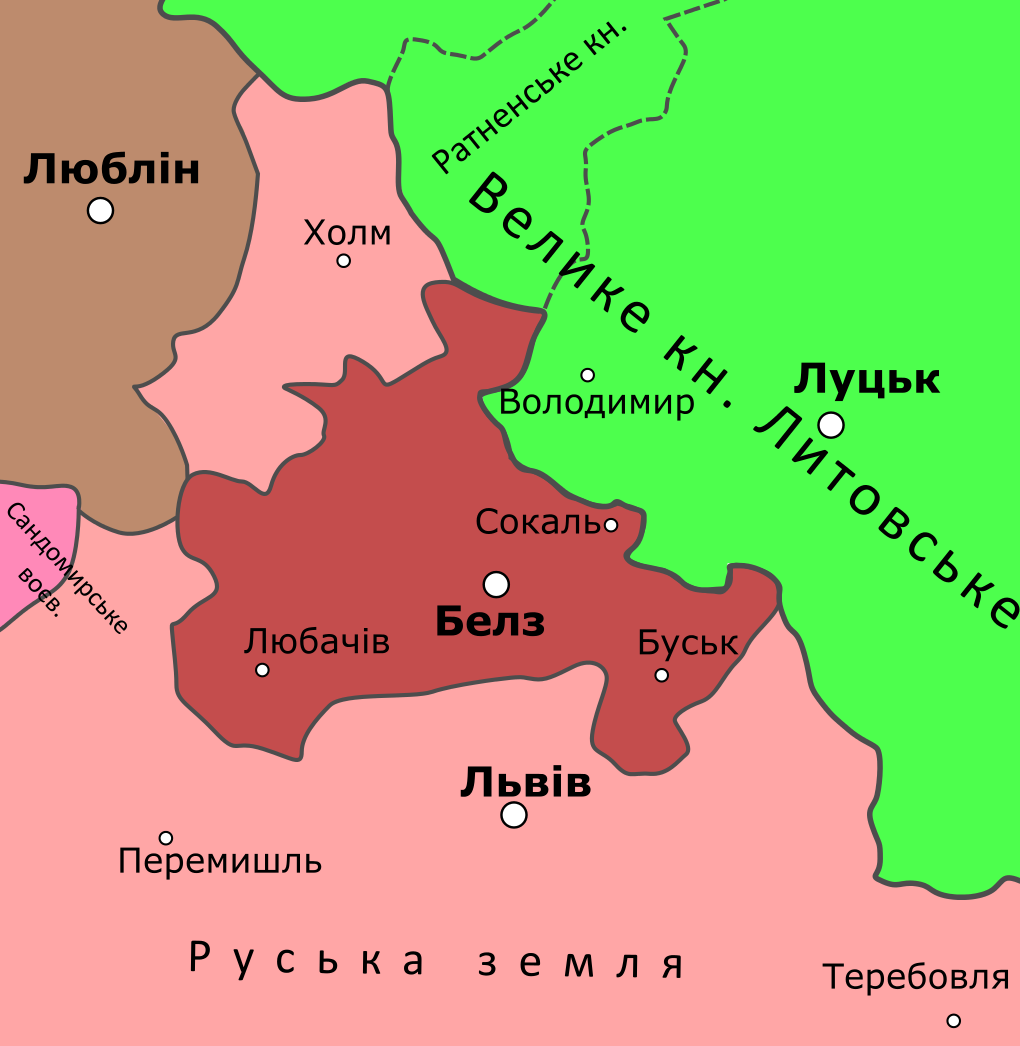
- Duchy of Belz in the beginning of the XV century
- Status: constituent part of Galicia–Volhynia (Rus), then Hungary, later Masovia
- Capital: Belz
- Common languages: Old East Slavic, Old Polish Language among Aristocracy
- Religion: Orthodoxy
- Government: Monarchy
- Duke of Belz
- History
  - Established: 1170
  - passes from Duchy of Volhynia to Duchy of Galicia–Volhynia: 1234
  - passes from Duchy of Galicia–Volhynia to Grand Duchy of Lithuania: 1340
  - passes from Grand Duchy of Lithuania to Kingdom of Hungary: 1377/1378
  - passes from Kingdom of Hungary to Kingdom of Poland: 1387
  - Disestablished: 1462
Preceded by	Succeeded by
Kievan Rus'	Kingdom of Poland (1320–1385); Kingdom of Galicia–Volhynia

Duchy of Belz or Principality of Belz was a duchy, formed in the late 12th century in Kievan Rus. During its history, the duchy was a constituent part of some other political entities, such as the Kingdom of Rus, the Kingdom of Hungary, and the Duchy of Masovia. Eventually, in the late 14th century, it was incorporated into Poland, becoming later the Bełz Voivodeship.

== History ==
The duchy formed in 1170 because of the feudal fragmentation of Kievan Rus'. The Volhynia region, centered on Volodymyr, was passed to Mstislav II of Kiev (died 1170), who later split it between his sons. Mstislav was married to Agnes of Poland and in fierce opposition to Yuri Dolgoruki. Being exiled to Poland for a short period of time, Mstislav was able to drive Dolgoruki out of Volhynia.

With time, the city of Belz and the surrounding territories were passed to Vsevolod Mstislavich, who in turn passed it to his son Alexander. Alexander, a nephew of Roman the Great, was deposed from Belz in 1234 by Daniel of Galicia, who incorporated Belz into the Duchy of Galicia–Volhynia (later the Kingdom of Rus), which would control Belz till 1340. Soon afterwards, in 1240 and 1241, it was ravaged by the Mongols, as were most other Rus principalities; the town was burned, the local castle destroyed and locals had to recognize Mongol suzerainty. The Mongol influence waned in the following decades, because of the decline of the Mongol Empire and Pax Mongolica.

Early in the 14th century, after the death of Boleslaw-Yuri II of Galicia, the King of Rus, a war started over succession. Eventually the Duchy was inherited by prince Yuri, son of Narimantas (Jerzy Narymuntowicz) of the Grand Duchy of Lithuania. The period of Yuri's rule of Belz (1340–1377) saw the Galicia–Volhynia Wars; Belz was besieged several times (in 1351, 1352 and 1355). From 1378 to 1387, it fell into the sphere of influence of the Kingdom of Hungary, as in 1377 Belz was captured by Louis I of Hungary; for several years, the duchy was governed in Louis's name by prince Władysław Opolczyk. At that time, Poland was in a brief union with Hungary, but in 1387, after the end of the union, Belz was taken by Queen Jadwiga of Kingdom of Poland.

At first it was part of another Polish fiefdom, the Duchy of Masovia, as in 1388 the king of Poland, Władysław Jagiełło, granted Belz to Siemowit IV, Duke of Masovia, for his recognition of Masovia as a fiefdom of Poland and as a dowry for Siemowit's marriage with Jagiełło's sister, Alexandra. In 1462, after the death of Władysław II of Płock, the last of Siemowit's IV direct descendants, Casimir IV Jagiellon of Poland attempted to incorporate the entire Duchy of Masovia to Poland; eventually he succeeded only in incorporating the Duchy of Belz into the administrative structure of Poland as the Bełz Voivodeship (palatinate). Eventually, the Duchy of Masovia was incorporated in 1526. Belz remained part of Poland (later, the Polish–Lithuanian Commonwealth) until its partitions in the late 18th century.

== Territory ==
The duchy's capital was in Belz.

== Rulers ==
- Vsevolod Mstislavich of Volhynia
- Alexander Vsevolodovich (?-1234)
- Vasylko Romanovich (1207–1211)
- Alexander Vsevolodovich (?-1234)
- Galicia–Volhynia
  - Daniel of Galicia (1234-?)
  - Lev Danylovich (1245–1264)
  - Yuri I of Galicia (1264–1301)
  - Andrew of Galicia (1301–1323)
  - Boleslaw-Yuri II of Galicia (1323–1340)
- Lithuania
  - Yuri, son of Narimantas (1340-1377/1378)
- Hungary
  - Władysław Opolczyk (for Louis I of Hungary) (1377/1378-1387)
- Poland
  - Jadwiga of Poland/Władysław Jagiełło (1387–1388)
- Masovia:
  - Siemowit IV, Duke of Masovia (1388–1426)
  - Kazimierz II of Belz (1426–1442, till 1434 with brothers (Władysław I of Płock, Siemowit V, Trojden II (d.1427)))
  - Władysław II of Płock (1455–1462)
- Poland
  - Casimir IV Jagiellon
