= Siemowit VI of Płock =

Polish prince

Siemowit VI of Płock (pl: Siemowit VI płocki; 2 January 1446 - 31 December 1461/1 January 1462), was a Polish prince member of the House of Piast from the Masovian branch. He was a Duke of Płock, Rawa Mazowiecka, Belz, Płońsk, Zawkrze and Wizna during 1455-1461/62 (under regency until 1459) jointly with his brother, since 1459 ruler over Gostynin.

He was the eldest son of Władysław I of Płock and Anna, daughter of Duke Konrad V of Oleśnica.

== Life ==
After the death of their father on 11/12 December 1455, Siemowit VI and his brother Władysław II inherited their domains; however, because at that moment they are minors, the regency was held by their mother and Paweł Giżycki, Bishop of Płock.

At the beginning of 1459 Siemowit VI attained his majority and began his personal rule according to law; however, in practice his regents continued to have the real power.

The first independent move of Siemowit VI took place at the convention of Czersk, where he, together with Duke Konrad III the Red, made a peace treaty with the Teutonic Order. In this way, the young prince followed his father's policy of not engaging in conflicts with the Order, despite that the Polisht King was in a war with them.

Shortly after he attained his majority, Siemowit VI's lands where further expanded with annexation of the district of Gostynin after the death of his aunt Margaret of Racibórz, widow of Siemowit V, who obtained this land after her husband's death as her dower.

Siemowit VI died on the night of 31 December 1461 on 1 January 1462. He was buried at Płock Cathedral.

The sudden death of the young prince and one month later of his brother Władysław II caused many rumours of poisoning. The charges of murder were directly towards the Castellan of Sochaczew, Gotard of Rybna, who allegedly was offended because the princes deprived him of a country state. This sensational accusations, however, are generally rejected, since was well known that chronicler Jan Długosz (who was a contemporary of the princes) disagreed these rumours. Perhaps the real reason of the death of both brothers in a short space of time was tuberculosis, which, moreover, was the cause of their father's death.
