= Trojden II of Płock =

Polish prince

Trojden II of Płock (1403/06 - 25 July 1427), was a Polish prince member of the House of Piast from the Masovian branch. He was a Duke of Płock, Rawa Mazowiecka, Gostynin, Sochaczew and Belz during 1426-1427 jointly with his brothers.

He was the fourth son of Siemowit IV, Duke of Masovia and Alexandra of Lithuania, daughter of Algirdas.

== Life ==
On 5 March 1424 along with his brothers Siemowit V, Casimir II and Władysław I, Trojden II attended the wedding and coronation of King Władysław II Jagiełło's fourth wife, Sophia of Halshany.

After the death of their father on 21 January 1426 Trojden II and his brothers, not wanting to further weaken their positions and domains with subsequent divisions, decided to co-rule all their paternal inheritance. Another factor could be the difficult relationship with their mother, and after an eventual division of their domains they were forced to give her part of the lands as her dower. Despite the nominal co-rulership of the brothers, they administered separately their parts of the duchy. An analysis of the documents issued by Trojden II showed that he received Płock. On 8 September 1426 he and his brothers Siemowit V and Władysław I paid homage to the Polish King at Sandomierz.

Trojden II died on 25 July 1427, unmarried and without issue. He was probably buried at Płock Cathedral.
