= Władysław II of Płock =

Polish noble

Władysław II of Płock (pl: Władysław II płocki; aft. 31 October 1448 – 27 February 1462), was a Polish prince member of the House of Piast from the Masovian branch. He was a Duke of Płock, Rawa Mazowiecka, Belz, Płońsk, Zawkrze and Wizna during 1455-1461/62 (under regency until 1459) jointly with his brother, since 1459 ruler over Gostynin.

He was the second son of Władysław I of Płock and Anna, daughter of Duke Konrad V of Oleśnica.

== Life ==
After the death of their father on 11/12 December 1455, Władysław II and his brother Siemowit VI inherited their domains; however, because at that moment they are minors, the regency was held by their mother and Paweł Giżycki, Bishop of Płock. The regency lasted until 1459, when Siemowit VI attained his majority and assumed the government and the guardianship of his younger brother. Later in that year, they inherited the district of Gostynin after the death of his aunt Margaret of Racibórz, widow of Siemowit V, who obtained this land after her husband's death as her dower.

After the death of Siemowit VI on 31 December 1461/1 January 1462, Władysław II became in the sole ruler of their paternal domains; however, because he was still a minor, the regency was taken again by the Dowager Duchess Anna and Bishop Paweł of Płock. Unfortunately, less than a month later, Władysław II also died. The sudden death of both princes caused many rumours of poisoning. The charges of murder were directly towards the Castellan of Sochaczew, Gotard of Rybna, who allegedly was offended because the princes deprived him of a country state. This sensational accusations, however, are generally rejected, since was well known that chronicler Jan Długosz (who was a contemporary of the princes) disagreed these rumours. Perhaps the real reason of the death of both brothers in a short space of time was tuberculosis, which, moreover, was the cause of their father's death.

With the death of Władysław II ended the line of the Masovian Piasts founded by Siemowit IV, and this caused that King Casimir IV of Poland legitimately wanted to incorporate all his lands to the crown. This was vigorously opposed by the late princes' aunt Catherine and the majority of the Masovian nobility; at the end, the Polish King was able to annex only Belz, Rawa Mazowiecka and Gostynin, while Płock, Płońsk and Zawkrze were taken by Konrad III the Red, member of the Warsaw line and the closest male relative. In 1476, Dowager Duchess Anna was stripped of her dower, the district of Sochaczew, who was annexed by the Polish Kingdom. The lands taken by the Warsaw Piasts remained in their hands, although King Casimir IV capture the main fortress of Płock and forced the local nobility to paid homage to him. At the end, and for unknown reasons, the King didn't use the force to capture the lands, probably because he found extremely difficult to break the resistance of the local nobility, still deeply attached to the Piast dynasty.
