= Catherine of Masovia =

Polish princess in House of Piast

Catherine of Masovia (Polish: Katarzyna mazowiecka; 1413/16 – between 2 June 1479 and 5 July 1480) was a Polish princess member of the House of Piast in the Masovian branch.

She was the eighth and youngest daughter of Siemowit IV, Duke of Masovia and Alexandra, a daughter of Algirdas, Grand Duke of Lithuania and sister of King Władysław II Jagiełło of Poland.

== Life ==
Before 21 August 1439, Catherine married Michael Žygimantaitis, a Lithuanian prince and contender for the Grand Ducal throne as son of Sigismund Kęstutaitis, as his third wife. His two previous wives were also Masovian princesses: the first was Anna (Catherine's older sister) and the second was Euphemia (sister of Bolesław IV of Warsaw). They had no children.

Thanks to his bonds with the Masovian Piasts, Michael Žygimantaitis counted with the strong support of the courts of Płock and Warsaw and also with the loyalty of the Lithuanian Samogitia; however, by 1447 he was abandoned by all his allies and defeated, was captured and transported to the Grand Duchy of Moscow where he died under unclear circumstances (possibly poisoned).

After the deaths of her nephews Siemowit VI and Władysław II in early 1462, Catherine took control over parts of their domains, and vigorously defended (with the help of the local nobility) the rights of her cousins from the Warsaw line against the annexation plans of the Kingdom of Poland. The last mention of Catherine as a living person was on 2 June 1479. Her burial place is unknown.
