= Siemowit IV of Masovia =

Polish prince

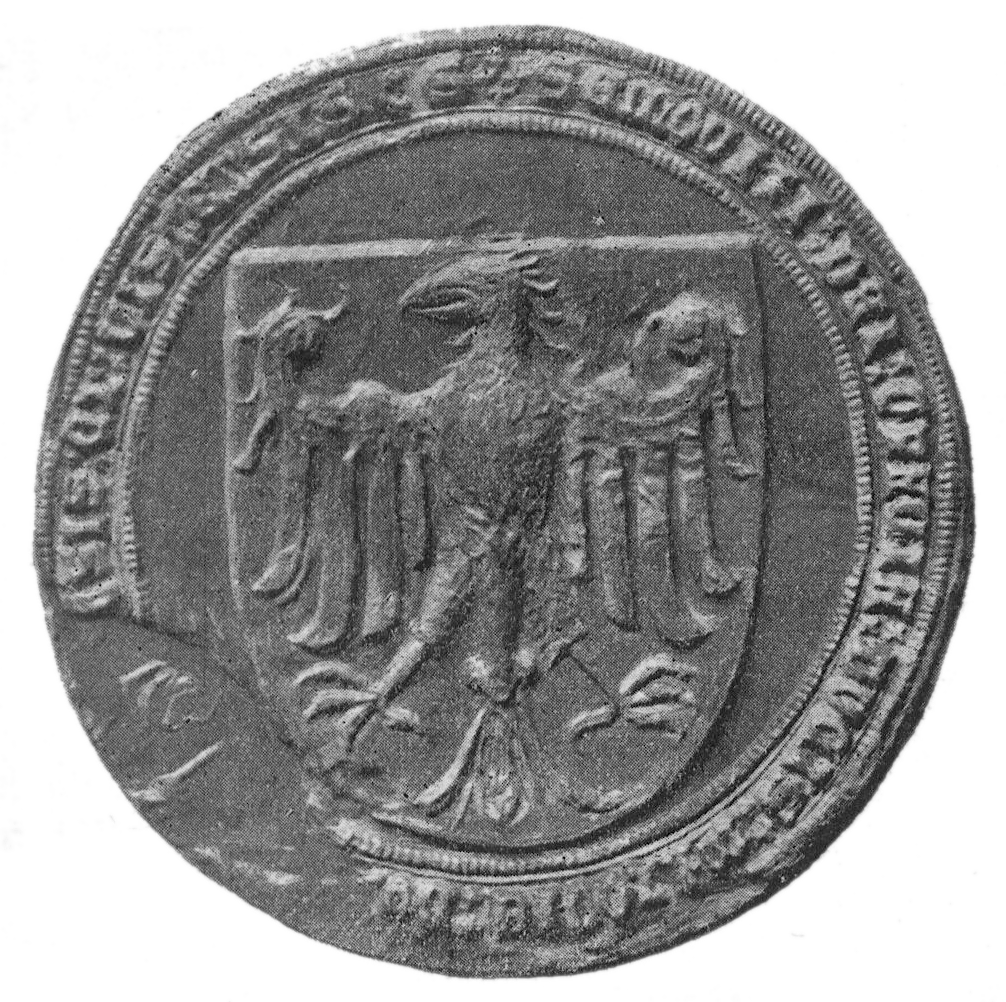
Seal of Siemowit IV

Siemowit IV (Ziemowit IV), also known as Siemowit IV the Younger (Polish: Siemowit IV Młodszy; c. 1353/1356 – 21 January 1426), was a Polish prince, member of the Masovian branch of the House of Piast and from 1373 or 1374 Duke of Rawa, and after the division of the paternal inheritance between him and his brother in 1381, ruler over Rawa, Płock, Sochaczew, Gostynin, Płońsk and Wizna, after 1386 hereditary Polish vassal, after 1388 ruler over Belz. During 1382–1401 he lost Wizna and during 1384–1399 and 1407–1411 he lost Zawkrze, during 1384–1399 he lost Płońsk, which was taken by the Teutonic Order.

He was the second son of Siemowit III, Duke of Masovia and his first wife Euphemia, daughter of Nicholas II of Opava.

Already during his father's lifetime, Siemowit IV received his own district, Rawa Mazowiecka (ca. 1373/74), and as a result of the partition of Masovia between him and his older brother Janusz I after the death of their father on 16 June 1381, Siemowit IV finally obtained the totality of his domains: Rawa, Płock, Sochaczew, Gostynin, Płońsk and Wizna.

== Role in the Greater Polish Civil War ==
Siemowit IV was opposed to his older brother Janusz I's attempts to obtain the Polish crown. One year after the acquisition of his own domains, King Louis of Poland and Hungary died (10 September 1382), and with this emerged the opportunity to enact his claim to the crown, supported by the Greater Poland and Kujawy nobility (centered around the powerful Bartosz Wezenborg). However, the late King had made arrangements among the Lesser Poland nobility who guaranteed their support to his eldest daughter and heiress Mary and her husband Sigismund of Luxembourg. Without waiting for a favorable settlement, in January 1383, Siemowit IV marched to Greater Poland at the head of his troops, marked the beginning of the Greater Poland Civil War.

Unexpectedly, in Buda the Dowager Queen Elizabeth of Bosnia decided to change the decision of her husband and accepted the reign of her youngest daughter Jadwiga over Poland instead of Mary and Sigismund, who remained rulers of Hungary. This decision caused that several supporters of Siemowit IV to hope that he could marry the young Queen (despite the fact that she was already betrothed to William of Habsburg) and in this way, both factions could reconcile and in addition this union with the old Piast dynasty could further legitimize the Angevin rule.

The first step to implement this plan was the formal candidacy of Siemowit IV to the royal crown. To this end, in a meeting of nobles and gentry at Sieradz the Archbishop Bodzanta of Gniezno, one of his leading supporters, proposed Siemowit IV's candidacy to the throne. This proposal quickly gained widespread acceptance, and only thanks to the courageous intervention of the voivode of Kraków John of Tęczyn, who advised them to abstain from any decision until the arrival of Jadwiga, the idea was abandoned. The opposition of Lesser Poland to the candidacy of Siemowit IV was probably associated with the fear of the growing role of Greater Poland under an eventual rule of the Masovian Duke. Another argument against this was the emerging idea of the union with the Grand Duchy of Lithuania.

These events did not discourage Siemowit IV, who was determined to obtain the crown, even by force. Probably with the knowledge and consent of Archbishop Bodzanta, he attempted to abduct Jadwiga and marry her, in a desperate act to win the crown. When the Lesser Poland nobility learned of his intentions, they close the gates of Wawel to Bodzanta's men, with Siemowit IV hidden among them. They also warned Jadwiga, who remained at the court of her mother until it was secure to travel.

Despite the failure of his ambitious plans, Siemowit IV continued his efforts to obtain the Polish throne. For this purpose, after burning the property of his political opponents in Książ, he went back to Sieradz, where a part of the local nobility proclaimed him King of Poland. This time, however, the congress lacked of real authority, and for this reason he delayed his expected coronation, trying to conquer the country by force. After a disastrous campaign and a failed siege of Kalisz (Siemowit IV was able to obtain only Kujawy), some of his supporters decided to sign an armistice on 29 September 1383.

The ceasefire enabled the Polish to add Hungarian troops to the country's forces under the personal command of Sigismund of Luxembourg. The combined attack of Hungarian-Polish forces discouraged Siemowit IV from fighting further, especially after his brother Janusz opted for the recognition of Jadwiga as Queen.

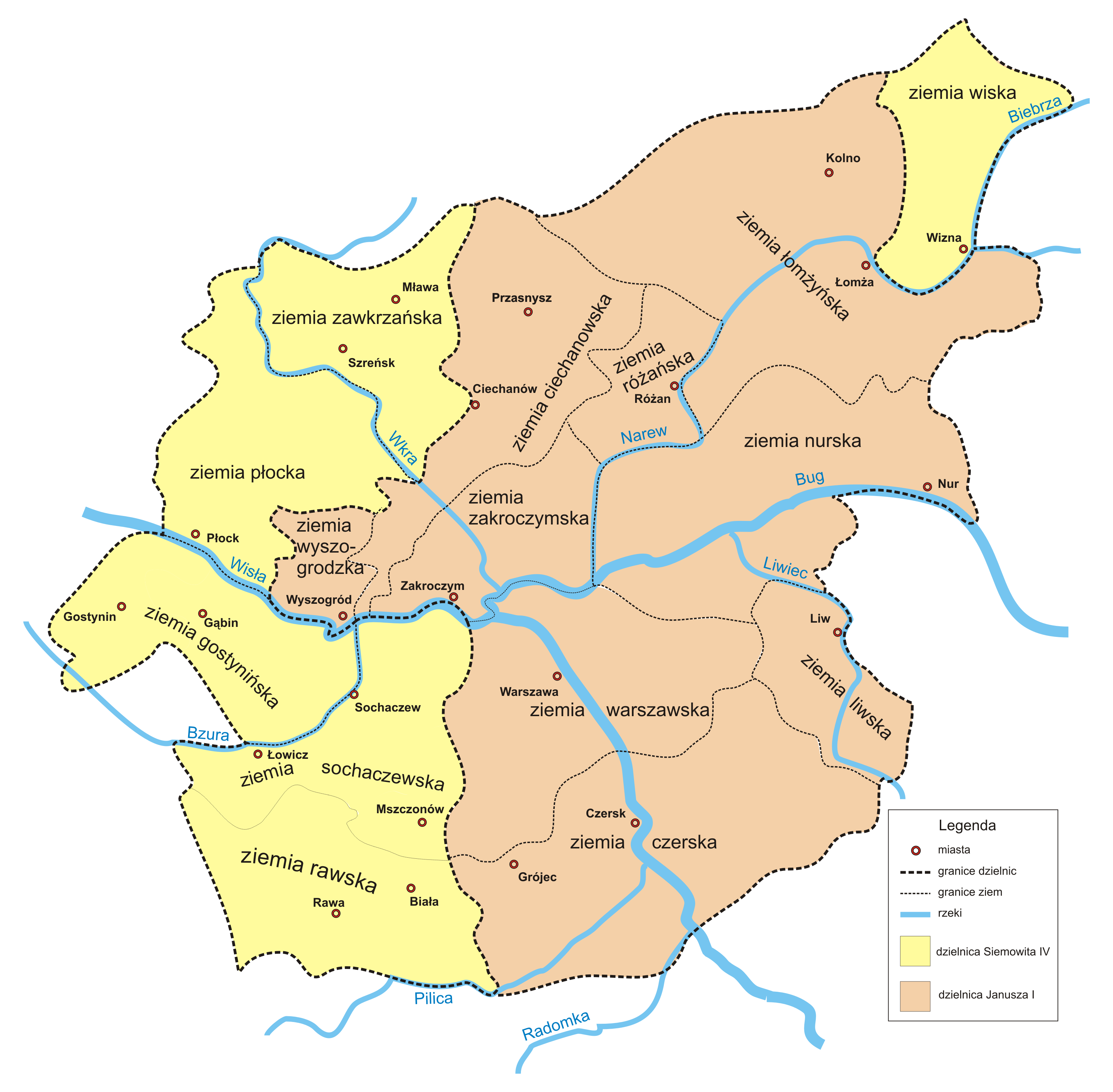
Division of Masovia (1381–1426).

The defeat of Siemowit IV reduced considerably the number of his supporters. After a final rejection in October 1384 from the powerful Lesser Poland nobility to a marriage with Jadwiga, the Masovian Duke adopted a different tactic: trying to conquer as much territory as possible.

== Reconciliation with opponents ==
Siewomit, after adding Łęczyca to his territory, decided to undertake peace negotiations with Jadwiga, which ended successfully on 12 December 1385 with the signing of a treaty, under which Siemowit IV returned all the lands taken by him in exchange for the sum of 10,000 silver marks and most important, he relinquished all his claims to the Polish crown and paid homage to the Queen Jadwiga and her new husband and King, Jogaila, from which he received the Duchy of Belz as dowry of Princess Alexandra of Lithuania, Jogaila's sister, who married Siemowit IV as a gesture of reconciliation between both parties. Siemowit IV's attendance at the ceremonies of Jogaila's baptism as well as his and Jadwiga's marriage and coronation in Kraków marked the full resignation of his claim to the Polish crown. After their crowning, he renewed his homage to the royal couple. He joined the royal entourage to Vilnius, where he participated in the process of Christianization of Lithuania.

== Post civil war activity ==
As an independent ruler before the war, he could effectively maneuver between the Polish, Lithuanians and the Teutons. By the war's end, as a vassal, he was meant to serve as a representative of the Polish Kingdom. In addition, in order to finance his policies he mortgaged multiple times some of his domains to the Teutonic Order, including Wizna (during 1382-1401), Płońsk (during 1384-1399) and Zawkrze (during 1384-1399 and 1407-1411). In view of the growing friction between and the Teutonic Order, Siemowit IV tried to obtain the greatest benefit for him and intervened as a mediator. After the outbreak of the war of 1409–1410 between Poland, Lithuania and the Teutonic Order, the attitude of the Masovian Duke wasn't clear: on one side, he tried to contact King Sigismund of Hungary and on the other, he pressured his warring neighbors to cease fighting. In view of the failure of his attempts to broker a compromise, Siemowit IV finally sent his troops to the Battle of Grunwald, but his participation was only symbolic; in fact, it was his son Siemovit V who fielded two banners of his own troops and fought alongside the royal troops and their Lithuanian allies. In order to maintain friendly relations with the Teutonic Order, he provided them with funds, even during the campaign; in exchange, the Order returned Zawkrze to Siemowit IV, despite the fact that under the Peace of Thorn (1411) they weren't obliged to do it.

Despite his official subordination to Poland, Siemowit IV tried to pursue an independent foreign policy. This was expressed in his frequent contacts with the Hungarian King Sigismund, who, intending to influence a Polish vassal to his side, gave the Masovian Duke the rich prebends from the Bishopric of Veszprém and other possessions across Hungary.

Siemowit IV's relations with Poland, despite some temporary frictions caused by his independent policy (he even minted his own coins) remained friendly, despite the fact that he didn't fulfill his duties as a vassal, and only sent troops to Poland occasionally when he was required to do so. A gesture of friendship with King Władysław II was noted when he married Siemowit IV's daughters into political marriages and the kings support given to the duke's son Alexander in his Church career. In domestic politics, Siemowit IV continued the economic restructuring which begun under the rule of his father. For this purpose, in addition to the existing statutes, he implemented the Kulm law in several of his cities and promoted the colonization of the Masovian nobility to Belz.

== Ill health and death ==
After 1420 Siemowit IV, due to his progressive blindness, gradually resigned participation in the government to his adult sons. In 1425, a dispute about the election of his Chancellor Stanisław z Pawłowic as Bishop of Płock forced his sons Siemowit V and Casimir II into a humiliating surrender. Siemowit IV died on 21 January 1426 at Gostynin and was buried in the Ducal crypt at Płock Cathedral.

== Marriage and issue ==
In 1387, Siemowit IV married Alexandra (died 20 April 1434), a Lithuanian princess, daughter of Algirdas, Grand Duke of Lithuania, and his second wife, Uliana of Tver. They had thirteen children:

- Siemowit V (1389 – 17 February 1442).
- Hedwig (c. 1392 – aft. 19 February 1439), married after 3 January 1410 to Janos Garai, Ban of Uzora and Obergespan of Temes and Pozsega.
- Cymburgis (c. 1394 – 28 September 1429), married on 25 January 1412 to Ernest I, Duke of Austria.
- Euphemia (1395/97 – bef. 17 September 1447), married on 20 November 1412 to Bolesław I, Duke of Cieszyn.
- Amelia (1397/98 – aft. 17 May 1434), married on 16 May 1413 to William II, Margrave of Meissen.
- Alexander (1400 – 2 June 1444), a diplomat and Bishop of Trento, titular Bishop of Chur, titular Cardinal of Damascus, and Patriarch of Aquileia.
- Casimir II (1401/03 – 15 September 1442).
- Trojden II (1403/06 – 25 July 1427).
- Władysław I (1406/09 – 11/12 December 1455).
- Alexandra (1407/10 – c. 1426).
- Maria (1408/15 – 14 February 1454), married on 24 June 1432 to Bogislaw IX, Duke of Pomerania.
- Anna (24 April 1411 – bef. 7 Feb 1435), married bef. 26 May 1427 to Michael Žygimantaitis, a Lithuanian prince.
- Catherine (1413/16 – betw. 2 June 1479/5 July 1480), married bef. 21 August 1439 to Michael Žygimantaitis, a Lithuanian prince (widower of her sister).

Grandchildren of Alexandra and Siemowit IV included Frederick III, Holy Roman Emperor, Przemyslaus II, Duke of Cieszyn, Sophie of Pomerania, Duchess of Pomerania and Dorothy Garai, queen of Bosnia.

Prior to his marriage, Siemowit IV fathered an illegitimate son, Miklusz (also called Mikołaj; born before 1387), who was legitimated on 29 June 1417 by Emperor Sigismund. Nothing more is known about him.
