= Siemowit V of Masovia =

Polish prince and Duke of Masovia (1389–1442)

Siemowit V of Rawa was a Polish prince of the House of Piast from the Masovian branch. He ruled as Duke of Rawa Mazowiecka, Płock, Sochaczew, Gostynin, Płońsk, Wizna, and Belz from 1426 to 1434 with his brothers, and after the 1434 division of their inheritance, solely over Rawa Mazowiecka, Gostynin, and Sochaczew.

== Early life ==
He was born in 1389, the eldest son of Siemowit IV, Duke of Masovia and Alexandra of Lithuania, daughter of Algirdas. He died on February 17, 1442.

Siemowit V spent his early years at King Władysław II Jagiełło’s court in Kraków. In 1410, he fought in the Battle of Grunwald alongside the Polish king. In 1416, he joined the king’s entourage at the Council of Constance and a meeting with Sigismund of Luxembourg in Kežmarok.

After 1420, Siemowit IV’s increasing blindness led him to delegate governance to his eldest sons, Siemowit V and Casimir II, whome he named co-rulers. In 1425, Siemowit V faced a challenge in Brest-Litovsk, where on November 14, he and his brother vowed loyalty to the Polish crown amid controversy over Stanisław z Pawłowic’s appointment as Bishop of Płock.

== Ruler ==
Siemowit IV died on January 21, 1426, leaving his domains to his four sons: Siemowit V, Casimir II, Trojden II (died 1427), and Władysław I. A fifth son, Alexander, pursued a Church career. To avoid weakening their domains, the brothers co-ruled their inheritance. On September 8, 1426, in Sandomierz, they paid homage to King Władysław II, though Casimir II delayed until 1430.

Relations with the Polish crown remained tense due to conflicts with Bishop Stanisław z Pawłowic, a loyalist of Władysław II. The brothers accused the bishop of despotism and forging documents alleging their plot to kill the king. Despite appeals to the Teutonic Order, the Pope, and King Sigismund, the court acquitted the bishop.

In 1429, Siemowit V attended the Congress of Lutsk, where King Sigismund proposed elevating Vytautas to King of Lithuania. During the 1431 war between Poland and Švitrigaila, Siemowit V led Polish troops, securing a truce on September 2, 1431, and receiving the Zhydachiv district near Volhynia as a reward.

In 1432, Siemowit V negotiated with the Teutonic Order in Działdowo and Švitrigaila in Vilnius for an anti-Polish alliance. Švitrigaila’s removal from power in Lithuania ended these talks, possibly with Władysław II’s tacit approval, as Siemowit V maintained good relations with the crown. His strained ties with the Teutonic Order led to frequent contact with the Duchy of Pomerania and participation in the 1433 Hussite expedition in Pomerelia.

After Władysław II’s death in 1434, Siemowit V sought the Polish crown with Spytek of Melsztyn’s support, opposing Bishop Zbigniew Oleśnicki of Kraków. At a July 13, 1434, meeting in Opatów, Oleśnicki defended the late king’s heirs, leading Siemowit V to abandon his candidacy. He and Casimir II attended Władysław III’s coronation on July 25, despite conflicts with Oleśnicki over precedence.

On August 31, 1434, Siemowit IV’s sons divided their duchy, with Siemowit V receiving Rawa Mazowiecka, Gostynin, and Sochaczew. His political activity diminished thereafter. He signed the Peace of Brześć Kujawski on December 31, 1435. In April 1438, he joined the Confederation of Nowy Korczyn, and with the other nobles urged Władysław III to reject the Bohemian crown for his brother Prince Casimir.

Siemowit V died on February 17, 1442, and was buried in the Church of St. Peter and Paul in Rawa Mazowiecka.

== Marriage and issue ==
Between 15 October 1434 and 17 February 1437, Siemowit V married Margareta (1410 - 5 July 1459), a daughter of John II, Duke of Opava-Racibórz and widow of Casimir I of Oświęcim. They had one daughter:

- Margareta (1436/40 - bet. 5 May 1483/1 September 1485), married bet. 1447/53 to Konrad IX the Black, Duke of Oleśnica.

After his death without male offspring, mostly of his domains where inherited by his brother Władysław I, except Gostynin, who was given to his widow as dower.
