= Alexandra of Lithuania =

Lithuanian princess (died 1434)

- Duchess consort of Masovia
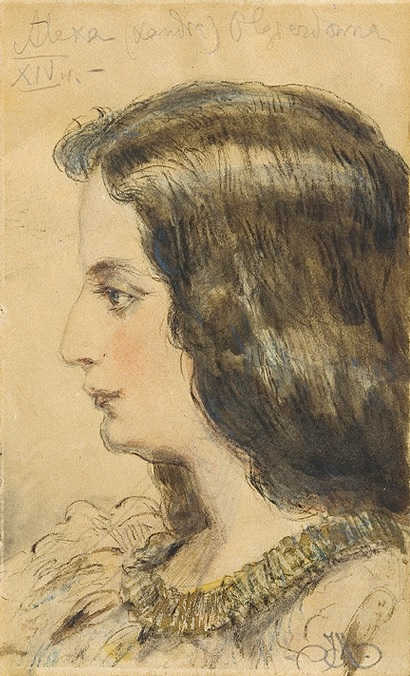
- Portrait fantasy by Jan Matejko
- Born: late 1360s or early 1370s
- Died: 20 April 1434; Płock
- Noble family: Gediminids (by birth); House of Piast (by marriage)
- Spouse: Siemowit IV, Duke of Masovia
- Issue: Kazimierz II of Masovia; Trojden II of Masovia; Władysław I of Płock; Siemowit V of Masovia; Alexander of Masovia; Euphemia of Masovia; Cymburgis of Masovia; Jadwiga of Masovia; Amelia of Masovia; Anna of Masovia; Maria of Masovia; Alexandra of Masovia; Catherine of Masovia
- Father: Algirdas
- Mother: Uliana of Tver

Alexandra (Polish: Aleksandra, Lithuanian: Aleksandra; died 20 April 1434 in Płock) was the youngest daughter of Algirdas, Grand Duke of Lithuania, and his second wife, Uliana of Tver. Though Alexandra's exact date of birth is not known, it is thought that she was born in the late 1360s or early 1370s. In 1387, she married Siemowit IV, Duke of Masovia, and had thirteen children with him.

== Life ==
On 12 December 1385, a few months after the Union of Krewo, Siemowit IV, Duke of Masovia, reached a compromise with Queen Jadwiga of Poland and her intended consort, King Jogaila (Władysław II Jagiełło), the brother of Alexandra. Siemowit IV agreed to cease his rival claims to the Kingdom of Poland, pay homage to Jadwiga and Jogaila, and to assume the position of a hereditary vassal to the Polish crown in exchange for 10,000 Prague groschen and a fief (the Duchy of Belz). The agreement was solidified by the marriage of Siemowit IV and Alexandra in 1387.

Alexandra died at the age of about 65 and was buried in Płock. Her final resting place is likely a church of the Dominican Order.

== Issue ==
Alexandra was frequently pregnant during her union with Siemowit, giving birth to 13 children- five sons and eight daughters- in about 25 years.

- Siemowit V (1389 – 17 February 1442).
- Hedwig (c. 1392 – aft. 19 February 1439), married after 3 January 1410 to Janos Garai, Ban of Uzora and Obergespan of Temes and Pozsega.
- Cymburgis (c. 1394 – 28 September 1429), married on 25 January 1412 to Ernest I, Duke of Austria.
- Euphemia (1395/97 – bef. 17 September 1447), married on 20 November 1412 to Bolesław I, Duke of Cieszyn.
- Amelia (1397/98 – aft. 17 May 1434), married on 16 May 1413 to William II, Margrave of Meissen.
- Alexander (1400 – 2 June 1444), a diplomat and Bishop of Trento, titular Bishop of Chur, titular Cardinal of Damascus, and Patriarch of Aquileia.
- Casimir II (1401/03 – 15 September 1442).
- Trojden II (1403/06 – 25 July 1427).
- Władysław I (1406/09 – 11/12 December 1455).
- Alexandra (1407/10 – c. 1426), died unmarried.
- Maria (1408/15 – 14 February 1454), married on 24 June 1432 to Bogislaw IX, Duke of Pomerania.
- Anna (24 April 1411 – bef. 7 Feb 1435), married bef. 26 May 1427 to Michael Žygimantaitis, a Lithuanian prince.
- Catherine (1413/16 – betw. 2 June 1479/5 July 1480), married bef. 21 August 1439 to Michael Žygimantaitis, a Lithuanian prince (widower of her sister).

Grandchildren of Alexandra and Siemowit IV included Frederick III, Holy Roman Emperor, Przemyslaus II, Duke of Cieszyn, Sophie of Pomerania, Duchess of Pomerania and Dorothy Garai.

== Sources ==
- Karol Piotrowicz, w: Polski Słownik Biograficzny/ Polish Biographical Dictionary. T. 1. Kraków: Polska Akademia Umiejętności – Skład Główny w Księgarniach Gebethnera i Wolffa, 1935, p. 66–67
