= Alexander of Masovia =

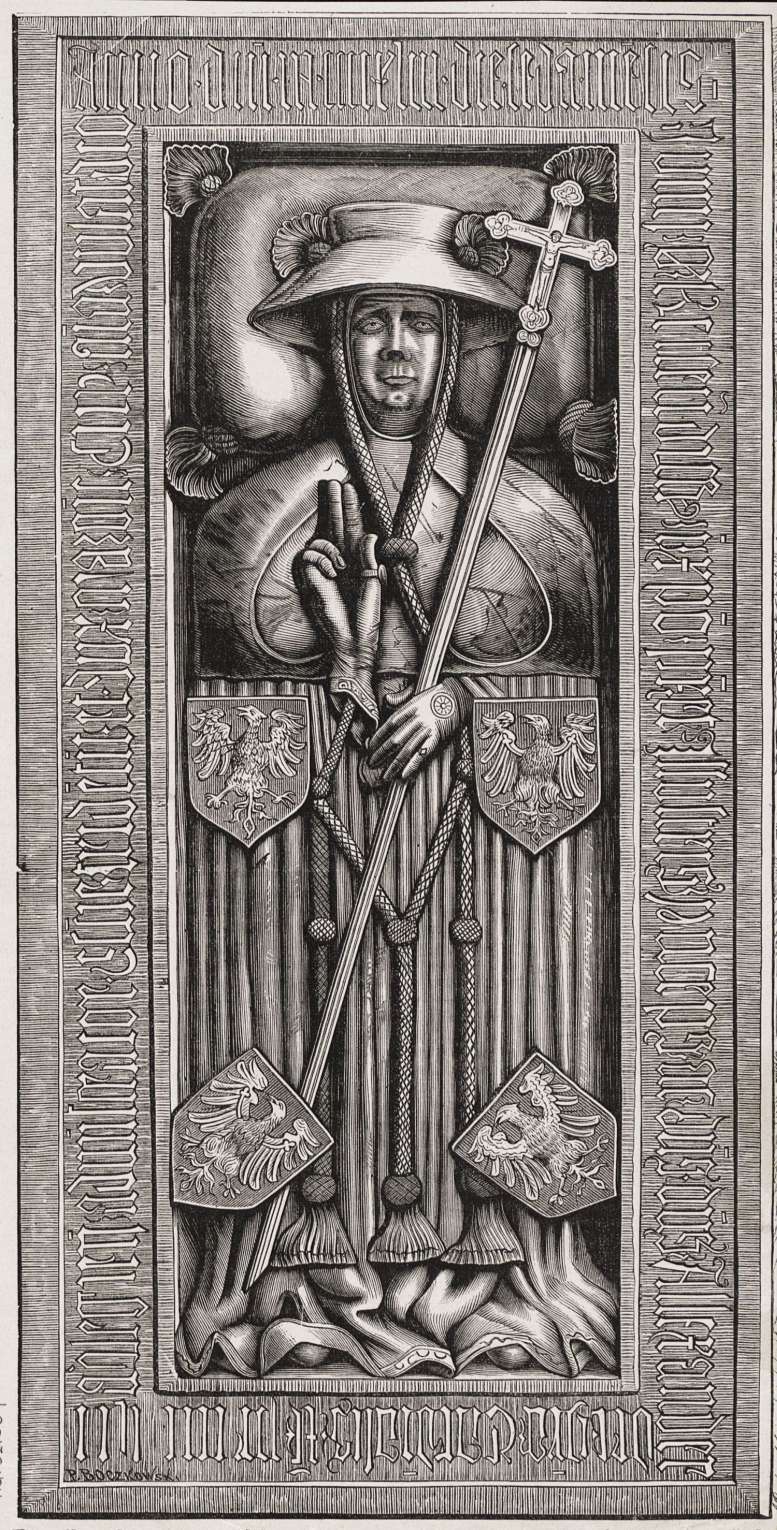
- Alexander's tomb effigy in St. Stephen's Cathedral, Vienna

Prince-Bishop of Trento
- Reign: 1424–1444
- Predecessor: Henry IV Flechtel
- Successor: Benedict of Trento
- Born: 1400
- Died: 2 June 1444; Vienna
- Burial: St. Stephen's Cathedral, Vienna
- House: Piast
- Father: Siemowit IV, Duke of Masovia
- Mother: Alexandra of Lithuania
- Religion: Catholic

Alexander of Masovia (Polish: Aleksander mazowiecki; 1400 - 2 June 1444) was a Polish prince member of the House of Piast from the Masovian branch. He was Bishop of Trento since 1425, titular Patriarch of Aquileia since 1439, Cardinal nominated by Antipope Felix V as titular of the diocese of St. Lawrence at Damascus (San Lorenzo in Damaso) since 1440, titular Bishop of Chur since 1442 and rector at St. Stephen's Cathedral, Vienna since 1442, a diplomat.

He was the second son of Siemowit IV, Duke of Masovia and Alexandra of Lithuania, daughter of Algirdas.

== Life ==
=== Beginning of his ecclesiastical career. Under the care of King Władysław II Jagiełło ===
Despite being the second son of his family, from early childhood Alexander was destined for a Church career. To this end, he was sent at the court of his maternal uncle, King Władysław II Jagiełło at Kraków, where under his tutelage begin his studies. Thanks to the royal protection, in 1414 he was already named Provost at Gniezno Cathedral.

During 1415-1422, Alexander assisted at the University of Kraków, where, however, wasn't an excellent student. In any case, he was unable to finish any study. Nevertheless, at the end of 1422 and thanks to being a relative of the King, he was elected honorary rector, which was contrary to the university laws.

In 1422 Władysław II Jagiełło made an unsuccessful attempt to appointed Alexander in the Bishopric of Poznań. However, the King wasn't discouraged by the failure and the following year, he managed to obtain from Pope Martin V a different diocese to him, Trento, who was located on the border between Italy and Germany. Only then Alexander decided to be ordained as priest and went on the long journey to his new diocese.

=== Bishop of Trento ===
Alexander arrived to the capital of his diocese on 25 June 1424; however, for unknown reasons his formal ordination as bishop took place only one year later, on 27 September 1425. As Bishop of Trento, he became the ruler of land strategically located on route in the foothills of the Alps.

The bishopric was widely ambitioned by his powerful neighbors, the Habsburg rulers of Tyrol, which were formally vassals of both Trento and Venice. Besides, the choice of a bishop from a far country was a big surprise for the local people and they had to accept that their new ruler would be surrounded by Polish. The choice of Alexander as bishop probably never happened if previously his sister Cymburgis had married with the Habsburg Duke Ernest I of Austria.

It is probable that the Wokabularz trydencki, the oldest preserved Latin-Polish dictionary, was made by orders of Alexander during his tenure as Bishop of Trento.

=== Political Independence and cooperation with Sigismund of Luxembourg ===
In order to maintain a relative political independence, Alexander decided to approach to the King of Germany and Hungary, Sigismund of Luxembourg, who began to politically support him. To this end, the Bishop went to Sigismund's court at Buda, from where he began tu rule his diocese.

In 1431 he took part in the expedition of Sigismund to Italy in order to obtain the imperial crown. For unknown reasons, Alexander decided not being directly involved in Sigismund's coronation at Rome, but remained in Milan, where Sigismund was also crowned King of Italy.

In subsequent years, Alexander was politically engaged in the struggle between the supporters of the primacy of the Pope over supporters of the primacy of the Council of Florence, definitely opting for the latter.

With the help of Emperor Sigismund, in 1435 he was able to finally resolve the conflict with Tyrolean ruler Frederick IV: Alexander agreed to recognize the overlordship of Tyrol in return for which was guaranteed the territorial integrity of his Bishopric.

Shortly after, his active foreign policy and the designation of several Polish in several of the Bishopric offices, caused the rebellion of the local clergy, and almost lost the power. Only with the help of Emperor Sigismund, Alexander managed to keep the control over Trento.

In 1438, Alexander entered into an alliance with Filippo Maria Visconti, Duke of Milan. This treaty did not held little benefit to Alexander; he was entangled in a war against Venice between 1440-1441.

=== Dispute with the Papacy and support to Antipope Felix V ===
Alexander's support to the Council of Florence (he even personally attended in the sessions at Basel in 1433, 1434 and 1442), brought him in December 1439 the title of Patriarch of Aquileia, while he kept the dignity of Bishop of Trento. Antipope Felix V didn't have sufficient support to implement this decision, while his opponent, Pope Eugene IV appointed to this office another candidate who actually won the power, Ludovico Trevisan. Soon after, the Council and Felix V (in order to bring the Jagiellonians and Habsburgs to their side), granted Alexander the title of Cardinal with the diocese of St. Lawrence at Damascus (12 October 1440), the Swiss Bishopric of Chur (March 1442) and finally the rectory of St. Stephen's Cathedral in Vienna. From all this appointments, Alexander was able to really take possession only of the St. Stephen's rectory.

In addition to this rich prebends, he also received from the council important diplomatic missions, but the war against Venice prevented him to participate in the Sejms of Nuremberg and Mainz, or in the disputes between Austria and Poland for the Bohemian throne.

=== The Anti-Turkish expedition. Death ===
In 1442 he arrived to Vienna, where he clashed with Eugene IV's envoy, Cardinal Julian Cesarini, who tried to encourage the local ruler, King Frederick IV of Germany to join into an anti-Turkish crusade. Being appointed by Felix V as Legate to Austria, Hungary and Poland, Alexander successfully managed to convince the German King from the unreality of these ideas. The discussion was so fierce that the Piast prince even punched Cardinal Cesarini.

After this, Alexander planned a trip to Hungary, where he hoped to persuade King Władysław III about the unreasonability of a war against the Turks. Unfortunately, during the preparations for the trip, he suddenly became ill and died on 2 June 1444. He was buried at St. Stephen's Cathedral in Vienna, where in the left of the Chancel in Frauenchor still remained his beautiful tombstone built into a wall.

== Bibliography ==
- Jan Władysław Woś: Beschwerden der Bürger von Trient über ihren Bischof Alexander von Masowien, “Zeitschrift für Ostforschung”, Jahr 38 (1989), 3. Heft, pp. 364–375.
- Jan Władysław Woś: Alessandro di Masovia vescovo di Trento (1423-1444). Un profilo introduttivo, Trento, Civis, 1990.
- Jan Władysław Woś: Alessandro di Masovia vescovo-principe di Trento (1423-1444). Un profilo introduttivo, Pisa, Giardini, 1994.
- Jan Władysław Woś: Alessandro di Masovia, vescovo di Trento e patriarca di Aquileia (1400-1444), Trento; Roma, Editrice Università degli Studi di Trento; Istituto Polacco di Roma, 1998.
- Jan Władysław Woś: Aleksander Mazowiecki – biskup trydencki (1423-1444), “Saeculum Christianum”, 6th year (1999), nr 2, pp. 17–31.
- Teresa Michałowska: Średniowiecze. Warszawa: Wydawnictwo Naukowe PWN, 1995, pp. 331–332, seria: Wielka Historia Literatury Polskiej. ISBN 83-01-11452-5.
- Karol Piotrowicz in: Polish Biographical Dictionary. vol. 1: Kraków: Polish Academy of Learning – Gebethner and Wolff Editorial, 1935, pp. 64–65. Reprint: National Ossoliński Institute, Kraków 1989.
