= Michael Žygimantaitis =

Lithuanian noble (died 1452)

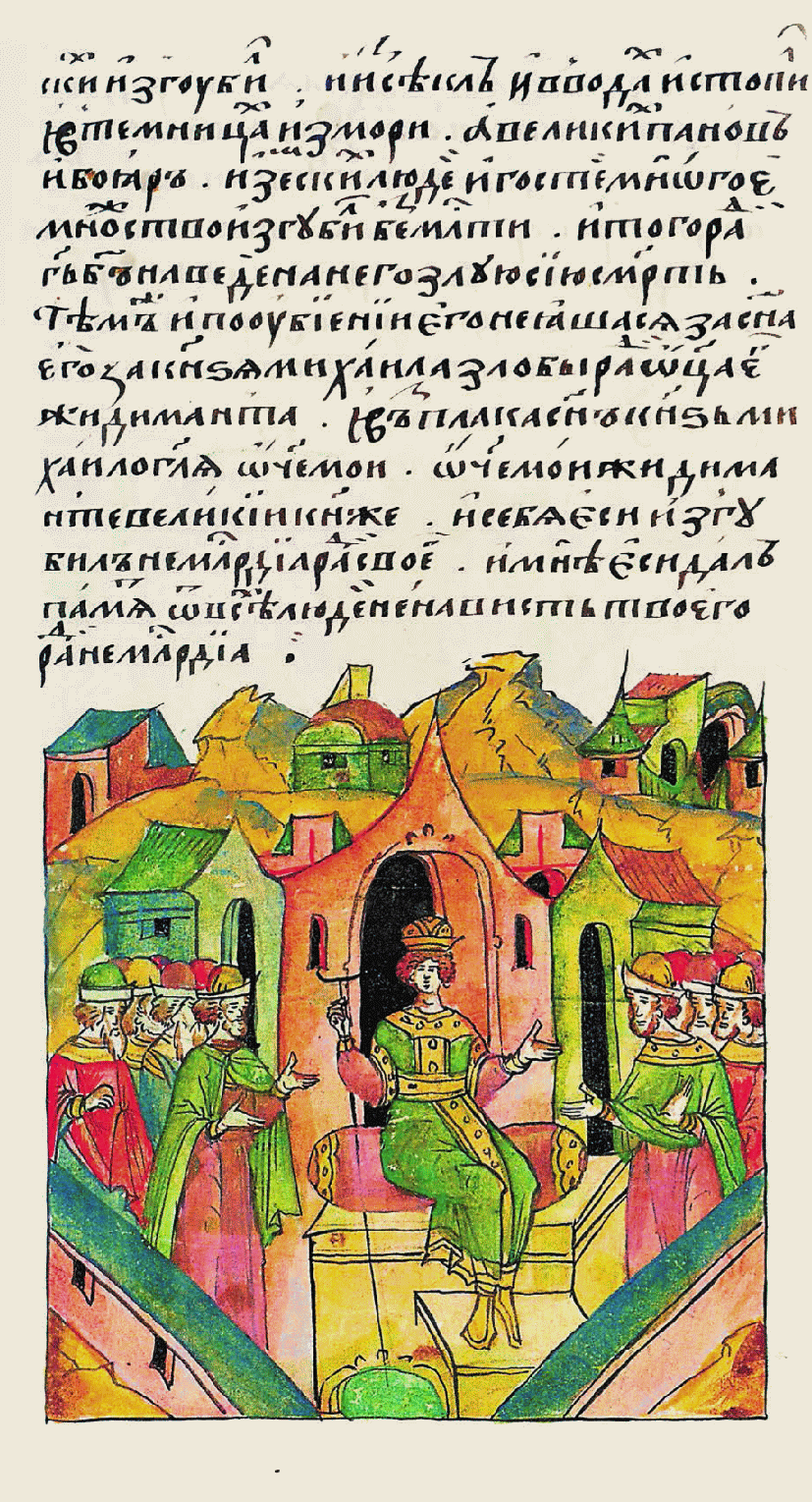
Prince Michael (as depicted in the Illustrated Chronicle of Ivan the Terrible)

Michael Žygimantaitis (Lithuanian: Mykolas Žygimantaitis; Polish: Michał Bolesław Zygmuntowicz; before 1406 – shortly before February 10, 1452) was a pretender to the throne of the Grand Duchy of Lithuania and the last male descendant of Kęstutis, Grand Duke of Lithuania.

== Life ==
He supported his father Sigismund Kęstutaitis in power struggles with Švitrigaila. In 1435, he led his father's army to victory in the Battle of Wiłkomierz. After his father's assassination in 1440, Michael unsuccessfully fought against Casimir IV Jagiellon for the title of Grand Duke of Lithuania. At first, Michael was supported by Samogitia, but in 1441, Casimir issued a privilege confirming Samogitia's semi-autonomous status and thus avoiding a civil war. Until 1447, he was supported by the Dukes of Masovia. In 1448, Michael asked for help from the Crimean Khanate. With their help, he attacked and shortly took control of Kiev, Starodub, and Novhorod-Siversky. Soon he was captured and transported to the Grand Principality of Moscow, where he died under unclear circumstances (possibly poisoned) in 1452. He was buried in Vilnius Cathedral.

At different times, Michael was married to two daughters of Alexandra of Lithuania and Siemowit IV, Duke of Masovia: Anna and Catherine. In total, he had three wives, all from Masovia: Anna (died in 1435), Eufemia (died in 1436) daughter of Bolesław Januszowic, and Catherine (died in 1479/80).
