= Cymburgis of Masovia =

- Duchess of Austria
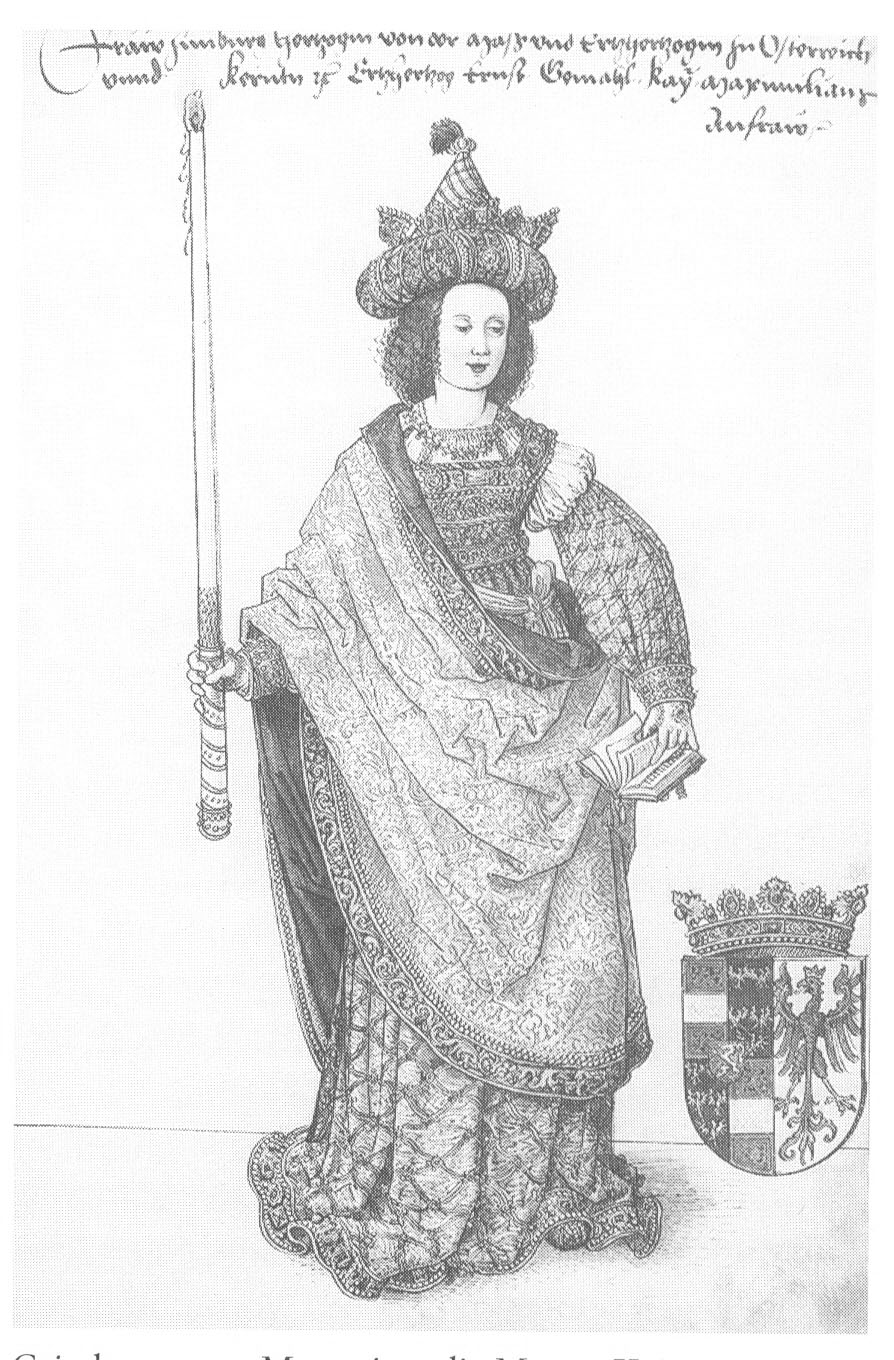
- 15th-century depiction of Cymburgis
- Reign: 1412–1424
- Born: 1394 or 1397; Warsaw, Masovia
- Died: 28 September 1429 (aged 34-35 or 31-32); Türnitz, Austria
- Burial: Lilienfeld Abbey
- Spouse: Ernest, Duke of Austria (m. 1412; died 1424)
- Issue: Frederick III, Holy Roman Emperor; Margaret; Albert VI, Archduke of Austria; Alexander of Austria; Rudolf of Austria; Catherine of Austria; Leopold of Austria; Anna of Austria; Ernest of Austria
- House: Piast dynasty
- Father: Siemowit IV, Duke of Masovia
- Mother: Alexandra of Lithuania

Cymburgis of Masovia (Polish: Cymbarka mazowiecka; German: Cimburgis von Masowien; 1394 or 1397 – 28 September 1429), also spelled Zimburgis or Cimburga, was a Princess of Masovia of the Polish Piast dynasty and a Duchess of Austria from 1412 until 1424, by her marriage with the Habsburg duke Ernest the Iron. As the mother of later Emperor Frederick III, Cymburgis, after Gertrude of Hohenberg, became the second female ancestor of all later Habsburgs, as only her husband's Ernestine branch of the family survived in the male line.

== Life ==
She was the second daughter of Duke Siemowit IV, a scion of the Masovian branch of the Piasts, and his consort Alexandra, a daughter of Grand Duke Algirdas of Lithuania from the dynasty of Gediminids and sister of King Władysław II Jagiełło of Poland.

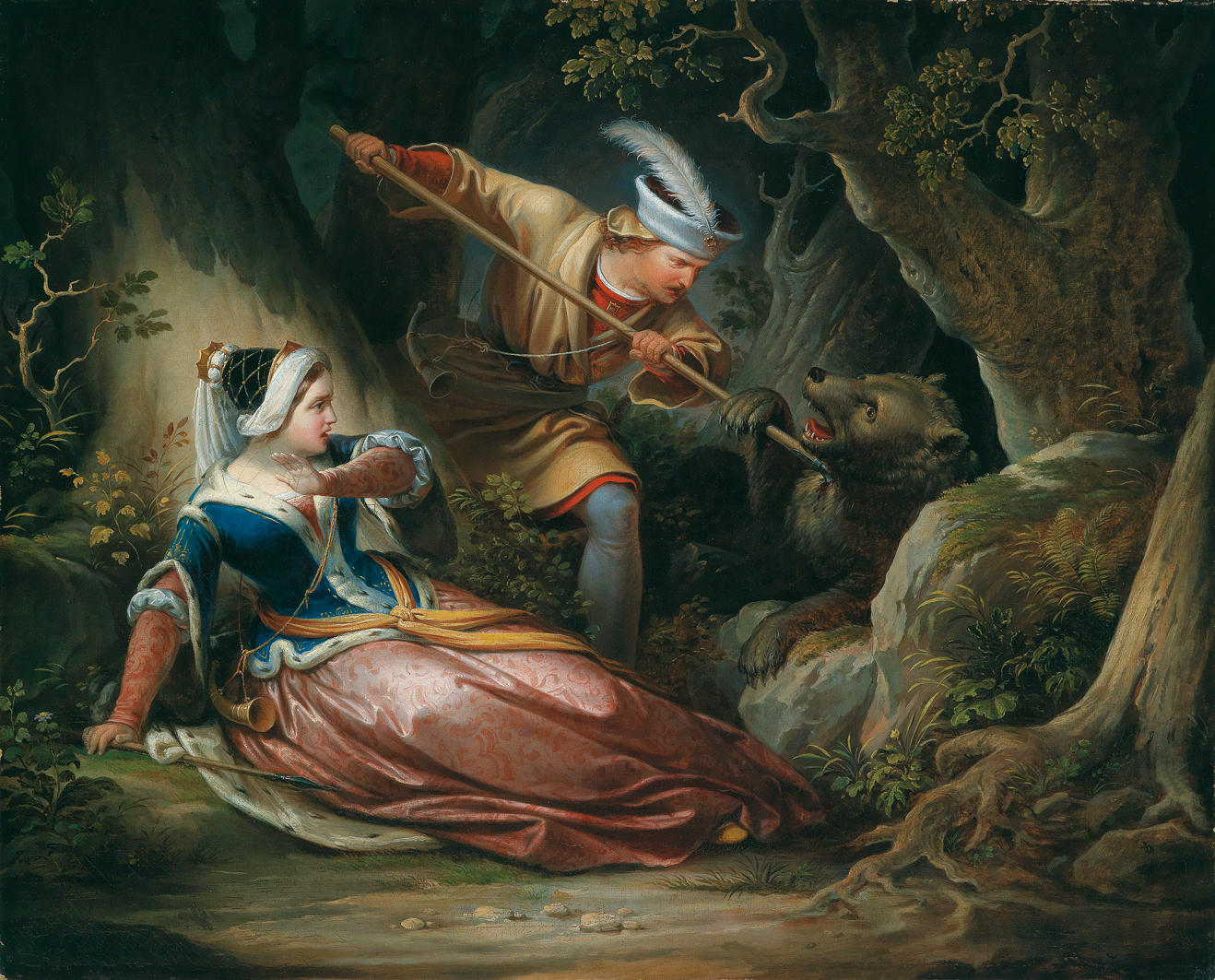
The Brave Saviour, historical painting by Franz Geyling (1856)

Though his elder brother William's engagement with the Polish princess Jadwiga had mortifyingly failed, Duke Ernest the Iron, after the death of his first wife Margaret of Pomerania, proceeded to Kraków in disguise to court Cymburgis. According to legend, he won her love when he participated in a royal hunt and saved the princess from an attacking bear. Actually, her uncle King Władysław II, stuck in the Polish–Lithuanian–Teutonic War and struggling with the Luxembourg king Sigismund of Hungary took the occasion to strengthen ties with the Habsburg dynasty and gave his consent.

The wedding took place on 25 January 1412 in Buda (German: Ofen), the residence of King Sigismund, in connection with Sigismunde hosti the peace negotiations between Poland and the Teutonic Order. after the Peace of Thorn (1411). where lavish feasts, tournaments, and hunts were organized. Present at the wedding were not only Cymburgis parents Siemowit and Alexandra, but also other notable guests like the bride's maternal uncle Władysław II Jagiełło, with Anna of Cilli, but also Vytautas, Grand Duke of Lithuania, Barbara of Cilli and Sigismund Korybut.

Though not approved by the Habsburg family, the marriage turned out to be a happy one. Upon the death of his brothers William and Leopold IV, Ernest became the sole ruler of the Inner Austrian territories, while his cousin Albert V ruled over the Duchy of Austria proper.

Although controversial, it has been claimed (since at least by Robert Burton in 1621) that she brought the distinctive protruding lower lip (prognathism) into the family, a particular physical characteristic of most members of the family for many generations until the 18th century. It can even be recognized in some of her distant descendants (though not as markedly) as King Alfonso XIII of Spain (1886–1941).

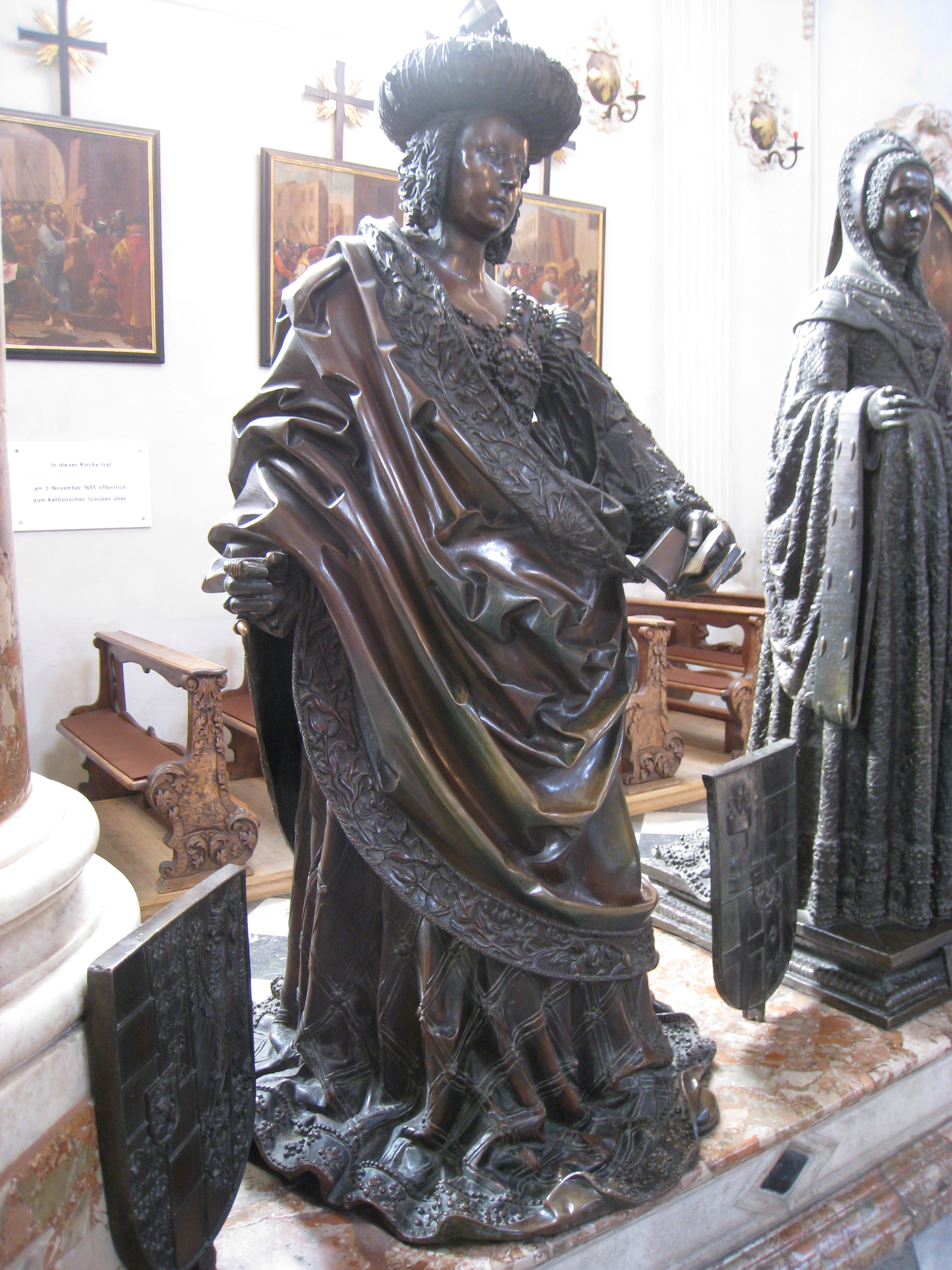
Statue of Cymburgis at the Innsbruck Hofkirche

Tradition has it that she was also known for her exceptional strength, which, for example, she showed by driving nails into the wall with her bare hands and cracking nuts between her fingers. Cymburgis outlived her husband and died on a pilgrimage to Mariazell while staying at Türnitz (in present-day Lower Austria). She is buried at Lilienfeld Abbey.

== Issue ==
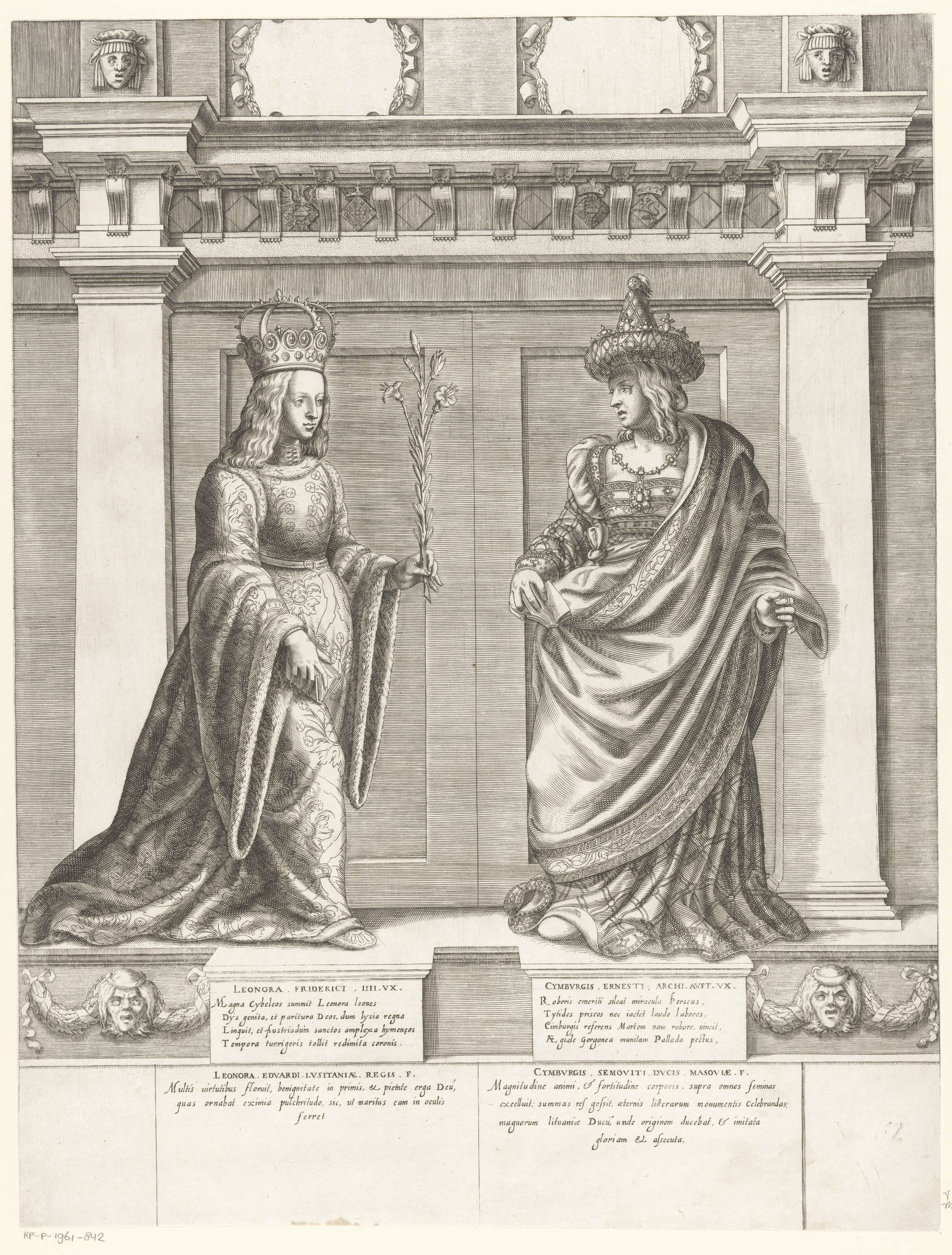
Double portrait of Eleanor of Portugal and Cymburgis of Masovia (on the right) from the book Austriacae gentis imaginum, 1573

Cymburgis was constantly pregnant during her marriage to Ernest, giving birth to nine children in just nine years, of whom only four survived childhood:

1. Frederick III, Holy Roman Emperor (b. Innsbruck, 21 September 1415 – d. Linz, 19 August 1493).
2. Margaret of Austria (b. Wiener Neustadt, 1416 – d. Altenburg, 12 February 1486), married Frederick II, Elector of Saxony.
3. Albert VI, Archduke of Austria (b. Vienna, 18 December 1418 – d. Vienna, 2 December 1463).
4. Catherine of Austria (b. Wiener Neustadt, 1420 – Schloss Hohenbaden, 11 September 1493), married Charles I, Margrave of Baden-Baden.
5. Ernest II of Austria (b. Wiener Neustadt, 1420 – d. Wiener Neustadt, 10 August 1432), died in childhood.
6. Alexandra of Austria (b. and d. Wiener Neustadt, 1421).
7. Anna of Austria (b. Wiener Neustadt, 1422 – d. Wiener Neustadt, 11 November 1429), died in childhood.
8. Leopold of Austria (b. and d. Wiener Neustadt, 1424).
9. Rudolph of Austria (b. and d. Wiener Neustadt, 1424).

== Cymburgis in media ==
Cymburgis of Masovia is referenced to in the Maximilian miniseries.

In the Polish historical drama Korona królów (2018) season 4, she is depicted by the actress Aniela Płudowska.

=== Footnotes ===
Cymburgis of Masovia Piast dynasty Born: 1394/1397 Died: 28 September 1429
Royal titles
Preceded by Margaret of Pomerania	Duchess consort of Austria; 25 January 1412 – 10 June 1424	Succeeded by Eleanor of Portugal
