= Zawkrze =

Polish historic region

Coordinates: 53°07′00″N 20°22′00″E

- Historical region
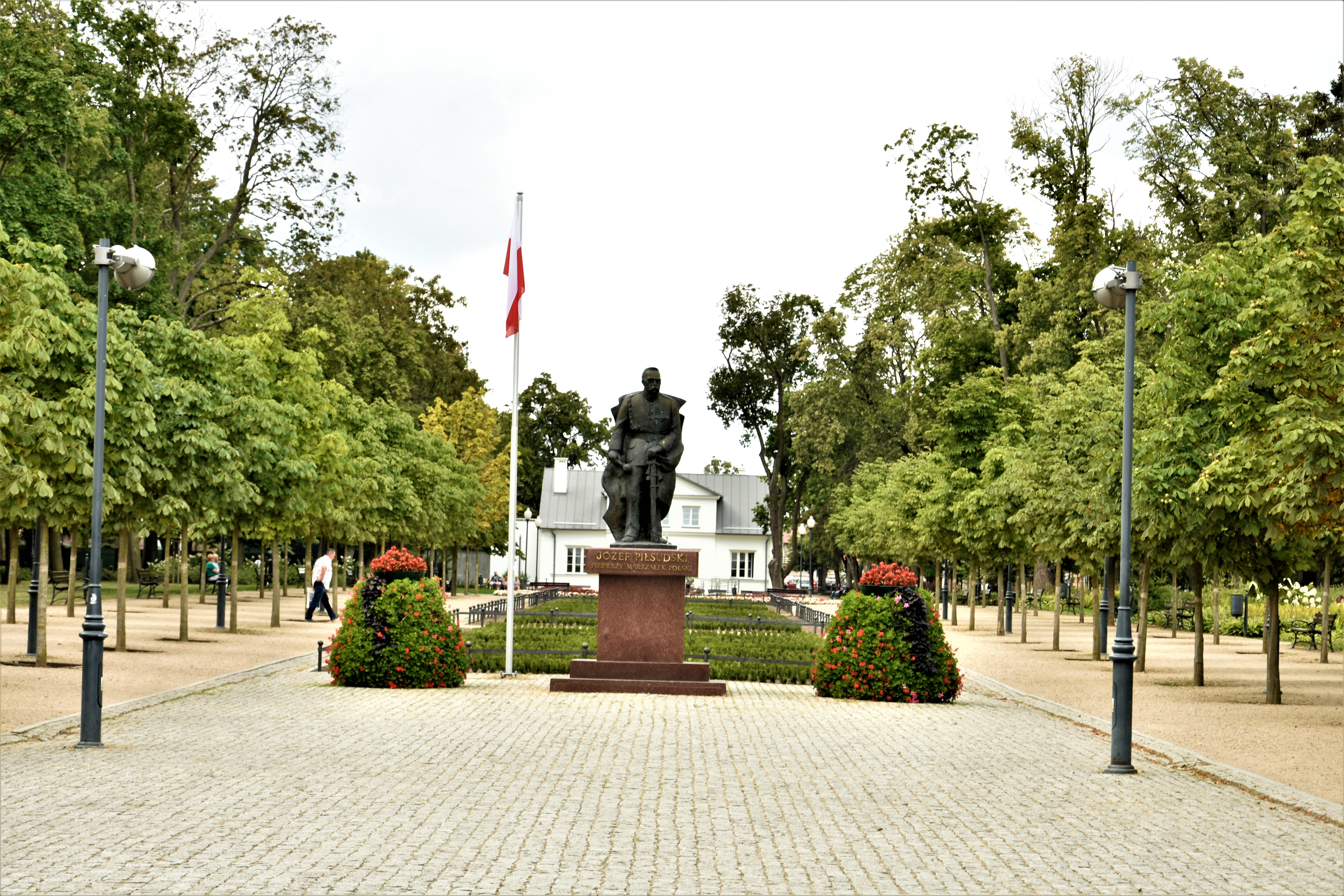
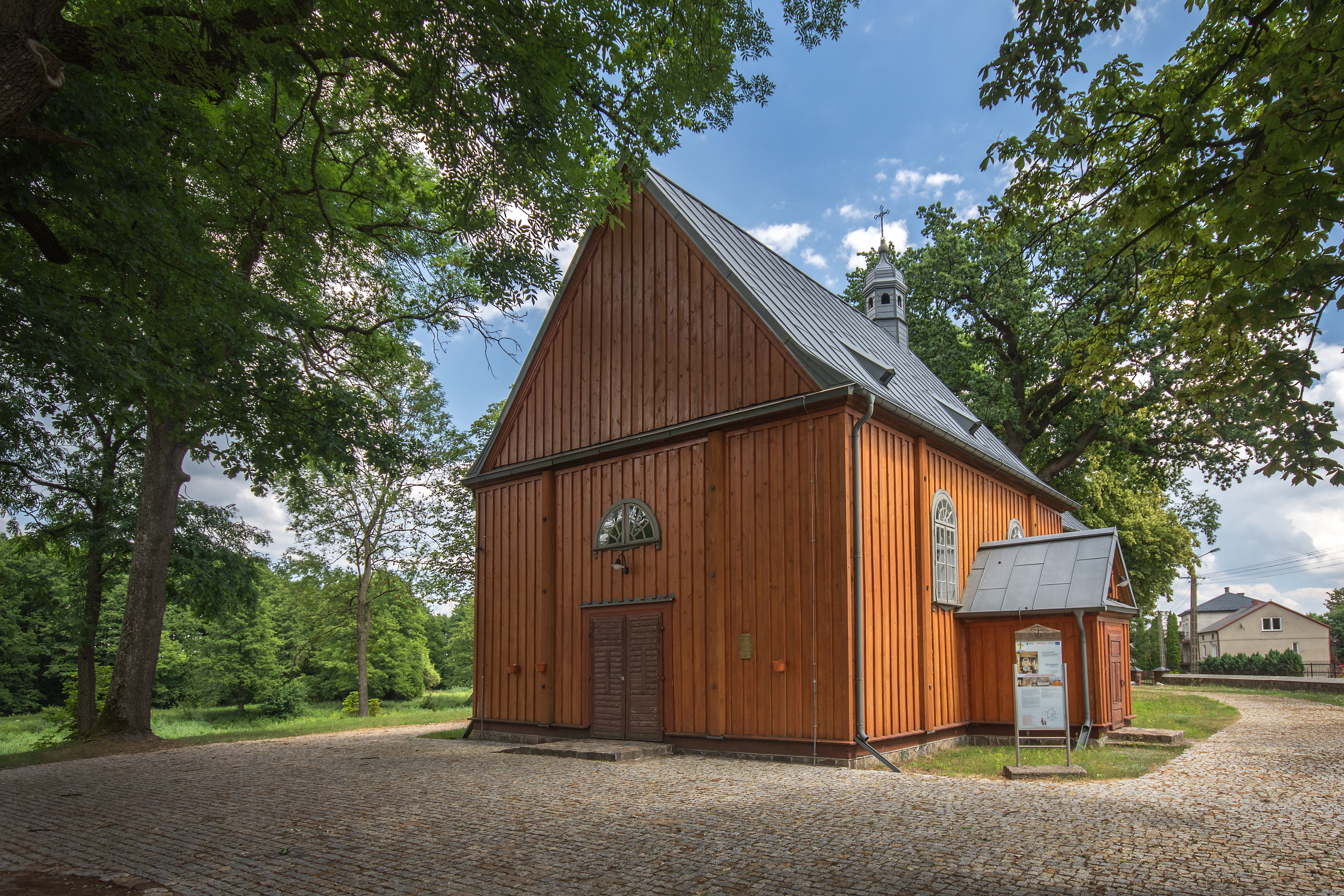
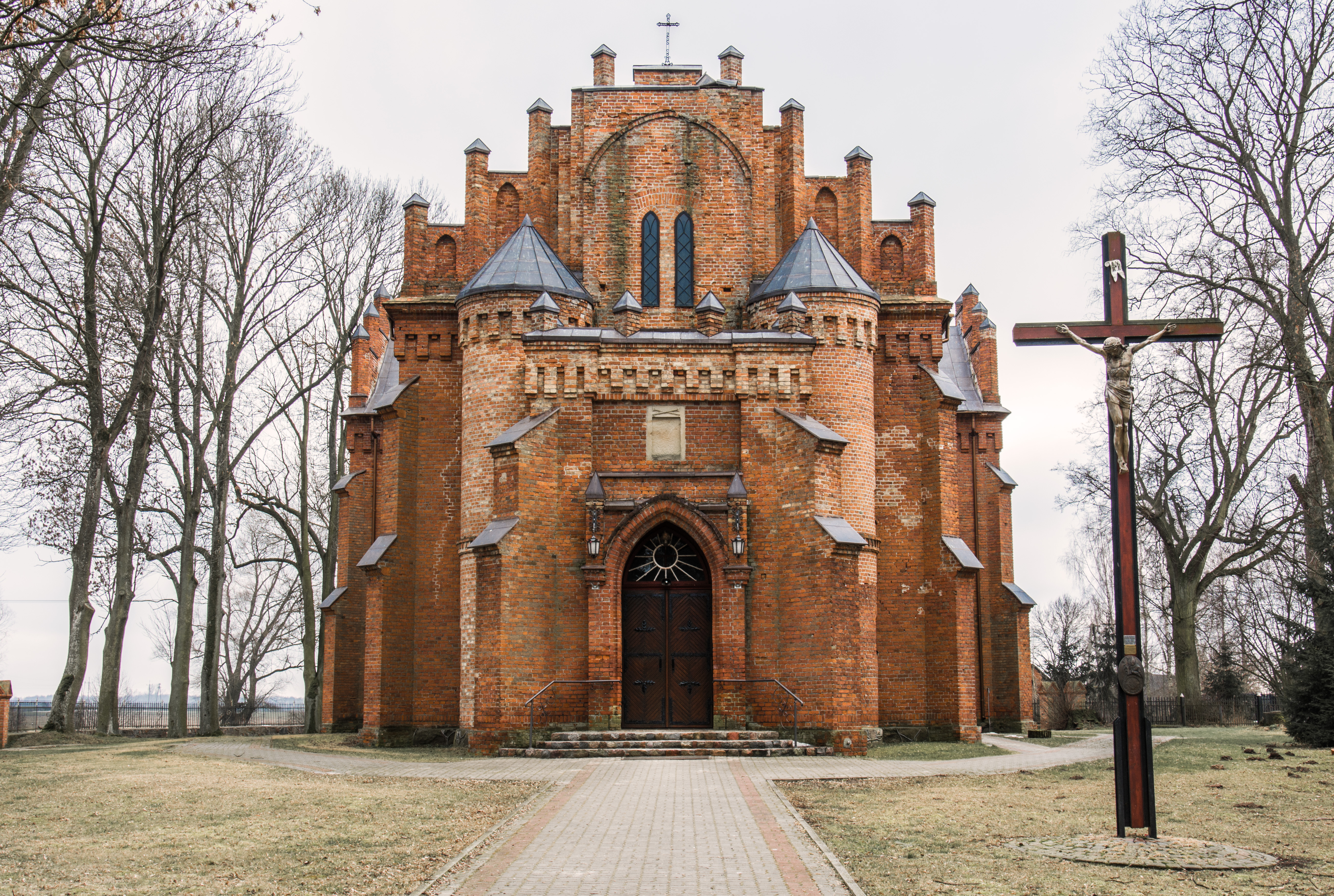
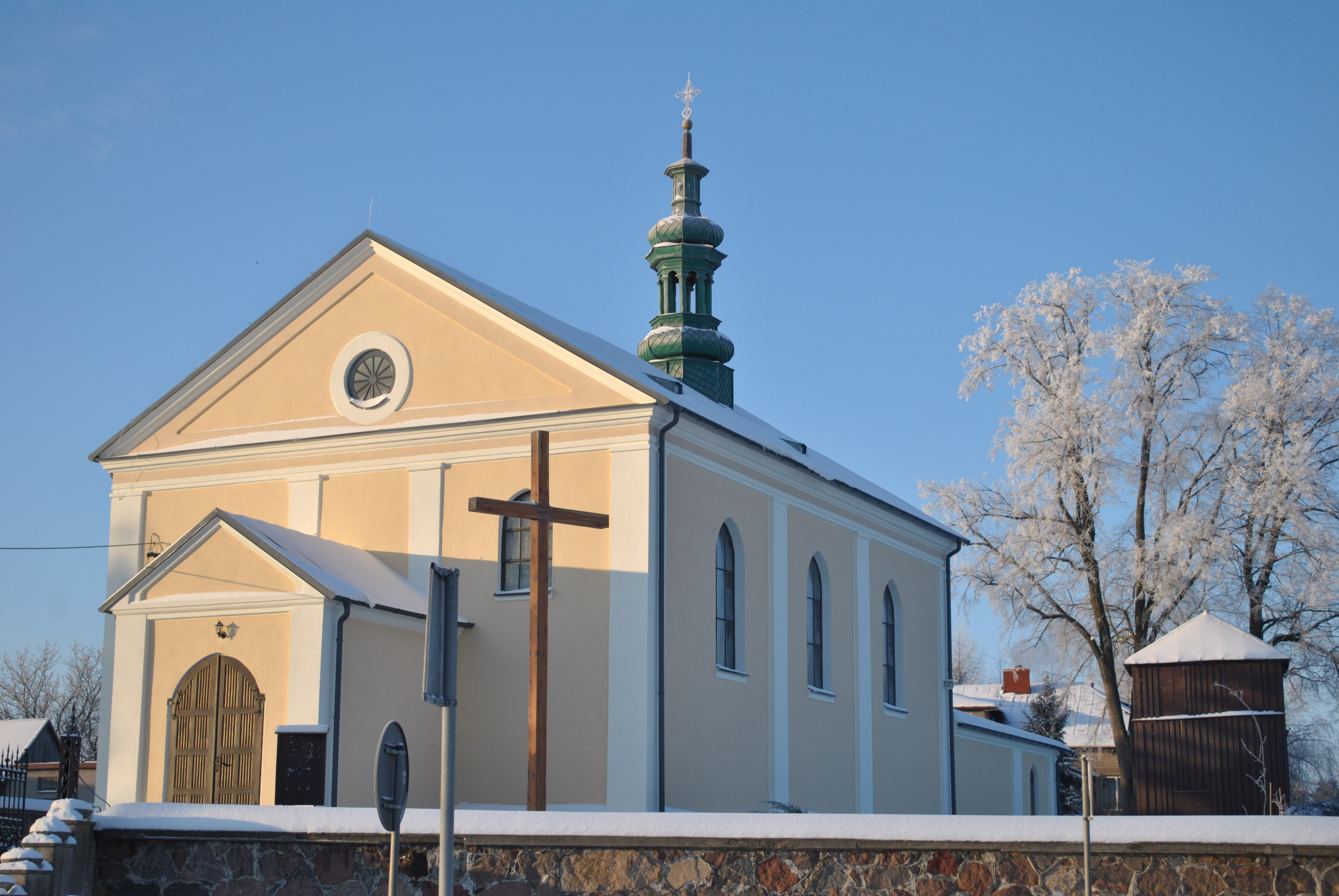
- Józef Piłsudski Park in Mława Saint Anne church in Strzegowo Saint Nicholas church in Niedzbórz Saint Mary Magdalene church in Szydłowo

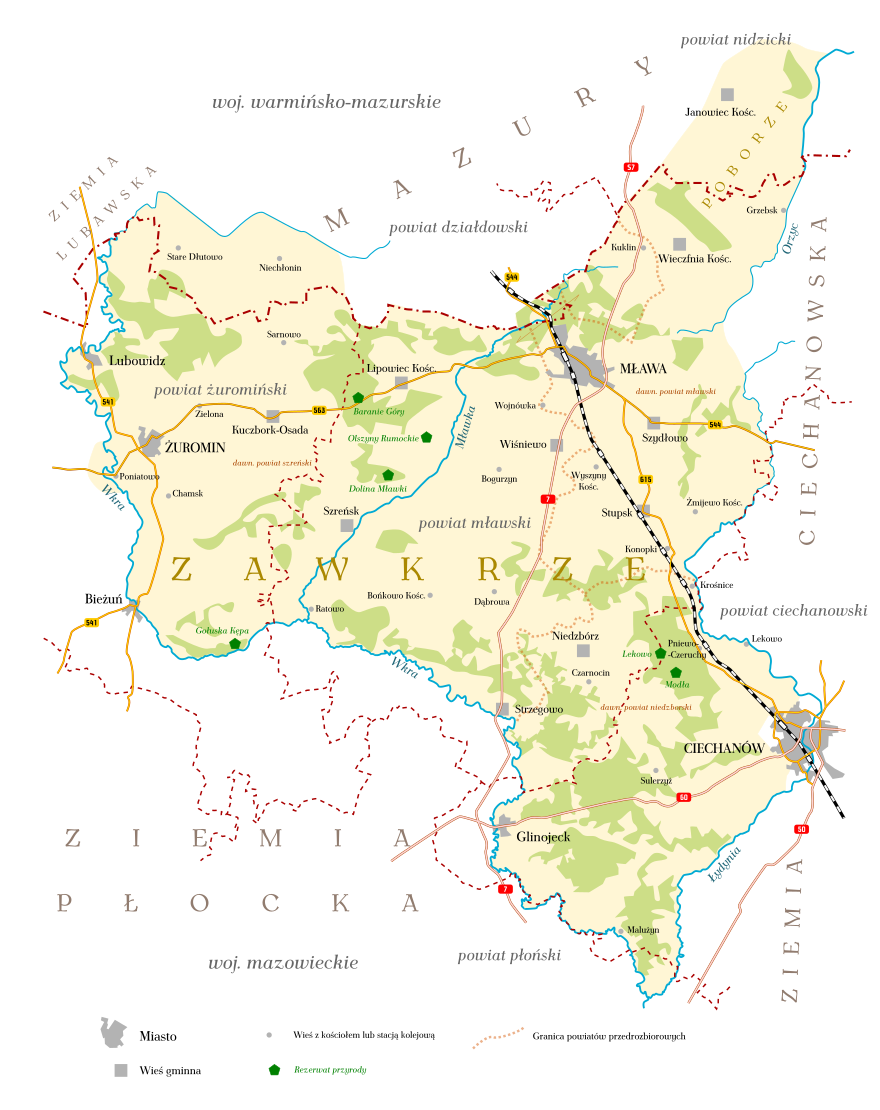
- Map of Zawkrze
- Country: Poland
- Historical region: Mazovia
- Historical capital: Szreńsk
- Largest town: Mława

Area
  - Total: 1,779 km^{2} (687 sq mi)
- Time zone: UTC+1 (CET)
  - Summer (DST): UTC+2 (CEST)

Zawkrze, also Zawkrze Land (Polish: ziemia zawkrzańska), is a small historic region of Poland (ziemia), located in northern Mazovia, along the border with Masuria. Its approximate area is 1,784 km^{2} (689 sq mi), and the population is about 114,000. Currently, Zawkrze has three towns, and more than 200 villages. Its name comes from the Wkra river – Zawkrze means the land behind the Wkra, from the perspective of Płock, the historic capital of Mazovia. The largest town of the region is Mława, while the historic capital of Zawkrze is Szreńsk.

Zawkrze lies between the Wkra (in the south), Działdówka (in the west), Orzyca and Łydynia (in the east) rivers, and the former border with Prussia in the north. From east to west, Zawkrze is some 55 km (34 mi), while from north to south – some 70 km (43 mi). Currently, Zawkrze is divided between five counties and two voivodeships - Mława, Żuromin, Ciechanów, Nidzica and Działdowo. It has four towns, Mława, Żuromin, Glinojeck, Lubowidz, as well as three former towns – Kuczbork-Osada, Niedzbórz and Szreńsk. There is a sports club "Zawkrze" Mława, as well as a Museum of the Zawkrze Region, also in Mława.

== History ==
Following the medieval fragmentation of Poland, Zawkrze was part of the duchies of Masovia and Płock. The northern border was established by the Treaty of Kalisz in 1343. From 1384 to 1399 and from 1407 to 1411, Zawkrze was pawned to the Teutonic Knights by Duke of Mazovia, Siemowit IV. In 1494, during the reign of King John I Albert, Zawkrze was reincorporated directly into the Kingdom of Poland, in which it was part of Płock Voivodeship within the Greater Poland Province. It was divided into three counties (Szreńsk, Mława and Niedzbórz), and its boundaries remained unchanged until the Partitions of Poland. Following the Second Partition of Poland (1793), the northern part of Zawkrze was annexed by the Kingdom of Prussia, and in 1795, the whole Zawkrze became part of Prussia. In 1807, Zawkrze became part of the short-lived Polish Duchy of Warsaw, and after its dissolution, from 1815 to 1918, it belonged to Russian-controlled Congress Poland.

Following the joint German-Soviet invasion of Poland, which started World War II in September 1939, the region was occupied by Germany until 1945, and the local population was subjected to persecution. The village of Ościsłowo was the site of large massacres, in which several hundreds of Poles were murdered as part of the Intelligenzaktion, and several dozen disabled from the region were murdered as part of Aktion T4.

== Sources ==
- History of Zawkrze
