= Gostynin =

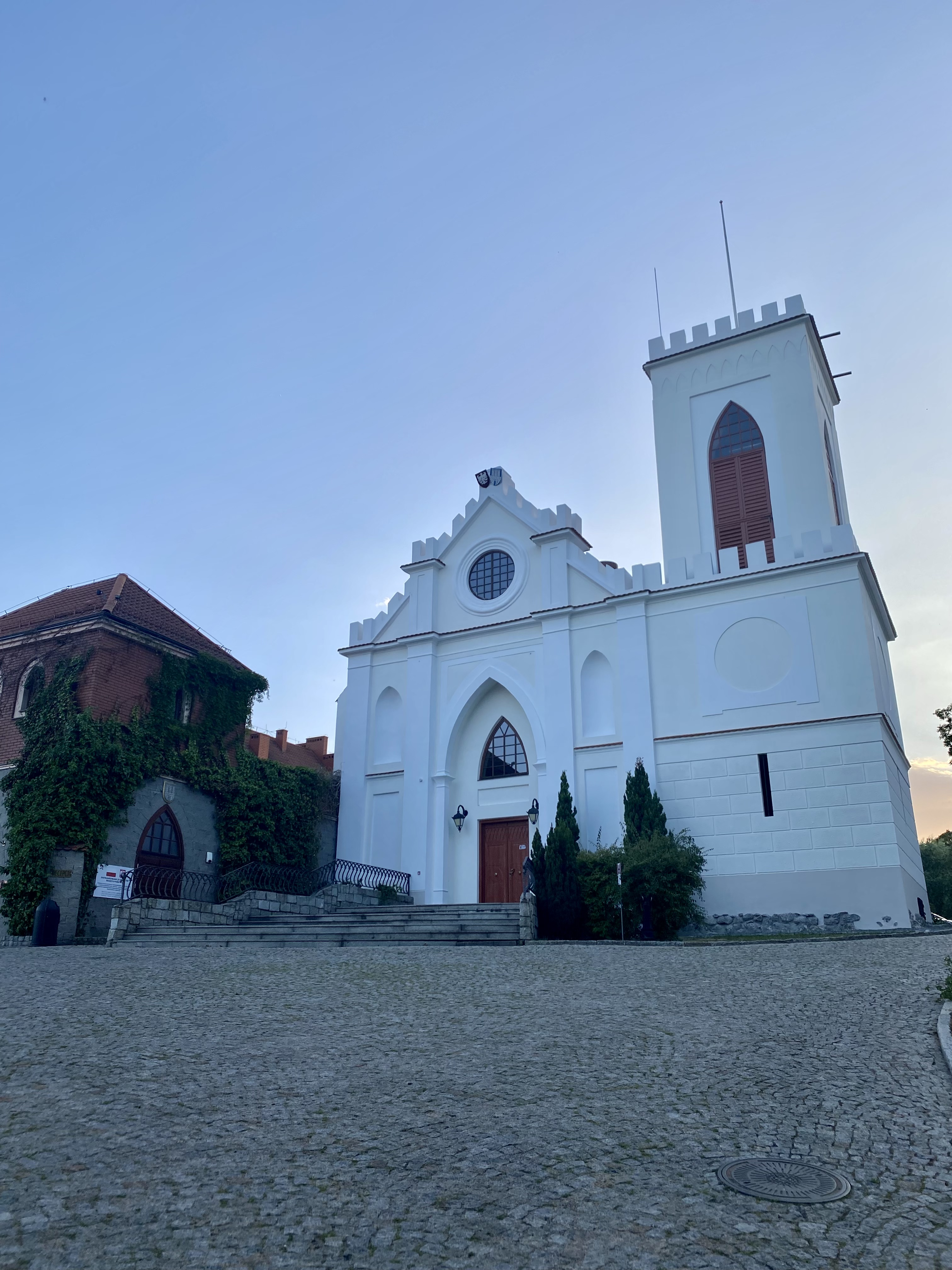
- Castle in Gostynin

- Flag Coat of arms

- Location within Poland
- Coordinates: 52°25′N 19°28′E
- Country: Poland
- Voivodeship: Masovian
- County: Gostynin
- Gmina: Gostynin (urban gmina)
- Established: 13th century
- Town rights: 1382

Government
  - Mayor: Agnieszka Korajczyk-Szyperska (PO)

Area
  - Total: 32.31 km^{2} (12.47 sq mi)

Population (2006)
  - Total: 19,119
  - Density: 591.7/km^{2} (1,533/sq mi)
- Time zone: UTC+1 (CET)
  - Summer (DST): UTC+2 (CEST)
- Postal code: 09-500
- Area code: +48 024
- Car plates: WGS
- Website: http://www.gostynin.pl/

Gostynin [ɡɔsˈtɨɲin] is a town in central Poland with 19,414 inhabitants (2004). It is the capital of Gostynin County in the Masovian Voivodeship.

== History ==
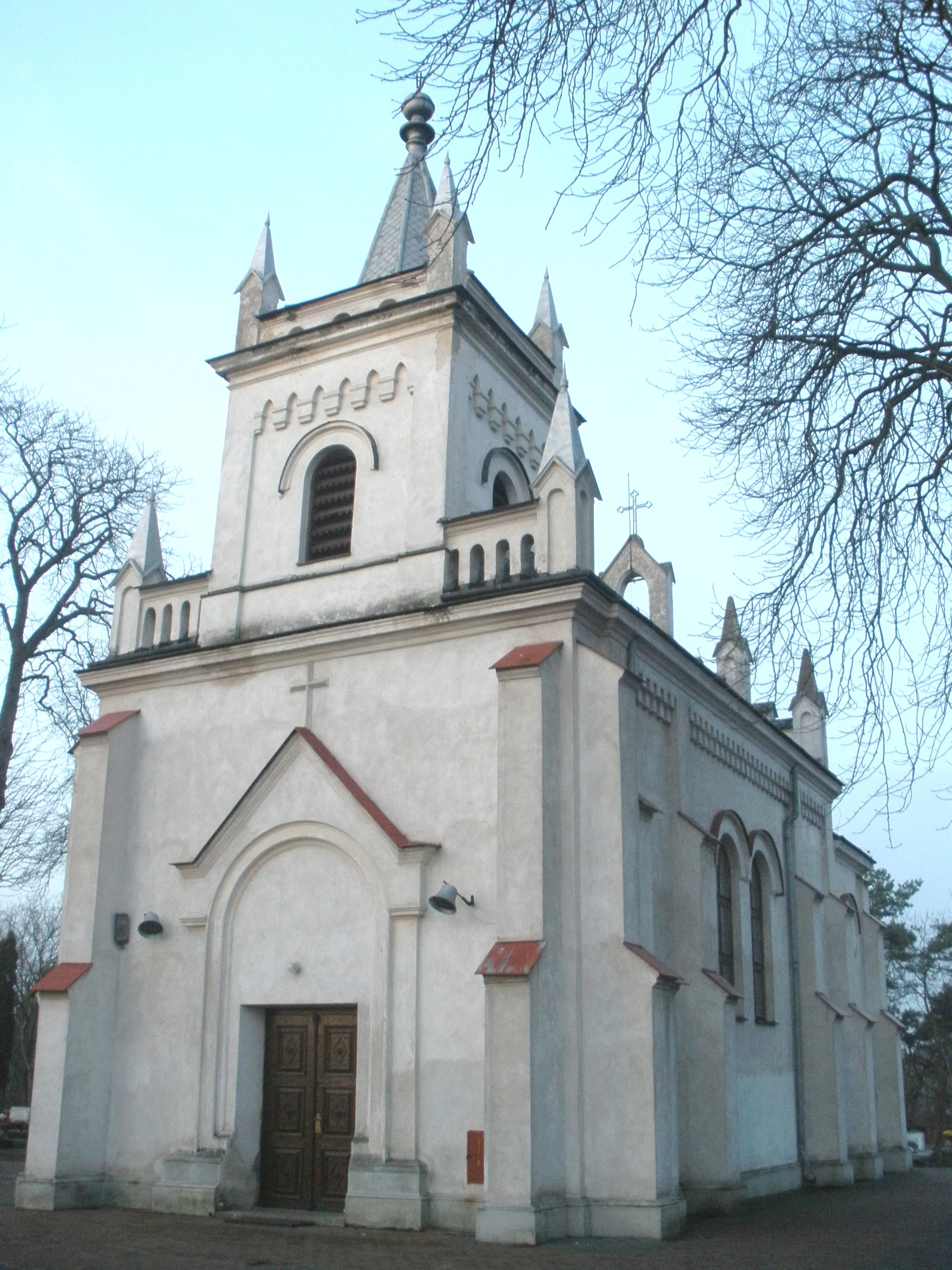
Saint James chapel

Gostynin has a long and rich history, which dates back to the early Middle Ages. In the 6th century, a Slavic gord existed north of contemporary town, on a hill located on the left bank of the Skrwa Lewa river, along a merchant trail. In the 12th century, the settlement found itself near the border between the provinces of Mazovia and Kuyavia.

In c. 1240, Gostynin was expanded by Duke Konrad I of Masovia, and in the 1280s, Duke Boleslaw II and Duke Konrad II fought over control of the settlement. As a result, in 1286 it was burned by Konrad II. Quickly rebuilt, in 1300 Gostynin was besieged but not captured by forces of Wenceslaus II of Bohemia. In c. 1326, the gord was besieged by Władysław I the Elbow-high, who wanted to control the area of Płock, which was a Bohemian fief.

By the early 14th century, Gostynin emerged as an important administrative center of Mazovia. In 1329, it became the seat of a castellan; first known castellan was a man named Pawel, mentioned in a 1345 document. In 1352, Siemowit III for the first time used the title “Duke of Gostynin”. It was probably during his reign that a defensive castle with a tower was built. At that time, a new settlement was established on the right bank of the Skrwa Lewa river, with a market square and a new parish church of St. Martin. In 1382, Duke Siemowit IV granted town charter to Gostynin, and as a result, ancient gord, located on the left bank of the river declined. Siemowit IV expanded the castle, making it his favorite residence. Władysław II Jagiełło visited Gostynin twice (1414, 1419). Siemowit IV died here in 1426, and after his death, the complex was rebuilt, with a wooden chapel added to it in 1439.

After childless deaths of two last dukes of Płock (Siemowit VI) and Władysław II of Płock, in 1462 Gostynin’s residents welcomed King Casimir IV Jagiellon, who confirmed all town’s privileges, and attached it to the Kingdom of Poland. From 1462 until 1793, Gostynin was part of Rawa Voivodeship, in which it was the seat of both a Land, and a county. Gostynin continued to prosper - in the period known as the Polish Golden Age, it had 265 houses, inn, mills and a brewery (as for 1564). In 1612, Russian Tsar Vasili IV died at the Gostynin castle, in which he had been kept with two brothers since 1611.

The period prosperity ended during the Swedish invasion of Poland (1655–1660), after which only 20 houses were left in the whole town. Gostynin never recovered: it was burned by Russians in 1772, during Bar Confederation, and in 1777, the number of houses was only 43. By 1797, Gostynin had 89 houses, three churches, inn, brewery, three mills, sawmill and a wooden town hall

In 1793, following the second partition of Poland, Gostynin was captured by Prussian army. The castle, which had for long time been neglected, was pulled down, and its archive was seized by the occupiers. In 1807–1815, Gostynin belonged to the Duchy of Warsaw; in 1809, most of the town burned in a great fire. In 1824, the government of Russian-controlled Congress Poland invited to Gostynin 124 German cloth makers, who came with their families. The town began the process of recovery: St. Martin church, town hall and inn were rebuilt, and ruins of the castle were turned into a Protestant church. On January 28, 1863, the sixth day of the January Uprising, a Polish insurgent unit liberated a transport of Poles forcibly conscripted into the Russian army. During the uprising, a rebel unit of Emeryk Syrewicz operated in the area of Gostynin. In 1918, Poland regained independence and control of the town. The town had a significant Jewish minority, which in the Second Polish Republic numbered some 2,000, out of total population of 12,000. In 1924-25, Gostynin received rail connection with Płock and Kutno, thanks to a newly built line.

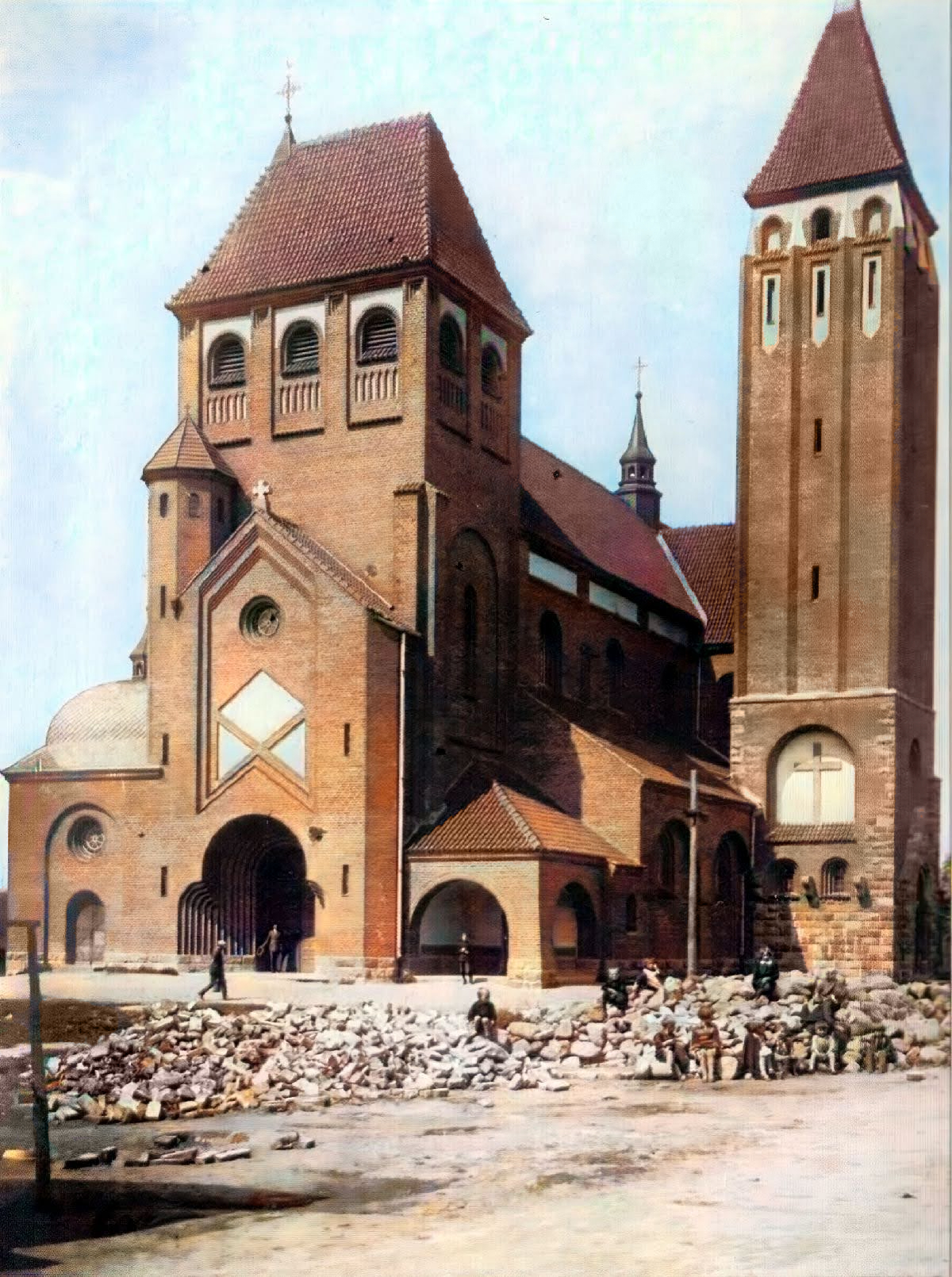
Neo-romanesque church in Gostynin designed by architect Jarosław Wojciechowski, destroyed by Germans in 1941-1942

During the German invasion of Poland, which started World War II, the Wehrmacht captured the town on 16 September 1939, and by late September, the town was directly annexed to the Third Reich. Its name was first changed into Gasten, and from June 1941 until the end of German occupation it was called Walrode. In October–November 1939, the Germans carried out mass arrests of local prominent Poles, as part of the Intelligenzaktion and then massacred 22 prisoners in the nearby forest of Wola Łącka on 1 December 1939. Among the victims were local mayor Michał Jarmoliński, member of Polish parliament Andrzej Czapski, chiefs of the local police and fire department, local teachers and priests. In February 1940, the Germans carried out a massacre of 40 Poles in the nearby forest. From 1940 to 1944 the local Polish population was subjected to expulsions. German authorities opened here a Jewish ghetto, most of whose residents were murdered in the Chełmno extermination camp. Germans retreated from Gostynin on 18 January 1945. As a result of the war 15% of the town was destroyed.

In 1946, a transit camp for Polish orphans repatriated from the Soviet Union was established in the town.

From 1975 to 1998, it was administratively located in the Płock Voivodeship.

== Transport ==
National road 60 bypasses Gostynin to the east. National road 60 connects Gostynin to Płock and to Kutno.

Voivodeship road 573 passes right through the town connecting it to Żychlin to the south and to Nowy Duninów to the north-west.

Gostynin has a station on the Kutno-Sierpc railway line.

== Cuisine ==
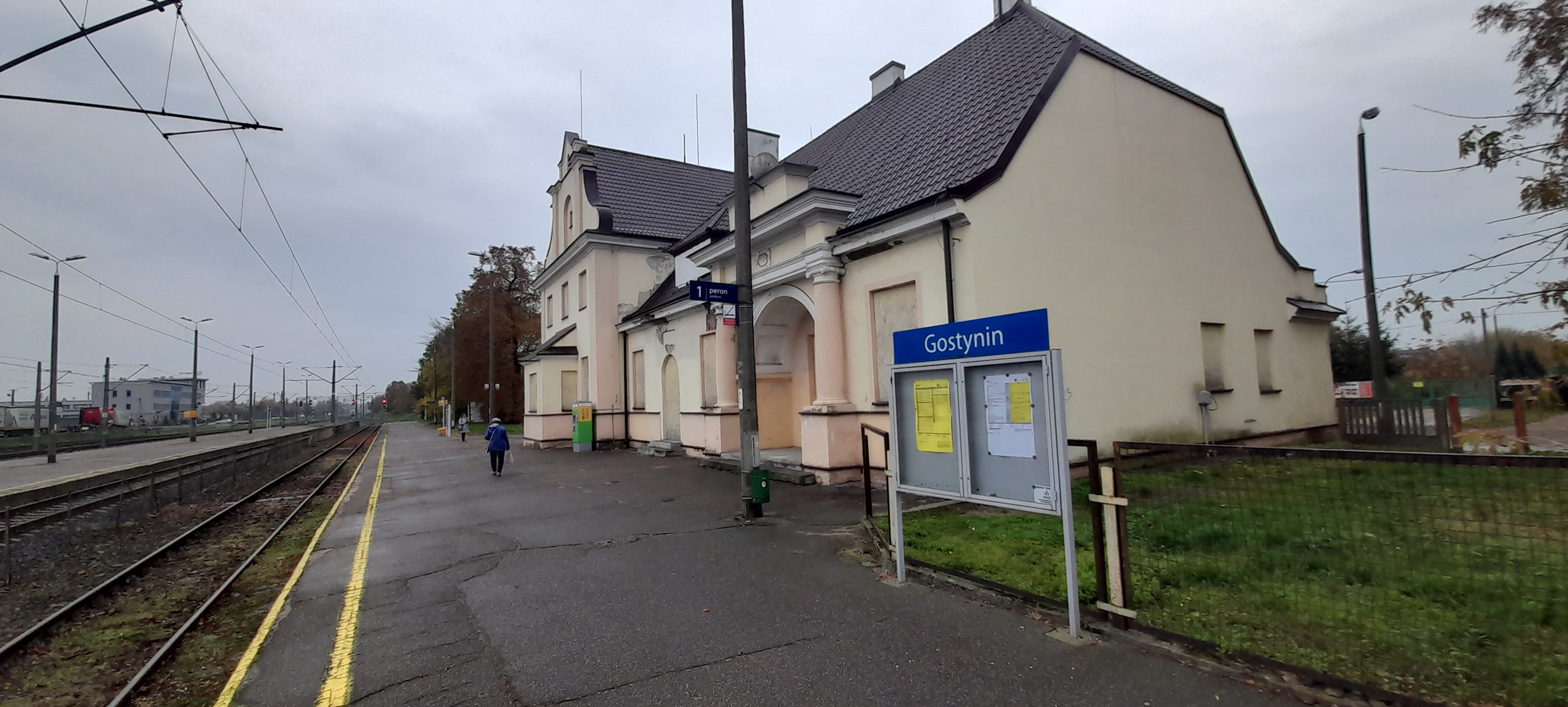
Rail station in Gostynin

The officially protected distinctive traditional dish of the town and its surroundings is Gostynin fried mushrooms (grzyby smażone gostynińskie), as designated by the Ministry of Agriculture and Rural Development of Poland.
