= Skarbiec wawelski =

Series of pastel paintings by Leon Wyczółkowski

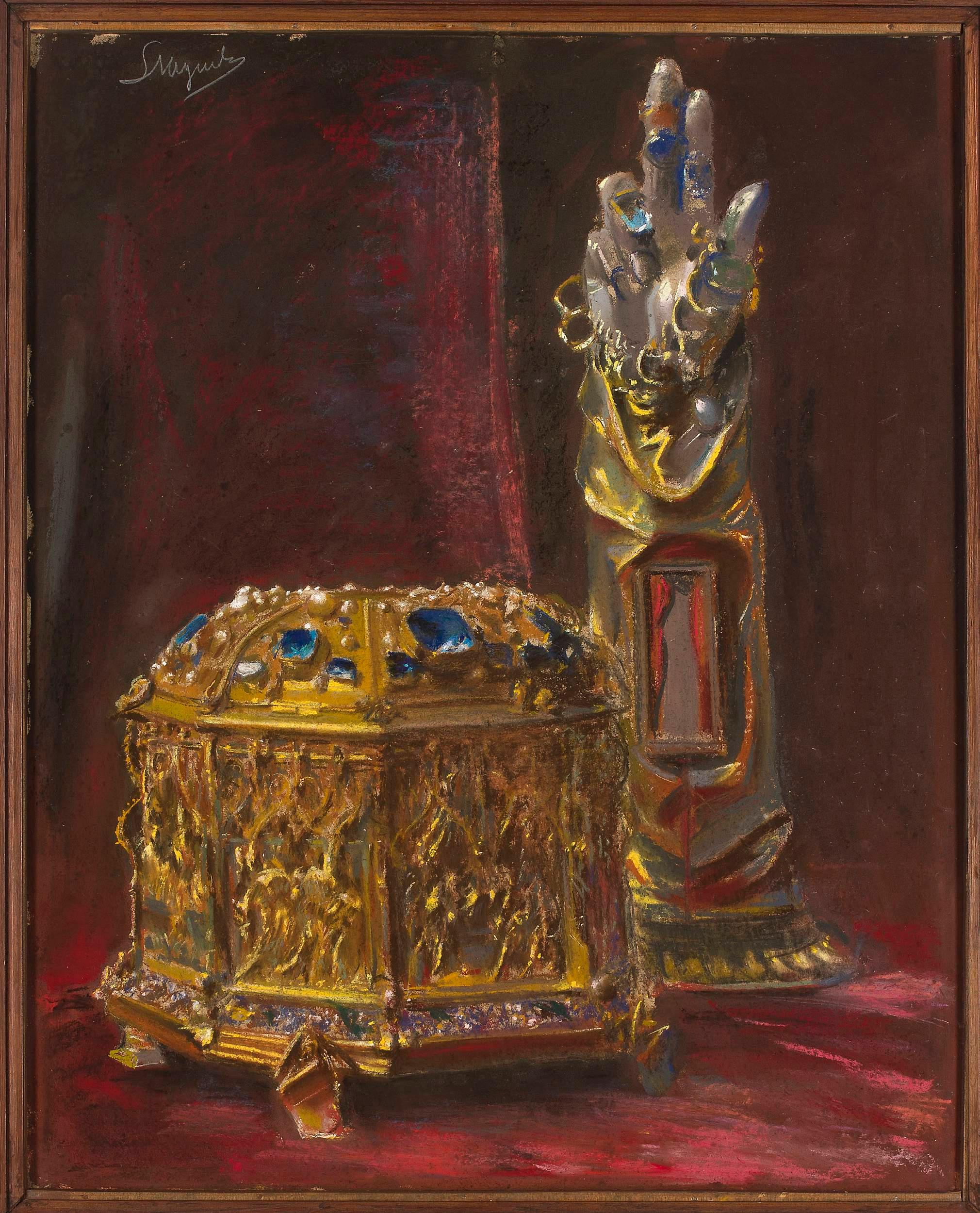
- Artist: Leon Wyczółkowski
- Year: 1907
- Medium: Pastel on paper on cardboard, pastel on cardboard, pastel on paper, pastel on paper on canvas
- Location: National Museum in Warsaw

Skarbiec wawelski (English: Wawel Treasury) is a series of paintings by Leon Wyczółkowski, created in 1907 using pastel techniques on various supports, including paper on cardboard, cardboard, paper, and paper on canvas. The series depicts historical artifacts from the Wawel Cathedral Treasury in Kraków, Poland. Exhibited in Kraków and Warsaw in 1907, it is the only complete set of pastel works by Wyczółkowski that has been preserved. Created in the context of the restoration of Wawel Castle led by Zygmunt Hendel, the series documents items from the treasury, such as reliquaries and objects associated with Polish kings and bishops. The series received attention from both the public and critics at the time.

== Origins ==
=== Restoring Wawel's historical role ===
At the turn of the 20th century, Poland was under foreign partitions, and Poles sought to restore the significance of sites tied to their national identity, including Wawel Castle. For over a century, Austrian troops were stationed at Wawel, but efforts prevented the Wawel Cathedral from becoming a garrison church. In the 1880s, restoration of the cathedral began, alongside initiatives to reclaim secular parts of the hill. Although the castle was intended as an imperial residence, its return to Polish control progressed from 1904 to 1911.

=== Polish artists' projects related to Wawel ===
In the Polish art world of the time, the reclamation of Wawel as a national symbol inspired numerous projects. Some, like Stanisław Wyspiański and Władysław Ekielski's Acropolis (1904–1907) or Wacław Szymanowski's Procession to Wawel (1907–1911), aimed to establish Wawel as a national pantheon. Wyczółkowski's pastel cycle aligns with these artistic trends.

=== Kraków and Wawel in Wyczółkowski's work ===
In the 1890s, Wyczółkowski created a series of oil paintings titled Sarcophagi, frequently depicting the Wawel Cathedral and its treasures, later including the castle's Renaissance arcades. The 1907 decision to restore the treasury's artifacts likely influenced the timing of the cycle. In 1900, Wyczółkowski visited an exhibition of Jagiellonian-era relics for the 500th anniversary of the Jagiellonian University, which may have further inspired this project.

=== Influences from earlier artistic inventories ===
The concept of an "artistic inventory" was familiar in Polish art. For example, Patterns of Medieval Art and the Renaissance to the End of the 17th Century in Former Poland was chromolithographed in Warsaw from 1853 to 1869. Wawel Treasury artifacts had been documented earlier, notably in 1882 by Father Ignacy Polkowski in National Mementos, with 32 illustrations based on Ludwik Łepkowski's drawings. 21 of these artifacts appear in Wyczółkowski's cycle. Unlike earlier inventories, Wyczółkowski's pastels emphasize artistic effect, sometimes exaggerating proportions or enhancing the objects' aesthetic qualities.

== Depicted artifacts ==
The cycle comprises 17 pastels portraying 30 artifacts from the cathedral treasury, plus the sarcophagus of Saint Stanislaus. Some sources also include the painting Pallium in the cycle.

=== Infuła biskupa Strzempińskiego i pastorał biskupa Gembickiego ===
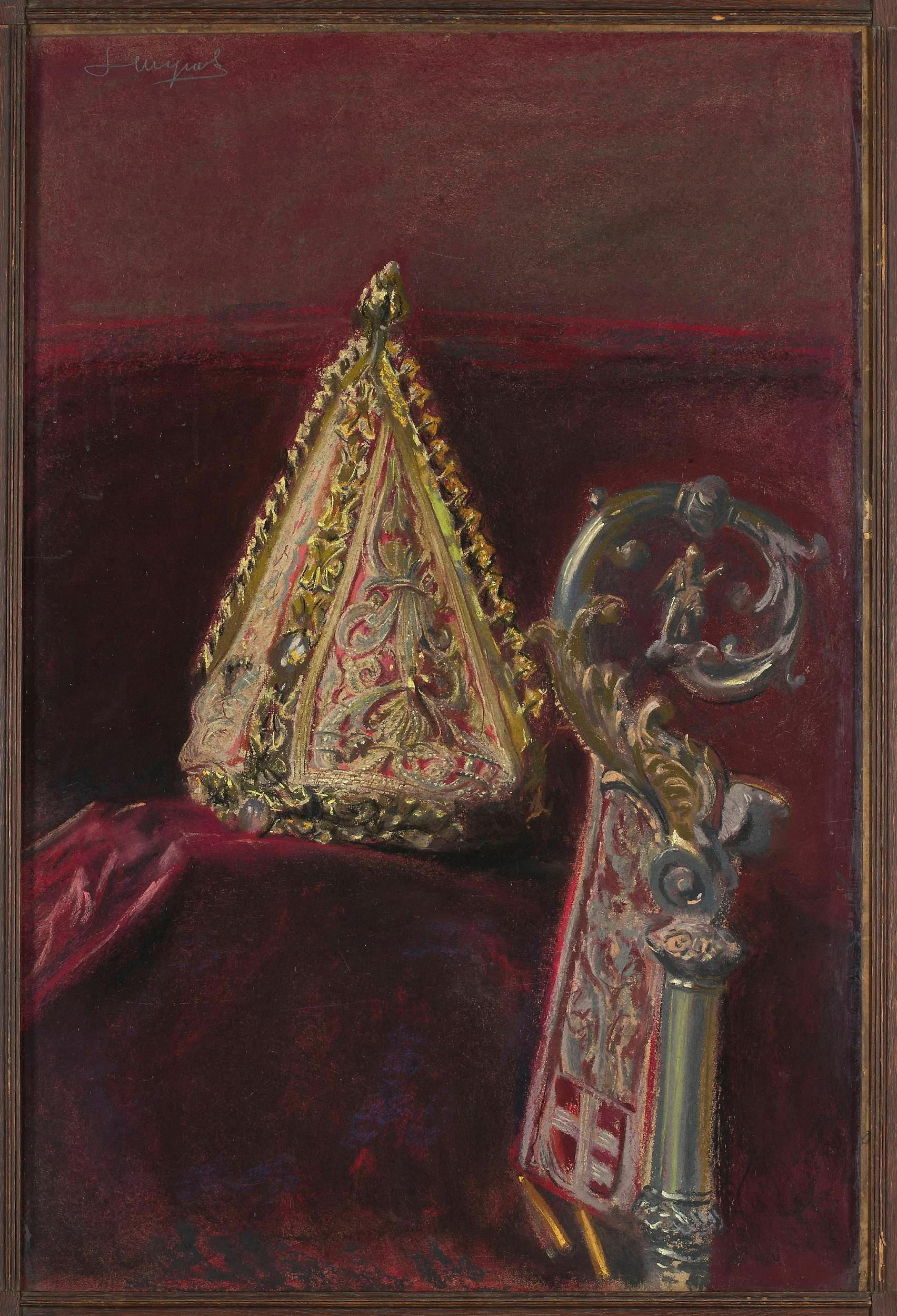
Infuła biskupa Strzempińskiego i pastorał biskupa Gembickiego

The pastel Infuła biskupa Strzempińskiego i pastorał biskupa Gembickiego (Mitre of Bishop Strzempiński and Crosier of Bishop Gembicki) depicts two objects. The first is the mitre of Tomasz Strzępiński, Bishop of Kraków from 1456 to 1460, created for his assumption of authority. Originally embroidered with pearls, it featured gilded frames with clasps and a floral finial. In the 16th century, additional embroidery and ribbons were added. The second object is the silver crozier of Piotr Gembicki, Bishop of Kraków from 1642 to 1657, featuring a figure of Saint Peter. Bequeathed to the cathedral per Gembicki's will, it is rendered in pastel on cardboard.

- Dimensions: 88 cm × 60 cm
- Signature: "LWyczół" in pencil, top left.

=== Kapa koronacyjna króla Michała Korybuta ===
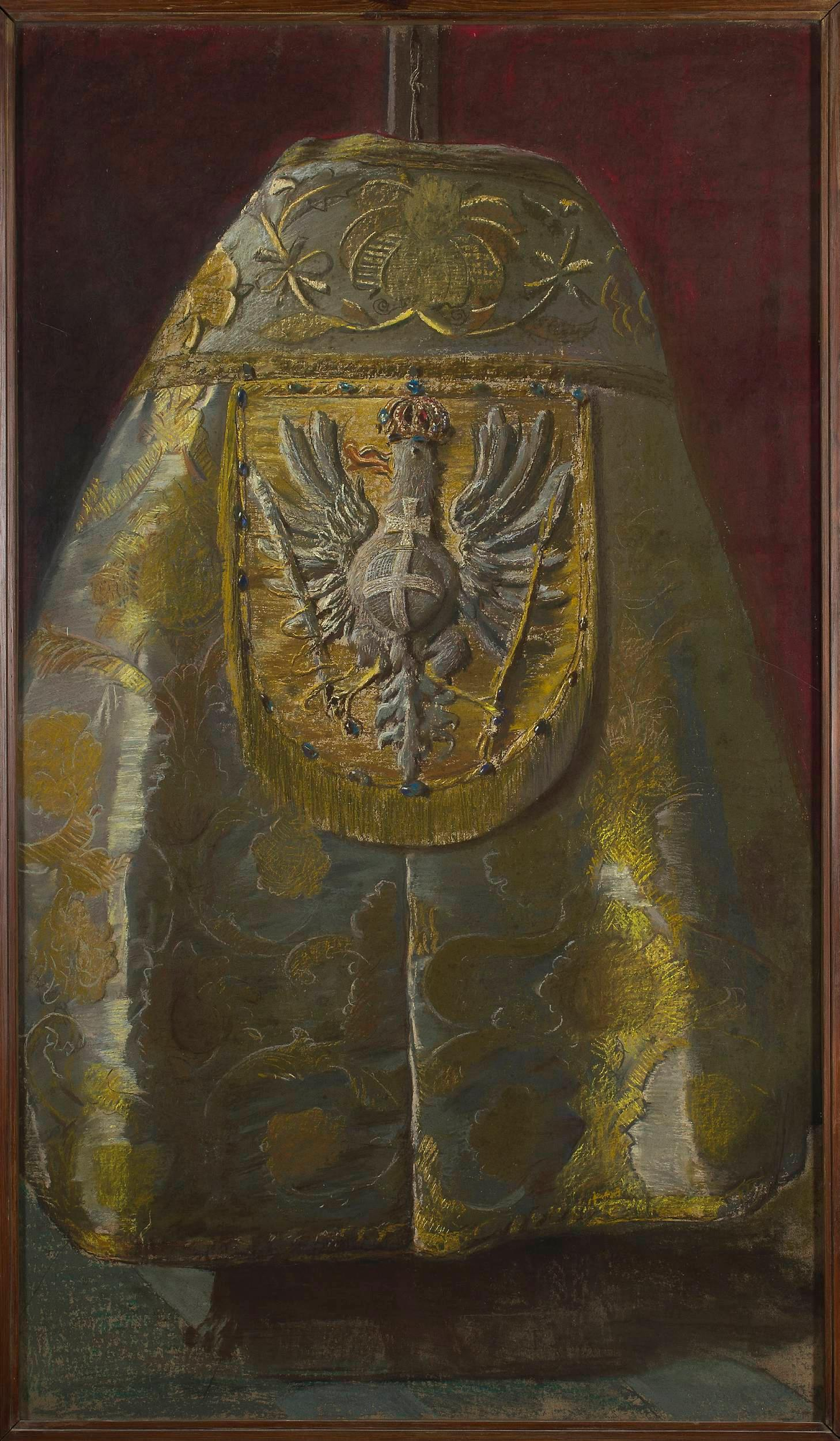
Kapa koronacyjna króla Michała Korybuta

The painting Kapa koronacyjna króla Michała Korybuta (Coronation Cope of King Michał Korybut) portrays the oldest surviving coronation cope, crafted in 1670. Known as the cope of Andrzej Trzebicki or Michał Korybut Wiśniowiecki, it incorporates Trzebicki's cope, made for the coronation of Queen Eleonore of Austria, and elements from Michał Korybut's coronation mantle, including its hood and belt. A clasp from a cope donated by Bishop Krzysztof Jan Szembek before 1740 is also included. Donated by Trzebicki, it was used only for major ceremonies. Wyczółkowski displayed it on a mannequin to highlight its features, emphasizing the hood with the White Eagle, which bears all royal insignia: a crown, sceptre, sword, and orb. The silver and gold hues dominate, with soft lighting accentuating the folds.

- Medium: Pastel on paper on cardboard
- Dimensions: 168 cm × 98 cm
- Inscription: In ink on verso, "Coronation Cope of Michał Korybut".

=== Kielich biskupa Maciejowskiego, tzw. skrzyneczka królowej Jadwigi i pucharek "roboty króla Zygmunta III" ===
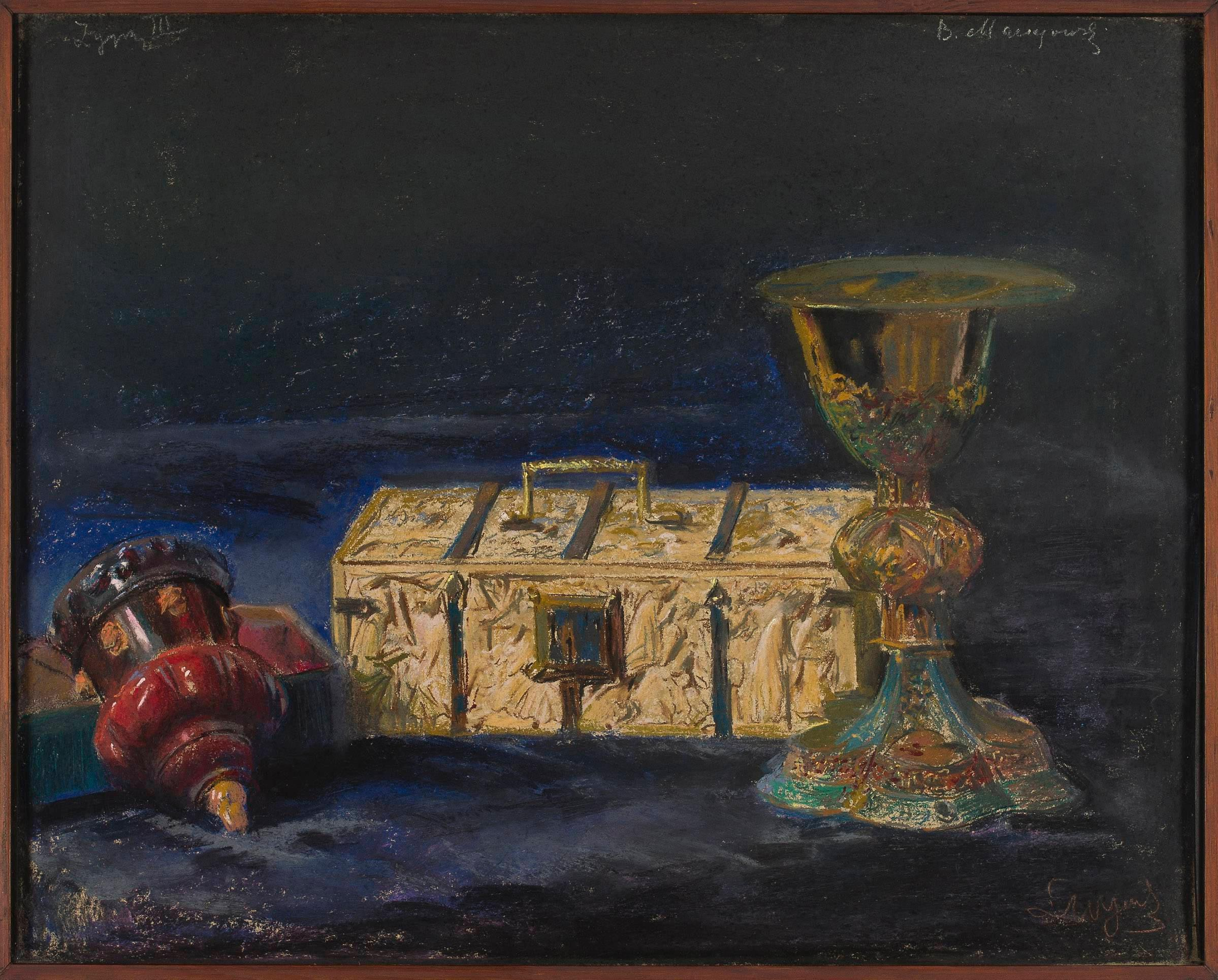
Kielich biskupa Maciejowskiego, tzw. skrzyneczka królowej Jadwigi i pucharek "roboty króla Zygmunta III"

The pastel Kielich biskupa Maciejowskiego, tzw. skrzyneczka królowej Jadwigi i pucharek "roboty króla Zygmunta III" (Chalice of Bishop Maciejowski, So-Called Queen Jadwiga's Casket, and Goblet Attributed to King Sigismund III) features a chalice, an amber goblet, and an ivory casket, which also appears in the painting Racjonał i szkatułka królowej Jadwigi (Rationale and Queen Jadwiga's Casket). The chalice was mistakenly attributed – including by Wyczółkowski himself – to Bishop Bernard Maciejowski, who was a promoter of the cult of Queen Jadwiga. The chalice is believed to have been made in 1539 by the goldsmith Erasmus Schleupner, who worked in Wrocław, and in 1545 was donated by Bishop Samuel Maciejowski to the cathedral treasury. It is gilded and enamelled. On the left side of the composition, Wyczółkowski placed an amber goblet from the early 17th century. 19th-century collectors associated this goblet with Sigismund III Vasa, who engaged in goldsmithing and painting – the object was attributed to him. In the center of the painting, Wyczółkowski depicted Queen Jadwiga's casket, which he also portrayed in another painting from this cycle – Racjonał i szkatułka królowej Jadwigi.

- Medium: Pastel on paper on cardboard
- Dimensions: 51.5 cm × 64 cm
- Signature: "LWyczół" at bottom right
- Inscriptions: "Zygm III" (left), "B. Maciejowski" (right) at top.

=== Kielich biskupa Padniewskiego ===
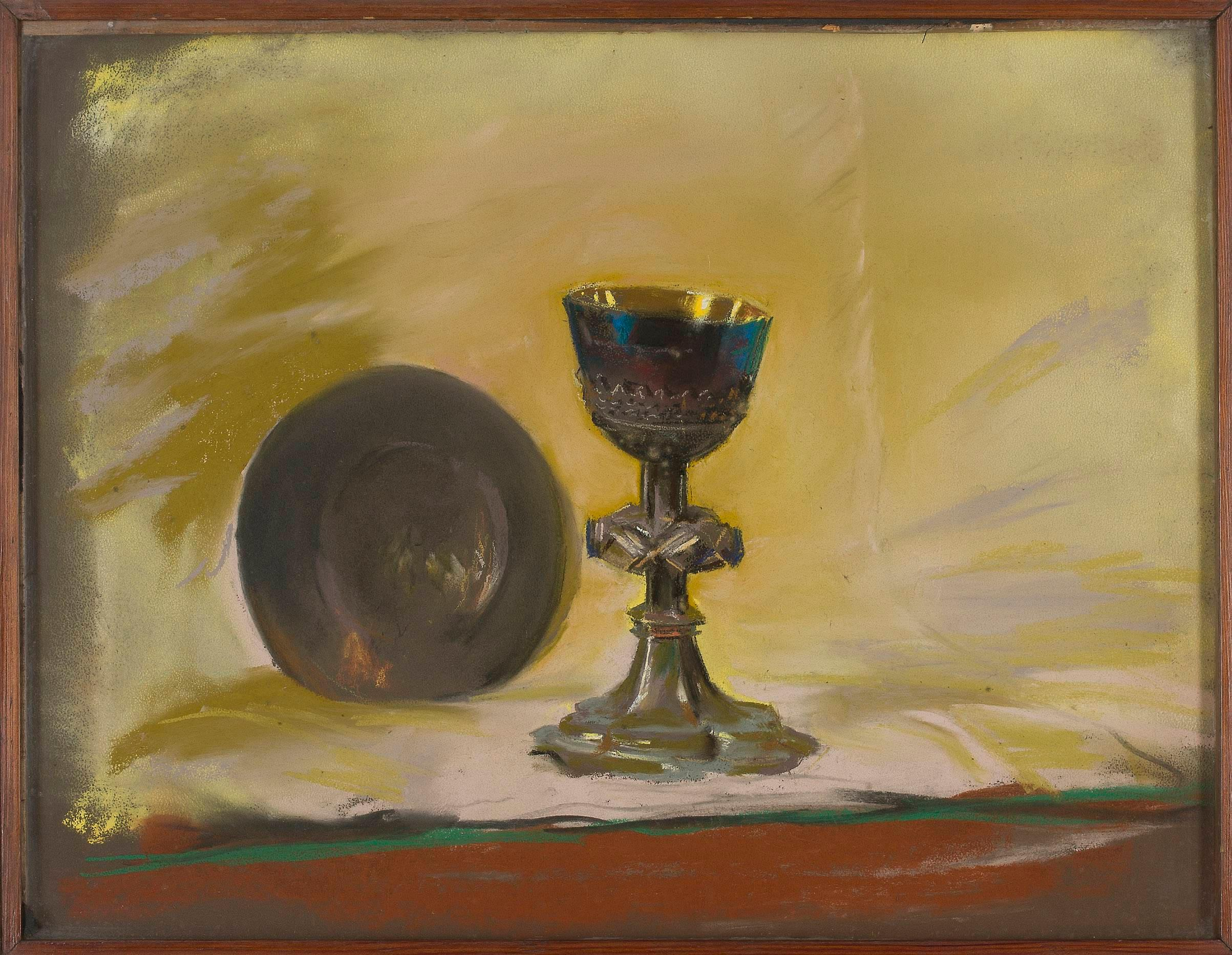
Kielich biskupa Padniewskiego

The work Kielich biskupa Padniewskiego (Chalice of Bishop Padniewski) depicts the chalice of Filip Padniewski, Bishop of Kraków from 1562 to 1572. Buried with the chalice as a symbol of priestly dignity, it was excavated in 1881 and added to the treasury. Wyczółkowski paired it with an unidentified paten, set against a white-green draped fabric.

- Medium: Pastel on paper on cardboard
- Dimensions: 42.5 cm × 55.5 cm.

=== Kielich "roboty króla Zygmunta III" ===
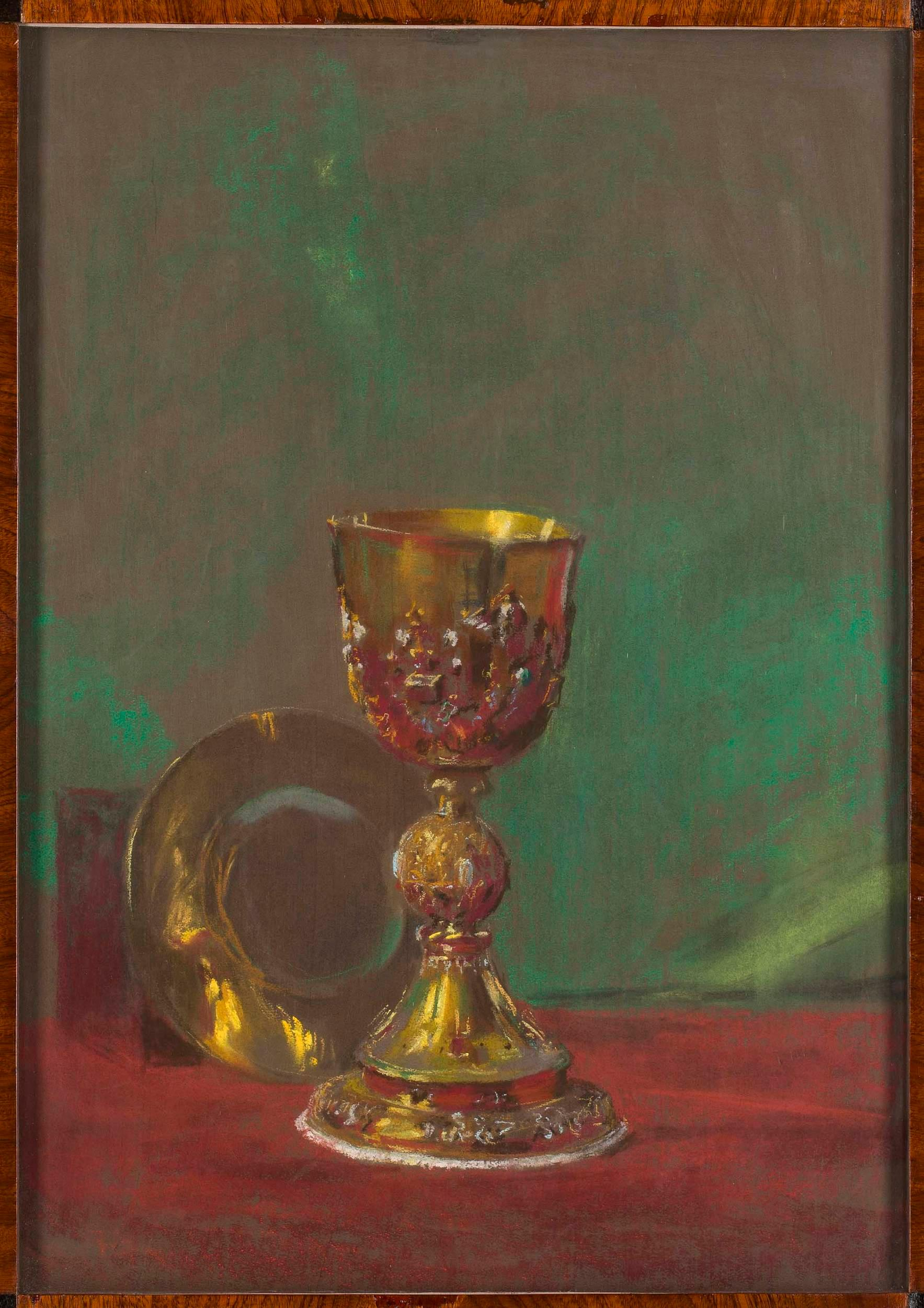
Kielich "roboty króla Zygmunta III"

The painting Kielich "roboty króla Zygmunta III" (Chalice Attributed to King Sigismund III) depicts a chalice, attributed to Sigismund III's goldsmithing, which was donated to the cathedral on 28 May 1609, per Father Ignacy Polkowski. Wyczółkowski arranged it with a paten on scarlet fabric, contrasting with a green background.

- Medium: Pastel on paper on cardboard
- Dimensions: 57 cm × 40 cm.

=== Krzyż z diademów książęcych, skrzyneczka zwana saraceńsko-sycylijską i tzw. szklanica św. Jadwigi Śląskiej ===
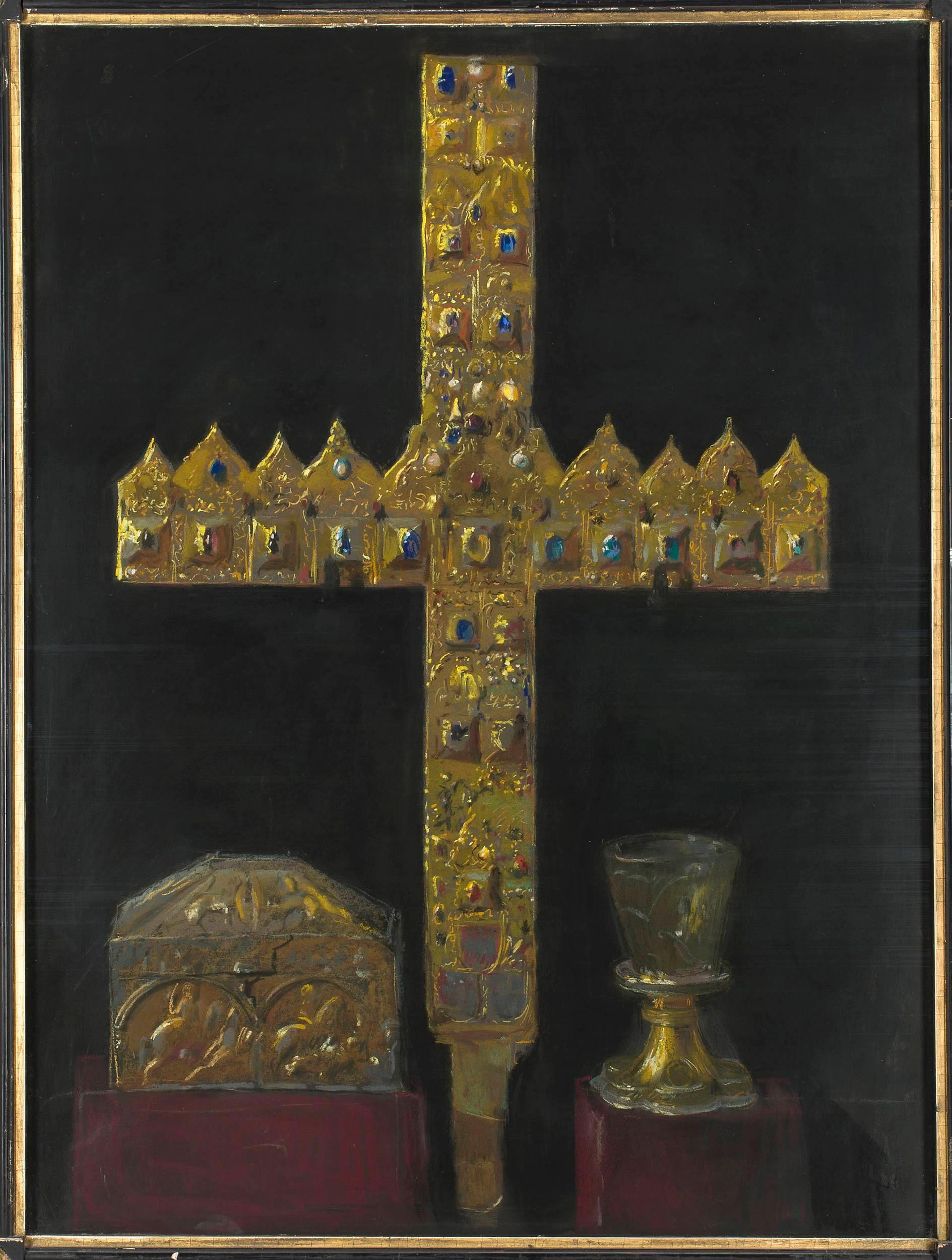
Krzyż z diademów książęcych, skrzyneczka zwana saraceńsko-sycylijską i tzw. szklanica św. Jadwigi Śląskiej

The pastel Krzyż z diademów książęcych, skrzyneczka zwana saraceńsko-sycylijską i tzw. szklanica św. Jadwigi Śląskiej (Cross of Princely Diadems, So-Called Saraceno-Sicilian Casket, and Glass of Saint Hedwig of Silesia) shows a cross made from 13th-century princely diadems adorned with gemstones, bearing the arms of King Casimir IV Jagiellon, Bishop Jan Rzeszowski, and the Kraków Chapter. To its left is the Saraceno-Sicilian casket, a silver-gilt 12th-century piece from the Middle East or Sicily, decorated with combat scenes and mythical creatures. To the right is the 12th-century glass of Saint Hedwig of Silesia, possibly Byzantine, with engraved decorations and a 15th-century six-lobed base.

- Medium: Pastel on paper on cardboard
- Dimensions: 106 cm × 79 cm.

=== Miecz koronacyjny Augusta III, włócznia św. Maurycego i miecz Zygmunta Augusta ===
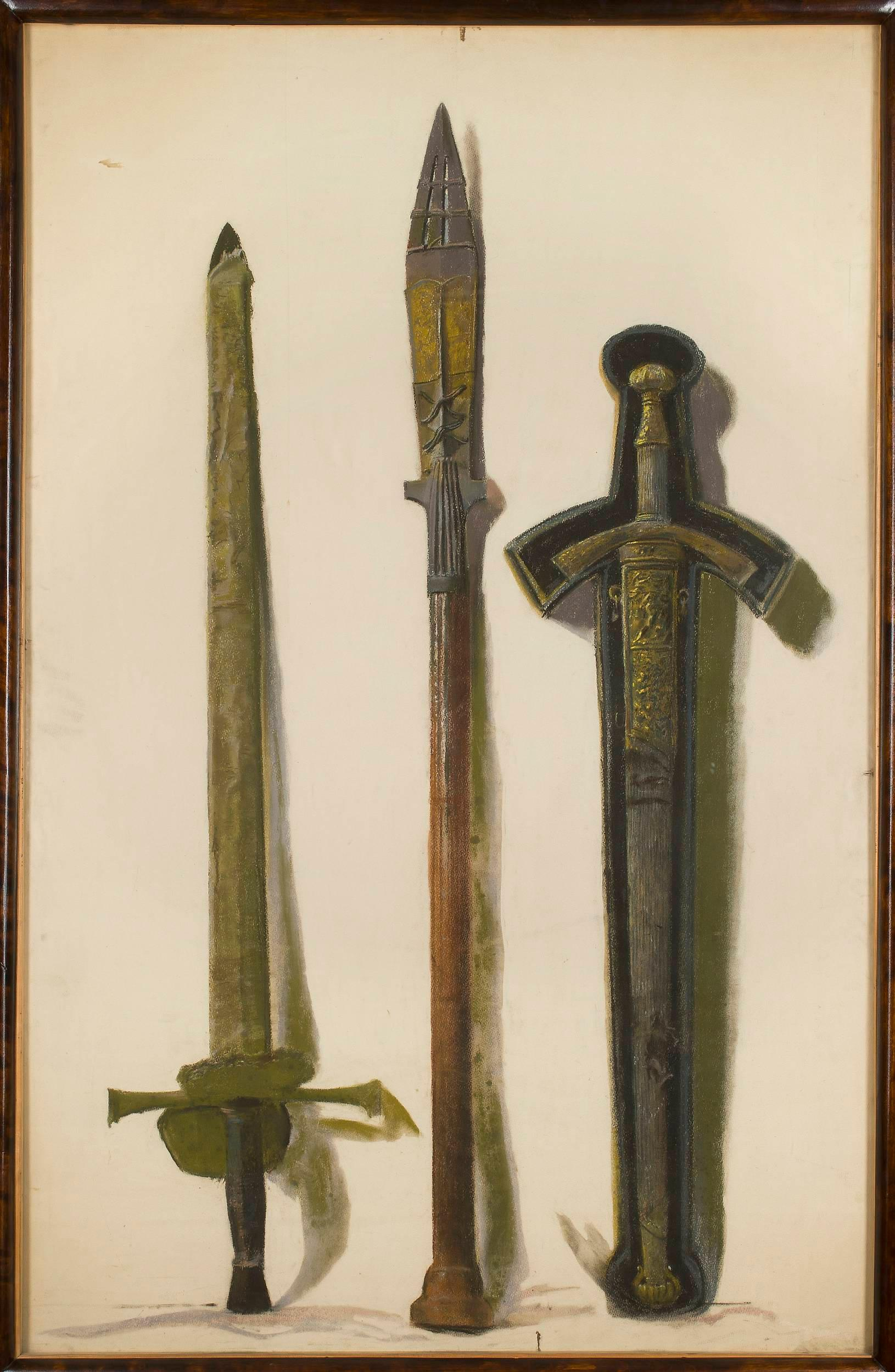
Miecz koronacyjny Augusta III, włócznia św. Maurycego i miecz Zygmunta Augusta

In the painting Miecz koronacyjny Augusta III, włócznia św. Maurycego i miecz Zygmunta Augusta (Coronation Sword of Augustus III, Spear of Saint Maurice, and Sword of Sigismund Augustus), Leon Wyczółkowski refrained from any arrangement of the insignia, considering national relics. Only the objects themselves are visible against a bright, neutral background in daylight, along with their shadows. This directs the viewer's attention solely to the objects, rather than to the background or other compositional details. It also emphasizes the symbolism of these items. Nevertheless, the painter did not use artistic expression or add radiance to the insignia, instead striving to depict them with utmost accuracy.

The Spear of Saint Maurice (the Spear with a Nail from the True Cross) was considered an insignia of sacred power. It symbolized the authority of Roman kings and emperors. Its copy, made in Germany or Italy, is shown at the center of the composition and was presented to Bolesław I the Brave as a token of recognition of his sovereignty by Otto III during the Congress of Gniezno in the year 1000. From that point on, it was regarded by Polish rulers as a sign of a sacred deposit of power. This spear was painted numerous times by Jan Matejko.

The coronation sword, depicted on the left side of the composition, was forged in Poland or Saxony around 1730. In 1734, it was used to crown Augustus III of Poland, as the Szczerbiec had been hidden by supporters of Stanisław Leszczyński. It was portrayed by Jan Matejko in the painting Union of Lublin (1869); the union was concluded in 1569, which illustrates the mistaken interpretations of the complex history of the coronation sword.

The sword depicted on the right side of the composition belonged to Sigismund II Augustus and was broken after his death. It serves as a symbol of the end of the Jagiellonian era in Polish history. It was made of silver, cast in Nuremberg in 1540 by Melchior Baier the Elder. In 1831, it was taken from the king's tomb and, seven years later, placed in a scabbard – the one shown in Wyczółkowski's painting. In his 1882 description, Father Polkowski incorrectly claimed that the sword had been "blessed by Pope Paul III" and presented to Sigismund Augustus so that he might be the "defender of the Christian faith".

- Medium: Pastel on paper on cardboard
- Dimensions: 149 cm × 96.5 cm.

=== Misa i dzban służące do liturgii Wielkiego Czwartku ===
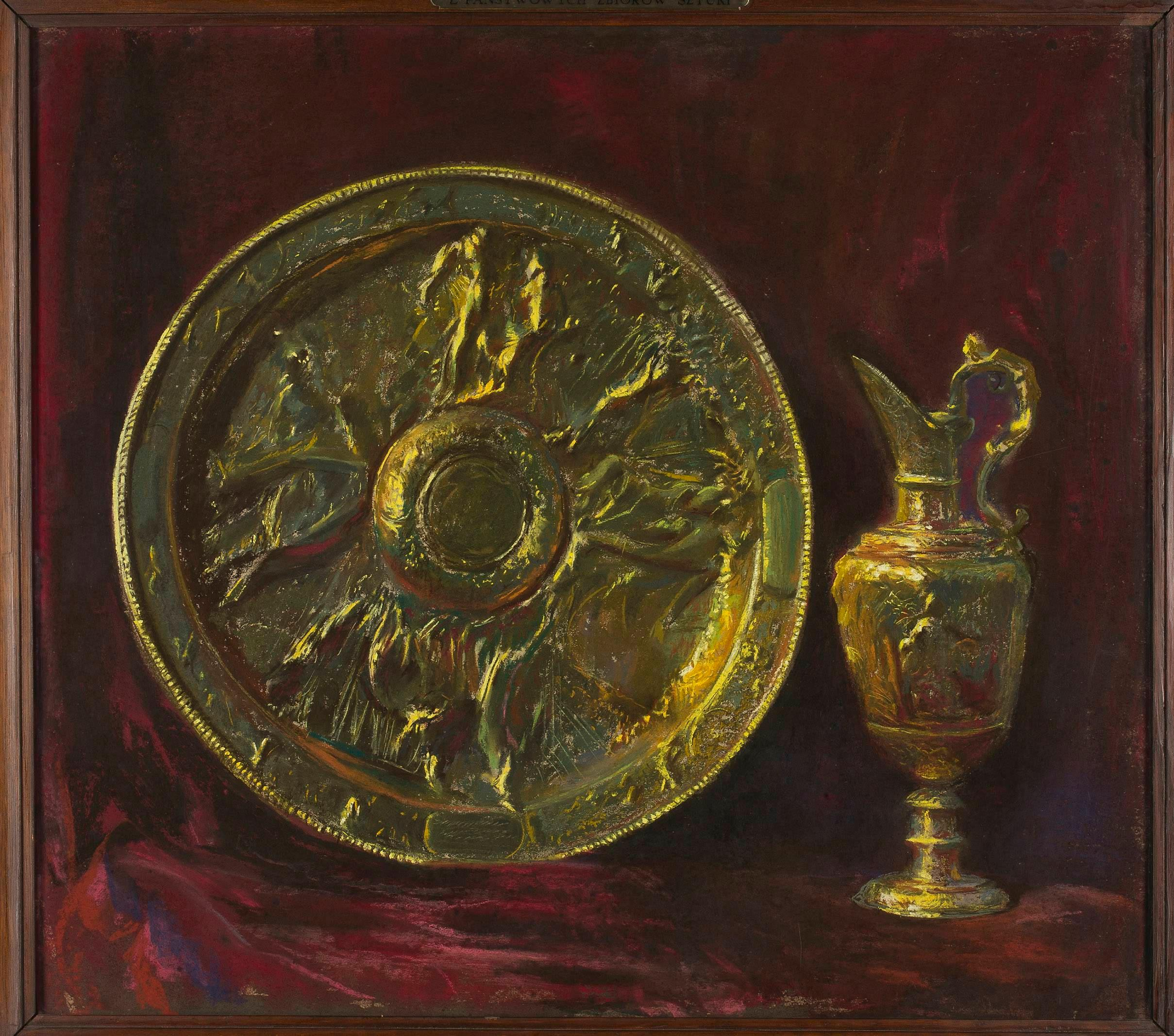
Misa i dzban służące do liturgii Wielkiego Czwartku

The painting Misa i dzban służące do liturgii Wielkiego Czwartku (Basin and Ewer for Maundy Thursday Liturgy) depicts a 17th-century basin and ewer from southern Germany or the Netherlands, used for the ritual of foot washing during the liturgy of Maundy Thursday. The objects have been held in the treasury since 1766, donated by Franciszek Potkański, auxiliary bishop of Kraków. The basin is adorned with scenes crafted by Jan and Raphael Sadeler based on drawings by Hans von Aachen, inspired by the graphic series Quatuor Europae Nationes, dedicated to Abraham Ortelius, the founder of modern cartography. The series depicts allegories of Italy (Venus and Apollo), Spain (Juno and Mars), Germania (Ceres and Bacchus), and France (Minerva and Mercury). The ewer, in turn, is decorated with personifications of the four elements, based on engravings by Adriaen Collaert. These two objects form a unified set, as they are believed to have once belonged to the Chodkiewicz family, as suggested by an engraved shield with the coats of arms Kościesza, Pogoń, Czetwertyński, and Trąby, along with the letters K-CH. K. W. M. K. S., which may refer to Castellan Krzysztof Chodkiewicz, Voivode of Vilnius from 1643.

This pastel stands out in the entire series for its use of color. The amaranth-colored velvet, golden objects, and shadows with touches of cobalt contrast with one another, producing an interplay of hues.

- Medium: Pastel on paper
- Dimensions: 79 cm × 89 cm.

=== Ornat fundacji Piotra Kmity ===
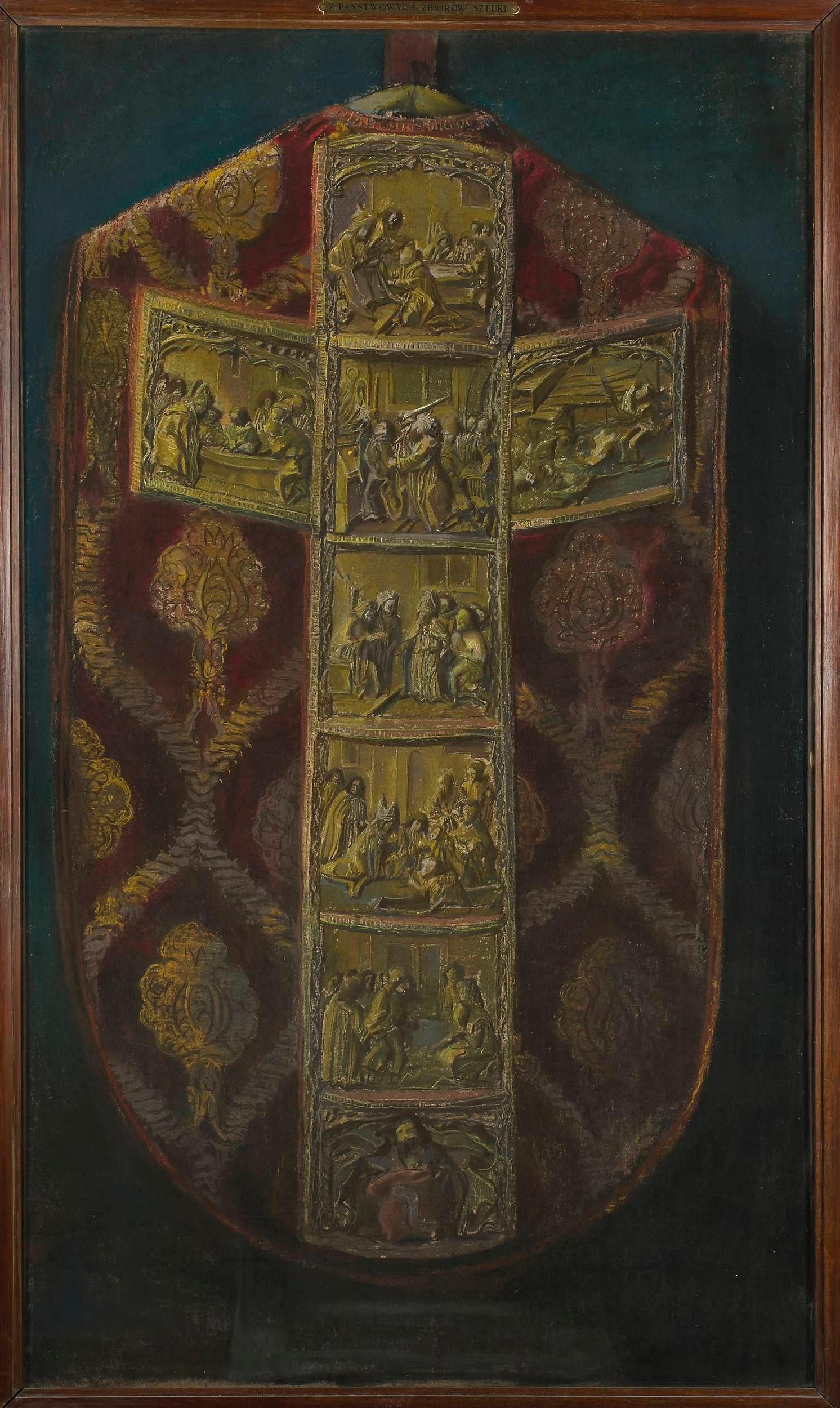
Ornat fundacji Piotra Kmity

Wyczółkowski's work Ornat fundacji Piotra Kmity (Chasuble of Piotr Kmita the Elder) depicts a late Gothic chasuble, now composed of the pretexta from the original vestment (created between 1501 and 1505), which was sewn onto an altenbas fabric in the second half of the 16th century. The pretexta contains a panel with the coat of arms of the founder, Piotr Kmita, as well as scenes from the life of Stanislaus of Szczepanów: The Purchase of the Village, The Resurrection of Piotrowin, Piotrowin Testifying Before the King, The Martyrdom of Saint Stanislaus, The Dismemberment of the Bishop's Body, The Burial, and The Canonization in Assisi. It was embroidered with silk threads in various colors and small pearls. The object depicted fills the entire field of the painting. The painting, which Wyczółkowski considered "the most finely crafted", has, however, darkened due to humidity and being stored in an improper frame.

- Medium: Pastel on paper on cardboard
- Dimensions: 168 cm × 98 cm
- Inscription: In ink on verso, "Kmita Chasuble"; pencil sketch of a Renaissance interior.

=== Racjonał i szkatułka królowej Jadwigi ===
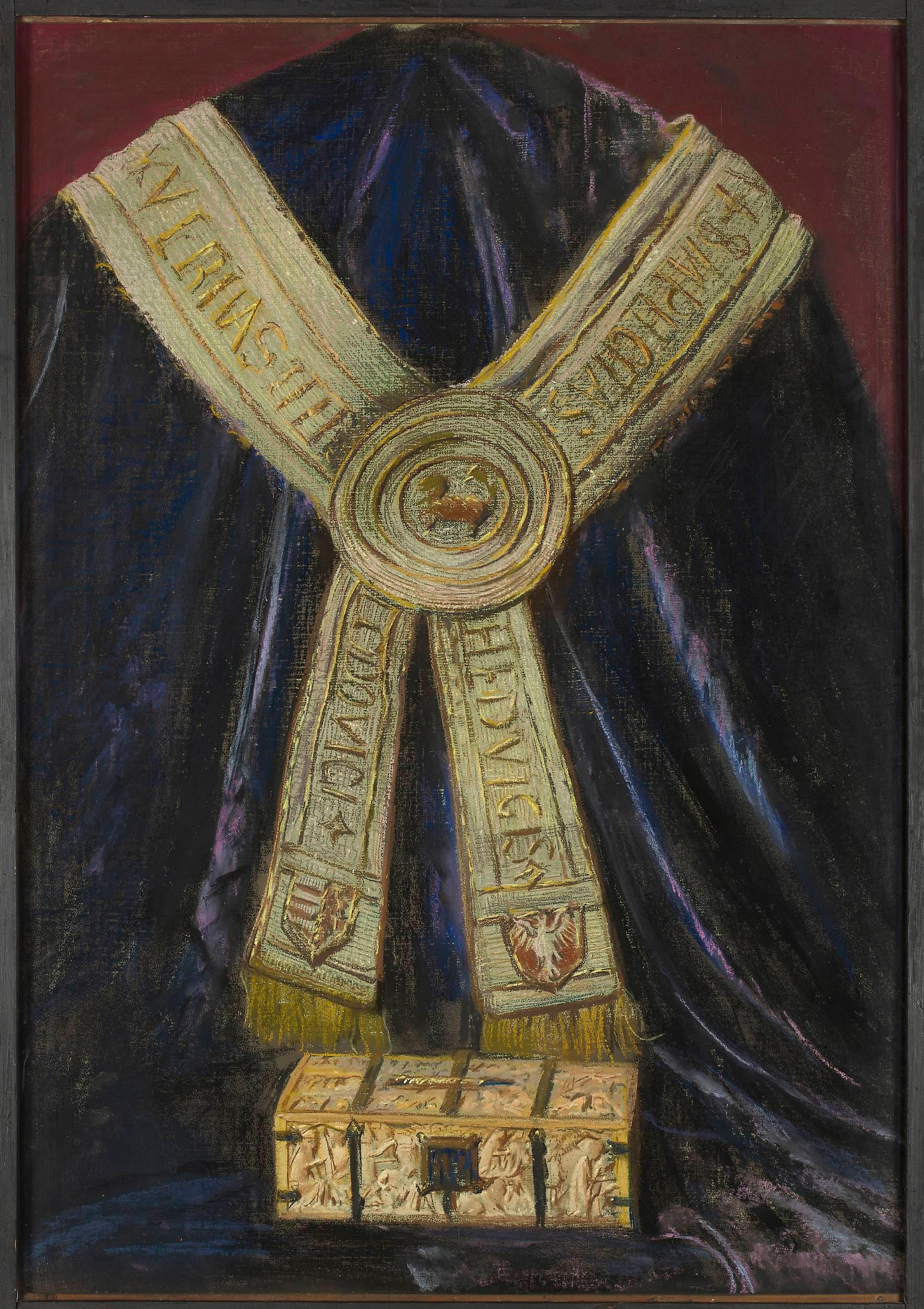
Racjonał i szkatułka królowej Jadwigi

One of Wyczółkowski's many works associated with Queen Jadwiga, Racjonał i szkatułka królowej Jadwigi (Rationale and Queen Jadwiga's Casket). The rationale donated by Queen Jadwiga was embroidered between 1384 and 1386 using silk and gold threads, along with hundreds of tiny pearls. It also features the coat of arms of the Angevins, the coat of arms of the Kingdom of Poland, and the image of the Lamb of God. An inventory from 1563 (prior to the object's restoration) recorded an inscription once embroidered on the rationale: Doctrina veritas et prudens simplicitas regina Hedvigis filia regis Ludovici (Learning, truth, and wise simplicity – Queen Jadwiga, daughter of King Louis). Before Wyczółkowski, this object had been depicted in paintings by Jan Matejko and Antoni Piotrowski.

The second object shown in the painting, a carved ivory casket adorned with scenes from medieval romances, is associated with the young queen's journey. It was made in the first half of the 14th century and likely originates from France. The casket was originally intended to hold relics of various saints.

The objects are highlighted by the contrasting background: a sapphire velvet fabric draped over a display form. The rationale, hung on this form, demonstrates how the vestment was worn.

- Medium: Pastel on paper on cardboard
- Dimensions: 99 cm × 70 cm.

=== Relikwiarz fundacji króla Zygmunta I ===
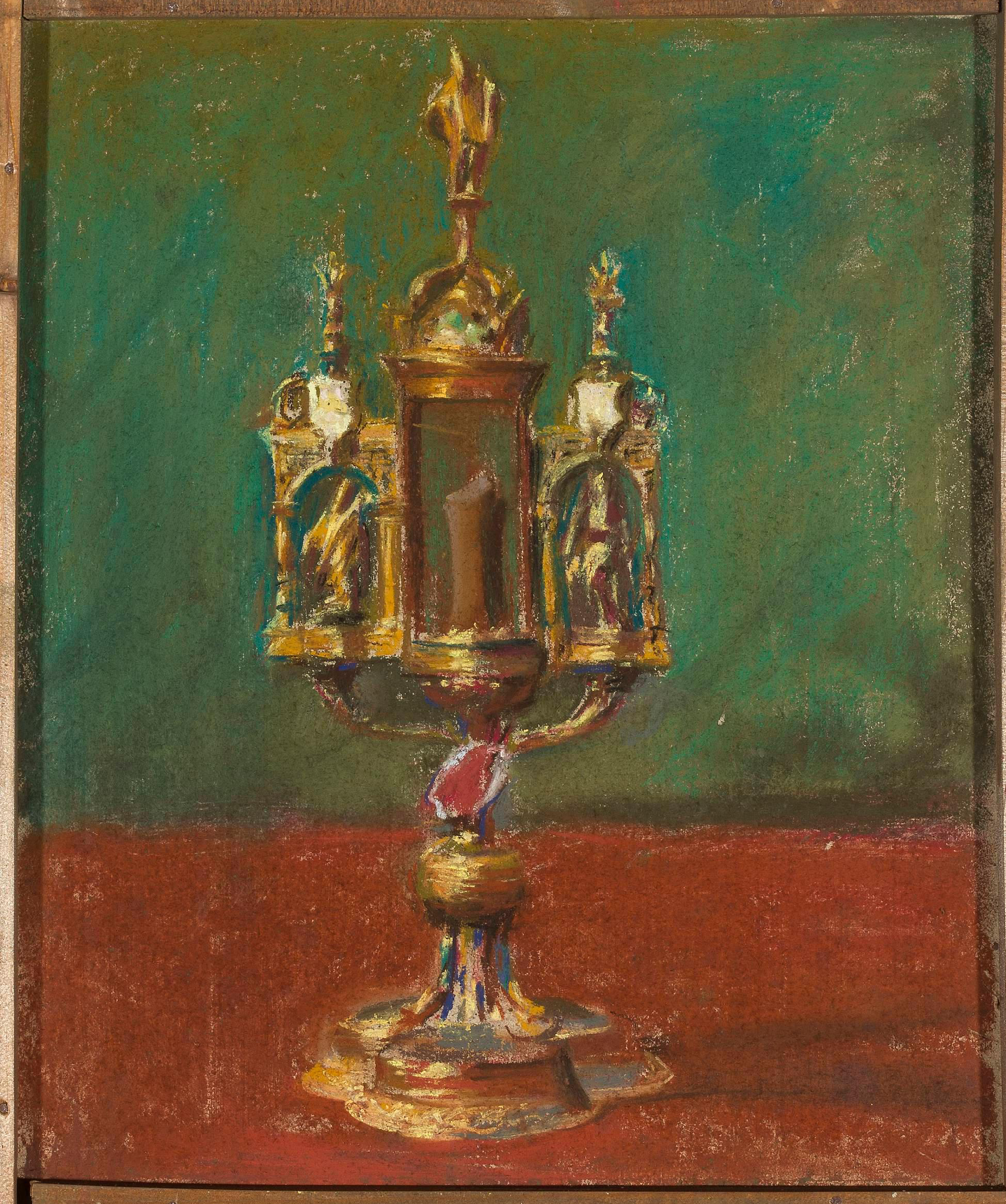
Relikwiarz fundacji króla Zygmunta I

The pastel Relikwiarz fundacji króla Zygmunta I (Reliquary of King Sigismund I) shows a 1533 Nuremberg reliquary for Sigismund of Burgundy's relics, funded by King Sigismund I the Old for the Sigismund's Chapel. It features coats of arm of Poland and the Sforza family and figures of Saints Stanislaus, Wenceslaus I, and Sigismund.

- Medium: Pastel on cardboard
- Dimensions: 38.5 cm × 31 cm.

=== Relikwiarze na głowę i rękę św. Stanisława ===
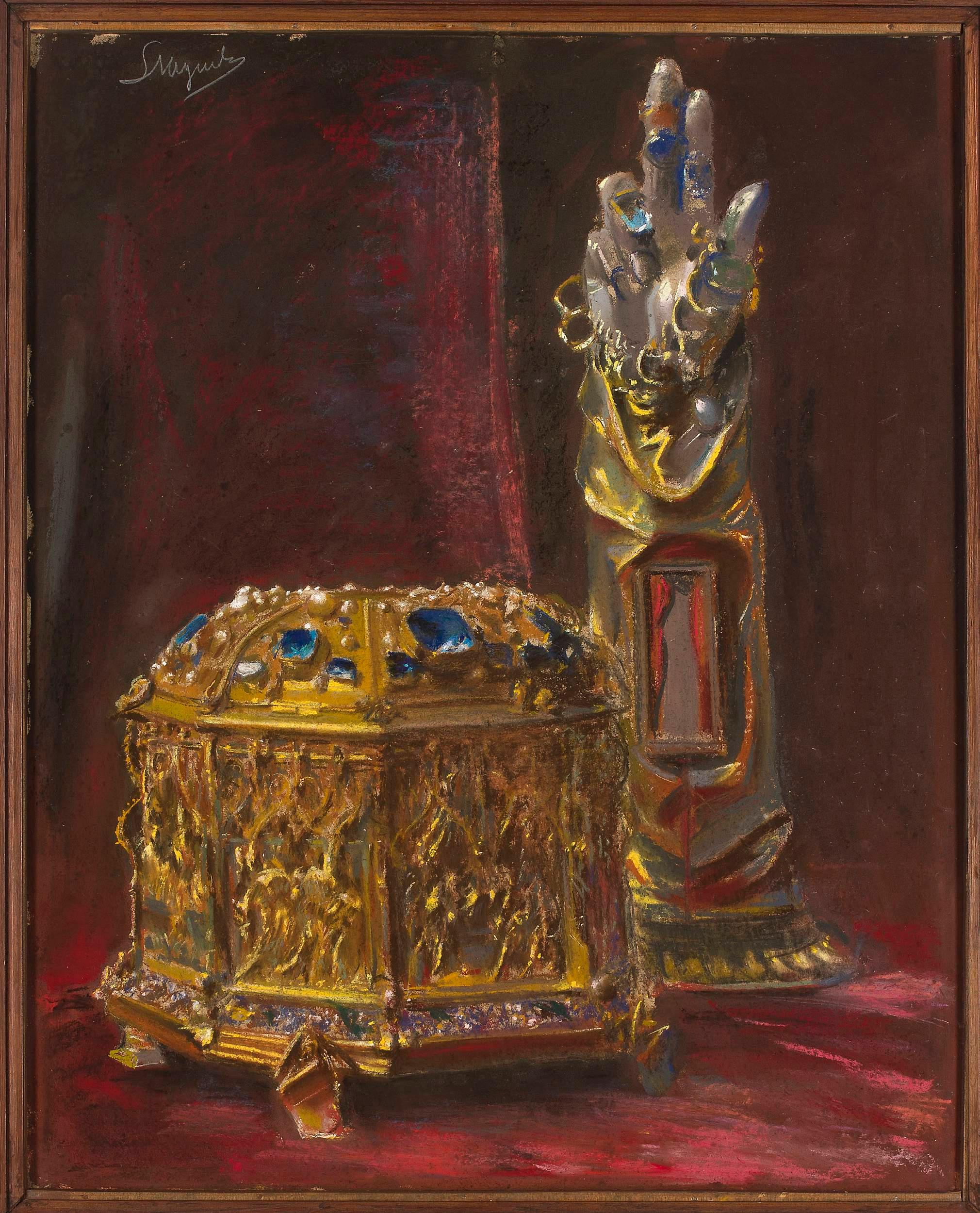
Relikwiarze na głowę i rękę św. Stanisława

In the painting Relikwiarze na głowę i rękę św. Stanisława (Reliquaries for the Head and Arm of Saint Stanislaus), Leon Wyczółkowski chose to depict the reliquaries of the head and arm of Saint Stanislaus against a background of dark, draped fabric. The object on the left – the casket for the saint's head – is an octagonal box topped with a flattened dome. Its upper section features tracery and pinnacled ornamentation, beneath which are scenes from the saint's life: The Purchase of the Village, The Resurrection of Piotrowin, The Testimony before the King, The Saint's Murder, The Dismemberment of the Body, The Eagles Guarding the Saint's Remains, The Funeral, and The Canonization in Assisi. The casket is supported on the shoulders of four angels holding the coats of arms of Poland, Lithuania, Cardinal Fryderyk, and Queen Elizabeth (of the House of Habsburg). According to Father Polkowski, this casket is the most valuable item in the Wawel treasury. Wyczółkowski placed it in the foreground of the composition, setting it in strong light to highlight the intricately crafted scenes from the saint's life and the gleam of sapphires and pearls. Next to the octagonal reliquary, in the background, Wyczółkowski depicted a hand-shaped reliquary containing a bone from Saint Stanislaus' arm. According to Father Polkowski's description, this reliquary is entirely made of silver and gilded throughout, except for the fingers.

- Medium: Pastel on paper on cardboard
- Dimensions: 72 cm × 58 cm
- Signature: "LWyczół" in pencil, top left.

=== Relikwiarz św. Floriana ===
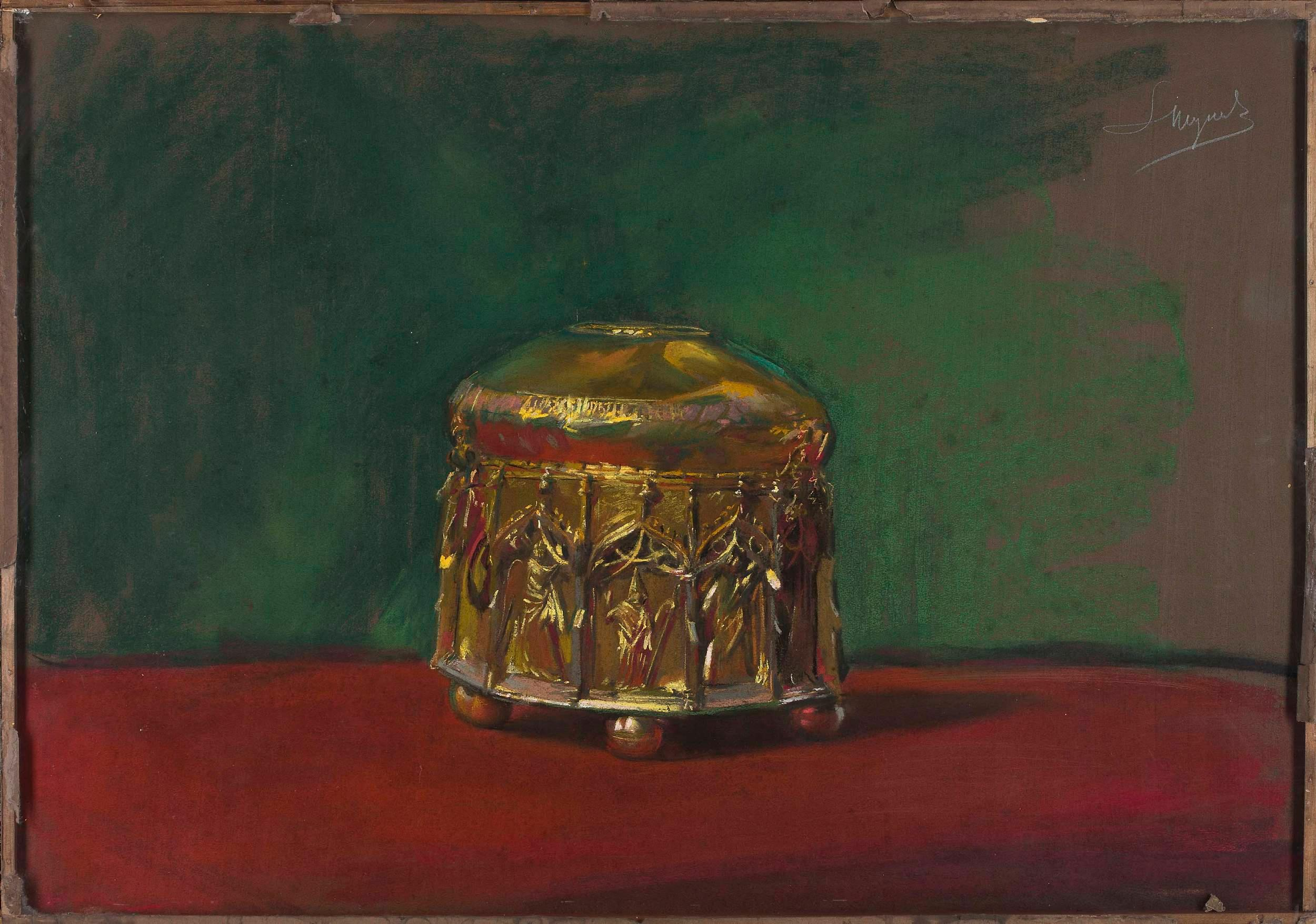
Relikwiarz św. Floriana

The pastel Relikwiarz św. Floriana (Reliquary of Saint Florian) depicts a 1424 reliquary, funded by the wife of Władysław II Jagiełło, Sophia of Halshany, which originally held Saint Stanislaus' relics, later those of Saint Ursula, and by the 17th century, Saint Florian's skull. Its niches depict bishops and angels. Wyczółkowski used focused lighting to highlight its form.

- Medium: Pastel on paper on cardboard
- Dimensions: 56 cm × 80 cm
- Signature: "LWyczół" in pencil, top right.

=== Relikwiarz z gwoździem Krzyża Świętego ===
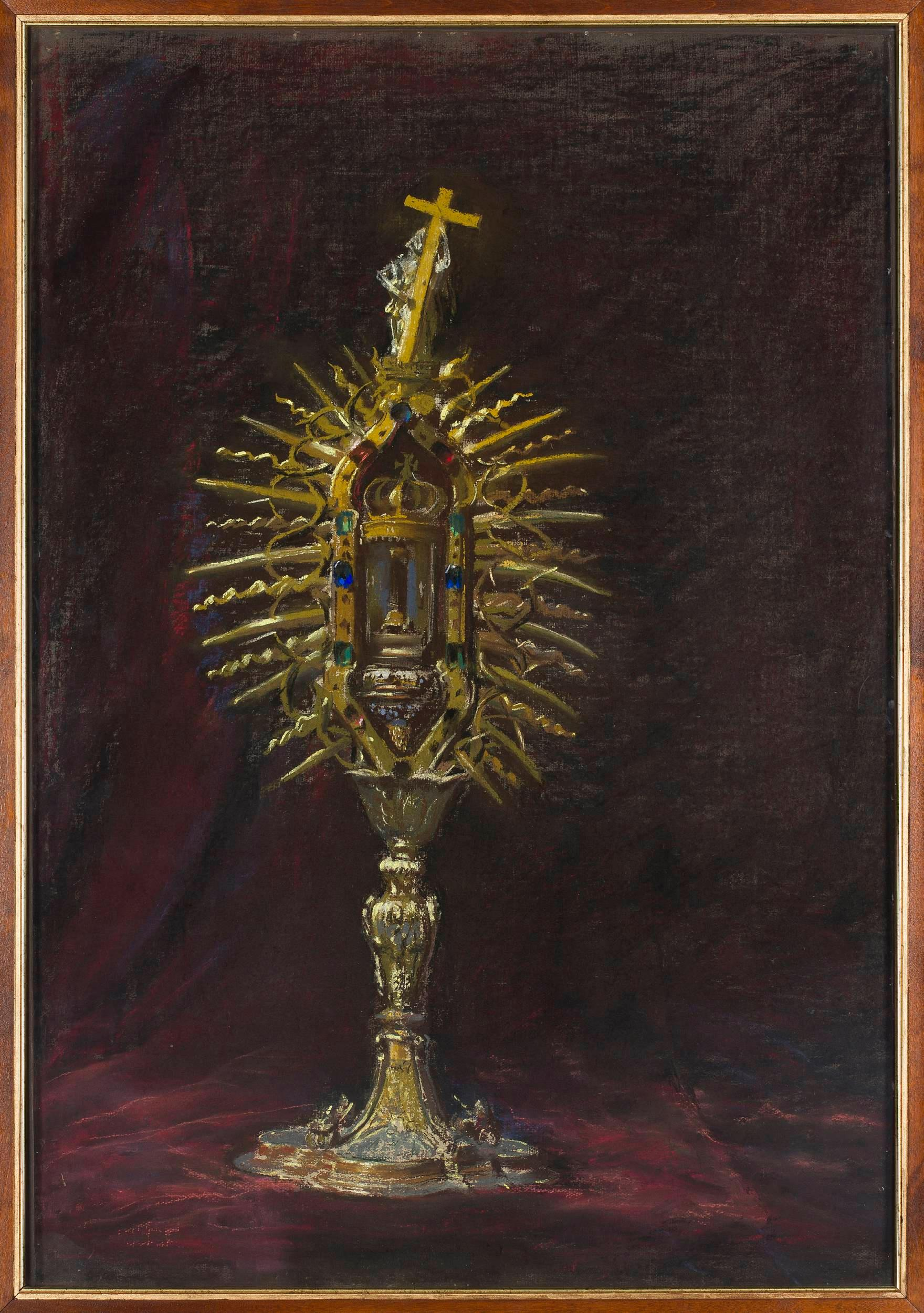
Relikwiarz z gwoździem Krzyża Świętego

The painting Relikwiarz z gwoździem Krzyża Świętego (Reliquary with Nail of the Holy Cross) depicts a reliquary, set against a scarlet velvet background and shaped like a monstrance, which holds a nail from the Holy Cross, donated by Pope Martin V in 1425. Commissioned by Cardinal Zbigniew Oleśnicki, it features Passion scenes and gemstones.

- Medium: Pastel on paper on cardboard
- Dimensions: 99 cm × 70 cm.

=== Sarkofag św. Stanisława ===
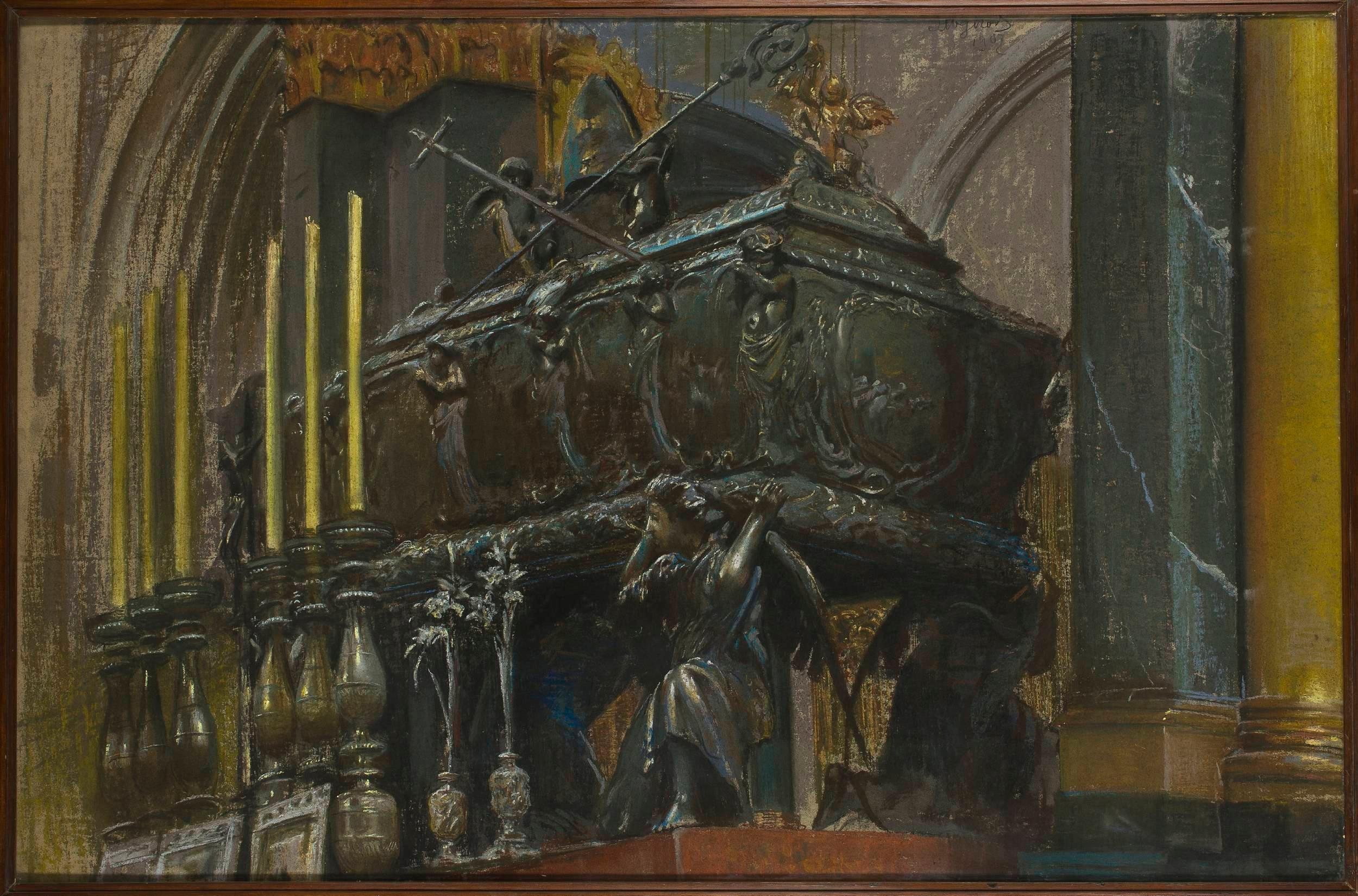
Sarkofag św. Stanisława

The painting Sarkofag św. Stanisława (Sarcophagus of Saint Stanislaus) depicts the silver coffin-reliquary containing the remains of Stanislaus of Szczepanów, located at the center of Wawel Cathedral. It is the only work in the cycle that does not portray an object from the cathedral treasury. The coffin was created between 1669 and 1670 using silver bequeathed in the will of Bishop Piotr Gembicki. The coffin and the angels adorning it are the work of Gdańsk goldsmith Peter von der Rennen, while the 12 medallions depicting hagiographic scenes from the life of Saint Stanislaus were made by Jakob Jäger, who worked in Augsburg.

Wyczółkowski depicted the sarcophagus at an angle, as it might be seen by a visitor to the cathedral. The artist captured the reflections of light that give the coffin plasticity. He used shadow to add depth to the composition. On the right side, a fragment of a column can be seen, harmonizing with a row of candles in baroque candlesticks and visually balancing the composition.

- Medium: Pastel on paper on cardboard
- Dimensions: 101 cm × 150 cm
- Signature: "LWyczół 1907" at top center.

=== Velum królowej Jadwigi ===
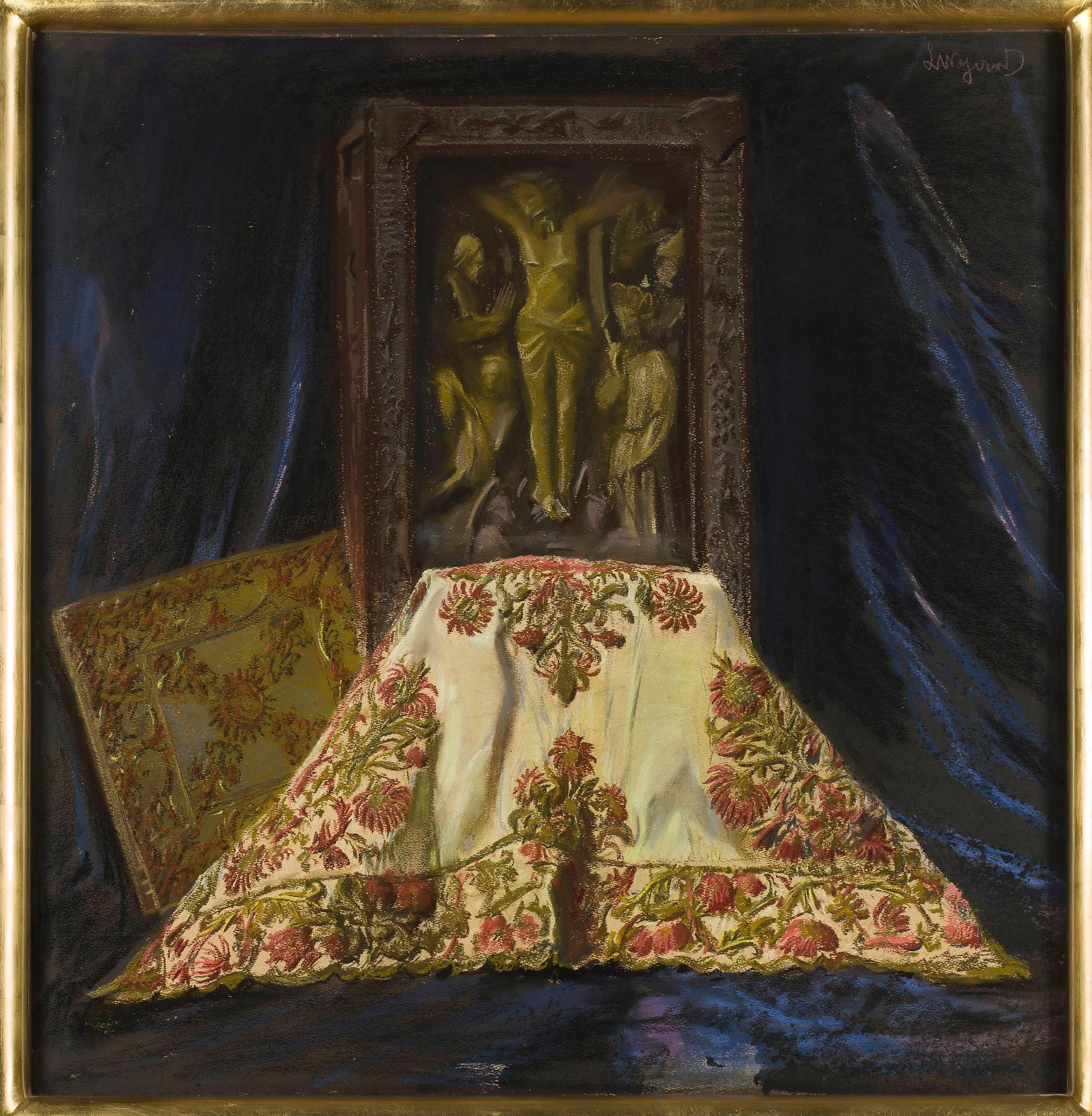
Velum królowej Jadwigi

The painting Velum królowej Jadwigi (Velum of Queen Jadwiga) depicts a velum (a cloth used for holding a monstrance), probably from the 17th century, adorned with a delicate floral motif embroidered on silk using beads. In the background, Wyczółkowski included a relief of the Crucifixion carved in alabaster, dating from the second quarter of the 15th century and originating in England. This relief may have originally been part of the furnishings of Wawel Castle. It was donated to the cathedral by the dean of the cathedral chapter in Kielce, Walenty Witkowski, in 1895. On the left side of the composition is a gremial – a cloth placed on the lap of a priest during liturgical services. This item may belong to a set with the chasuble of Cardinal Jan Aleksander Lipski from the second quarter of the 18th century.

- Medium: Pastel on paper on canvas
- Dimensions: 87 cm × 85 cm
- Signature: "LWyczół" at top right.

=== Złota Róża ===
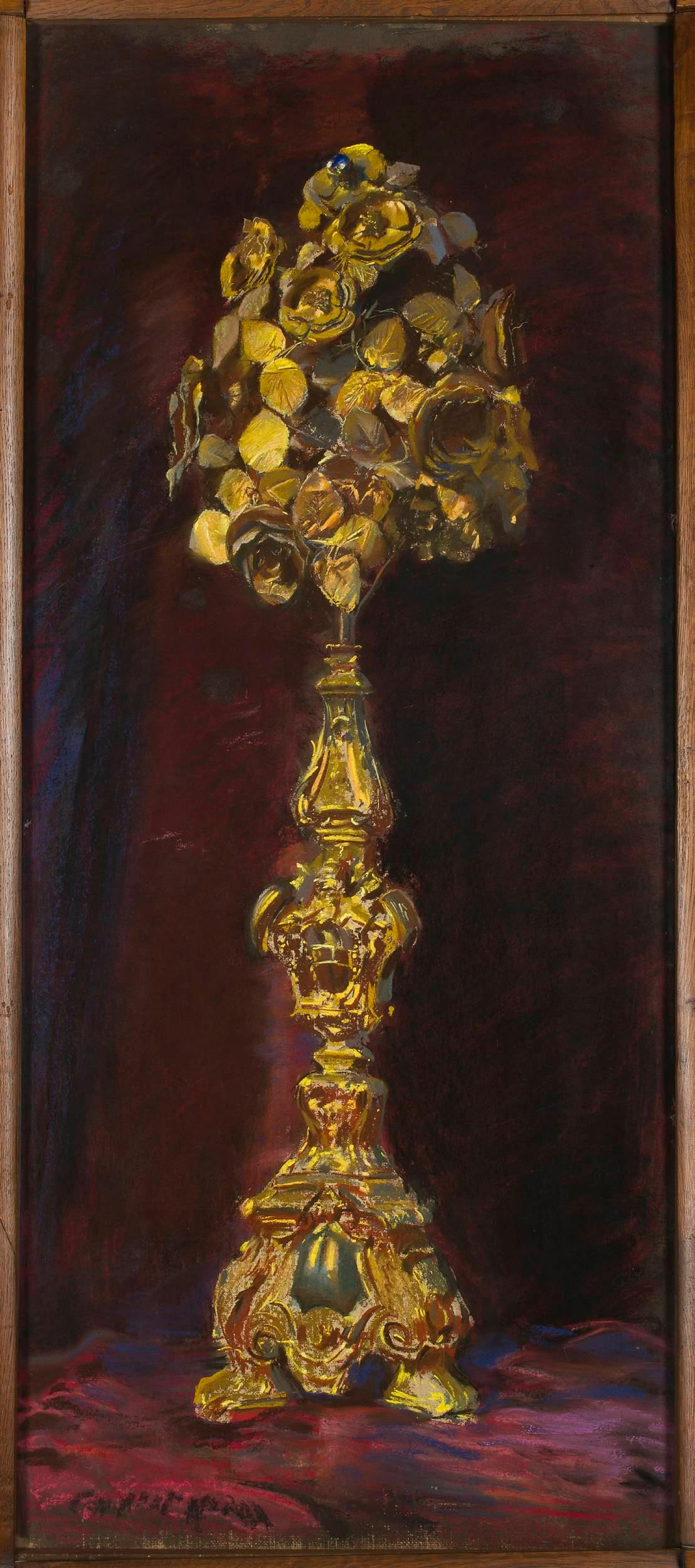
Złota Róża

The painting Złota Róża (Golden Rose) depicts the papal Golden Rose, offered as a votive gift to Saint Stanislaus in the will of Queen Maria Josepha in 1757. Maria Josepha was the wife of Augustus III and the daughter of Emperor Joseph I. The goldsmith's piece had originally been presented to the queen by Pope Clement XII in 1736 as a token of gratitude for her support of the Catholic party at the Protestant court in Dresden. It was not until 1801 that Maria Josepha's grandson, Prince Frederick Augustus I, fulfilled her will and donated the Golden Rose to the tomb of Saint Stanislaus. Since then, the object has remained in the cathedral treasury. The Golden Rose of Maria Josepha was crafted by papal goldsmiths. It depicts a branch bearing thirteen rose blossoms, with a sapphire mounted at the top of the highest one. The branch is set on an ornate, triangular base and features 151 leaves. The rose holds rich symbolic meaning: the gold represents the majesty of Christ, the highest rose refers to the Passion, the remaining 12 blossoms symbolize the apostles surrounding Christ, and the triangular shape of the base alludes to the Holy Trinity.

The Golden Rose of Maria Josepha had previously appeared in Polish art, including in a now-lost painting by Jan Matejko. In his own work, Leon Wyczółkowski depicted the rose close to life-size. The background is violet and slightly varied, emphasizing the plasticity and shine of the metal. The use of side lighting brings out the intricacy of the rose's construction.

- Medium: Pastel on paper on cardboard
- Dimensions: 115 cm × 50.5 cm.

== Reception by artists, critics, and art historians ==
The initial presentations of the cycle were met with great enthusiasm from the artistic community, critics, and art historians. Even before Skarbiec wawelski was shown in the lower hall of the Zachęta gallery in Warsaw in December 1907, it had already been hailed as "impressive".

In 1907, Tadeusz Jaroszyński remarked that Wyczółkowski was drawn to "the splendid pictorial quality of the Wawel treasures, the timeworn patina of ancient materials, the rust of iron, the gleam of gold and the shimmer of precious stones", and praised the artist's rendering of colors, gemstones, and the opulence of the treasury's objects, stating that it delighted and left no room for criticism.

In 1908, Zofia Skrobohata-Stankiewiczówna wrote in Bluszcz of the impression that the real objects themselves, rather than their representations, were present in the room housing the works from the cycle. "Wyczółkowski's pastels are the finest still life one could ever dream of in art", she stated. She praised the use of vivid, strong colors paired with subtlety and realism, also noting the mastery and confidence with which the artist applied patches of color.

Eligiusz Niewiadomski praised the use of pastel technique for capturing the treasury's objects, claiming that Wyczółkowski "explores all the secrets" of pastel and "reaches the limits of its possibilities".

Maria Twarowska, who prepared the foreword to the posthumous exhibition catalogue of Leon Wyczółkowski in 1937, paid special attention to the lyricism of the paintings in Skarbiec wawelski cycle and the richness of meaning they conveyed. She called them a continuation of Polish historical painting – without scenes or actors. In a later publication on Wyczółkowski, she emphasized the individuality of each work in the cycle, as well as their portrait-like quality.

Jerzy Malinowski, in an article from 1977, noted the artist's deliberate selection of treasures, which pointed to an intent to present the distinct history of each object.

== History of the cycle ==
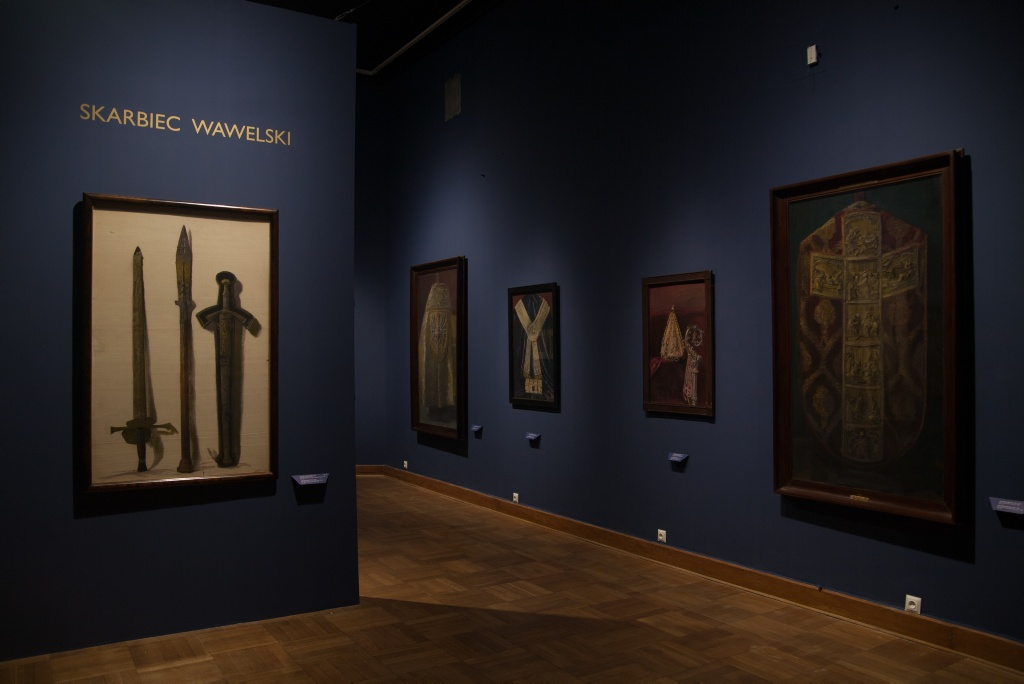
Cycle displayed at the Masters of Pastel exhibition, National Museum in Warsaw (November 2015 – January 2016)

Skarbiec wawelski was first presented at the "Ars" Art Salon in Kraków in October 1907. On 11 December that same year, an exhibition devoted to the cycle opened in the lower hall of the Zachęta gallery in Warsaw. Following these exhibitions, Leon Wyczółkowski intended to show the entire series abroad. However, longer journeys were not possible due to the fragility of the pastel technique. Only Sarkofag św. Stanisława was exhibited outside the territory of present-day Poland – in Vienna in 1908, marking the only international presentation of a work from the cycle to date. That same year, Polish art collector Dominik Witke-Jeżewski expressed interest in purchasing the cycle, intending to donate it to the National Museum in Warsaw. However, Wyczółkowski proposed a price the collector could not accept, and the sale did not take place. In 1912, another presentation of the entire cycle was held at Zachęta in Warsaw.

On 16 July 1919, the works were purchased by the Ministry of Art and Culture for 30,000 Polish marks. As such, Skarbiec wawelski became the foundation of the State Art Collections, officially established in 1922. Initially, the paintings decorated the dining room of the Presidential Palace. In 1926, they were shown at an exhibition of the State Art Collections at the Royal Castle in Warsaw. From May to July 1927, the cycle was displayed at the Polish Art in State Collections exhibition in the Barczyk House on Warsaw's Old Town Market Square. In 1932, eight pastels from Skarbiec wawelski were included in the permanent Gallery of Polish Art established by the State Art Collections in the Barczyk House. This display lasted until 1937, when a large posthumous monographic exhibition of Wyczółkowski's works was organized, featuring pastels from the cycle. Following that exhibition, in 1938, the series was placed on deposit at the National Museum in Warsaw. From then on, the entire Skarbiec wawelski – with the exception of Włócznia św. Maurycego – was exhibited in the newly created permanent Gallery of Polish Art.

During World War II, the Nazis removed Skarbiec wawelski from Warsaw. It returned to the National Museum in 1947. In 1989, by decision of the Minister of Finance, the cycle officially became the property of the National Museum in Warsaw. In 2002, selected works from Skarbiec wawelski were shown in the exhibition Leon Wyczółkowski 1852–1936. On the 150th Anniversary of the Artist's Birth at the National Museum in Kraków. In 2015, the entire cycle was displayed in a dedicated room at the exhibition Masters of Pastel: From Marteau to Witkacy at the National Museum in Warsaw.
