= Archbishop of Kraków =

Head of the Roman Catholic archdiocese of Kraków in Poland

The archbishop of Kraków (Polish: arcybiskup metropolita krakowski) is the head of the archdiocese of Kraków. A bishop of Kraków first came into existence when the diocese was created in 1000; it was promoted to an archdiocese on 28 October 1925. Due to Kraków's role as Poland's political, cultural and spiritual center, the bishops and archbishops of Kraków were often very influential in the city, country and abroad. From 1443 to 1791, bishops of Kraków were simultaneously Dukes of Siewierz, although it was only Adam Stefan Sapieha who officially abandoned the title.

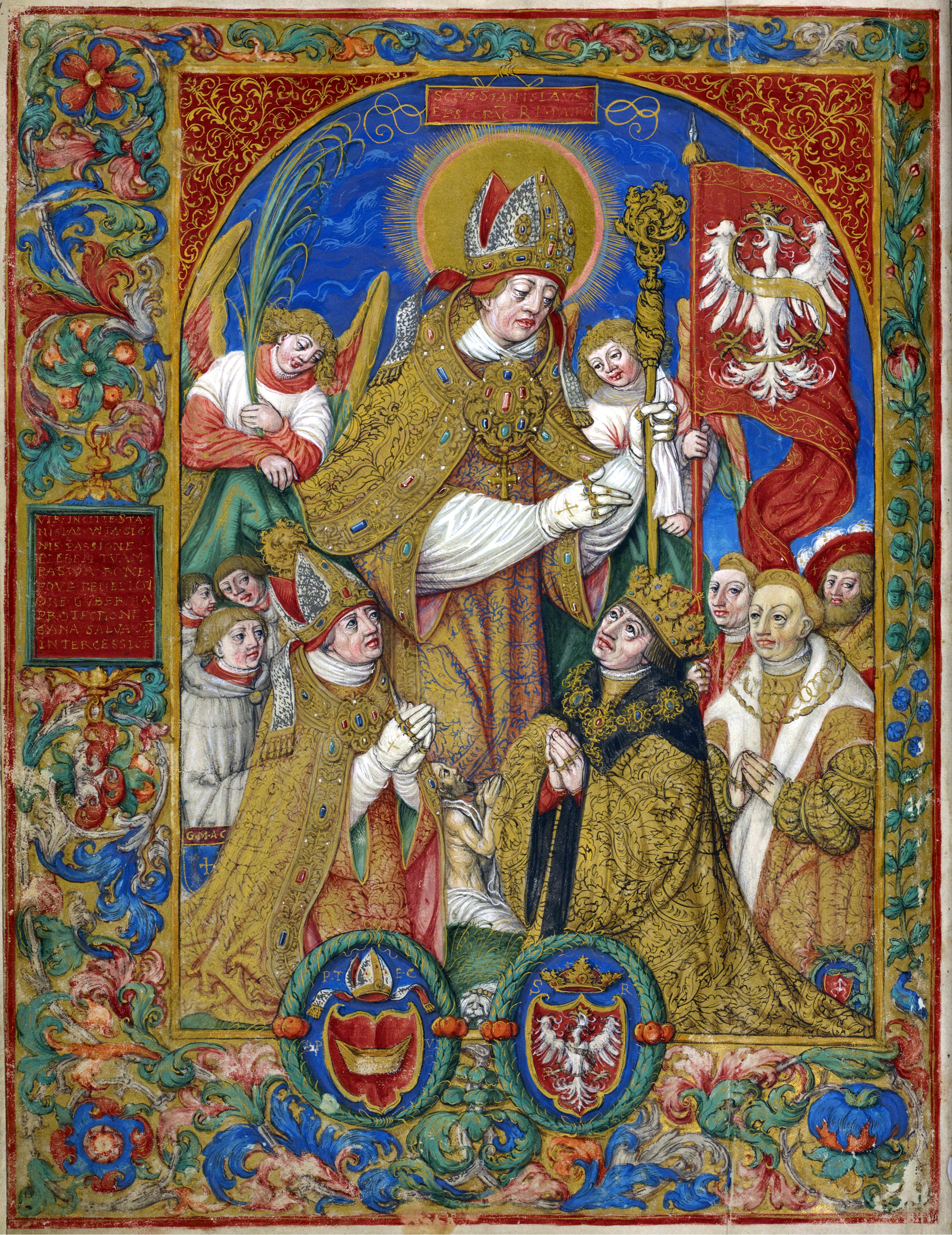
Saint Stanislaus

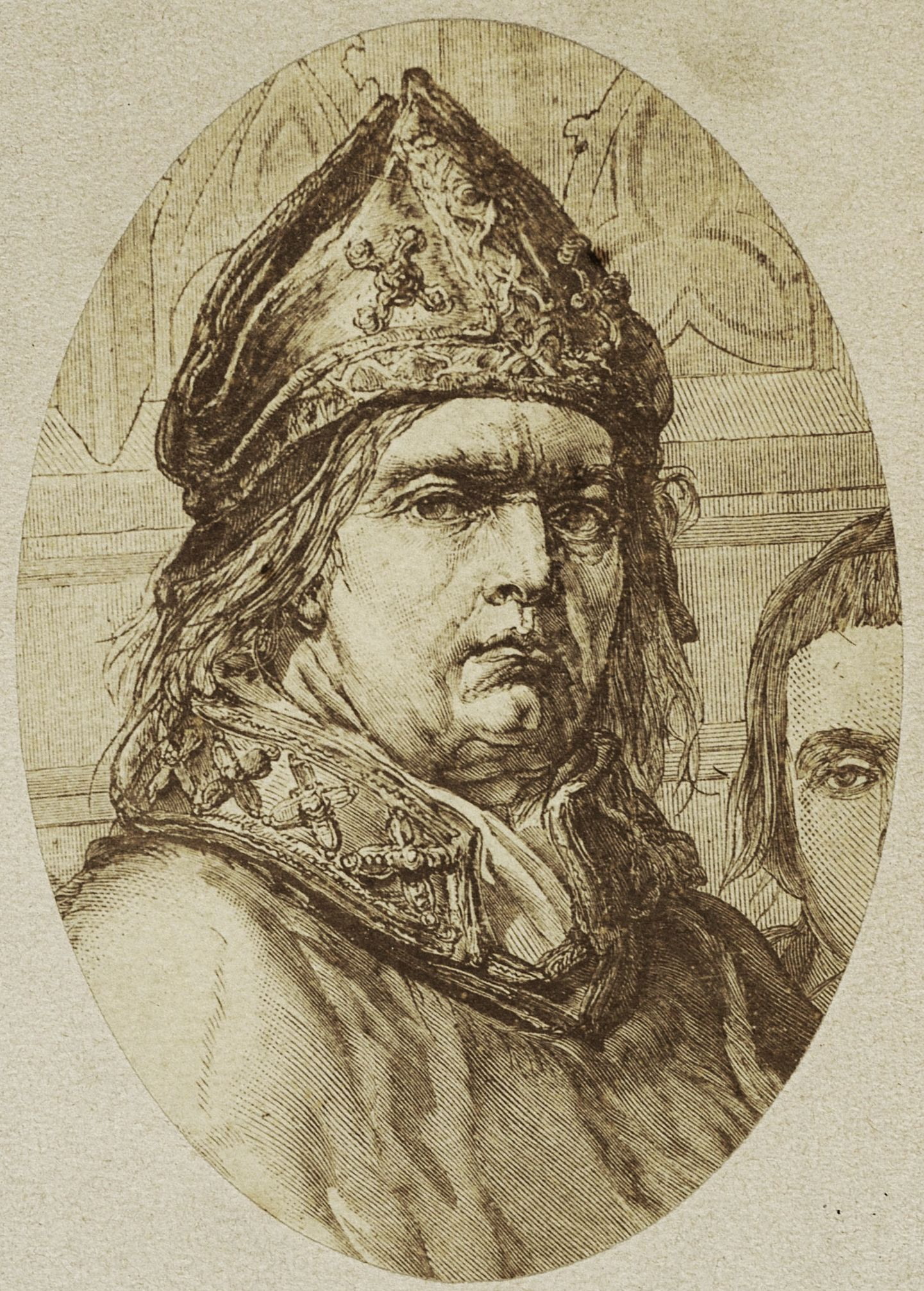
Cardinal Oleśnicki

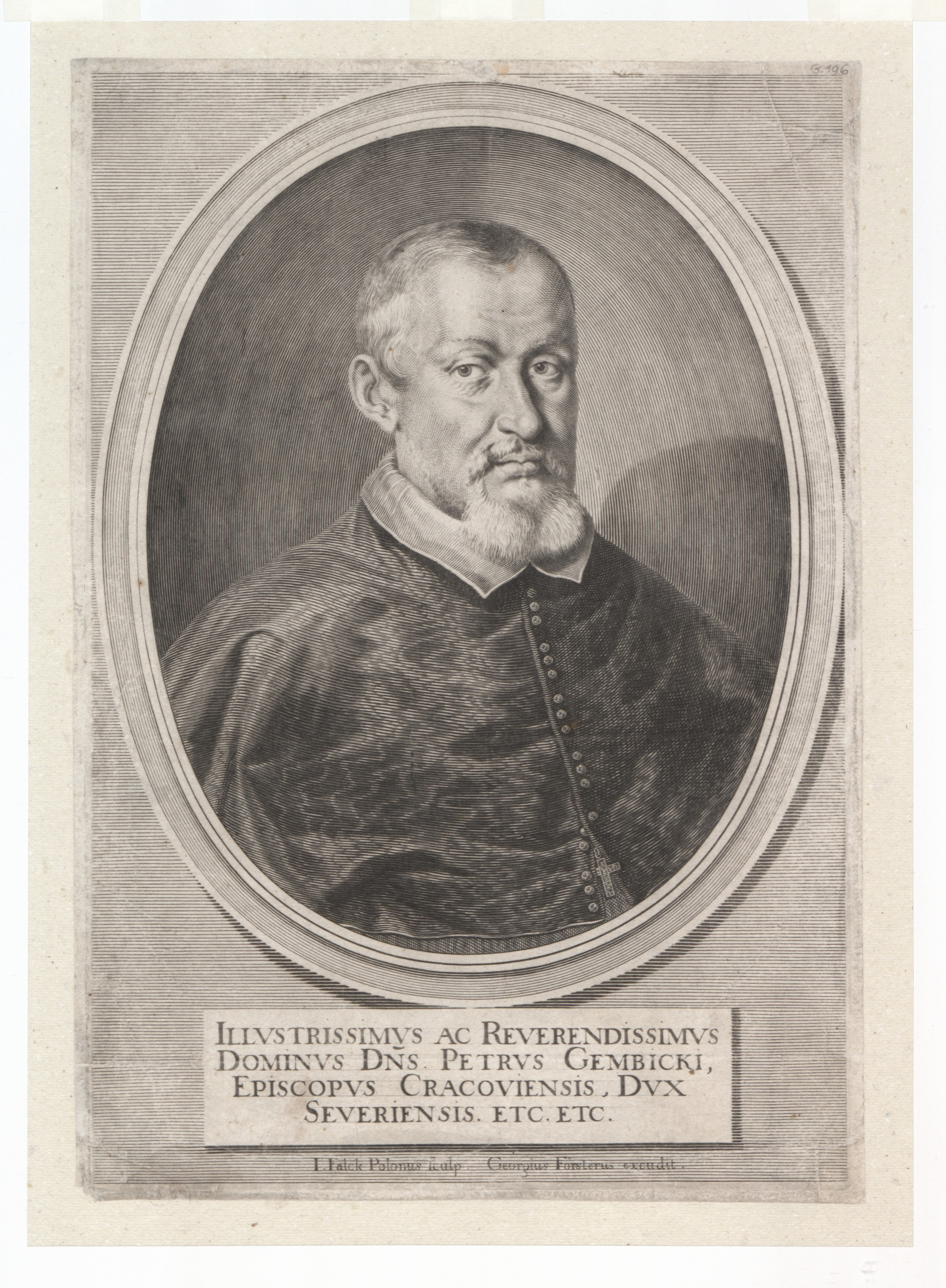
Piotr Gembicki

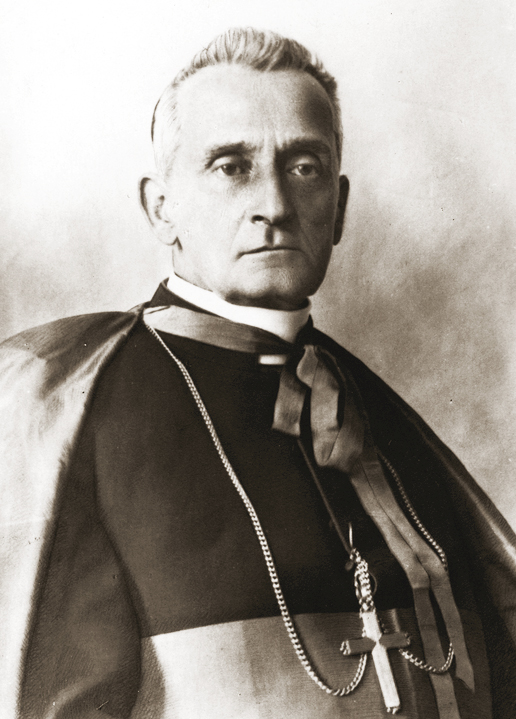
Cardinal Sapieha

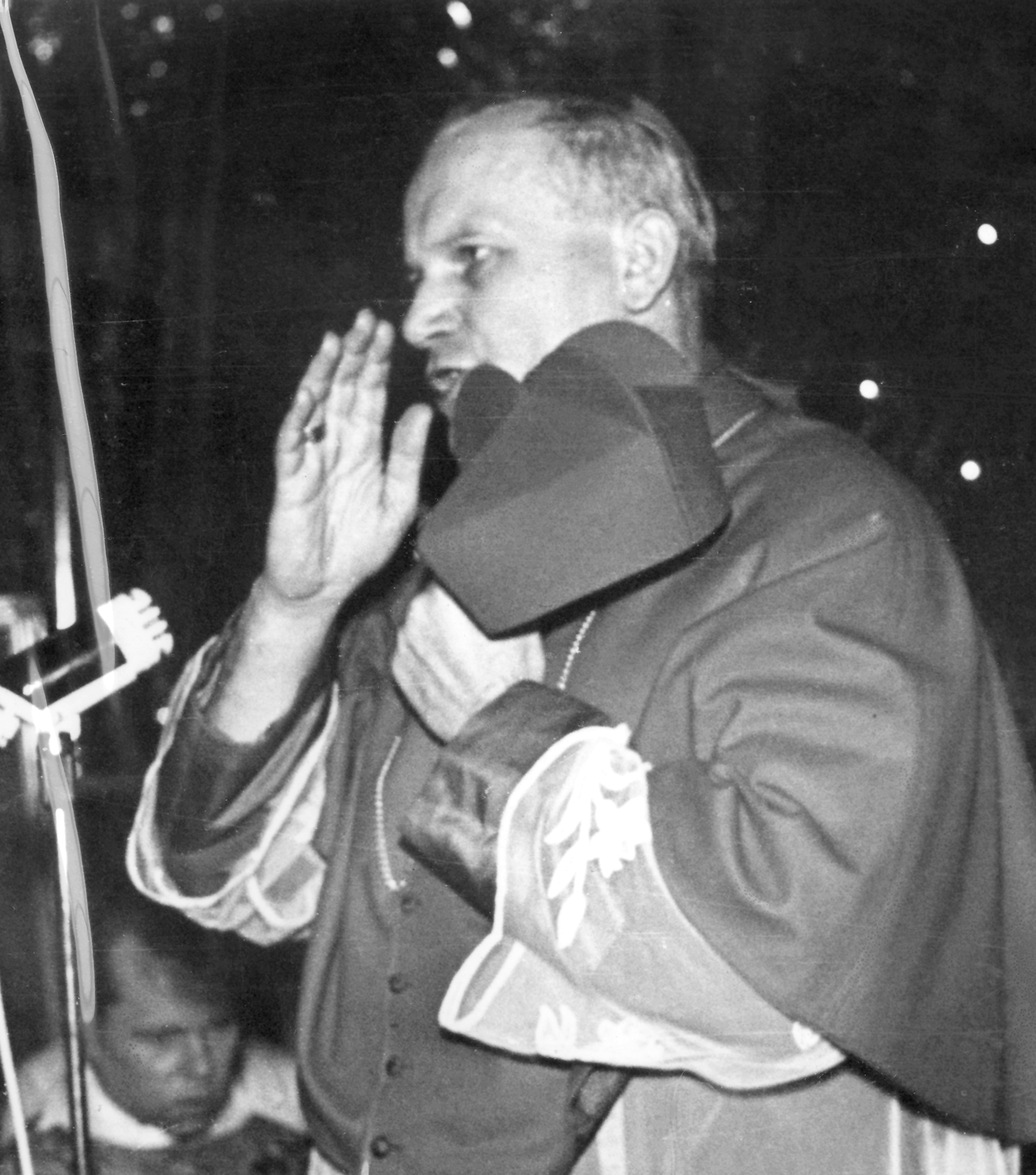
Cardinal Wojtyła (later Pope John Paul II)

List of bishops and archbishops of Kraków
#	Years	Name	Notes
1	1000–1014(?)	Poppon	
2	1014(?)–1023/30(?)	Lambert I	
3	1023/30(?)–ca.1032	Gompo	
4	ca.1032–ca.1046	Rachelin	
5	ca.1046–1059	Aron	
6	1061–1071	Lambert Suła	
7	1072–1079	Stanisław Szczepanowski	Martyr, canonized as Saint Stanislaus, co-patron saint of the diocese
8	ca.1082–ca.1100	Lambert III	
9	1101–ca.1103	Czesław	
10	ca.1103–ca.1109	Baldwin	
11	1110–1118	Maur	
12	1118–ca.1142	Radost	
13	ca.1142–1143	Robert	
14	ca.1143–ca.1165	Mateusz	
15	ca.1166–ca.1185	Gedko	
16	ca.1185–1207	Fulko	
18	1208–1218	Wincenty Kadłubek	Historian, author of the Polish Chronicle
19	1218–1229	Iwo Odrowąż	Ducal chancellor, established numerous monasteries in Southern Poland
20	1229–1242	Wisław Zabawa	
21	1242–1266	Jan Prandota	
22	1266–1292	Paweł of Przemankowo	
23	1292–1294	Prokop	
24	1294–1320	Jan Muskata	
25	1320–1326	Nankier Kołda	Ordered the construction of the Gothic Wawel Cathedral
26	1326–1347	Jan Grot	
27	1347–1348	Piotr of Falków	
28	1348–1366	Bodzenta of Września	
29	1367–1380	Florian of Mokrsko	
30	1380–1382	Zawisza of Kurozwęki	
31	1382–1392	Jan Radlica	
32	1392–1412	Piotr Wysz	Canonist
33	1412–1423	Wojciech Jastrzębiec	
34	1423–1455	Zbigniew Oleśnicki	Statesman, opposed the Hussites, acquired the Duchy of Siewierz for the bishopric, was made a cardinal by both Eugene IV and Felix V.
35	1455–1460	Tomasz Strzępiński	
36	1461–1463	Jakub of Sienno	
37	1463–1464	Jan Gruszczyński	
38	1464–1471	Jan Lutek	
39	1471–1488	Jan Rzeszowski	
40	1488–1503	Fryderyk Jagiellończyk	
41	1503–1524	Jan Konarski	
42	1524–1535	Piotr Tomicki	
43	1536–1537	Jan Latalski	
44	1537–1538	Jan Chojeński	
45	1538–1545	Piotr Gamrat	
46	1546–1550	Samuel Maciejowski	
47	1551–1560	Andrzej Zebrzydowski	
48	1560–1572	Filip Padniewski	
49	1572–1577	Franciszek Krasiński	
50	1577–1591	Piotr Myszkowski	
51	1591–1600	Jerzy Radziwiłł	
52	1600–1605	Bernard Maciejowski	
53	1607–1616	Piotr Tylicki	
54	1616–1630	Marcin Szyszkowski	
55	1630–1631	Andrzej Lipski	
56	1632–1633	Jan Olbracht Waza	
57	1635–1642	Jakub Zadzik	
58	1642–1657	Piotr Gembicki	
59	1658–1679	Andrzej Trzebicki	
60	1681–1699	Jan Małachowski	
61	1700	Stanisław Dąmbski	
62	1701–1702	Jerzy Denhoff	
63	1710–1719	Kazimierz Łubieński	
64	1720–1732	Felicjan Szeniawski	
65	1732–1746	Jan Aleksander Lipski	
66	1746–1758	Andrzej Stanisław Kostka Załuski	Founded the Załuski Library in Warsaw
67	1759–1788	Kajetan Sołtyk	
68	1790–1800	Feliks Turski	
69	1805–1813	Andrzej Gawroński	
70	1815–1829	Jan Paweł Woronicz	
71	1830–1851	Karol Skórkowski	
72	1879–1894	Albin Dunajewski	Cardinal in 1890
73	1895–1911	Jan Maurycy Paweł Puzyna de Kosielsko	Cardinal in 1901; submitted veto against Cardinal Rampolla in 1903 conclave. 4 Successions above Karol Wojtyla, later Pope John Paul II
74	1911–1951	Adam Stefan Sapieha	First Archbishop of Kraków in 1925; Cardinal in 1946; ordained Karol Wojtyla, future Pope John Paul II.
75	1951–1962	Eugeniusz Baziak	Archbishop of Lwów, Apostolic Administrator of Kraków, consecrated Karol Wojtyla, future John Paul II
76	1964–1978	Karol Wojtyła	Cardinal in 1967; later elected Pope John Paul II; later canonized, co-patron saint of the diocese
77	1978–2005	Franciszek Macharski	Cardinal in 1979
78	2005–2016	Stanisław Dziwisz	Cardinal in 2006
79	2017–2025	Marek Jędraszewski	
80	2025–	Grzegorz Wojciech Ryś	Cardinal in 2023

== Auxiliary bishops ==
Since 1303, the archdiocese of Kraków has frequently had one or more auxiliary bishops as well as the metropolitan bishop.

#	Years	Name	Notes
1	1303–1306	Marcin	
2	1347–1348	Jan	
3	1360–c. 1371	Tomasz z Sienna	
4	1395–1412	Zbigniew of Łapanów	Even though he left his duties in 1402 to serve as a parish priest in Gdów he was still documented as an auxiliary bishop of Kraków until 1412
5	1423–1444	Jarosław z Lublina	
6	1446–1461	Jerzy	
7	1464–1498	Paweł z Krakowa	
8	1499–1503	Marian Lulias	
9	1503–1526	Jan Amicinus	
10	1527–1544	Dominik Małachowski	
11	1544–1546	Erazm Ciołek	
12	1547–1559	Andrzej Spot	
13	1560–1565	Stanisław Słomowski	
14	1566–1577	Marcin Białobrzeski	
15	1578–1586	Jakub Milewski	
16	1587–1614	Paweł Dembski	
18	1614–1645	Tomasz Oborski	
19	1645–1657	Wojciech Lipnicki	
20	1658–1689	Mikołaj Oborski	
21	1690–1700	Stanisław Szembek	
22	1700–1705	Kazimierz Łubieński	
23	1706–1726	Michał Szembek	
24	1726–1751	Michał Kunicki	
25	1753–1786	Franciszek Podkański	
26	1786–1806	Józef Olechowski	
27	1787–1798	Wojciech Radoszewski	
28	1767–1807	Jan Kanty Lenczowski	
29	1811–1814	Augustyn Karol Lipiński	
30	1816–1830	Tomasz Nowina-Nowiński	
31	1824–1841	Franciszek Zglenicki	
32	1845–1868	Ludwik Łętowski	
33	1862–1879	Antoni Junosza Gałecki	
34	1900–1924	Anatol Nowak	
35	1927–1958	Stanisław Rospond	
36	1951	Eugeniusz Baziak	Appointed Apostolic administrator of Kraków in July 1951
37	1958–1964	Karol Wojtyła	Archbishop of Kraków from 1964-1978, later elected Pope John Paul II
38	1960–1992	Julian Groblicki	
39	1962–1988	Jan Pietraszko	
40	1970–1993	Albin Małysiak	
41	1970–1992	Stanisław Smoleński	
42	1985–1992	Kazimierz Górny	
43	1988–2004	Kazimierz Nycz	Created cardinal priest of San Martino ai Monti in 2010
44	1988–2022	Jan Szkodoń	
45	2004–2010	Józef Guzdek	
46	2004–2014	Jan Zając	
47	2011–2017	Grzegorz Ryś	
48	2011–present	Damian Muskus	
49	2018–present	Janusz Mastalski	
50	2020–present	Robert Chrząszcz	
