= Andrzej Trzebicki =

Polish Catholic bishop and nobleman

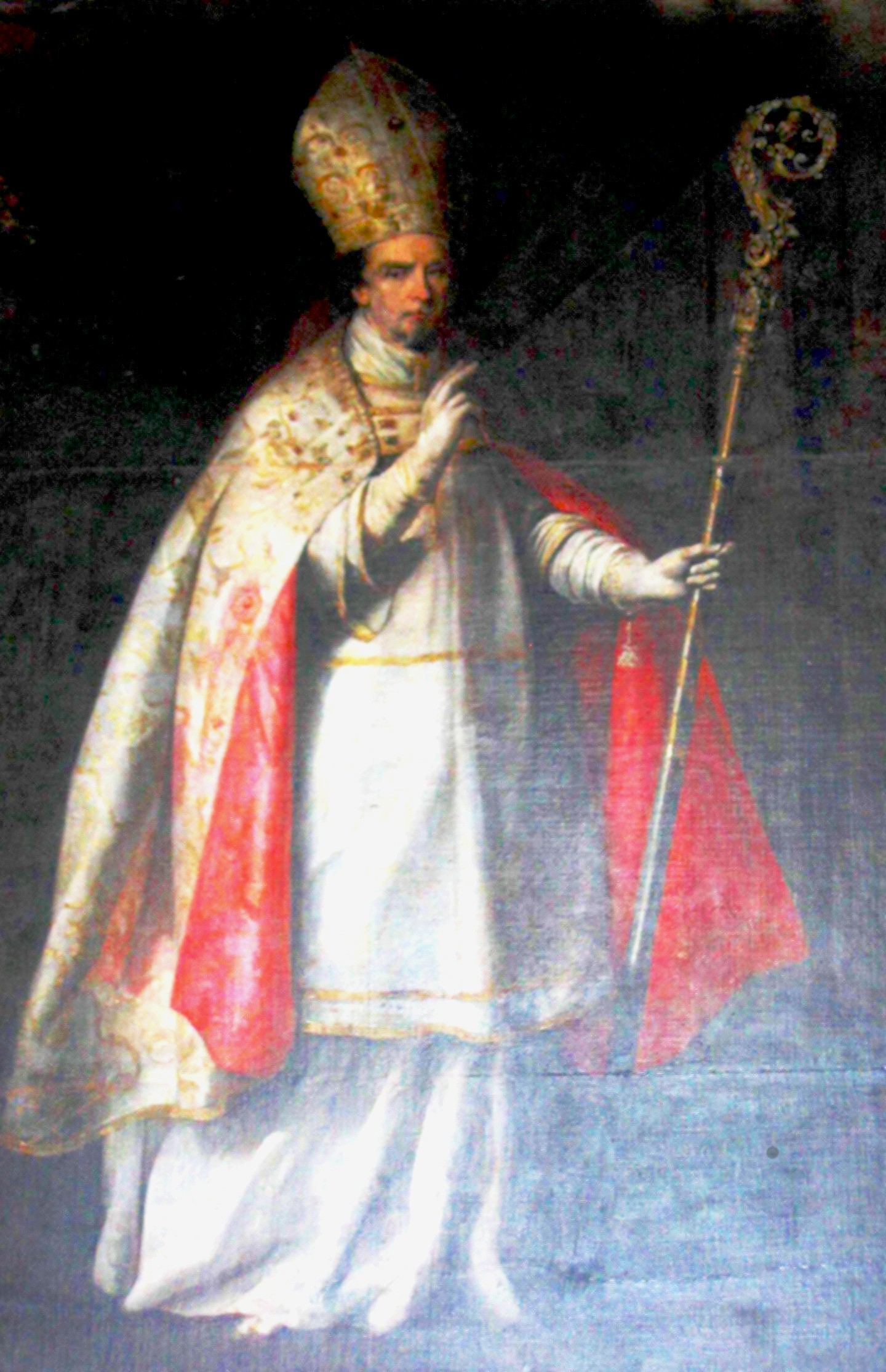
- Born: 23 November 1607
- Died: 28 December 1679 (aged 72)

Andrzej Trzebicki (23 November 1607 – 28 December 1679) was a nobleman and priest in the Polish–Lithuanian Commonwealth. Vice-chancellor of the Crown from 1653, bishop of Przemyśl since 1655, bishop of Kraków since 1658.

Loyal to king Jan Kazimierz Vasa, accompanied him during his exile and eventual return in The Deluge. Enemy of Protestants, his influence contributed to the exile of Polish brethren in 1658.

Preceded by Stefan Koryciński	Deputy Chancellor of the Crown; 1652–1658	Succeeded by Bogusław Leszczyński
Catholic Church titles
Preceded by Jan Zamoyski	Bishop of Przemyśl; 1655–1658	Succeeded by Stanisław Sarnowski
Preceded by Piotr Gembicki	Bishop of Kraków; 1658–1679	Succeeded by Jan Małachowski
