= Lambert Suła =

Polish bishop and noble

Lambert Suła was Bishop of Kraków from 1061 until his death in 1071.

According to tradition he may have come from the Piast dynasty. He was ordained in 1037, and mention of this fact is located in the Kraków chapter, which is attributed to Lambert. He is also mentioned in the 13th century Annals of the Kraków Chapter, which lists the names of the first nine Bishops.

He assumed the bishopric of Kraków after a two-year vacancy after the death of his predecessor Archbishop Aron. He oversaw the completion of the construction of the Romanesque Wawel Cathedral and was a reformer of the church in Poland and an ally of Bolesław the Bold.

He died on 22 August 1071.
