= Zabawa =

Zabawa may refer to:

== Surname ==
- Andrzej Zabawa
- Daniel Zabawa
- Wisław Zabawa

== Other ==
- Zabawa, Wieliczka County, Poland
- Zabawa, Tarnów County, Poland
- Zabawa coat of arms

== See also ==
- Zabava (disambiguation)
