= Tomasz Oborski =

Auxiliary bishop of Kraków

- Auxiliary Bishop of Kraków
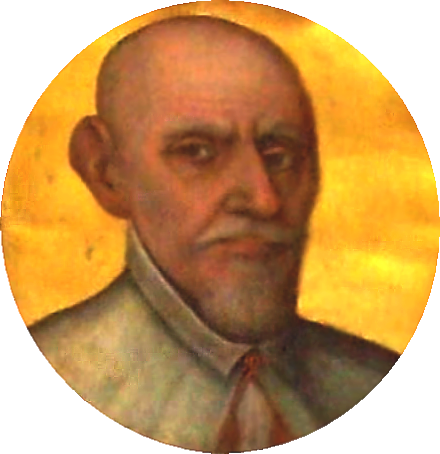
- Church: Latin Church
- In office: 22 September 1614 – 3 July 1645
- Other post: Titular Bishop of Laodicea in Syria (1614–1645)

Orders
- Ordination: ~1598

Personal details
- Born: ~1571
- Died: 3 July 1645

Tomasz Oborski (1571–1645) was the auxiliary bishop of Kraków from 1614 to 1645.
