= Radost =

Polish Catholic bishop (d. 1142)

- Bishop of Kraków
- Church: Catholic Church
- Archdiocese: Kraków
- Installed: 1118
- Term ended: 19 January 1142
- Predecessor: Maur
- Successor: Robert

Orders
- Consecration: 1118
- Rank: Bishop

Personal details
- Died: 19 January 1142

Radost (d. 19 January 1142) was a Polish Roman Catholic bishop. He was a bishop in the diocese of Kraków from 1118 to 1142.

== Biography ==
=== Origins ===
He was probably of Polish origin. According to Jan Długosz, he also bore the Latin name Gaudenty. On this basis, some scholars have suggested that he came from the Slavník dynasty. Długosz himself stated that Radost came from the Różyc family.

Radist was a Bishop and close associate of Bolesław III Wrymouth. His tenure lasted 22 years and ranks among the longest in the history of the Kraków Church.

As Bishop of Kraków, he became famous mainly as the founder of several religious buildings. Among other things, he continued the construction of the Romanesque cathedral at Wawel, which had been interrupted in 1125 by a tragic fire in Kraków, recorded in numerous Polish annals. This event significantly delayed work on the construction of Wawel Cathedral. Its consecration did not take place until 1142, exactly three months after Bishop Radost’s death. Furthermore, in the final years of his ministry, Radost gave permission to establish the oldest Cistercian monastery in Poland which is the Jędrzejów Abbey, within the then territory of the Diocese of Kraków (now the Diocese of Kielce).

Radost is also associated with the foundation of another Benedictine abbey, specifically the Convent of Święty Krzyż in Łysiec. Unfortunately, no further details are known about this foundation.

Radost died on 19 January 1142.

== See also ==
- Archbishop of Kraków
- Roman Catholic Archdiocese of Kraków
