= Rachelin (bishop of Kraków) =

Polish bishop

Rachelin, Bishop of Kraków (died 1046) was an early Bishop of Kraków from about 1030 to 1046AD.

His name is known from the 13th century chronicle “Sede Vacante w krakowski” which lists the names of the first nine Bishops, and Jan Długosz who accords that he was Italian and was consecrated Bishop by Pope John XIX. There is some doubt, however, over the historicity of this information and its more likely he was appointed by Mieszko II.

His Bishopric was dominated by the so-called Pagan reaction.
