= Kazimierz Łubieński =

Former Bishop of Krakow

- Bishop of Krakow
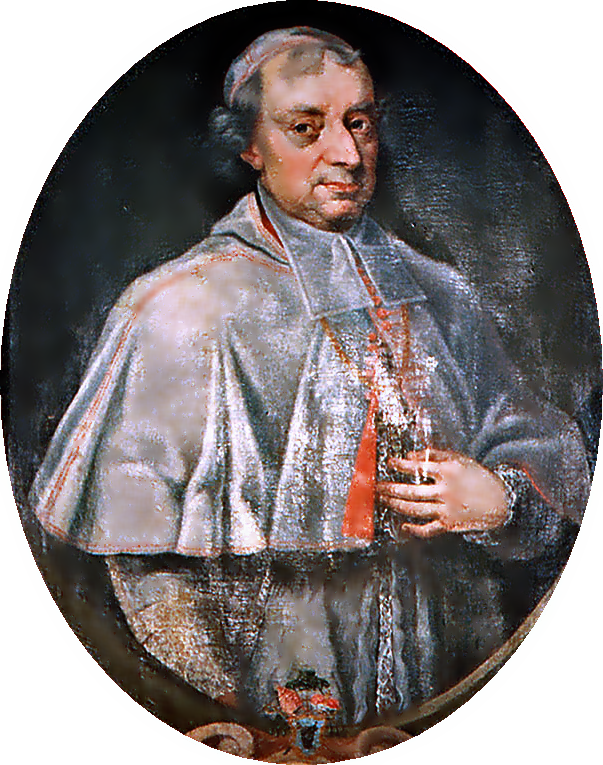
- Previous post: Bishop of Chełm

Personal details
- Died: 1719
- Buried: Wawel Cathedral

Kazimierz Łubieński (d. 1719) was a Polish nobleman who was Bishop of Kraków (1710–1719).

Kazimierz Łubieński was born into a noble family that claimed the Pomian crest.

As Bishop of Chełm, he donated 2,444 złoty to fund the academic Church of St. Anne.

In 1714, as Bishop of Kraków, he founded a Vincentian seminary in Lublin.

Łubieński died in 1719 and is buried in Wawel Cathedral. A monument and bust dedicated to him is located at the altar of St. Stanislaus.
