= Zabava =

Zabava may refer to:

- Zabava, Zagorje ob Savi
- Fictional Prince Vladimir's niece from Dobrinya and the Dragon
- Zabava Putyatishna, from a Russian bylina, rescued by Dobrynya Nikitich
- Zabava, Brest region, village in Belarus
- Zabava, Lviv Oblast, village in Ukraine
- Zabava, Mogilev region, village in Belarus
- Zabava, Yaroslavl Oblast, village in Russia

== See also ==
- Zabawa (disambiguation)
