= Baldwin (bishop of Kraków) =

Polish bishop and noble

Baldwin was a Bishop of Kraków in the years 1102-1109.

He was French and was recorded in both the Chronicle of Gall Anonim and Jan Długosz.

Bolesław III Wrymouth nominated him as candidate for the bishopric to the Pope and in 1102, he went to Rome for episcopal consecration which he received from Pope Paschal II. In 1103 he took part in the Synod of the Polish Church, on which the papal legate Gwalon (Papal Legate) made two Polish bishops. and during the Polish civil war he defended Zbigniew.
