= Jan Prandota =

Roman Catholic Bishop of Kraków

Jan Prandota (c. 1200 – 20 September 1266) was bishop of Kraków from 1242 to his death in 1266.

He was member of the Odrowąż family.

Prandota is recorded as having driven the Flagellants from his diocese, and was influential in achieving the canonization of Stanislaus of Szczepanów, whose relics he translated to Wawel Cathedral in 1245.

As part of an attempt in the 15th century by Bishop Zbigniew Oleśnicki to expand the cult of Saint Stanislaus, the tomb of Prandota was "miraculously and conveniently rediscovered" in Wawel Cathedral in 1454, lists of Prandota's miracles were recorded, and pilgrimages to the newly discovered burial site were encouraged. This veneration ceased in the 17th century, due to what the Catholic Encyclopedia called a misinterpretation of the 1634 bull De cultu servorum Dei of Urban VIII.
