= Jan Radlica =

Bishop of Roman Catholic Archdiocese of Kraków, Poland

Jan Radlica was a Polish clergyman and bishop for the Roman Catholic Archdiocese of Kraków. He was appointed bishop in 1382 and died in 1392.
