= Bodzenta of Września =

Polish clergyman and bishop

Bodzenta of Września or Jan Bodzanta (born 1290) was a Polish clergyman and bishop for the Roman Catholic Archdiocese of Kraków. He was appointed bishop in 1348. He died in 1366.
