= Jan Rzeszowski =

Former Bishop of Krakow

- Bishop of Kraków
- Predecessor: Jan Lutek
- Successor: Fryderyk Jagiellończyk

Orders
- Consecration: by Jakub of Sienno

Personal details
- Born: c. 1411
- Died: 1488

Jan Rzeszowski (d. 1488) was a Polish nobleman, soldier, and clergyman. He was Bishop of Kraków (1471–1488).

== Life ==
Jan Rzeszowski was born into a family that claimed the Półkozic coat of arms. In his youth, he took part in the Battle at Varna and managed to survive despite catastrophic losses experienced by the Poles and Hungarians. The king himself, Władysław III, and several of the king's personal soldiers were killed.

During his career as Bishop of Kraków, Rzeszowski pioneered the use of the printing press for the production and distribution of sacral literature. He commissioned Peter Schöffer's presses for this purpose. Other religious leaders in Poland eventually followed Rzeszowski's example.

Rzeszowski provided funding for the Collegium Iuridicum of the Kraków Academy.

According to Ludwik Łętowski, a later writer referencing Długosz, Rzeszowski was disliked by the clergy.
