= Jan Małachowski =

Former bishop of Krakow

- Bishop of Krakow
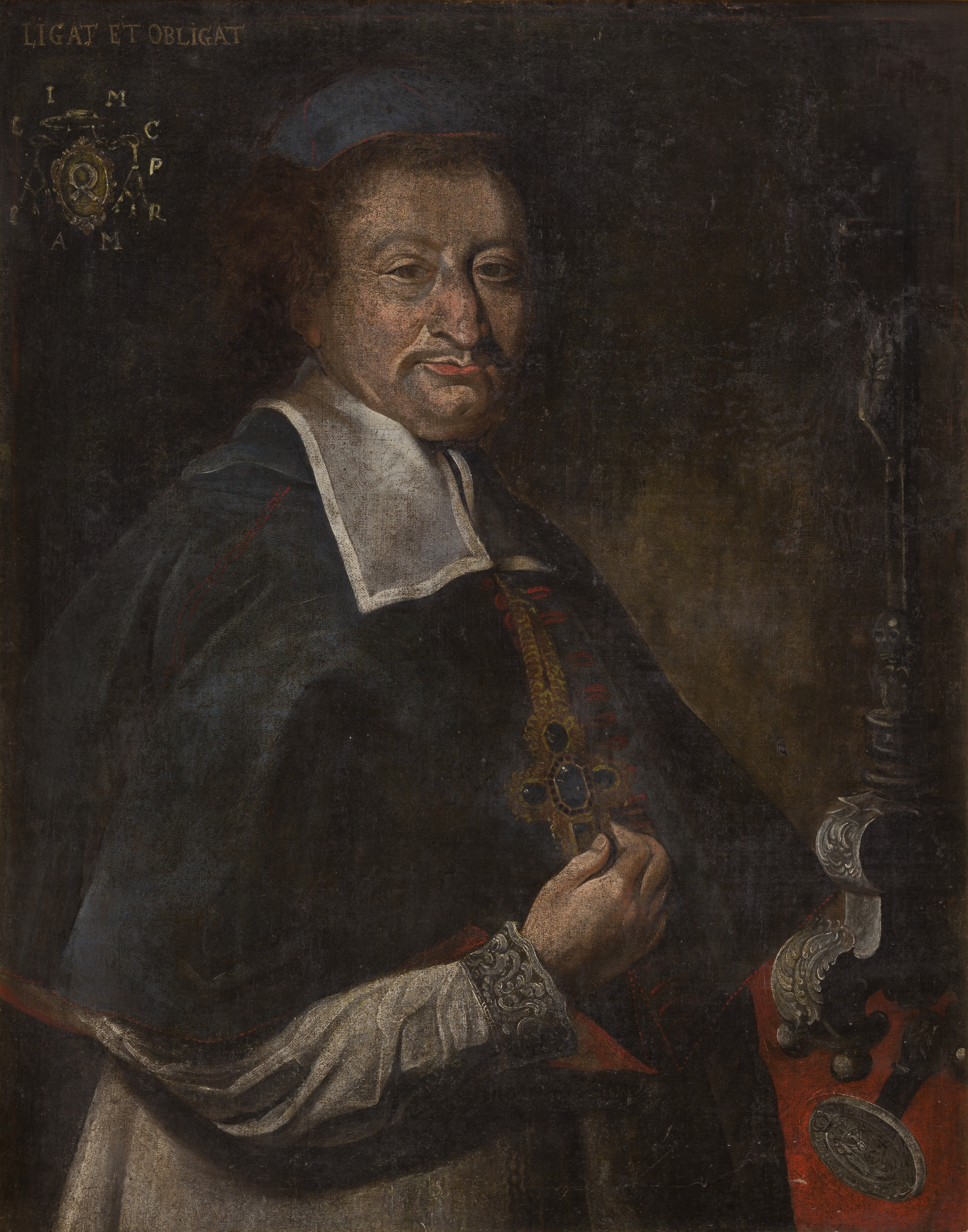
- Previous post: Bishop of Chełmno

Personal details
- Born: 1623
- Died: 1699 (aged 75–76)
- Buried: Wawel Cathedral
- Denomination: Catholic

Jan Małachowski (1623-1699) was Bishop of Chełmno (1676-1681), Bishop of Kraków (1681-1699), and Vice-Chancellor to the Crown.

== Life ==
Małachowski spent his early years serving in the military under Stanisław Rewera Potocki. He was married, but he joined the clergy when his wife died.

In the 1680s, Małachowski was active in Bodzentyn, organizing a popular mission there.

In 1695, Małachowski founded a church and convent for the Visitation Sisters in Kraków. The Order of the Visitation had been previously brought to Warsaw from France by Queen Louise.

Małachowski is known to have collected large tapestries, some of which he donated to the cathedral in Kraków.

Małachowski was buried in the crypt underneath the cathedral in Kraków.

== Legacy ==
The cathedral in Kraków contains a memorial to Małachowski that features a bronze bust. The memorial is near the altar of St. Stanislaus.
