= Aron (bishop of Kraków) =

Benedictine abbot and archbishop of Kraków

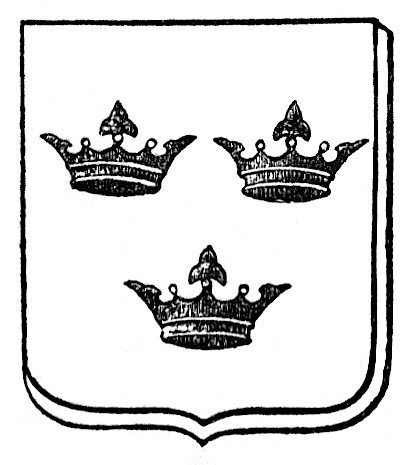
Coat of arms of Aron.

Aron was an 11th-century Polish Bishop of Krakow, then Archbishop and the first Abbot of the Benedictine house in Tyniec.

His name is known from the 13th century chronicle “Sede Vacante with krakowski” which lists the names of the first nine Bishops but which does not provide years. He arrived in Poland probably from Cologne, where the Archbishop was Hermann, uncle of Casimir the Restorer, or from Leodium.

He was at first the abbot of the Benedictine monastery in Tyniec but in 1046 he was made Bishop of Krakow. He was Bishop in Kraków from 1046 to 1059.

Because of the collapse of the Gniezno Bishopric during the dynastic struggles for the Polish throne and the Czech invasion by Duke Bretislaus I in 1039, the Pope raised the see of Kraków to be an archbishopric around 1049.

Prince Casimir the Restorer considered moving the capital of the Polish church to Kraków during his reconstruction of the church. Some researchers speculate, however, that Aron received the Pallium as a personal badge of honour rather than a restructuring of the church.

He was a strong supporter of Duke Casimir the Restorer, and an organizer of the Church in Kraków and a supporter of the Clunic movement. He is also credited with founding the library at Kraków. The chapter of Kraków has adopted for his personal coat of arms.

He died in 1059, either on 15 May or on 9 October. Bishop Aron is a character in the historical novel, Silver Eagles by Teodor Parnicki.
