= Wisław Zabawa =

Polish clergyman and bishop

Wisław Zabawa was a Polish clergyman and bishop for the Roman Catholic Archdiocese of Kraków. He became ordained in 1231. He was appointed bishop in 1231. He died in 1242.
