= Piotr Gembicki =

Polish bishop (1585–1657)

- Bishop of Przemyśl; Bishop of Kraków
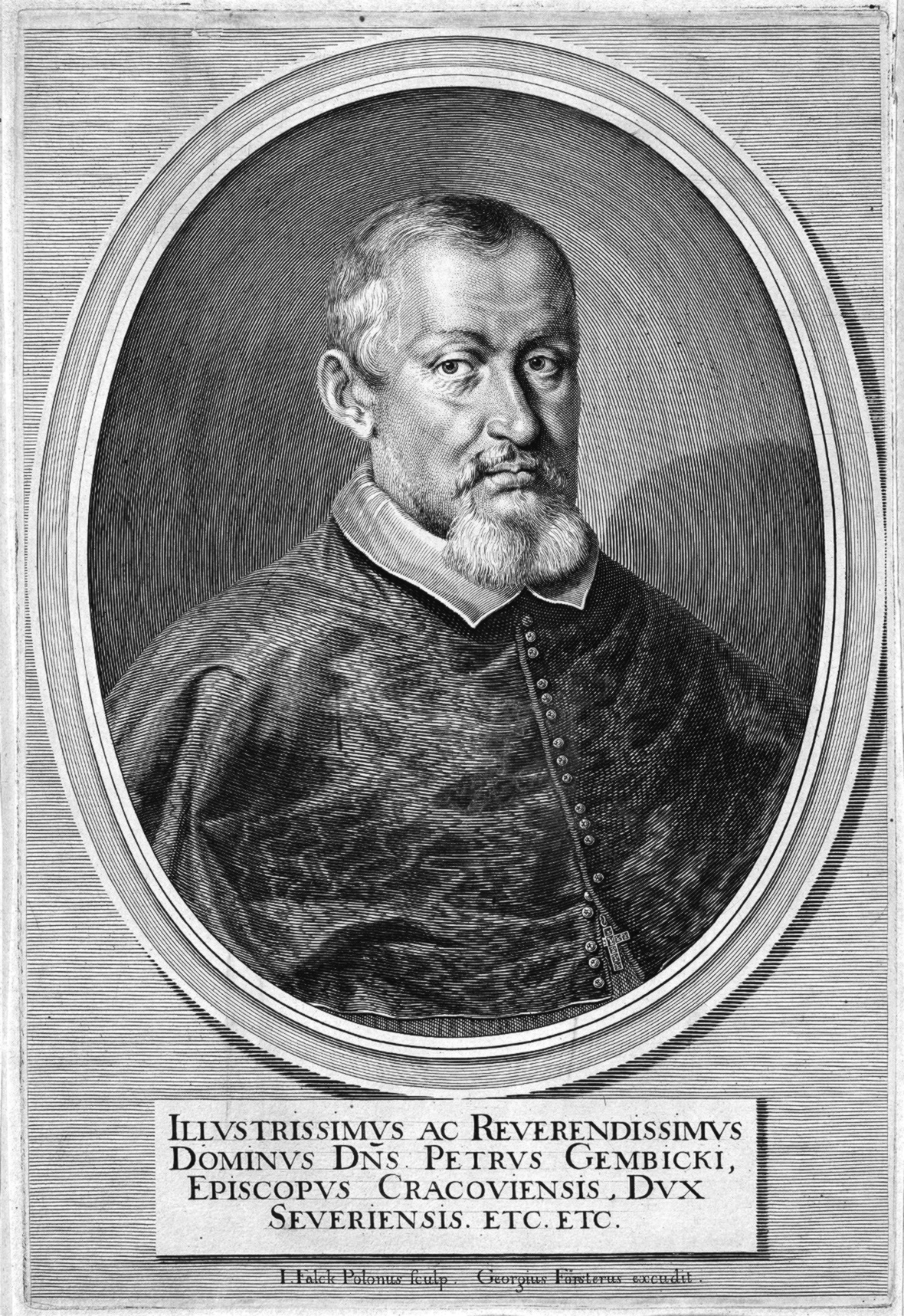
- Installed: 22 September 1636 (Przemyśl); 10 November 1642 (Kraków)

Personal details
- Born: 10 October 1585 Gniezno, Kingdom of Poland
- Died: 14 July 1657 (aged 71) Racibórz, Holy Roman Empire (now Poland)

Piotr Gembicki (10 October, 1585 – 14 July, 1657), was a Polish Bishop that served as the Deputy Crown Chancellor and Bishop of Przemyśl from 1636, Grand Crown Chancellor from 1638, and Bishop of Kraków from 1642 in the Polish–Lithuanian Commonwealth.

== Biography ==
Piotr Gembicki was born into a Polish noble family of Nałęcz coat of arms in Gniezno on 10 October 1585 and began his ecclesiastical career early and attended academies abroad. Later he became the secretary of King Sigismund III Vasa and regent of the Crown's Chancery. After Sigismund's son, Władysław IV Vasa, succeeded to the Polish throne in 1632, Gembicki led the diplomatic mission to Ferdinand II, Holy Roman Emperor. In 1635 he took part in the negotiations with Muscovy following the Smolensk War. In December 1635 he became the Deputy Crown Chancellor and Bishop of Przemyśl. From then, his influence and wealth grew, and in 1638 he became the Great Crown Chancellor.

He was a supporter of the Habsburgs, which earned him a nickname covert Spaniard, and an opponent of the pro-French faction. He advocated tightening Polish control over the Commonwealth vassal, Prince-elector of the Duchy of Prussia. Fighting for power and influence with magnate Jerzy Ossoliński, he became an ally of Adam Kazanowski and opponent of queen Cecilia Renata. In 1642 he lost the political battle and retired from court politics to the see of the Bishop of Kraków, passing the chancery to Ossoliński. Since then, he focused mostly on religious matters, coming back into politics only in 1646 with his vocal and strong opposition of King Władysław's planned campaign against the Ottoman Empire, after which he was accused of being a traitor and exiled to the Holy Roman Empire.

He died in Racibórz on 14 July 1657. His body was brought back to Poland and buried inside the Wawel Cathedral in Kraków.

== Legacy ==
Viewed by the szlachta as prideful and greedy, he supported the position of the Commonwealth king over orders from distant Rome when disputes arose between those two powers. He disliked the Jesuits and often sent complaints about their actions, destabilising the fragile religious tolerance in the Commonwealth.
