= Duchess of Teschen =

== Duchess of Teschen ==
=== House of Piast, 1290–1653 ===
Picture	Name	Father	Birth	Marriage	Became Duchess	Ceased to be Duchess	Death	Spouse
According to some sources, Mieszko's wife died ca. 1303, but her name is unknown. The Obituary of the Church of St. Vincent in Wrocław showed the existence of a certain "Grzymisława, Duchess of Opole" (Grimizlaua ducissa Opuliensis) who was buried there around 13 September 1286. Her parentage is also unknown, but her name suggests a Russian origin, probably member of the Rurikids. Her title suggests that she maybe was the wife of Mieszko I or the first wife of Bolko I (Mieszko I's brother), or maybe a different person.								Mieszko I
	Euphemia of Masovia (Note: Also Duchess consort of Siewierz.) (Note: Also Duchess consort of Bytom.)	Trojden I of Masovia (Piasts)	1310	1321/24		by 29 September 1358 husband's death	after 11 January 1374	Casimir I
	Elisabeth of Bytom	Bolesław of Bytom (Piasts)	1347/50	1360/63		1374		Przemyslaus I Noszak
	Euphemia of Masovia (Note: Also Duchess consort of Głogów.) (Note: Also Duchess consort of Ścinawa.)	Siemowit IV, Duke of Masovia (Piasts)	1395/98	20 November 1412		before 17 September 1447		Boleslaus I
	Elisabeth of Brandenburg	Frederick I, Elector of Brandenburg (Hohenzollern)	1 May/29 September 1403	17 February 1439		31 October 1449		Wenceslaus I
	Anna of Masovia	Bolesław IV of Warsaw (Piasts)	1446/50	1460/68		11/18 March 1477 husband's death	by 14 September 1480	Przemyslaus II
	Johanna of Poděbrady	Wiktoryn of Poděbrady, Duke of Opava (Poděbrady)	1463	by 15 February 1480		24 July 1496		Casimir II
	Anna of Brandenburg-Ansbach	Frederick I, Margrave of Brandenburg-Ansbach (Hohenzollern)	5 May 1487	1 December 1518		17 November 1524 husband's death	7 February 1539	Wenceslaus II
	Maria of Pernštejn	Jan of Pernštejn	24 February 1524	8 February 1540		19 November 1566		Wenceslaus III Adam
	Sidonia Katharina of Saxe-Lauenburg	Francis I, Duke of Saxe-Lauenburg (Ascania)	-	25 November 1567		4 November 1579 husband's death	July 1594	Wenceslaus III Adam
	Elisabeth Kettler of Courland	Gotthard Kettler, Duke of Courland (Kettler)	-	17 September 1595		19 November 1601		Adam Wenceslaus

=== House of Habsburg, 1653–1722 ===
Picture	Name	Father	Birth	Marriage	Became Duchess	Ceased to be Duchess	Death	Spouse
	Eleanor Gonzaga	Charles II Gonzaga (Gonzaga)	18 November 1630	30 April 1651	9 July 1654 husband's accession	2 April 1657 husband's death	6 December 1686	Ferdinand I
	Margarita Teresa of Spain	Philip IV of Spain (Habsburg)	12 July 1651	12 December 1666		12 March 1673		Leopold I
	Claudia Felicitas of Austria	Ferdinand Charles, Archduke of Further Austria (Habsburg)	30 May 1653	15 October 1673		8 April 1676		Leopold I
	Eleonor Magdalene of the Palatinate-Neuburg	Philipp Wilhelm, Elector Palatine (Wittelsbach)	6 January 1655	14 December 1676		5 May 1705 husband's death	19 January 1720	Leopold I
	Wilhelmina Amalia of Brunswick	John Frederick, Duke of Brunswick-Wolfenbüttel (Welf)	21 April 1673	24 February 1699	5 May 1705 husband's ascension	17 April 1711 husband's death	10 April 1742	Joseph I
	Elisabeth Christine of Brunswick-Wolfenbüttel	Louis Rudolph, Duke of Brunswick-Wolfenbüttel (Welf)	28 August 1691	1 August 1708	17 April 1711 husband's ascension	1722; Passed to Lorraine	21 December 1750	Charles I

=== House of Lorraine, 1722–1765 ===
Picture	Name	Father	Birth	Marriage	Became Duchess	Ceased to be Duchess	Death	Spouse
	Élisabeth Charlotte d'Orléans	Philippe I, Duke of Orléans (Orléans)	13 September 1676	13 October 1698	1722 husband's accession	27 March 1729 husband's death	23 December 1744	Leopold I
	Maria Theresa of Austria	Charles VII, Holy Roman Emperor (Habsburg)	13 May 1717	12 February 1736		18 August 1765 husband's death	29 November 1780	Francis I

=== House of Habsburg-Lorraine, 1765–1918 ===
Picture	Name	Father	Birth	Marriage	Became Duchess	Ceased to be Duchess	Death	Spouse
	Maria Josepha of Bavaria	Charles VII, Holy Roman Emperor (Wittelsbach)	30 March 1739	23 January 1765	18 August 1765 husband's accession	7/8 April 1766; Title passed to sister-in-law	28 May 1767	Joseph II
	Archduchess Maria Christina of Austria, Suo jure	Francis I, Holy Roman Emperor (Habsburg-Lorraine)	13 May 1742	7/8 April 1766		24 June 1798		Albert I
	Princess Henrietta of Nassau-Weilburg	Frederick William, Prince of Nassau-Weilburg (Nassau-Weilburg)	30 October 1797	15/17 September 1815	10 February 1822 husband's accession	29 December 1829		Charles II
	Princess Hildegard of Bavaria	Louis I of Bavaria (Wittelsbach)	10 June 1825	1 May 1844	30 April 1847 husband's accession	2 April 1864		Albert II
	Princess Isabella of Croÿ	Rudolf, Duke of Croÿ (Croÿ)	27 February 1856	8 October 1878	18 February 1895 husband's accession	1918; Monarchy abolished	5 September 1931	Frederick

== See also ==
- List of Polish consorts
- List of Austrian consorts
- Holy Roman Empress
- List of Hungarian consorts
- List of Bohemian consorts
- List of Lotharingian consorts
- List of Tuscan consorts
