= Frederick of Cieszyn =

Polish prince (died 1507)

Frederick
- Provost of the Kolegiata of the Holy Cross; Dean of the Chapter in Wrocław.
- Coat-of-arms of Upper Silesia (Cieszyn, etc).
- Born: 1480/83
- Died: June 1507
- Noble family: Silesian Piasts
- Father: Casimir II, Duke of Cieszyn
- Mother: Johanna of Münsterberg

Frederick of Cieszyn (Polish: Fryderyk cieszyński; b. 1480/83 - d. June 1507), was a Polish prince member of the House of Piast in the Cieszyn branch.

He was the eldest son of Casimir II, Duke of Cieszyn, by his wife Johanna of Poděbrady, daughter of Victor, Duke of Münsterberg, Duke of Opawa.

== Life ==
Despite the fact that he was the firstborn child of Duke Casimir II, and for unknown reasons, Frederick was destined for a Church career, which was probably in order to increase Casimir II's prestige and power over Silesia. In 1501, supported by his father and other Silesian Dukes, Frederick was a candidate to the office of Auxiliary Bishop of Wrocław, with the right of succession as titular Bishop after the death of the current holder of the Bishopric, Jan IV Roth. However, Frederick's nomination was rejected by the Chapter, mainly because Casimir II's unfavorable politics against the Church during his rule as Starost General of Silesia. Despite the initial protest of Casimir II the Chapter didn't change his opinion, and in 1503 he decided sent his son to Vienna, where shortly after Frederick was named Rector of the local University. Then he went to Italy, where Frederick began his studies. Despite the rejection of his candidacy in 1501 Frederick continue with his efforts to obtain the highest spiritual authority in Silesia and in 1506, with the help of his father, he was appointed Provost of the Kolegiata of the Holy Cross and Dean of the Chapter in Wrocław. Frederick's promising career was brutally interrupted in June 1507, when he died unexpectedly in Italy. He was buried in the Cathedral of Siena.

== Ancestry ==
Ancestors of Frederick of Cieszyn

16. Przemyslaus I Noszak, Duke of Cieszyn
8. Bolesław I, Duke of Cieszyn
17. Elisabeth of Koźle-Bytom
4. Bolesław II, Duke of Cieszyn
18. Siemowit IV, Duke of Masovia
9. Euphemia of Masovia
19. Alexandra of Lithuania
2. Casimir II, Duke of Cieszyn
20. Vladimir Olgerdovich
10. Ivan Vladimirovich, Prince of Bielsk
5. Anna of Bielsk
22. Andrew of Halshany
11. Vasilisa of Halshany
23. Alexandra of Drutsk
1. Frederick of Cieszyn
24. Victor of Kunštát and Poděbrady
12. George of Poděbrady, king of Bohemia
25. Anna of Wartenberg
6. Victor of Poděbrady, Duke of Münsterberg
26. Smil of Sternberg
13. Kunigunde of Sternberg
27. Barbara of Pardubice
3. Johanna of Poděbrady
28. Jan Ptáček of Pirkstein
14. Hynek Ptáček of Pirkstein
29. Jitka of Kunštát
7. Margaret Ptáčková
30. Ulrich V of Neuhaus
15. Anna of Neuhaus
31. Markéta of Kravař
