= Bolesław of Cieszyn =

Bolesław of Cieszyn may refer to:

- Bolesław of Cieszyn (died 1356), Polish prince
- Bolesław I, Duke of Cieszyn (c. 1363–1431)
- Bolesław II, Duke of Cieszyn (c. 1425/28–1452)
