= Bolko I =

Bolko I can refer to:

- Bolko I the Strict (died 1301), Silesian duke
- Bolko I of Opole (died 1313), Silesian duke

== See also ==
- Boleslaus I (disambiguation)
