= Guardian Angels' Chapel =

- Kaplica Aniołów Stróżów
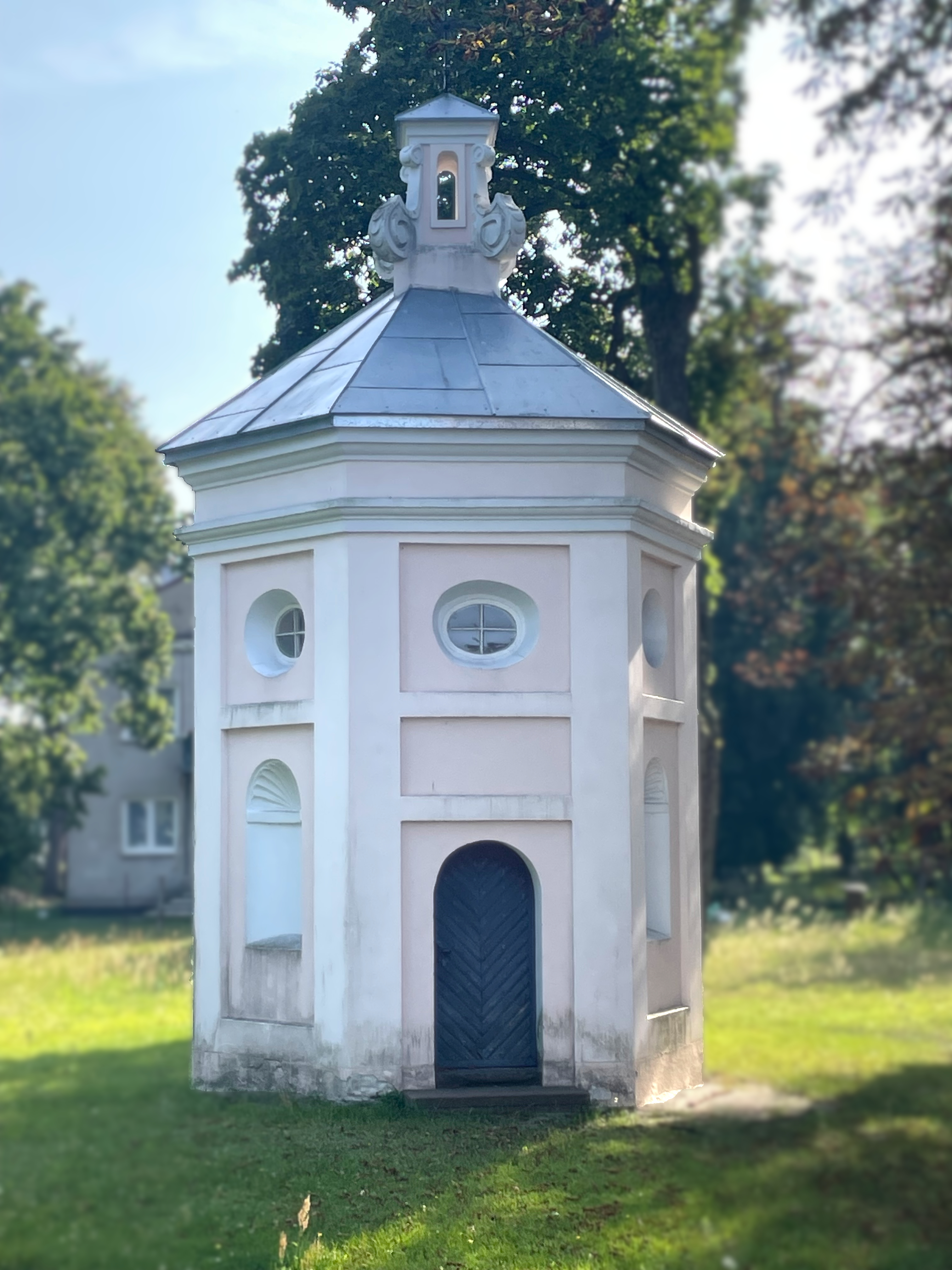

General information
- Town or city: Radzyń Podlaski
- Coordinates: 51.779375836347135°N 22.623988275349486°E

Guardian Angels' Chapel (Polish: Kaplica Aniołów Stróżów) is a historic religious site located in Radzyń Podlaski, Poland. The chapel was constructed in the 17th century on the grounds of a former wooden Church of the Holy Trinity. Over the centuries, the chapel has undergone significant changes, including desecration, periods of neglect, and various renovations. The structure, which features Baroque architectural elements and rich interior decorations, serves as an important cultural and historical monument. The chapel is also the venue for the annual "Days with Angels" (Polish: Dni z Aniołami) event, which take place there at the turn of September and October.

== History ==
The Guardian Angels' Chapel was constructed between 1614 and 1641 on the site of a former wooden Church of the Holy Trinity, founded by brothers Mikołaj and Wojciech Cebulka. In 1456, the original church was transferred to other believers and eventually taken over by Jan Kazanowski, a Protestant who was an opponent of the Roman Catholic Church. Kazanowski was buried there in 1591, an act that was perceived as a desecration of the site. At the beginning of the 17th century, the church was taken over by Zofia née Działyńska Mniszchów, the mayor of Łuków. However, by 1603, the church remained closed. This situation was documented by Bishop Samuel Maciejowski, who visited the parish and wrote about the original Church of the Holy Trinity: "Once a parish church, but for years desecrated by Mr. [Jan] Kazanowski, who was buried there." Due to its diminished status, the local authorities eventually demolished the original church and built the Guardian Angels' Chapel in its place.

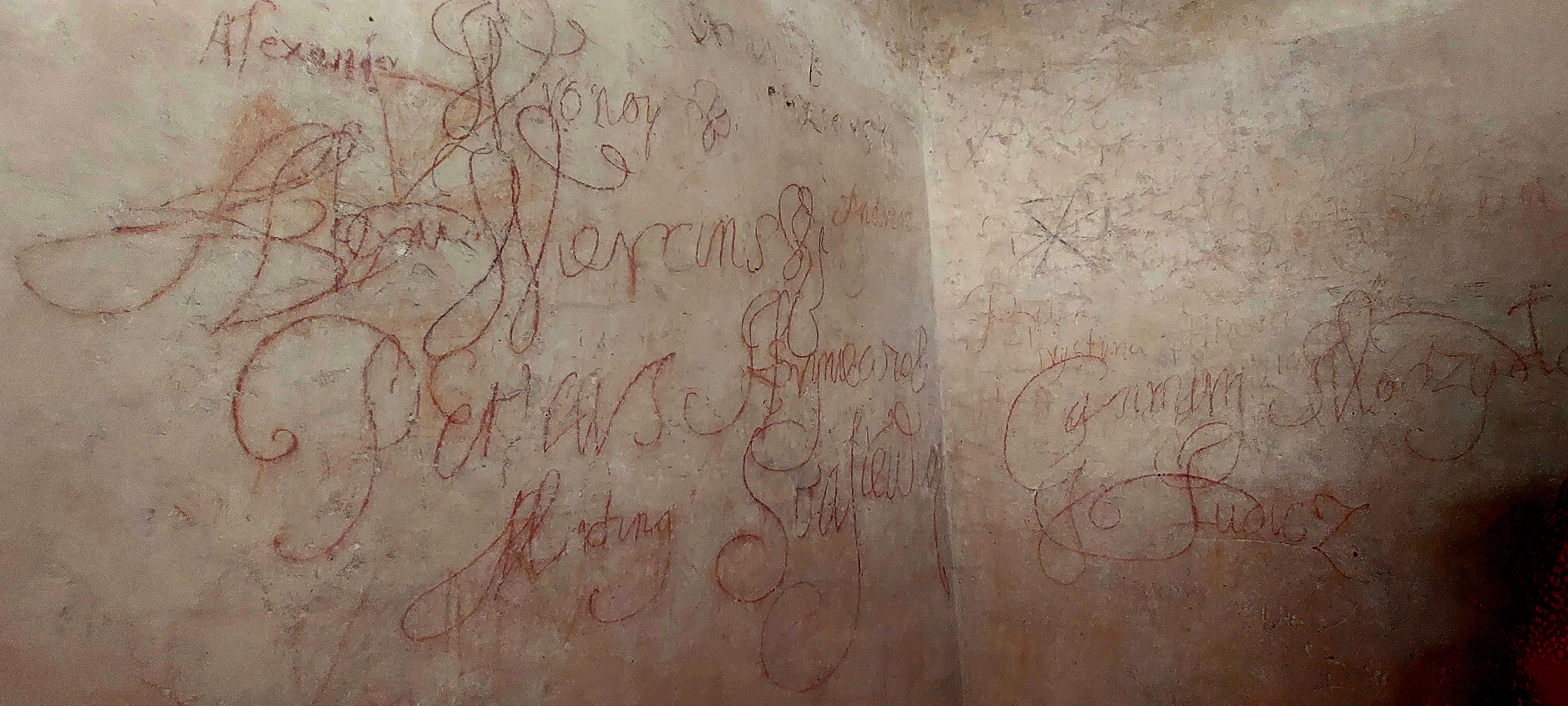
Inscriptions on the walls of the chapel

In the 1940s and 1950s, the chapel's function was repurposed by the hospital on Sitkowskiego Street to store human corpses, leading to a significant decline in its condition. A major renovation took place between 2009 and 2011, with costs estimated at 46,000 zloty, covering the replacement of woodwork, plastering, roofing, and painting.

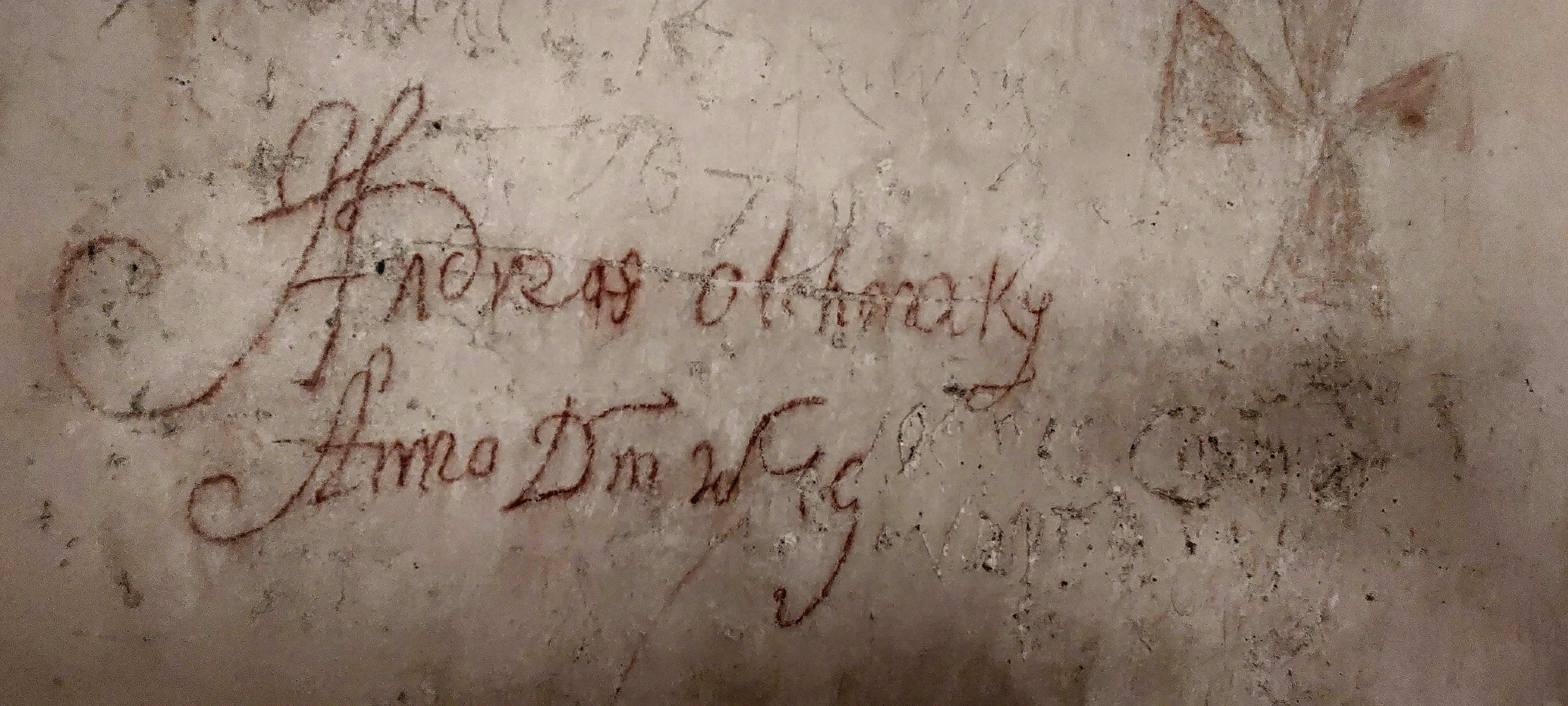
Inscriptions on the walls of the chapel

During the renovation, art conservators discovered inscriptions dating back as far as the 17th century, proving that the chapel was at least 100 years older than previously believed. These inscriptions are relatively legible, as they were made using lime paints or carved with sharp tools. Among the inscriptions are the names "Albertus Dzieżyc" and "Jaz Szczurowsky", with one of them dated 1698. The similarity of the decorations on the Mniszchów Tombstone in the Holy Trinity Church in Radzyń Podlaski suggests that the same architect may have been responsible for both buildings.

== Appearance ==
The chapel faces west and was constructed on a hexagonal plan using bricks. It comprises two floors. The side elevations are divided into frames and are capped with entablatures. The ornate wooden door is half-circular at the top and is approached by two concrete steps. Above the entrance, there is a rectangular panel and a square panel, the latter featuring an old niche with a window. On other walls, there is a conch shell design, which serves as the lower recess. In four instances, there are niches with symmetrical windows above them, except on the eastern wall, where there is a panel without an opening.

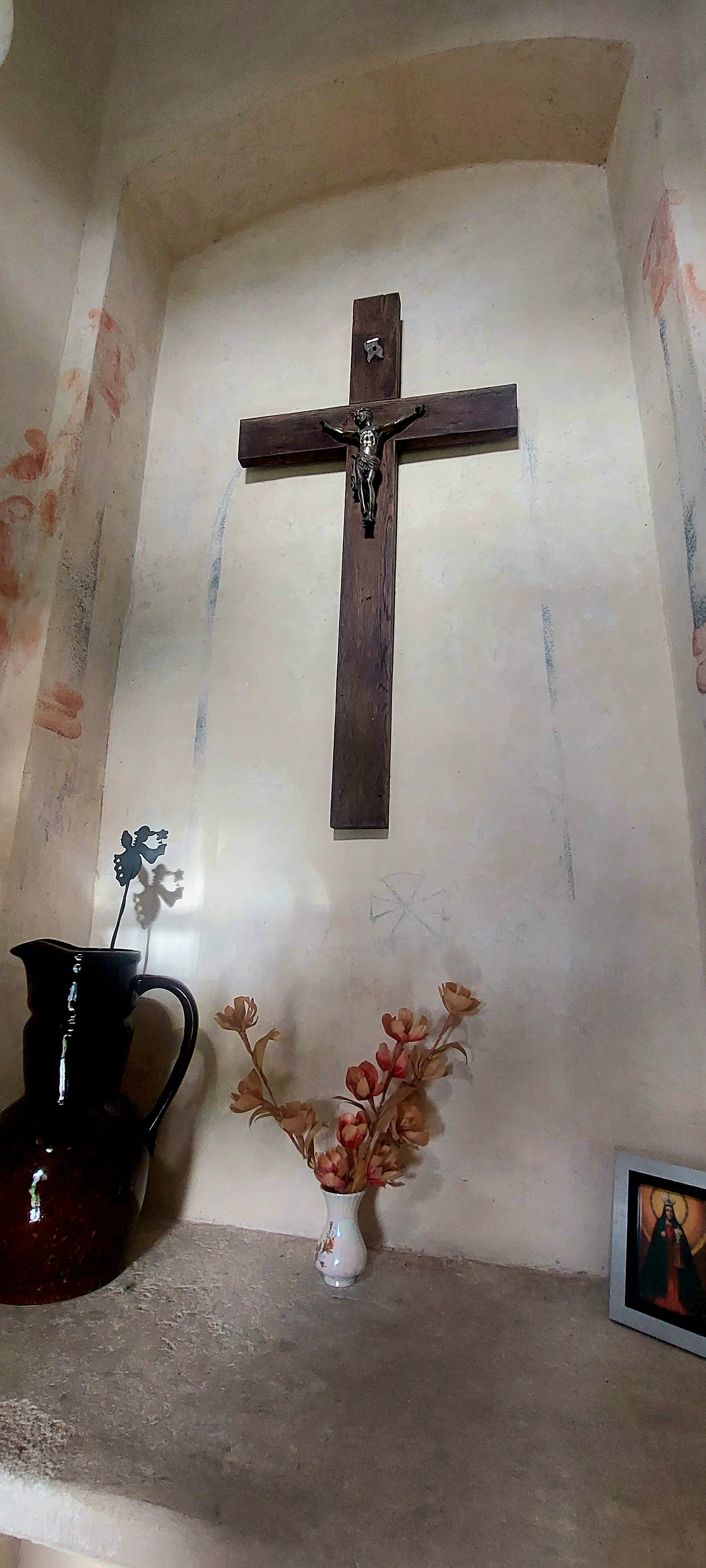
Altar in the Guardian Angels' Chapel

The chapel is covered by a pyramidal roof made of sheet metal. The roof is crowned with a Baroque lantern adorned with volutes—a decorative motif resembling a spiral or scroll. The lantern is pierced on four sides with rectangular openings that are semi-circular at the top. A blacksmith's cross is mounted on the top of the hipped roof.

The vault of the chapel is shaped like a decorated dome in the Lublin style. It features a framework of decorative ornaments, consisting of lighter astragal motifs (a string of pearls separated by vertical discs) and darker kimation motifs (a series of stylized plant motifs). Between these, twelve winged angel heads are visible. At the highest point of the vault, known as the keystone, there is a round rosette.

The interior of the chapel is a single space. On the eastern wall, there is a brick mense that serves as the altar top. Above this, a wooden cross is mounted.

== Days with Angels ==
Every year, around the turn of September and October, the Guardian Angels' Chapel becomes the focal point of a local celebration known as "Days with Angels", organized by Zofia Sękowska Special Educational and Care Center (Polish: Specjalny Ośrodek Szkolno-Wychowawczy im. Zofii Sękowskiej). This event includes a variety of activities such as lectures, artistic workshops, games, and competitions. During the celebration, a Holy Mass is held at the Guardian Angels' Chapel, which is located on the premises of the center. This Mass is attended by patients and employees of the Center. The event is also accompanied by a lecture on the history and monuments of Radzyń Podlaski.
