= Morgan Bible =

Medieval illuminated manuscript picture book Bible

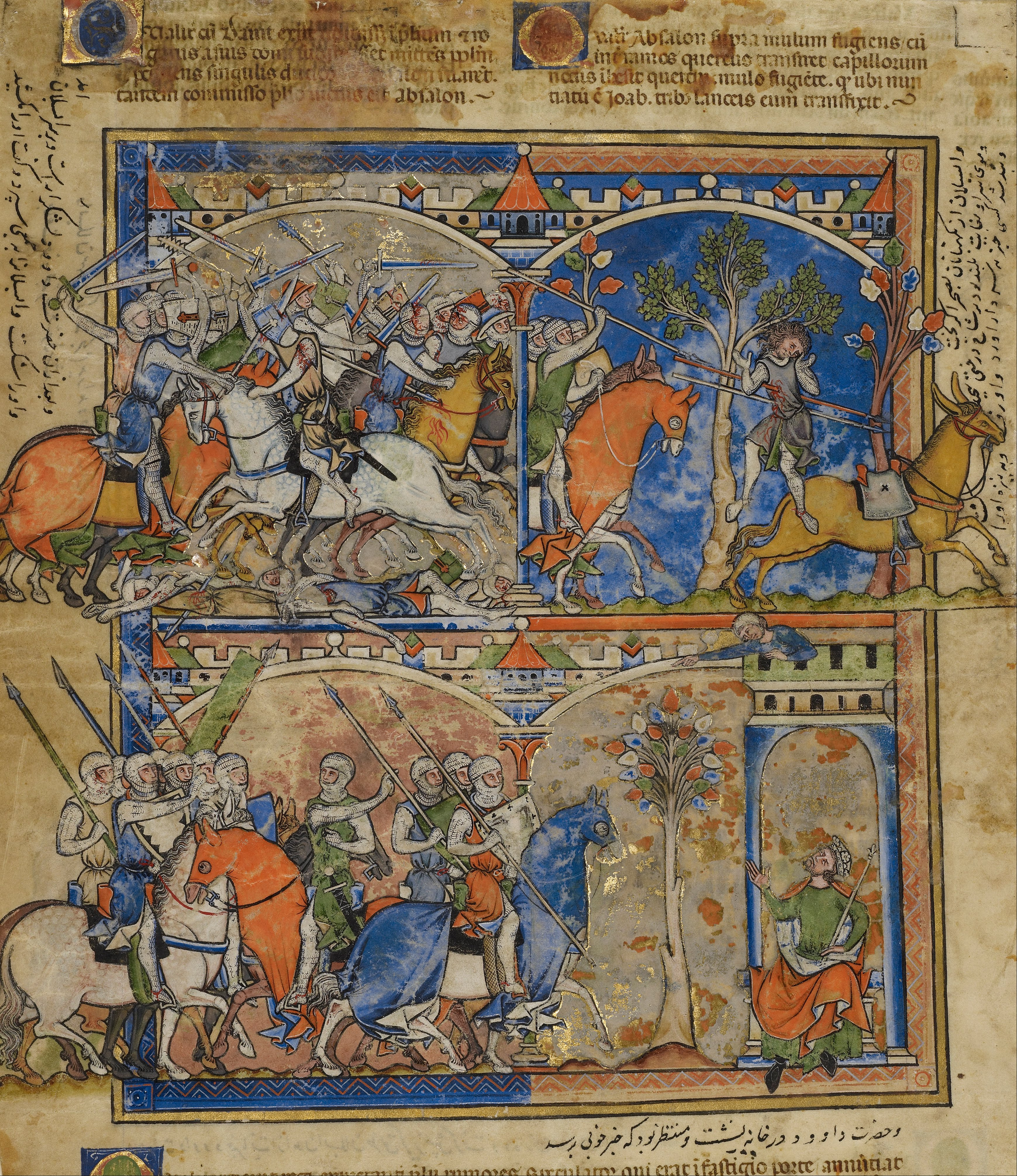
The end of the story of David and Absalom

The Morgan Bible (mostly Morgan Library & Museum, New York, Ms M. 638), also called the Morgan Picture Bible, Crusader Bible, Shah Abbas Bible or Maciejowski Bible, is a unique medieval illuminated manuscript. It is a picture book Bible of which 46 folios survive, with two thought to be missing. The book consists of miniature paintings of events from the Hebrew Bible depicted from a Christian perspective, set in the scenery and costumes of thirteenth-century France. It is not a complete Bible, as it consists largely of illustrations of stories of kings, especially King David. The illustrations are now surrounded by text in three scripts and five languages: Latin, Persian, Arabic, Judeo-Persian, and Hebrew. The level of detail in the images and the remarkable state of preservation of the work make it particularly valuable to scholars.

Forty-three folios are in the Morgan Library & Museum in New York City, US, with two folios in the Bibliothèque nationale de France (MS nouv. acq. lat. 2294). A single folio is in the J. Paul Getty Museum, Los Angeles, US (MS 16).

== Description ==
The majority of the Morgan Bible is part of the Morgan Library & Museum's collection in New York (Ms M. 638). It is a medieval picture Bible, originally containing 48 folios; of these, 43 still reside in the Morgan Museum, two are in the Bibliothèque nationale de France, Paris, one is in the J. Paul Getty Museum, Los Angeles, and two have been lost. The cover that once bound the manuscript has also been lost over time. The surviving leaves measure at 32.5 × 29.1 cm (12 13/16 × 11 7/16 in.) In full, the manuscript contained over 380 scenes. It was the work of at least six different artists. The book consists of paintings of events from Hebrew scripture but are given a setting in the customs and costumes of thirteenth-century France, concentrating on stories of kings, especially David.

The Morgan Bible is not a complete Bible. It includes portions of "Genesis, Exodus, Joshua, Judges, Ruth, and Samuel" with a particular emphasis on early Israelite heroes who are presented as models of kingship to learn from.

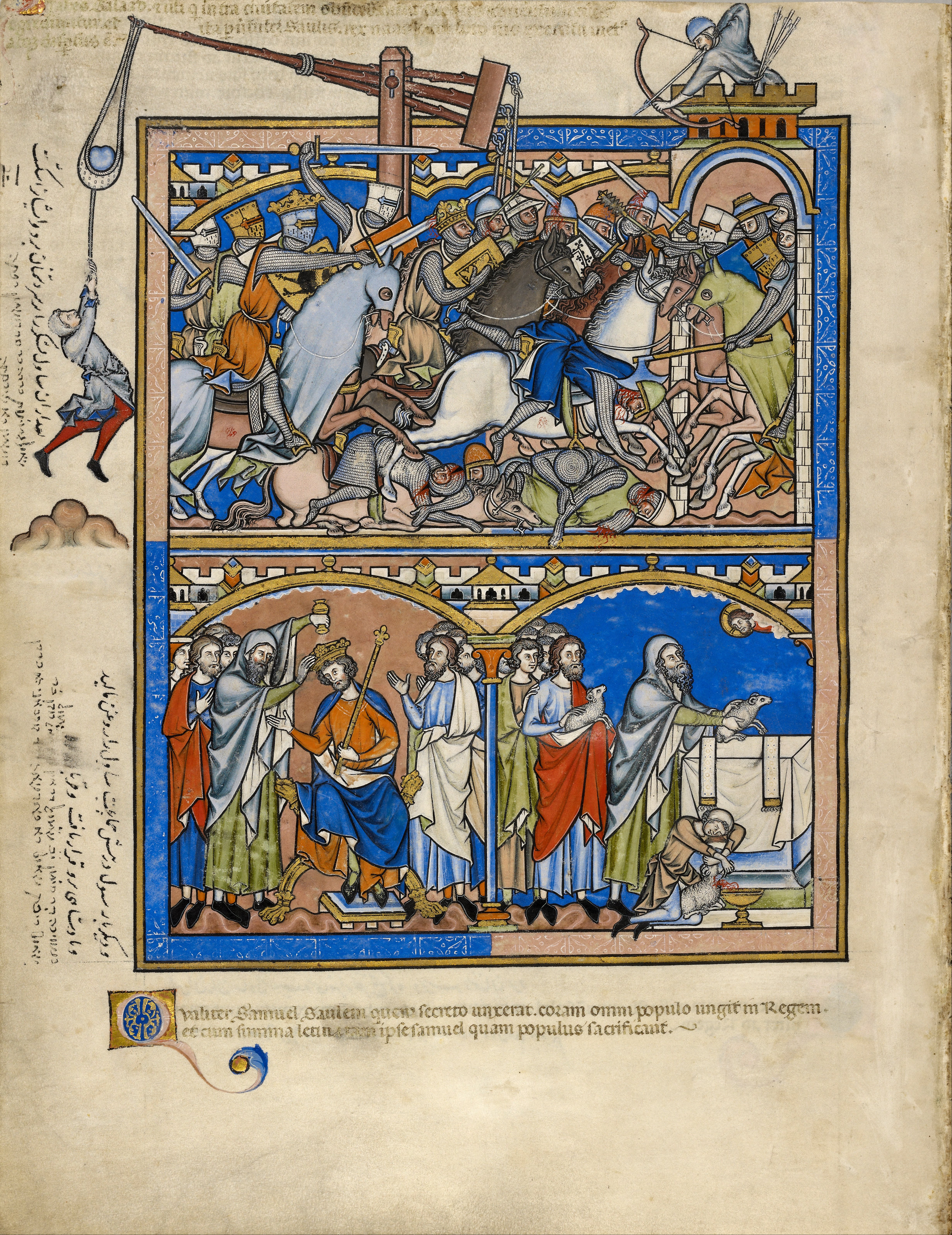
A Siege, Samuel crowns Saul king, and they sacrifice together.

Originally, the Bible contained only miniatures, organized in a consistent visual rhythm from page to page. Within 100 years, the book acquired marginal inscriptions in Latin describing the scenes illustrated. Cardinal Bernard Maciejowski, Bishop of Kraków, had the book given as a gift to Shah of Safavid Iran, Abbas The Great in 1608. Abbas ordered inscriptions in Persian to be added, mostly translating the Latin ones already there. Later, in the eighteenth century, inscriptions were added in Judeo-Persian. The Latin text allowed art historians to identify the subjects of the miniatures.

The manuscript is of particular interest to scholars because of the quality and preservation of the illuminations. The level of detail included, from architecture to siege engines to haircuts, provides historians with valuable clues as to what life was like at the time, while the stylistic changes and subtle variations in the story-lines give some insight into one of the most powerful men in Europe.

== Provenance ==
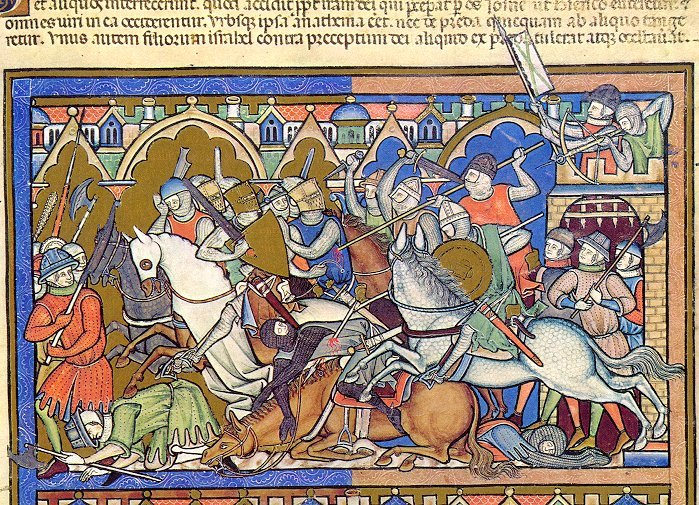
"The Israelites are repulsed from Ai" (fol. 10r)

The book has traditionally been thought to have been created in Paris in the mid-1240s for Louis IX of France. A suggestion by Allison Stones, expanding on conclusions by others such as François Avril, that it was instead illuminated in northern France around 1250 has not won general acceptance.

The modern imagery may have been a political statement because the Franks, especially during the reign of Louis IX, saw themselves as the legitimate heirs of Rome. Under Louis IX, France took a militant position against the enemies of Christendom, taking an active part in the Seventh and Eighth Crusades. The creation of the Morgan Bible falls around the time Louis IX went on his first crusade, and the style of using modern clothes on biblical figures appears in other works he commissioned around this time such as the Sainte-Chapelle chapel in Paris, whose stained glass is in the same style, suggesting they may have been used to legitimize his position at home and among the other crusaders.

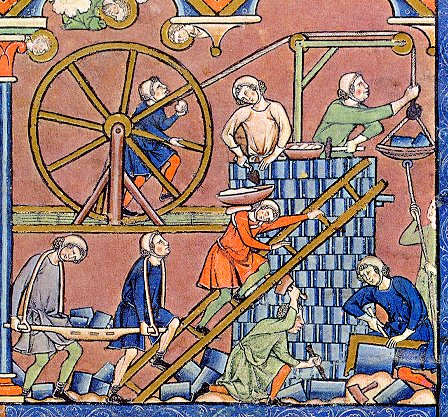
Depiction of a 13th century construction site

After the death of Louis IX, ownership passed to his brother, Charles of Anjou who defeated Naples in 1266 and founded the Angevin Dynasty. While the book was in Italy, Latin text was added.

Ownership up to this point has been based mostly on guesswork and circumstantial evidence. The first recorded owner of the Bible was Cardinal Bernard Maciejowski, who was the Bishop of Cracow, Poland. Maciejowski studied for the priesthood in Italy and likely gained ownership of the manuscript while there.

In 1604, Cardinal Maciejowski gifted the Bible to Abbas the Great, through a delegation, as is evidenced by the inscription of folio 1 that reads in Latin (translated by Daniel Weiss): “Bernard Maciejowski, Cardinal Priest of the Holy Roman Church, Bishop of Cracow, Duke of Siewierz, and Senator of the Kingdom of Poland with sincere wishes offers this gift to the supreme King of the Persians at Cracow the mother city of the kingdom of Poland on the seventh of September 1604.” It officially reached the Shah back in Isfahan in 1608. Abbas seemed to enjoy the gift and after having missionaries explain the pictures, he had Persian inscriptions added and added his own seal of ownership on folio 42v.

=== Lost leaves ===
It appears that at some point several pages were deliberately removed from the book. It has been suggested that Abbas the Great tore out these pages, all involving Absalom's rebellion, because he thought they might be a bad influence on his young son; however, others suggest that he may have removed them in 1615, as they may have provided a painful reminder of how he executed his son that year for treason.

When the Afghans conquered Isfahan in 1722, the royal library was sacked along with the rest of the city. Little is known of the manuscript's whereabouts in the succeeding years, except that a Persian Jew added Judeo-Persian inscriptions to the manuscript, and even commented on and corrected the previous scripts.

The manuscript was not heard of again until 1833, when it was sold at auction by Sotheby's, whose records indicate that they purchased it in Cairo. It was purchased by London dealers Payne and Foss, who subsequently sold it to manuscript collector Sir Thomas Phillipps. When Phillipps died, his collection of around 60,000 manuscripts was inherited by his daughter, and then his grandson, who eventually began selling it off in order to pay off debts. Sotheby's sold the book at auction to J. P. Morgan in 1910 for £10,000.
