= Przemysław II, Duke of Cieszyn =

Przemyslaus II
- Duke of Cieszyn
- Born: c. 1420
- Died: 18 March 1477
- Noble family: Silesian Piasts
- Spouse: Anna of Warsaw
- Issue: Hedwig of Cieszyn
- Father: Boleslaus I, Duke of Cieszyn
- Mother: Euphemia of Masovia

Przemyslaus II of Cieszyn, also known as Primislaus II of Teschen or Przemko II (Polish: Przemysław, Czech: Přemysl, German: Przemislaus; 1422/25 – 18 March 1477), was a Duke of Cieszyn (Teschen, Těšín) from 1431, ruler over Bielsko and Skoczów (from 1442), Duke of half of both Duchy of Głogów (Glogau, Hlohov) and Duchy of Ścinawa from 1460 and from 1468 sole ruler over Cieszyn.

He was the third son of Duke Boleslaus I of Cieszyn by his second wife, Euphemia, daughter of Duke Siemowit IV of Masovia.

== Life ==
After the death of his father in 1431, Przemysław II ruled over all the Duchy together with his brothers as co-rulers, but under the tutelage of their mother. On 29 November 1442 the formal division of the Duchy took place between Bolesław I's sons: Przemysław II took over Cieszyn (but only nominally, because the power was taken by his older brother Wenceslaus I), Bielsko (with his brother Bolesław II) and Skoczów (alone).

Przemysław II sought to actively interfere in political affairs. In 1443 he expressed his consent to the sale of the Duchy of Siewierz to Zbigniew Oleśnicki, Bishop of Kraków, in return for which he received from Wenceslaus I the amount of 500 pieces of silver. In 1447, together with his brother Bolesław II, he participated in the Congress of Kraków, where he supported Poland in a dispute about Siewierz.

In 1447, the death of his mother Euphemia finally enabled Przemysław II and his brother Bolesław II to move to their domains in Skoczów and Fryštát.

Bolesław II died in 1452, leaving one son, Casimir II. Przemysław II took over the guardianship of his orphaned nephew.

Przemysław II supported his suzerain, the Bohemian king George of Podebrady and also maintained close ties with the Polish king Casimir IV Jagiellon, which was demonstrated, for example, in 1454, when Przemysław II received in Cieszyn Princess Elisabeth of Austria, on her way to Kraków for her wedding to King Casimir IV. However, the good relations with Poland deteriorated after the dispute between Poland and Duke John IV of Oświęcim, which finally ended after a further agreement on 1 July 1457 in Kraków.

Three years later, Przemysław II was present at a meeting between the Kings of Poland and Bohemia in Bytom, where he served as conciliator. The next mediation took place on 9 June 1461 between John IV of Oświęcim and the King of Poland.

In 1460 Władysław, another of Przemysław II's brothers, died without issue. In his will, he left his domains – half of both Głogów and Ścinawa – to his widow Margareta of Celje (as her bequest, dower) and Przemysław II, who actually took effective power over all the lands.

Przemysław II tried to get closer to Bohemian and Polish rulers and in 1462 in Głogów both kings met and negotiated the future of the Bohemian Kingdom. As a reward for his services, he received the town of Valašské Meziříčí in eastern Moravia, only during his lifetime.

In 1466 the prince took an active part in the expedition of George of Podebrady to Kłodzko (Kladsko), causing tension between Cieszyn and the powerful Wrocław (Breslau).

After the abdication of his brother Wenceslaus I in 1468, Przemysław II could take power over Cieszyn, although the former duke in fact renounced on behalf of his nephew Casimir II.

In 1469 he took part in the election of Hungarian king Matthias Corvinus as (anti)King of Bohemia in Olomouc (Olmütz), mainly thanks to the efforts of Pope Paul II and insurgent Bohemian Catholic nobility. For some time, Przemysław II went to Hungary and Bohemia, and even took part in the war against Corvinus' enemies in the Upper Silesia. It appeared, however, that Matthias Corvinus didn't recompense Przemysław II for his support, but also tried depriving him of Cieszyn. In this situation, in 1471 Przemysław II joined the opposition against the King, supporting the Bohemian candidacy of Prince Vladislaus II Jagiellon, son of Casimir IV.

Trying to shift between Poland, Bohemia and Hungary, in 1473 Przemysław II supported Matthias Corvinus in his war against Duke Wenceslaus III of Rybnik. However, the common victory didn't improve his relations with the Hungarian monarch. In 1474 Wenceslaus I, the last surviving brother of Przemysław II, died without issue, allowing him to unify all their domains under his rule (except Siewierz and Bytom, which were already sold). Przemysław II's growing importance, however, didn't please Bohemian-Hungarian king Matthias Corvinus, who, during the meeting of Racibórz in 1475, obtained from Casimir IV of Poland the guarantee that he could interfere without difficulties in the sovereignty over the Duchy of Teschen, threatening to completely deprive Przemysław II if he didn't pay a huge contribution. The Duke was saved from a final fall against the Hungarian-Polish army expedition, thanks to Jakub z Dębna, who supported the defense of Cieszyn. Przemyslaw II, however, had to agree to the seizure of half of both Głogów and Ścinawa in 1476 by King Matthias.

After, Przemysław II retained only the main town of Cieszyn and a few cities. He died soon afterwards, on 18 March 1477 and was buried in the Dominican church in Cieszyn. Without male issue, on his death he was succeeded by his nephew Casimir II, the only male member of the Cieszyn branch.

== Marriage and issue ==
Around 1465, Przemysław II married Anna (b. 1450-1453 – d. by 14 September 1480), daughter of Duke Bolesław IV of Warsaw. They had one daughter:

- Hedwig of Cieszyn (1469 – 6 April 1521); married on 11 August 1483 to Stephen Zápolya, Lord of Trenčín. From this marriage were born four children, two sons and two daughters. The oldest son was János Zápolya, later King of Hungary, and the oldest of the daughters, Barbara Zápolya, was the first wife of Sigismund I the Old, King of Poland.

== Ancestry ==
Ancestors of Przemysław II, Duke of Cieszyn

16. Mieszko I, Duke of Cieszyn
8. Casimir I, Duke of Cieszyn
17. Grzymisława
4. Przemyslaus I Noszak, Duke of Cieszyn
18. Trojden I, Duke of Masovia
9. Euphemia of Czersk-Warsaw
19. Maria of Galicia
2. Bolesław I, Duke of Cieszyn
20. Władysław of Bytom
10. Bolesław of Bytom
21. Ludgarda of Mecklenburg
5. Elisabeth of Koźle-Bytom
22. Jaroslav of Sternberg
11. Margareta of Sternberg
23. Margareta of Bílina
1. Przemysław II of Cieszyn
24. Trojden I, Duke of Masovia (= 18)
12. Siemowit III, Duke of Masovia
25. Maria of Galicia (= 19)
6. Siemowit IV, Duke of Masovia
26. Nicholas II, Duke of Opava
13. Euphemia of Opava
27. Anna of Racibórz
3. Euphemia of Masovia
28. Gediminas, Grand Duke of Lithuania
14. Algirdas, Grand Duke of Lithuania
29. Jewna
7. Alexandra of Lithuania
30. Aleksandr Mikhailovich of Tver
15. Uliana of Tver
31. Anastasia of Halych

== Notes ==
Przemysław II, Duke of Cieszyn House of Piast Born: c. 1420 Died: 18 March 1477
Regnal titles
Preceded by Bolesław I	Duke of Cieszyn with Wenceslaus I, Władysław and Bolesław II; 1431–1442	Succeeded by Wenceslaus I
Preceded by Bolesław I	Duke of Bytom (1/2) with Wenceslaus I, Władysław and Bolesław II; 1431–1442	Succeeded by Wenceslaus I
Preceded by Bolesław I	Duke of Siewierz with Wenceslaus I, Władysław and Bolesław II; 1431–1442	Succeeded by Wenceslaus I
Preceded by Bolesław I	Duke of Głogów (1/2) with Wenceslaus I, Władysław and Bolesław II; 1431–1442	Succeeded by Władysław
Preceded by Bolesław I	Duke of Ścinawa (1/2) with Wenceslaus I, Władysław and Bolesław II; 1431–1442	Succeeded by Władysław
Preceded by Władysław	Duke of Głogów (1/2) with Margareta of Celje; 1460–1476	Succeeded by Annexed by the Kingdom of Bohemia; Jan II the Mad obtained Głogów in 1480
Preceded by Władysław	Duke of Ścinawa (1/2) with Margareta of Celje; 1460–1476	Succeeded by Annexed by the Kingdom of Bohemia; Jan II the Mad obtained Głogów in 1480
Preceded by Wenceslaus I	Duke of Cieszyn; 1468–1477	Succeeded by Casimir II
