= Bernard Maciejowski =

Polish nobleman, starosta, royal standard bearer, statesman and Catholic Church leader

His Eminence Bernard Maciejowski
- Cardinal, Primate of Poland
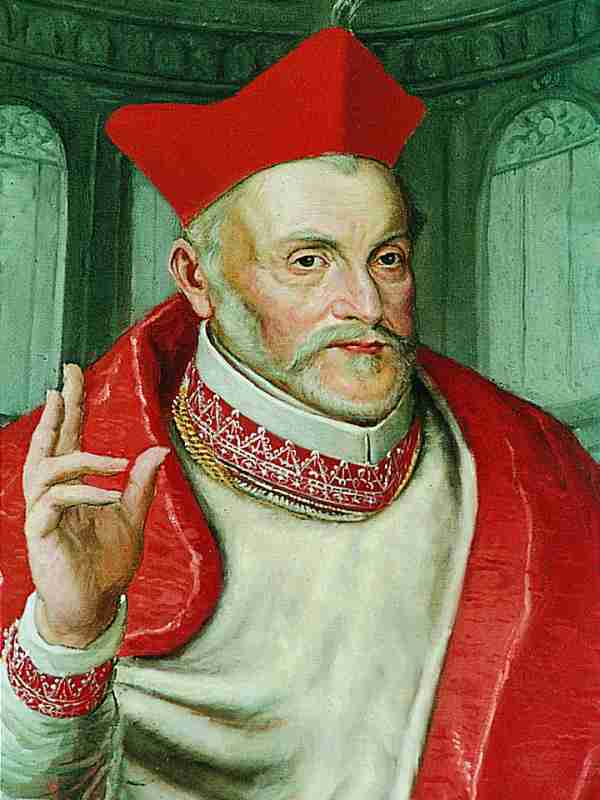
- Archdiocese: Gniezno
- See: Archdiocese of Gniezno
- Installed: 1606
- Term ended: 1608

Orders
- Ordination: 1586
- Consecration: 24 January 1588
- Created cardinal: 9 June 1604
- Rank: Cardinal-Priest

Personal details
- Born: 1548
- Died: 19 January 1608 (aged 59–60)
- Denomination: Roman Catholic
- Coat of arms

Cardinal Bernard Maciejowski, Ciołek coat of arms (1548 – 19 January 1608 in Kraków), Polish nobleman, starosta, royal standard bearer, statesman and Catholic Church leader; Lutsk bishop, Archbishop of Kraków, Archbishop of Gniezno and Primate of Poland (between 1606 and 1608).

== Biography ==
Maciejowski was a scion (descendant) of powerful family, being a son of Bernard Maciejowski, starosta of Trembowla (now Terebovlia), castelan of Lublin and Radom, and his wife Elżbieta Kamieniecka, Piława coat of arms. His uncle, Samuel Maciejowski, was the archbishop of Kraków. He studied at the Jesuit College in Vienna. Since 1570 he became vexillifer regni (royal standard-bearer) of king Sigismund II Augustus. He participated as a soldier during 1579–1581 in the Livonian campaign of Stephen Báthory during the Stephen Bathory's reign over the Polish–Lithuanian Commonwealth. Under the influence of the Polish influential Jesuit Piotr Skarga Maciejowski decided to study theology in Rome, which he started in 1582. There, in 1586 he took Holy Orders and became a presbyter, and later on the same year he became a canon in Poland's capital, Kraków. Upon King Stephen's death he supported Sigismund III Vasa's election. Then he was sent by the new king to Rome as his diplomatic envoy to the pope. He was then rewarded by the new king with a seat of bishop of the diocese of Łuck in 1588. In his function of Bishop of Lutsk he founded and had built a Jesuit college in Lublin in 1591–1596. He was part of the preparations leading to the Union of Brest. In the late 16th century, following the death of Jerzy Radziwiłł, he was considered to become the Bishop of Vilnius, however the Lithuanian nobility strictly opposed this, thus he was never confirmed as such by the Chapter of Vilnius Cathedral and never resided in Vilnius.

In 1600 he was again promoted as he became a bishop of Kraków, his ingressus (official entry) into the Wawel Cathedral took place on 12 August 1600.

Bishop Bernard called a council of church (synod) in his diocese in 1601, and upon its conclusion published a pastoral epistle addressed to the Parsons of his diocese, and this publication is considered today as the first Christian ministry textbook. His then famous and important pastoral epistle had come to be distributed and publicized in the whole country in 1607. In 1603 Pope Clement VIII nominated Maciejowski to a position of cardinal. In 1606 he became the archbishop of Gniezno, the most important Church position in the country, also one of the most important positions in the functioning of the state, as during the Polish interregnum the archbishop of Gniezno was also an Interrex. Maciejowski started reforming the Polish Church in the spirit and teachings of the Council of Trident. In his capacity of the archbishop of Poland was a follower of the Counter-Reformation, and he endorsed and sought to venerate Jadwiga of Poland and her black Crucifix located at the Wawel Cathedral. Since 1603 he had promoted the veneration of John Cantius, future saint. He was involved in the Jan Latosz controversy and professor's removal from the Jagiellonian University. During his tenure as the bishop of Kraków and archbishop of Poland, Maciejowski had many repairs and rebuilding projects carried under his wings, in Kraków and elsewhere. He was famous for his charity work and services. Maciejewski married the future tsar Dimitriy Ioannovich (False Dmitriy I) and future tsarina Maryna Mniszech (Marina Mniszech).

Maciejowski had the now famous Maciejowski Bible, and this book was attached along with other gifts of the Polish Crown royal diplomatic envoy by king Sigismund III Vasa to shah Abbas I of Persia. The inscription on the bottom of the first page on the manuscript says: Potentissimo Persarum Regi, Bernardus Macieuskius sacrae Romanae Ecclesiae Presbiter Cardinalis Episcopus Cracouiensis Dux Sebierinesis Regni Poloniae Senator veram felicitatem exoptans offert Cracoviae Regni Poloniae Metropoli Die spetima Septembris Anno Salutis Humanae Millesimo sexcentesimo quarto.

He was buried in the Wawel Cathedral, in a chapel bearing his own family name (Maciejowski Chapel), where his uncle, Bishop Samuel Maciejowski, also was buried. There is a surviving portrait of Maciejowski, located at the St. Francis of Assisi's Church, Kraków, the monastery that he ordered rebuilt. His contemporary chronicler Rajnold Hejdensztejn (Reinhold Heidenstein) in his work Rerum Polonicarum praised Maciejowski's literacy and learning.

== Bibliography ==
- Reinhold Heidenstein, Rerum Polonicarum ab excessu Sigismundi Augusti libri XII, Frankfurt a/Main 1672
- M. Gliszczyński (editor) "Dzieje Polski do śmierci Zygmunta Augusta do r. 1594, t. 1-2, Petersburg 1857,
- Kasper Niesiecki,Polish Armorial - "Korona Polska przy złotey wolnosci starożytnemi Rycerstwa Polskiego y Wielkiego Xięstwa Litewskiego kleynotami naywyższymi Honorami Heroicznym, Męstwem y odwagą, Wytworną Nauką a naypierwey Cnotą, nauką Pobożnością, y Swiątobliwością ozdobiona Potomnym zaś wiekom na zaszczyt y nieśmiertelną sławę Pamiętnych w tey Oyczyźnie Synow podana TOM ... Przez X. Kaspra Niesieckego Societatis Jesu", Lwów (now Lviv), 1738, vol 6, p 310–314.

Catholic Church titles
Preceded by Jerzy Radziwiłł	Bishop of Kraków; 1600–1605	Succeeded by Piotr Tylicki
Preceded by Jan Tarnowski	Primate of Poland; Archbishop of Gniezno; 1606–1608	Succeeded by Wojciech II Baranowski
