= Boleslaus I =

Boleslaus I (also Boleslav I, Boleslaw I, Bolesław I) may refer to:

- Boleslav I of Bohemia (or Boleslaus I of Bohemia, Boleslav the Cruel) (died in 967 or 972)
- Boleslaus I of Poland (Boleslaw the Brave, Bolesław Chrobry), (967–1025)
- Bolesław I the Tall (1127–1201)
- Boleslaus I, Duke of Cieszyn (ca. 1363 – 1431)
