= New Silesia =

Former Prussian province

Coordinates: 50°28′N 19°13′E

New Silesia Neuschlesien (de) Nowy Śląsk (pl)
- Province of Prussia
- 1795–1807
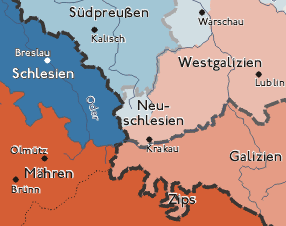
- New Silesia among the Polish territories annexed by Prussia in the Third Partition (light blue)
- Capital: Siewierz (Sewerien)
- History
  - 3rd Polish Partition: 24 October 1795
  - Treaties of Tilsit: 9 July 1807
Preceded by	Succeeded by
/ Duchy of Siewierz; Kraków Voivodeship / Kraków Voivodeship (14th century – 1795)	Duchy of Warsaw
- Today part of: Poland

New Silesia (German: Neuschlesien or Neu-Schlesien) was a small province of the Kingdom of Prussia from 1795 to 1807, created after the Third Partition of Poland. It was located northwest of Kraków and southeast of Częstochowa, in the lands that had been part of the Duchy of Siewierz and the adjacent Polish historical province of Lesser Poland (the Kraków Voivodeship), including the towns of Żarki, Pilica, Będzin, and Sławków.

New Silesia had its capital at Siewierz. However, it was originally to be governed by the Silesian capital Breslau (Wrocław) and later largely administered by South Prussia. After the defeat of Prussia in the War of the Fourth Coalition in 1806, the province was dissolved and the territory was made part of the Napoleonic Duchy of Warsaw in the Treaties of Tilsit of 1807.

== See also ==
- South Prussia
- New East Prussia
- Partitions of Poland
- Prussia
