= Margareta of Celje =

Slovenian noblewoman

- Duchess of half Głogów and half Ścinawa
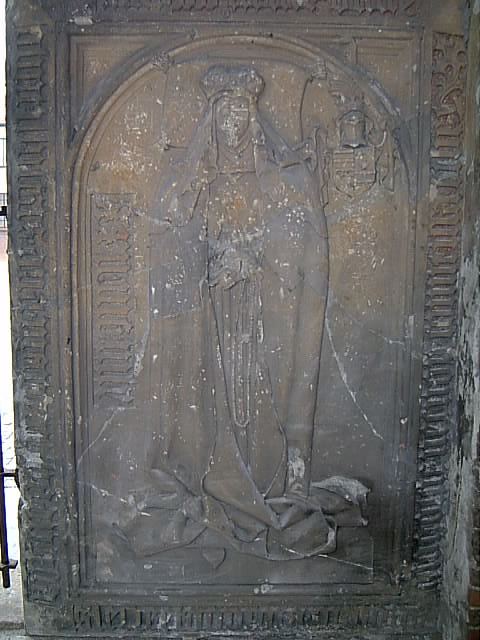
- Born: 1411
- Died: 22 July 1480 (aged 68–69)
- Noble family: Celje
- Spouses: Herman I, Count of Montfort-Pfannberg-Bregenz; Władysław of Głogów
- Issue: Herman II; George I Johann III; Barbara
- Father: Herman III, Count of Celje
- Mother: Elisabeth of Abensberg

Margaret of Celje (German: Margareta, Polish: Małgorzata; 1411 – 22 July 1480) was a noblewoman, who was a member of the Slovenian House of Celje and by marriage Duchess of both half Głogów and Ścinawa. Her husband willed his Duchies to her, making her Duchess regnant between 1460 and 1476.

== Life ==
She was the only child of Herman III, Count of Celje (b. 1380? - d. after falling from his horse, 30 July 1426), by his first wife, Elisabeth (b. 1377? - d. bef. 1423), daughter of Baron Johann II of Abensberg and widow of Ulrich II of Schauenburg. From her mother's first marriage, Margareta had two older half-brothers, Johann I (d. 16 November 1453) and George I of Schauenburg (d. young, 1404).

From her father's side, she was a niece of Barbara of Celje, second and last wife of Sigismund, Holy Roman Emperor, King of Hungary and Bohemia.

=== Marriages ===
On 15 March 1430 Margareta married firstly with Herman I, Count of Montfort-Pfannberg-Bregenz. They had four children, three sons — Herman II (born in 1431), George I (born in 1433) and Johann III (born in 1434) — and one daughter — Barbara (born in 1435). Count Hermann I died on 24 July 1435.

In December 1444 Margareta married secondly with Władysław, Duke of both half Głogów and Ścinawa, member of the Cieszyn branch of the House of Piast. They had no children.

=== Duchess regnant ===
Władysław died on 14 February 1460. In his will, he left all his domains to Margareta (as her dower) and his brother Przemysław II; however, soon Przemysław II took the effective government over all his late brother's domains.

Margareta, dispossessed from the rule over her lands, remained in Głogów, even after her brother-in-law Przemysław II lost the sovereignty over the half Głogów and Ścinawa in 1476, when King Matthias Corvinus annexed this lands to the Bohemian crown. Recognized her authority (although purely formal) over her dower, Margareta had to face the ambitions of Jan II the Mad, Duke of Żagań, who wanted to obtain the direct control over half Głogów and Ścinawa.

Casimir II, nephew of Władysław and Przemysław II, claimed his rights over half Głogów and Ścinawa as the only male heir of the whole Cieszyn branch. Soon, he was sworn by the Głogów city council ruler of the city as guardian of Margareta; however, he was defeated by Jan II's forces shortly after. At the end, Casimir II renounced to all his claims over Władysław's inheritance in exchange of a monetary compensation from King Matthias Corvinus in 1479.

Now Margareta was forced to defend the city alone from Jan II the Mad. She maintained the resistance in Głogów until 1 May 1480, when, after a siege of seven weeks, Jan II finally conquered the city, and the Duchy of Głogów was finally reunited after almost 150 years of separation. Margareta died two months later.

Regnal titles
Preceded by Władysław	Duke of Głogów (1/2) with Przemysław II; 1460–1476 (formally until 1480)	Succeeded by Annexed by the Kingdom of Bohemia; Jan II the Mad obtained Głogów in 1480
Preceded by Władysław	Duke of Ścinawa (1/2) with Przemysław II; 1460–1476 (formally until 1480)	Succeeded by Annexed by the Kingdom of Bohemia; Jan II the Mad obtained Głogów in 1480
