= Bolesław II, Duke of Cieszyn =

Polish noble

Bolesław II
- Duke of Cieszyn
- Coat-of-arms of Upper Silesia (Opole, Cieszyn, Bytom, etc).
- Born: c. 1425/28; Teschen
- Died: 4 October 1452
- Noble family: Silesian Piasts
- Spouse: Anna of Bielsk
- Issue: Casimir II, Duke of Cieszyn; Sophia; Barbara
- Father: Boleslaus I, Duke of Cieszyn
- Mother: Euphemia of Masovia

Bolesław II of Cieszyn (Polish: Bolesław II cieszyński, Czech: Boleslav II. (Těšín), German: Boleslaus II. (Teschen); c. 1425/28 – 4 October 1452), was a Duke of Cieszyn since 1431 (until 1442 with his brothers as co-rulers), ruler over half of Bielsko and Frysztat (from 1442), and during 1452 sole ruler over one half of Bytom.

He was the fourth and youngest son of Duke Bolesław I of Cieszyn by his second wife Euphemia, daughter of Duke Siemowit IV of Masovia.

== Life ==
After the death of his father in 1431, Bolesław II ruled over the duchy together with his brothers as co-rulers, but under the tutelage of their mother. After the division of the duchy on 29 November 1442, he still held the title of Duke of Cieszyn, but in practice ruled only over 16 towns and villages in Cieszyn; the most important of them was Frysztat, which was obtained by Bolesław II only after his mother's death in 1447 and shortly after, received broader city rights by Bolesław II. He left most of the control over the duchy to his brother Przemyslaus II.

Just like his brothers and father, also Bolesław II tried to be active in the international politics. Unlike his brother Władysław, who was allied with Bohemia, Bolesław II maintained close ties mainly with the Kingdom of Poland. In 1443 he supported Poland in his conflicts with Hungary, and in 1449 he was appointed judge in the disputes between King Casimir IV and the Bohemian nobility. However, Bolesław II's good relations with Poland didn't prevent the sale of the Duchy of Siewierz to Zbigniew Oleśnicki, Bishop of Kraków, which resulted in a war at Upper Silesia, who lasted until February 1447.

Bolesław II sought to obtain independent sovereignty, and therefore in 1452 he swapped with his brother Wenceslaus I the district of Bielsko for one half of Bytom, where he planned to settle. But his plans ended with his sudden death on 4 October 1452.

== Marriage and issue ==
On 28 January 1448 Bolesław II married with Anna (d. aft. 12 February 1490), daughter of Ivan Vladimirovich, Prince of Bielsk (in turn grandson of Algirdas, Grand Duke of Lithuania) by his wife Vasilisa of Halshany (sister of Sophia, fourth and last wife of King Władysław II Jagiełło). The union had the approval of Anna's cousin, King Casimir IV, who gave to the newlyweds a magnificent wedding gift: 2,000 florins. They had three children:

1. Casimir II (b. ca. 1449 – d. 13 December 1528).
2. Sophia (b. ca. 1450/52 – d. 1479), married in 1474 to Victor of Poděbrady, Duke of Münsterberg and Opava.
3. Barbara (b. ca. 1452/53 – d. bef. 12 May 1507), married firstly on 11 September 1468 to Duke Balthasar of Żagań and secondly by 18 May 1477 to Duke Jan V of Zator.

After the death of her husband, Anna cared about their son and daughters, and resided mainly in Frysztat.

== Ancestry ==
Ancestors of Bolesław II, Duke of Cieszyn

16. Mieszko I, Duke of Cieszyn
8. Casimir I, Duke of Cieszyn
17. Grzymisława
4. Przemyslaus I Noszak, Duke of Cieszyn
18. Trojden I, Duke of Masovia
9. Euphemia of Czersk-Warsaw
19. Maria of Galicia
2. Bolesław I, Duke of Cieszyn
20. Władysław of Bytom
10. Bolesław of Bytom
21. Ludgarda of Mecklenburg
5. Elisabeth of Koźle-Bytom
22. Jaroslav of Sternberg
11. Margareta of Sternberg
23. Margareta of Bílina
1. Bolesław II, Duke of Cieszyn
24. Trojden I, Duke of Masovia (= 18)
12. Siemowit III, Duke of Masovia
25. Maria of Galicia (= 19)
6. Siemowit IV, Duke of Masovia
26. Nicholas II, Duke of Opava
13. Euphemia of Opava
27. Anna of Racibórz
3. Euphemia of Masovia
28. Gediminas, Grand Duke of Lithuania
14. Algirdas, Grand Duke of Lithuania
29. Jewna
7. Alexandra of Lithuania
30. Aleksandr Mikhailovich of Tver
15. Uliana of Tver
31. Anastasia of Halych

== Footnotes ==
Regnal titles
Preceded by Bolesław I	Duke of Cieszyn with Wenceslaus I, Władysław and Przemysław II; 1431–1442	Succeeded by Wenceslaus I
Preceded by Bolesław I	Duke of Bytom (1/2) with Wenceslaus I, Władysław and Przemysław II; 1431–1442	Succeeded by Wenceslaus I
Preceded by Bolesław I	Duke of Siewierz with Wenceslaus I, Władysław and Przemysław II; 1431–1442	Succeeded by Wenceslaus I
Preceded by Bolesław I	Duke of Głogów (1/2) with Wenceslaus I, Władysław and Przemysław II; 1431–1442	Succeeded by Władysław
Preceded by Bolesław I	Duke of Ścinawa (1/2) with Wenceslaus I, Władysław and Przemysław II; 1431–1442	Succeeded by Władysław
Preceded by Wenceslaus I	Duke of Bytom (1/2); 1452	Succeeded by Wenceslaus I
