= Piotr Gamrat =

Polish Archbishop

His Excellency Piotr Gamrat
- Archbishop of Gniezno; Primate of Poland
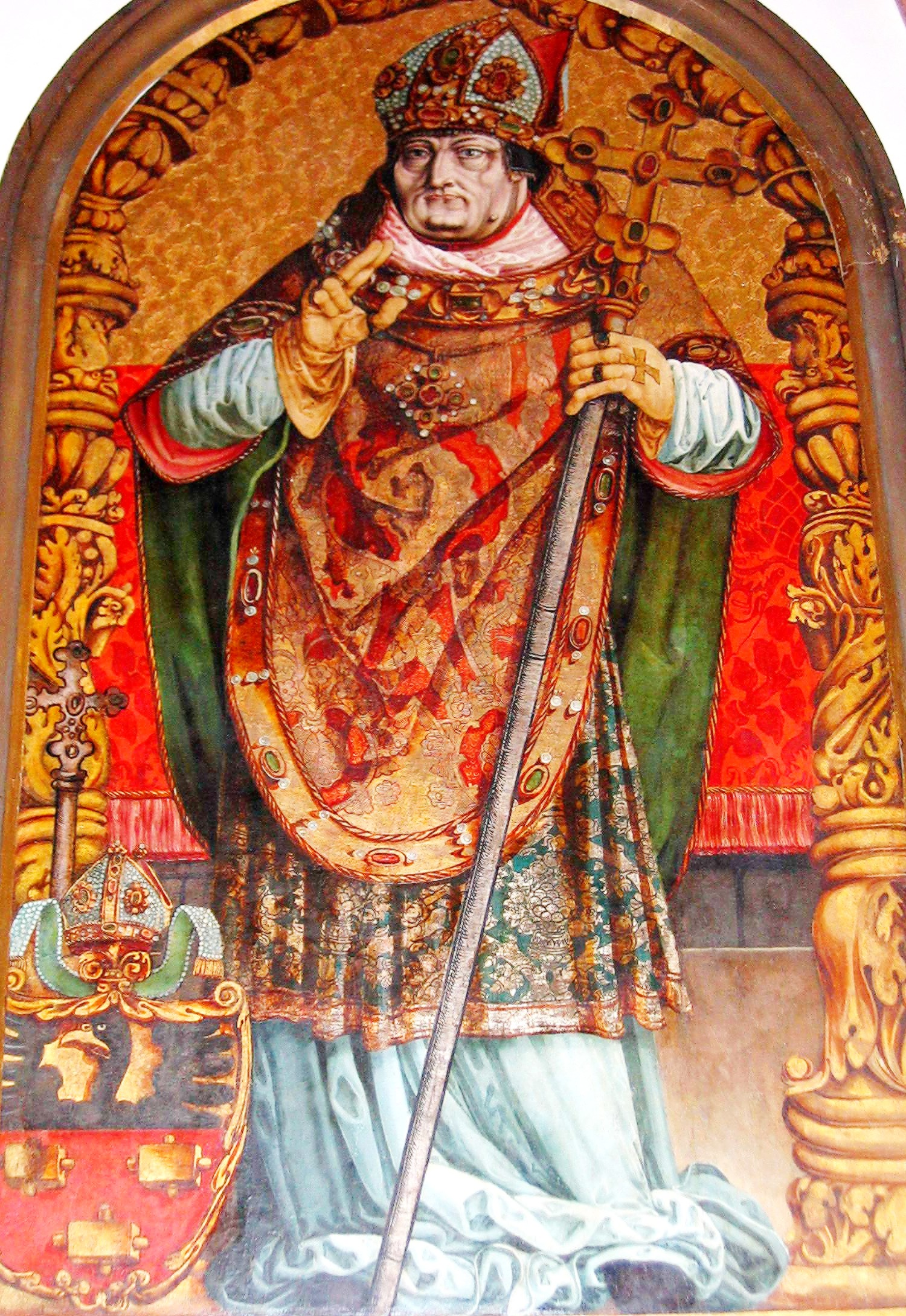
- Church: Roman Catholic
- Archdiocese: Gniezno
- Installed: 1541
- Term ended: 1545

Orders
- Consecration: 8 February 1548

Personal details
- Born: 1487
- Died: 27 August 1545 (aged 57–58) Łowicz
- Coat of arms

Piotr Gamrat of Sulima arms (1487 – 27 August 1545) was Archbishop of Gniezno and Primate of Poland.

== Biography ==
Gamrat was born in Samoklęski near Jasło, Poland. Early in his career, Gamrat was the royal secretary to Sigismund I the Old. Gamrat was bishop of Kamieniec since 1531, of Przemyśl since 1535, of Kraków since 1538 and simultaneously Archbishop of Gniezno since 1541. From 1540 until 1545 Marcin Kromer was Gamrat's secretary.

Gamrat actively fought the influence of the Protestant Reformation. He contributed to the development of sermons, reformed religious education in Poland, and reformed the local administration of the Catholic Churches. In addition to his activity in the dioceses, he led a secular lifestyle and participated in the political life of the state.

== Notes ==
Catholic Church titles
Preceded by Wawrzyniec Międzyleski	Bishop of Kamieniec; 1531–1535	Succeeded by Sebastian Branicki
Preceded by Jan Chojeński	Bishop of Przemyśl; 1535–1537	Succeeded by Stanisław Tarło
Preceded by Jan Chojeński	Bishop of Płock; 1537–1538	Succeeded by Jakub Buczacki
Preceded by Jan Chojeński	Bishop of Kraków; 1538–1545	Succeeded by Samuel Maciejowski
Preceded by Jan Latalski	Archbishop of Gniezno; Primate of Poland; 1541–1545	Succeeded by Mikołaj Dzierzgowski
