= Wenceslaus I of Cieszyn =

Wenceslaus I
- Duke of Cieszyn
- Coat-of-arms of Upper Silesia (Cieszyn, etc.)
- Born: 1413/18
- Died: 1474
- Noble family: Silesian Piasts
- Spouse: Elisabeth of Brandenburg
- Father: Boleslaus I, Duke of Cieszyn
- Mother: Euphemia of Masovia

Wenceslaus I of Cieszyn (Polish: Wacław I Cieszyński, Czech: Václav I. Těšínský, German: Wenzel I. von Teschen; 1413/18 – 1474), was a Duke of Cieszyn from 1431 (until 1442 with his brothers as co-rulers), Duke of half of Bytom during 1431–1452 (returned to him soon after until 1459) and Duke of Siewierz (until 1443).

He was the oldest son of Duke Bolesław I of Cieszyn by his second wife Euphemia, daughter of Duke Siemowit IV of Masovia.

== Life ==
After the death of his father in 1431, and although he was legally an adult and able to govern by himself, Wenceslaus remained under the tutelage of his mother, together with his younger brothers, who were his co-rulers.

Linked to the imperial court of Sigismund of Luxembourg, in 1438 Wenceslaus paid tribute to the Emperor. In the same year, he obtained for Cieszyn the right of minting his coins.

Despite maintaining good relations with Emperor Sigismund, in 1434, Wenceslaus became involved with the Hussites, particularly aiding the Burgrave of Będzin, Mikołaj Kornicz Siestrzeniec, in his campaigns against the Bishops of Kraków in the Kingdom of Poland. It was only after Krystyna Koziegłowski's retaliatory expedition to Gliwice that Wenceslaus withdrew his support and made an agreement with Poland at the congress in Będzin on 15 October 1434.

On 17 February 1439, Wenceslaus married Elisabeth (b. 1 May/29 September 1403 - d. Legnica, 31 October 1449), daughter of Frederick I, Elector of Brandenburg and widow of Louis II, Duke of Brzeg-Legnica. According to the chronicler Ambrose of Byczyny, the wedding took place two months before, on 9 December 1438 in Wrocław; however, after further research, historians believed that this date wasn't the proper marriage ceremony but only the engagement. Elisabeth is mentioned as Duchess of Cieszyn for the first time on 5 March 1439.

After six years of childless union, they were separated ca. 1445 for undisclosed reasons. Elisabeth returned to Legnica, where she died four years later, in 1449. Wenceslaus never remarried.

On 29 November 1442, Wenceslaus finally succumbed to the pressure of his brothers and agreed to the division of their lands. However, the newly created Duchies were unequal, because Wenceslaus retained in their hands most of the territories, giving to his brothers only half of both Głogów and Ścinawa (who were seriously in debt) and some parts of Cieszyn, and also retained the full authority over Bytom and Siewierz.

These actions, however, didn't resolve the financial difficulties of Wenceslaus. For this reason, on 24 December 1443, he sold the Duchy of Siewierz to Zbigniew Oleśnicki, Bishop of Kraków (and from them, that land wasn't treated as part of Silesia). This step only provides liquidity to Wenceslaus for a while. The sale of Siewierz caused a long-lasting dispute between Wenceslaus and Duke Bolko V of Głogów, who didn't accept the transaction. Ultimately, the conflict was ended by 1 July 1457 when Wenceslaus agreed with Poland.

In 1452 he swapped Bytom for Bielsko with his brother Bolesław II. After Bolesław II's death later in that year, Wenceslaus took the guardianship of his children. This enabled him to re-acquire Bytom. In 1459, Wenceslaus sold Bytom to Duke Konrad IX of Oleśnica in the amount of 1,700 fines.

During the 1460s, the political activity of Wenceslaus was significantly limited. In 1468, the childless Duke abdicated in favor of his nephew Casimir II the rule over Cieszyn (although the real power was held by Wenceslaus's brother Przemysław II).

In 1471 Wenceslaus obtained the sole authority over Bielsko, after supporting the candidacy of Władysław II as King of Bohemia.

Wenceslaus died in Bielsko in 1474. He is buried in the Dominican church in Cieszyn.

== Ancestry ==
Ancestors of Wenceslaus I of Cieszyn

16. Mieszko I, Duke of Cieszyn
8. Casimir I, Duke of Cieszyn
17. Grzymisława
4. Przemyslaus I Noszak, Duke of Cieszyn
18. Trojden I, Duke of Masovia
9. Euphemia of Czersk-Warsaw
19. Maria of Galicia
2. Bolesław I, Duke of Cieszyn
20. Władysław of Bytom
10. Bolesław of Bytom
21. Ludgarda of Mecklenburg
5. Elisabeth of Koźle-Bytom
22. Jaroslav of Sternberg
11. Margareta of Sternberg
23. Margareta of Bílina
1. Wenceslaus I, Duke of Cieszyn
24. Trojden I, Duke of Masovia (= 18)
12. Siemowit III, Duke of Masovia
25. Maria of Galicia (= 19)
6. Siemowit IV, Duke of Masovia
26. Nicholas II, Duke of Opava
13. Euphemia of Opava
27. Anna of Racibórz
3. Euphemia of Masovia
28. Gediminas, Grand Duke of Lithuania
14. Algirdas, Grand Duke of Lithuania
29. Jewna
7. Alexandra of Lithuania
30. Aleksandr Mikhailovich of Tver
15. Uliana of Tver
31. Anastasia of Halych

Wenceslaus I of Cieszyn House of Piast Born: 1413 Died: 1474
Regnal titles
Preceded by Bolesław I	Duke of Cieszyn with Władysław, Przemysław II and Bolesław II (until 1442); 1431–1468	Succeeded by Przemysław II
Preceded by Bolesław I	Duke of Bytom (1/2) with Władysław, Przemysław II and Bolesław II (until 1442); 1431–1452	Succeeded by Bolesław II
Preceded by Bolesław I	Duke of Siewierz with Władysław, Przemysław II and Bolesław II (until 1442); 1431–1443	Succeeded by Zbigniew Oleśnicki
Preceded by Bolesław I	Duke of Głogów (1/2) with Władysław, Przemysław II and Bolesław II; 1431–1442	Succeeded by Władysław
Preceded by Bolesław I	Duke of Ścinawa (1/2) with Władysław, Przemysław II and Bolesław II; 1410–1442	Succeeded by Władysław
Preceded by Bolesław II	Duke of Bytom (1/2); 1452–1459	Succeeded by Konrad IX the Black
