= Władysław of Głogów =

15th-century Silesian noble

Władysław
- Duke of Cieszyn
- Coat-of-arms of Upper Silesia (Cieszyn, etc)
- Born: c. 1420
- Died: 14 February 1460
- Noble family: Silesian Piasts
- Spouse: Margareta of Celje
- Father: Boleslaus I, Duke of Cieszyn
- Mother: Euphemia of Masovia

Władysław of Głogów (Polish: Władysław głogowski, Czech: Vladislav Těšínsko-Hlohovský, German: Wladislaus von Teschen) (c. 1420 – 14 February 1460) was a Silesian nobleman. He was the ruling Duke of Cieszyn during 1431–1442 (with his brothers as co-rulers) and from 1442 sole ruler over half of both Głogów and Ścinawa.

He was the second son of Duke Bolesław I of Cieszyn by his second wife Euphemia, daughter of Duke Siemowit IV of Masovia.

== Life ==
After the death of his father in 1431, Władysław ruled over all the Duchy together with his brothers as co-rulers, but under the tutelage of their mother. After the division of the Duchy on 29 November 1442, he received the half of both Głogów and Ścinawa as sole ruler, signed since them with the title of Duke of Cieszyn-Głogów.

He had little interference in the Cieszyn politics (actually the only activity in this area was the agreement to sell the Duchy of Siewierz by his brother Wenceslaus I in 1443) and decided to concentrated in the Głogów politics.

In December 1444 Władysław married with Margareta (1411 – 22 July 1480), daughter of Herman III, Count of Celje and widow of Herman I, Count of Montfort-Pfannberg-Bregenz. They had no children.

Władysław's major participation in the political life of his time was in 1447, when he went to Kraków and took part in the coronation of Casimir IV as King of Poland.

The Duke of Głogów supported Bohemian King George of Podebrady. On 24 August 1459, Władysław, with other Piast rulers, paid homage to King George in Swidnica and fought in his ranks near Wrocław. He was seriously wounded during the siege of this town on 1 October 1459 and died as a result of the wounds on 14 February 1460.

In his will, Władysław left his domains to both his wife Margareta (as her Oprawa wdowia) and his brother Przemysław II, who actually took the whole government over half of both Głogów and Ścinawa. Przemysław II was deposed in 1476 and half of both Głogów and Ścinawa were annexed to the Bohemian crown; however, Margareta remained in Głogów and defended the city from the ambitions of Jan II the Mad, Duke of Żagań, who, after a siege of seven weeks, on 1 May 1480 conquered the city and reunited the whole Duchy of Głogów after almost 150 years of separation.

== Ancestry ==
Ancestors of Władysław of Głogów

16. Mieszko I, Duke of Cieszyn
8. Casimir I, Duke of Cieszyn
17. Grzymisława
4. Przemyslaus I Noszak, Duke of Cieszyn
18. Trojden I, Duke of Masovia
9. Euphemia of Czersk-Warsaw
19. Maria of Galicia
2. Bolesław I, Duke of Cieszyn
20. Władysław of Bytom
10. Bolesław of Bytom
21. Ludgarda of Mecklenburg
5. Elisabeth of Koźle-Bytom
22. Jaroslav of Sternberg
11. Margareta of Sternberg
23. Margareta of Bílina
1. Władysław of Głogów
24. Trojden I, Duke of Masovia (= 18)
12. Siemowit III, Duke of Masovia
25. Maria of Galicia (= 19)
6. Siemowit IV, Duke of Masovia
26. Nicholas II, Duke of Opava
13. Euphemia of Opava
27. Anna of Racibórz
3. Euphemia of Masovia
28. Gediminas, Grand Duke of Lithuania
14. Algirdas, Grand Duke of Lithuania
29. Jewna
7. Alexandra of Lithuania
30. Aleksandr Mikhailovich of Tver
15. Uliana of Tver
31. Anastasia of Halych

Władysław of Głogów House of Piast Born: c. 1420 Died: 14 February 1460
Regnal titles
Preceded by Bolesław I	Duke of Cieszyn with Wenceslaus I, Przemysław II and Bolesław II; 1431–1442	Succeeded by Wenceslaus I
Preceded by Bolesław I	Duke of Siewierz with Wenceslaus I, Przemysław II and Bolesław II; 1431–1442	Succeeded by Wenceslaus I
Preceded by Bolesław I	Duke of Bytom (1/2) with Wenceslaus I, Przemysław II and Bolesław II; 1431–1442	Succeeded by Wenceslaus I
Preceded by Bolesław I	Duke of Głogów (1/2) with Wenceslaus I, Przemysław II and Bolesław II (until 1442); 1431–1460	Succeeded by Przemysław II (titular); Margareta (nominal)
Preceded by Bolesław I	Duke of Ścinawa (1/2) with Wenceslaus I, Przemysław II and Bolesław II (until 1442); 1431–1460	Succeeded by Przemysław II (titular); Margareta (nominal)
