= Casimir II of Cieszyn =

Casimir II
- Duke of Cieszyn
- Born: c. 1449
- Died: 13 December 1528
- Noble family: Silesian Piasts
- Spouse: Johanna of Poděbrady
- Issue: Frederick of Cieszyn; Wenceslaus II, Duke of Cieszyn
- Father: Boleslaus II, Duke of Cieszyn
- Mother: Anna of Bielsk (House of Gediminids)

Casimir II of Cieszyn (Polish: Kazimierz, Czech: Kazimír; c. 1449 – 13 December 1528) was a Duke of Cieszyn since 1477, ruler over Koźle during 1479–1509, since 1493 ruler over Wołów, over Pszczyna during 1498–1517, from 1506 over Opava, Duke of Głogów since 1506 (for life). Also he was Landeshauptmann General of Silesia during 1497–1504 and 1507–1517, since 1517 until his death, Landeshauptmann (starosta generalny) over the Upper Silesia.

He was the only son of Bolesław II, Duke of Cieszyn, by his wife Anna, daughter of Ivan Vladimirovich, Prince of Bielsk.

== Life ==
After the early death of his father in 1452, Casimir II was raised by his uncle Przemysław II, who gave him the town of Bielsko and surrounding villages in 1460.

Casimir II's first political intervention was by 1471, when he supported King Władysław II Jagiellon during his conflicts with the Bohemian nobility. Four years later (in 1475), Casimir II attended to the marriage of Princess Hedwig of Poland (King Casimir IV's daughter) with Duke Georg of Bavaria-Landshut. When Przemysław II died in 1477, Casimir II had enough political experience and could take control over the whole Duchy of Cieszyn without any co-rulers, because all his uncles died without male descendants.

However, Casimir II couldn't take the government over the other half of Głogów, then under the rule of Margareta of Celje, widow of his uncle Władysław as her dower. He could do so formally, however, because the facto rule was in the hands of King Matthias Corvinus of Hungary and Bohemia). Despite the claims of Jan II the Mad, Duke of Żagań (who was supported by King Matthias), Casimir II obtained a political goal when he was made ruler of Głogów as guardian of Margareta by the city council. However, this success was short-lived: on 8 October 1478, Casimir II's forces were defeated in Krosno Odrzańskie by Jan II's troops.

Despite his defeat, Casimir II continued his pretensions and began negotiations with King Matthias. Under the treaty signed on 10 October 1479, the Duke of Cieszyn waived his claims by the amount of 2,000 florins. In addition, Casimir II was compelled to paid homage to the King on 12 August of that year in Olomouc.

Despite the formal abandonment of his pretensions in Lower Silesia, Casimir II didn't change his ambitions, and in 1480 he obtained Pszczyna after his marriage with Johanna, daughter of Wiktoryn of Poděbrady, Duke of Opava (although in practice he could take formal possession of this land only in 1498), who was supposedly to be a great help to him in his plans to regain Głogów, then under the rule of Jan II. Another defeat, this time at the Battle of Góra, forced Casimir II to accept the definitely resignation of the disputed territory on 7 June 1481.

In the following years, Casimir II approached the Bohemian King Władysław II Jagielloń. As a result, after the death of Matthias Corvinus in 1490, he was appointed Starost General of Silesia. He held the office of the Duke of Cieszyn from 1477 until 1504, when the king decided to replace him with his brother Sigismund Jagiellon. However, when Sigismund inherited the Polish crown in 1506, after the death of his brother Alexander Jagiellon, the dignity of Starost returned to Casimir II. This time, he held the office until his death. The new Polish King gave Casimir II the Duchy of Głogów but only during his lifetime. Soon after, and by right to his wife, he obtained the Duchy of Opawa, who increased his domains along with half of Ścinawa (Wołów), who was bought by him in 1493.

In internal politics, Casimir II showed hard-line stances in the fight against banditry in the duchy. However, his rule as Starost general wasn't count with great support in Silesia, especially with the Church, whose opposition was made clear in 1501, when the Chapter refused the candidacy of Casimir II's eldest son Frederick as new Bishop of Wrocław.

A significant item in Silesia was the dispute between the Dukes of Opole, Nicholas II and Jan II. In order to end the conflict, a meeting was arranged in Nysa, where were present Casimir II, his father-in-law Wiktoryn of Poděbrady, Nicholas II and the Bishop of Wrocław, Jan IV Roth. During the meeting, on 26 June 1497, the tragedy occurred: Nicholas II tried to stab both the Duke of Cieszyn and Bishop Roth. Despite the protests of nobles and relatives, Casimir II issued the death sentence to Nicholas II, who was beheaded in the Nysa market the next day, on 27 June 1497. Duke Jan II, after hearing the news of his brother's execution, began to prepare a brutally retaliatory expedition against Cieszyn. However, the diplomatic actions of King Władysław II Jagiellon prevented the war between both dukes, with disastrous consequences to Silesia.

The Duke of Cieszyn's political importance reached his apogee in 1512, when King Sigismund I the Old married with Casimir II's niece Barbara Zápolya (daughter of his cousin Hedwig). The excellent relations with Poland provided to Casimir II the opportunity of purchase several buildings in Kraków and the surrounding areas. Also, the king's protection enabled Casimir II to manage the complaints in 1514 of the Silesian cities, who accused him of incompetence.

On 6 January 1515, Casimir II obtained from the Bohemian King Władysław II Jagiellon the diploma who certified his rule over the Duchy of Opawa, but only during his lifetime.

In 1517, during transitional financial difficulties, Casimir II decided to sell the town of Pszczyna to the Hungarian magnate Alexis Thurzo for 40,000 guilders.

Around 1510, Casimir II was involved in the political intrigues around the succession of the childless Duke of Opole, Jan II the Good, although he ordered the death of his brother Nicholas II years before. At first it seemed that the Duke of Cieszyn was the heir presumptive, especially when he was able to obtain in 1517 from Duke Frederick II of Legnica (another of the candidates to the Opole succession) the document confirming the right of inheritance over the property of his Opole cousin. Casimir II died before Jan II, who decided to leave his domains to George of Hohenzollern, Duke of Krnov (although perhaps Casimir II, before his own death, transferred all his rights to George: this maybe happened in 1518 after the wedding of Wenceslaus II, Casimir II's second son and heir, with George's sister, Anna).

In 1527 Casimir II, as representative of the Bohemian king, went to Hungary, where he was a mediator between his nephew Jan Zápolya and Ferdinand of Habsburg. However, his efforts were unsuccessful.

Casimir II was not only a skillful politician, but also a very good ruler. During his rule, Cieszyn was economically stabilized. Thanks to the privileges given by him, further development of the towns occurred, after he gave to them many privileges. He cared especially about the capital town of Cieszyn, and after the great fire in the late 15th century, he founded a town square which persists to date. In 1496, Casimir II established the current market and built a new town hall. By 1527, the Duchy of Cieszyn's value was estimated at 670,000 florins, but without overpassed the income of the neighboring Duchy of Opole. The salary of Casimir II as Starost General (1,200 guilders a year), and the incomes derived from the towns near Kraków allowed him to buy the cities of Mistek and Friedland from the Bishop of Olomouc in 1527.

Casimir II died on 13 December 1528. It is unknown where he was buried, but it is assumed that it happened in one of the churches of Cieszyn or Opawa.

== Marriage and issue ==
By 15 February 1480, Casimir II married with Johanna (ca. 1463 – 24 July 1496), daughter of Wiktoryn of Poděbrady, Duke of Opava. They had two sons:

1. Frederick (1480/83 – June 1507).
2. Wenceslaus II (1488/96 – 17 November 1524).

Although Frederick was the oldest son, he was destined to the Church and died in 1507. The second son, Wenceslaus II, who was viewed as his father's successor, also died before his father, in 1524. For this, on his death Casimir II was succeeded by his grandson Wenceslaus III Adam, the only surviving son of Wenceslaus II.

Regnal titles
Preceded by Przemysław II	Duke of Cieszyn with Wenceslaus II during 1518-1524; 1477–1528	Succeeded by Wenceslaus III Adam
Preceded by Konrad X the White	Duke of Ścinawa (1/2); 1493–1528	Succeeded by Frederick II
Preceded by Sigismund I the Old	Duke of Głogów; 1506–1528	Succeeded by Annexed to the Kingdom of Bohemia next holder Frederick II
Preceded by Direct sovereignty of the Kingdom of Bohemia last holder Wiktoryn	Duke of Opawa; 1506–1528	Succeeded by Annexed to the Kingdom of Bohemia
