= Jan Chojeński =

Polish bishop

John Chojeński (1486–1538) was a sixteenth-century Polish bureaucrat and church leader. and beatified person.

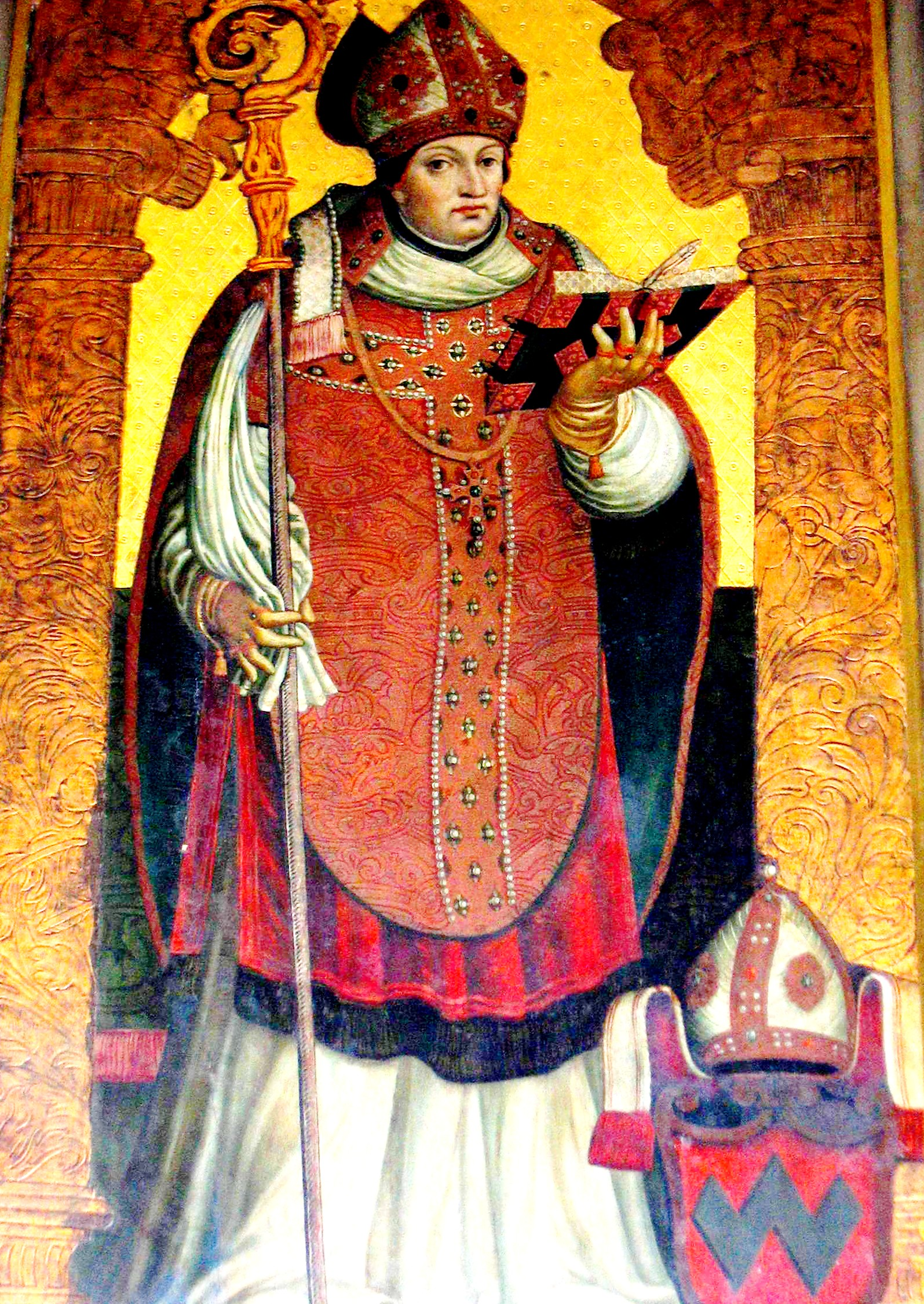
bp Jan Chojeński

He was born into the Abdank noble family on 17 March 1486 in the town of Golejówku near Sieradza in Małopolska and earned a doctor of laws at the University of Siena.

He was Chancellor of the Crown, and after 1526, secretary of the king, bishop of Przemyśl from 1531, Bishop of Płock from 1535, bishop from 1537 and archdeacon of Kraków.

A trusted official of King Sigismund I the Old, he defended the privileges of the church and having a doctor of laws focused around Poland's intellectual elite and supported many eminent humanists of his day. He founded a scholarship to honour Marcin Kromer, allowing a student to study in Padua and supported professor of medicine Joseph Ostrich.

At The Diet Piotrków in 1538, which dealt with restrictions on the economic rights of the Jews he made a speech demanding the expulsion of the Jews from Poland. The next day (11 March 1538) he was dead. This became the basis for devising suspicion that he was poisoned. He was buried behind the altar in the Wawel Cathedral. Currently his tombstone is in King John Albert Chapel in Wawel Cathedral (formerly Bożego Ciała).

Religious titles
Preceded by John Latalski	Bishop of Płock; 1531 – 1538	Succeeded by Piotr Gamrat
