= Euphemia of Masovia =

Duchess of Cieszyn

Euphemia of Masovia (Polish: Eufemia mazowiecka; 1395/97 – before 17 September 1447), was Duchess of Cieszyn by marriage to Bolesław I, Duke of Cieszyn, and regent of the Duchy of Cieszyn during the minority of her sons from 1431.

She was the third daughter of Siemowit IV, Duke of Masovia and Alexandra, daughter of Algirdas, Grand Duke of Lithuania and sister of King Władysław II Jagiełło of Poland, and thus a Polish princess member of the House of Piast in the Masovian branch.

== Life ==
According to the Chronicle of Jan Długosz, Euphemia had a great and natural charm, and because of this she was also known as Ofka. King Władysław II, Euphemia's uncle, wanted to make a close bond between Kraków and Upper Silesia, and for this reason he was probably instrumental in her marriage with Bolesław I, Duke of Cieszyn. Because Euphemia and Bolesław I were related in the third degree of consanguinity, a Papal dispensation was needed for the union, which was granted on 27 January 1412. The wedding took place ten months later, on 20 November, probably in the town of Wiślica. In 1424, Euphemia and her husband took part in the coronation of King Władysław II's fourth and last wife, Sophia of Halshany.

After Bolesław I's death on 6 May 1431, Euphemia took the regency of the Duchy of Cieszyn on behalf of her minor sons, who inherited the lands as a co-rulers. She continued her husband's policies supporting the towns and in 1438 co-decided, with her son Wenceslaus I, to give Cieszyn the right to mint coins.

Despite her sons becoming legally able to rule by themselves, Euphemia continued to hold supreme authority over the Duchy. With her consent, her sons were allowed to sell the Duchy of Siewierz to Zbigniew Oleśnicki, Bishop of Kraków, on 24 December 1443.

On 29 November 1442 the co-Dukes of Cieszyn made a formal division of their domains; however, the unity of the Duchy was maintained during Euphemia's lifetime. She died before 17 September 1447 and was presumably buried alongside her husband in Dominican church in Cieszyn.

== Issue ==
Euphemia gave birth to five children:

- Alexandra of Cieszyn (ca. 1412 - d. aft. 6 October 1463), married to László Garai, Palatine and Ban of Macsó.
- Wenceslaus I, Duke of Cieszyn (1413/18 - 1474).
- Władysław, Duke of Głogów (ca. 1420 – 14 February 1460).
- Przemysław II, Duke of Cieszyn (1422/25 - 18 March 1477).
- Bolesław II, Duke of Cieszyn (ca. 1425/28 - 4 October 1452).
