= Duchy of Siewierz =

Silesian duchy (1312–1790)

Coordinates: 50°28′08″N 19°14′10″E

Duchy of Siewierz Ducatus Severiensis Księstwo Siewierskie
- Silesian duchy Possession of the Archbishop of Kraków; Polish–Lithuanian Commonwealth
- 1312–1795
- Coat of arms

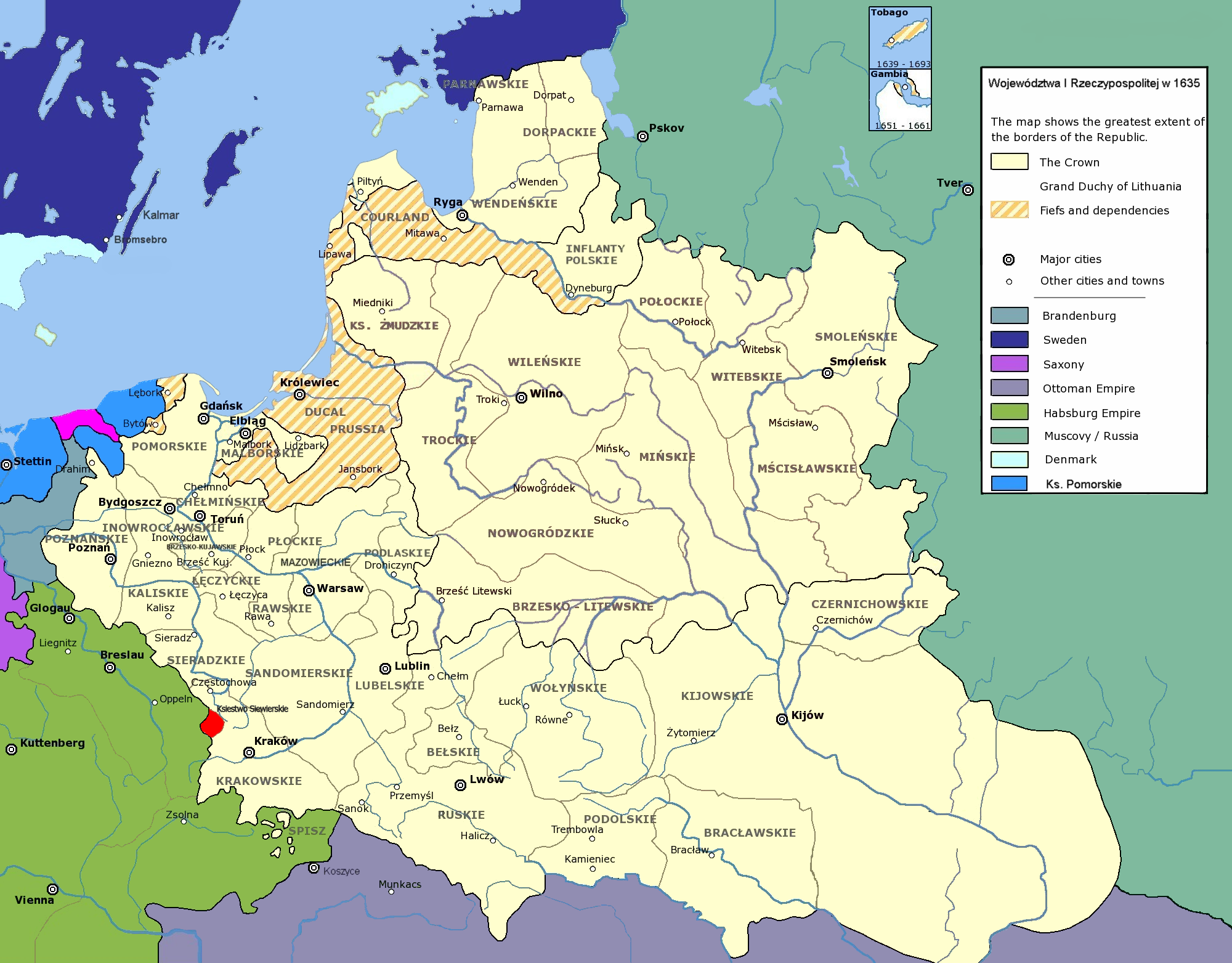
- Subdivisions of the Polish–Lithuanian Commonwealth in 1635, Duchy of Siewierz marked in red
- Capital: Siewierz
- History
  - Mieszko of Bytom Duke of Siewierz: 1312
  - Acquired by Cieszyn: 1337
  - Purchased by the Archbishop of Kraków: 1443
  - Incorporated into the Polish–Lithuanian Commonwealth: 1790
  - Annexed by Prussia: 1795
  - Jean Lannes titular Prince of Siewierz: 1807
Preceded by	Succeeded by
Duchy of Bytom	New Silesia
- Today part of: Poland

The Duchy of Siewierz was a duchy with its capital in Siewierz. The area was initially part of Lesser Poland, but it was incorporated into Duchy of Silesia established after the death of Duke Bolesław III Wrymouth in 1138 during the times of the fragmentation of Poland. In 1443, the Duchy of Siewierz became a Duchy of Lesser Poland under the control of the Crown of the Kingdom of Poland, which made the Duchy rule by the bishops of Kraków, and here ended Siewierz's history with Silesia, as it became again part of Lesser Poland.

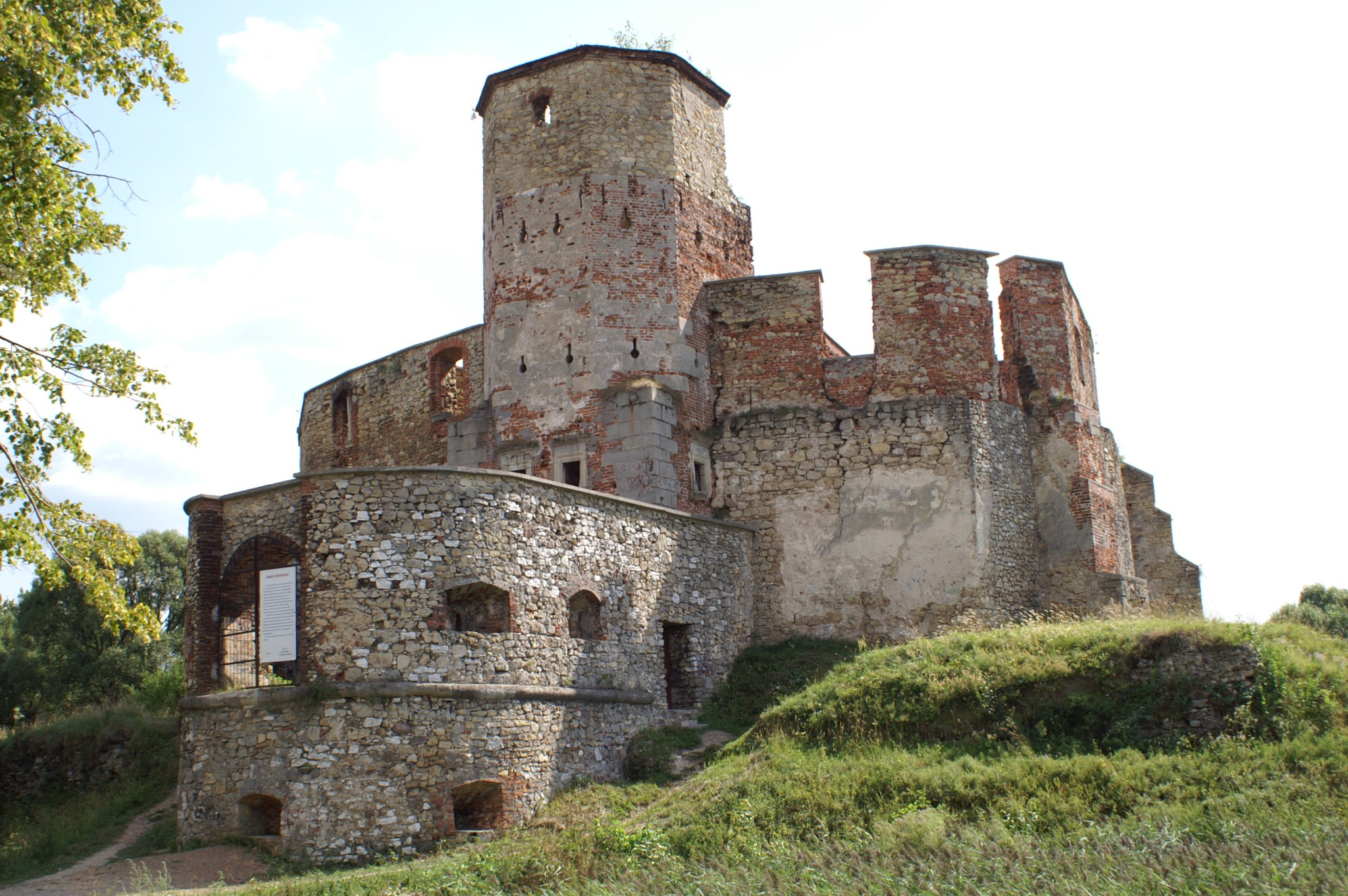
Siewierz Castle

Siewierz was ruled by the Silesian Piasts as part of the Duchy of Bytom under Duke Casimir. In 1312 he granted the town to his youngest son Mieszko, who renounced it in favour of his brother Władysław. In 1337 it was acquired by Casimir I, Duke of Cieszyn, whose scion Wenceslaus I sold it to the Archbishop of Kraków in 1443. Zygmunt Gloger in his book "Historical geography of lands of ancient Poland" ("Geografia historyczna ziem dawnej Polski"), published in 1900, writes that the Duchy of Siewierz belonged to Lesser Poland, after it was bought by the Archbishops of Kraków.

Since 1443, after its acquisition by Archbishop Zbigniew Cardinal Oleśnicki for 6,000 silver groats, it was, alongside the Duchy of Nysa, the only ecclesiastical duchy in the region (ruled by a bishop of the Catholic Church). On many levels this tiny principality was almost a 'country within a country': it had its own laws, treasury and army.

The union of the duchy with Lesser Poland was concluded when in 1790 the Great Sejm formally incorporated the Duchy as a Land of the Polish Crown into the Polish–Lithuanian Commonwealth. In the course of the Third Partition of Poland in 1795, the duchy and its adjacent regions were annexed by Prussia and incorporated into the new province of New Silesia. In 1800 the Kraków bishops moved their residence away from Siewierz.

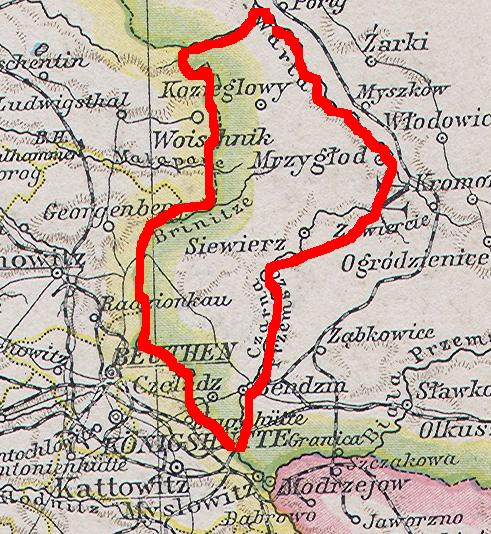
Territory of the former duchy within Congress Poland

Temporarily recreated in 1807 by Napoleon as a gift for his marshal Jean Lannes within the Duchy of Warsaw, after the 1815 Congress of Vienna the lands became part of Congress Poland under Imperial Russian rule. In 1918, Siewierz became part of the Second Polish Republic, from 1939 to 1945 it was occupied by Nazi Germany. The bishops of Kraków continued to use the title of a Prince of Siewierz until the death of Adam Stefan Sapieha in 1951. The Dukes of Montebello claim the title prince de Sievers, due to their descent from Marshal Lannes, but without recognition from the French or Polish States.

== Dukes ==
- Mieszko bytomski 1312-1328
- Władysław bytomski 1328-1337
- Kazimierz I cieszyński 1337-1358
- Bolko II Mały 1359-1368
- Przemysław I Noszak 1368-1410
- ? 1410-1423
- Zbigniew Oleśnicki 1423-1455
- Tomasz Strzępiński 1455-1460
- Jakub z Sienna 1461-1463
- Jan Gruszczyński 1463-1464
- Jan Lutek 1464-1471
- Jan Rzeszowski 1471-1488
- Fryderyk Jagiellończyk 1488-1503
- Jan Konarski 1503-1524
- Piotr Tomicki 1524-1535
- Jan Latalski 1536-1537
- Jan Chojeński 1537-1538
- Piotr Gamrat 1538-1545
- Samuel Maciejowski 1546-1550
- Andrzej Zebrzydowski 1551-1560
- Filip Padniewski 1560-1572
- Franciszek Krasiński 1572-1577
- Piotr Myszkowski 1577-1591
- Jerzy Radziwiłł 1591-1600

== See also ==
- Dukes of Silesia
- History of Siewierz
- Prince-Bishopric of Warmia
