= Siewierz =

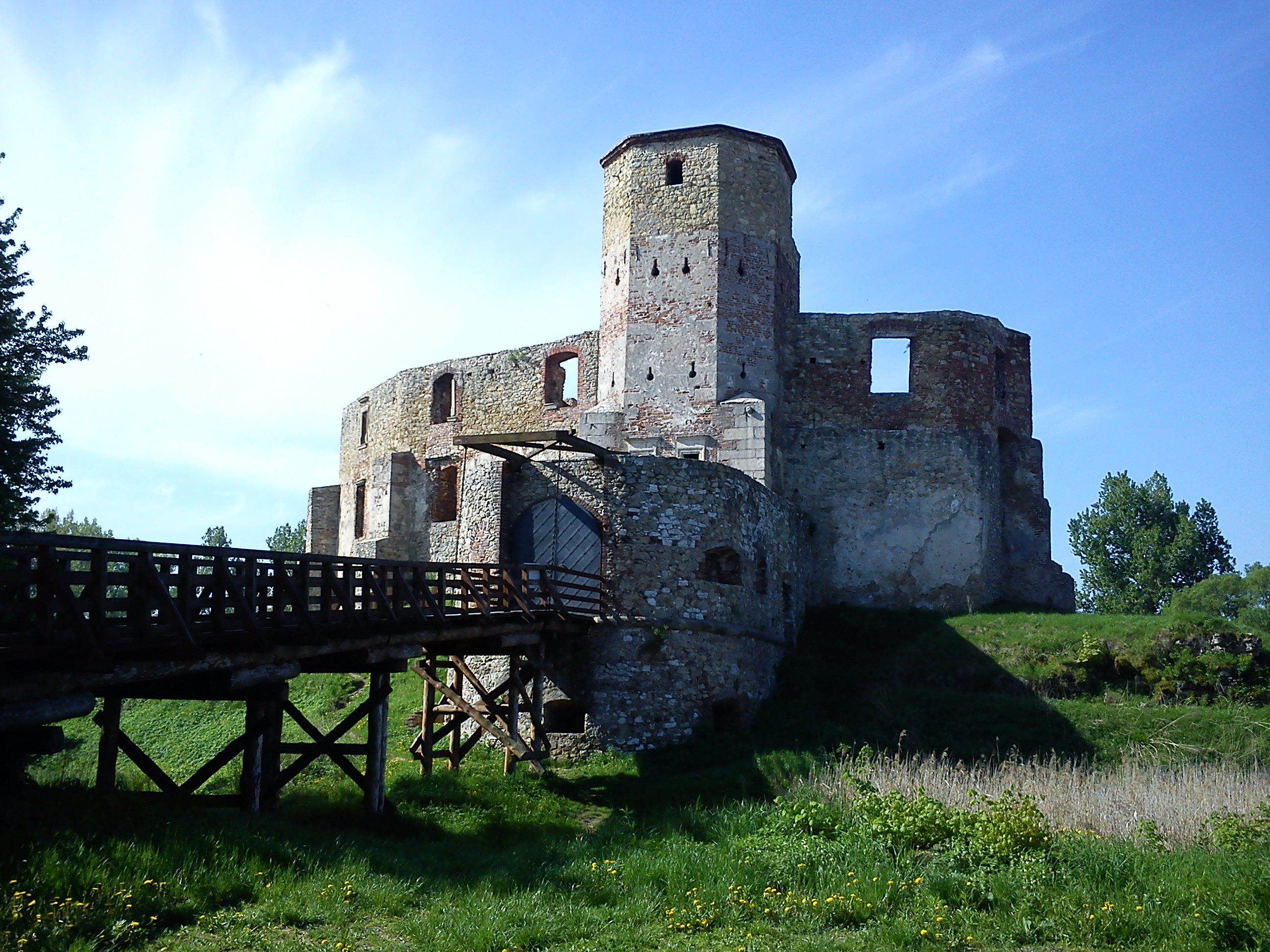
- Castle of Kraków bishops

- Coat of arms

- Location within Poland
- Coordinates: 50°28′24″N 19°13′59″E
- Country: Poland
- Voivodeship: Silesian
- County: Będzin
- Gmina: Siewierz
- City rights: 1276

Government
  - Mayor: Dariusz Waluszczyk

Area
  - Total: 38.22 km^{2} (14.76 sq mi)

Population (2019-06-30)
  - Total: 5,581
  - Density: 146.0/km^{2} (378.2/sq mi)
- Time zone: UTC+1 (CET)
  - Summer (DST): UTC+2 (CEST)
- Postal code: 42-470
- Car plates: SBE
- Primary airport: Katowice Airport
- Website: https://www.siewierz.pl

Siewierz [ˈɕɛvʲɛʂ] is a town in southern Poland, in the Będzin County in the Silesian Voivodeship, seat of Gmina Siewierz. Siewierz is located in Dąbrowa Basin (Zagłębie Dąbrowskie), which is part of the historical and geographical region of Lesser Poland.

== History ==
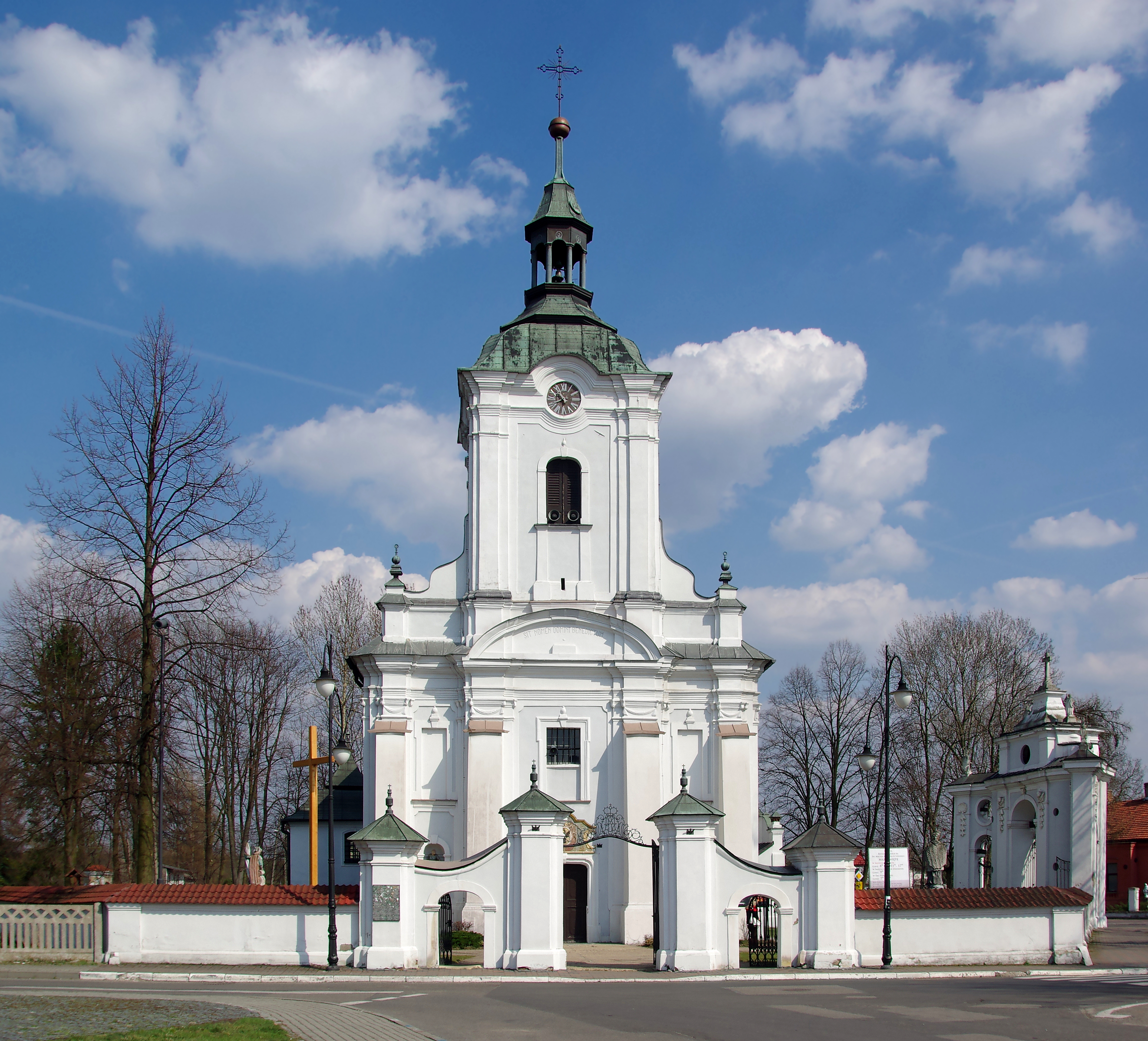
Baroque Church of Saint Matthias

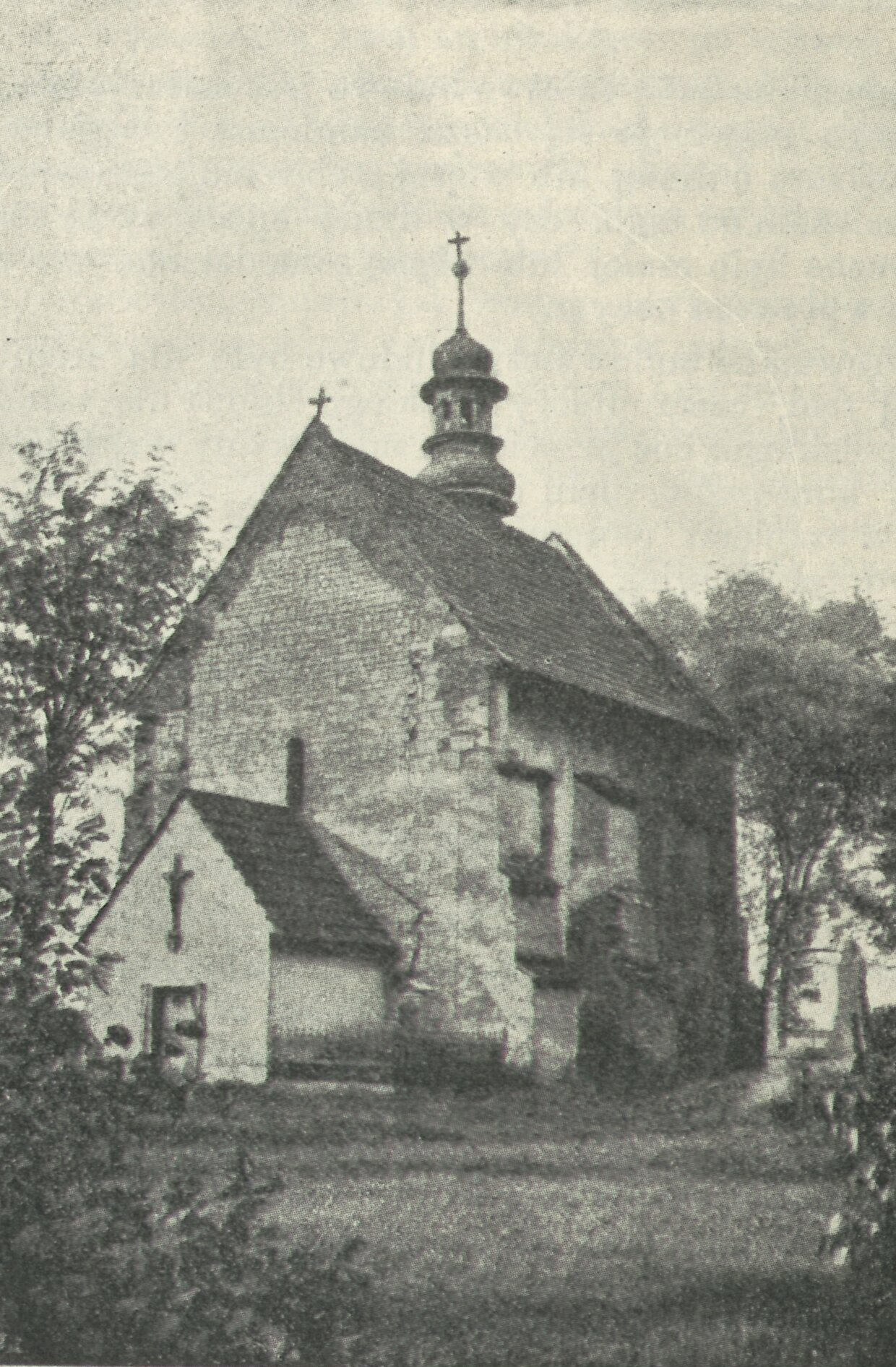
Church of St. John the Baptist circa 1916

Siewierz was first mentioned in 1125, and was administered by the Castellan of Bytom. In 1177, Casimir II of Poland granted Siewierz to Mieszko IV Tanglefoot, duke of Silesia and Racibórz, together with whole Duchy of Bytom. The town became a seat of a separate castellan by the beginning of the 13th century. During the first Mongol invasion of Poland, in 1241, the Mongols burned the town, and razed the fort to ground.

In 1276, Siewierz received city status. On 26 February 1289, in front of the town gates, the allied forces of Władysław I the Elbow-high, then Duke of Kujawy and Mazovia, defeated the army of Henry IV Probus, duke of Wrocław and Kraków.

Together with most of Silesia in years 1327–35, Siewierz – as a part of the Bytom Duchy – was subjugated to the Kingdom of Bohemia. In 1337, Duke Vladislaus of Bytom sold Siewierz to Casimir I, Duke of Cieszyn. In 1359 the duke of Cieszyn bought Siewierz from Duke Bolko II the Small, for 2,500 marks. The king Charles IV authorized the sale the same year.

On 30 December 1443, Zbigniew Oleśnicki, the bishop of Kraków, bought Siewierz from Wenceslaus I of Cieszyn, who was deeply in debts then. The sale was for 6,000 Prague groschen. The bishops of Kraków became dukes of Siewierz, the duchy became de facto a part of the Polish Crown, and the town became the seat of the bishops of Kraków. They also constructed a castle in Siewierz. Through these events, Siewierz again became part of Lesser Poland, where it remains to this day.

Polish Baroque poet Walenty Roździeński stayed in the town in the early 17th century. In 1790, near to the doom of the Polish–Lithuanian Commonwealth, the ecclesiastic duchy of Siewierz was incorporated directly into the Crown of the Kingdom of Poland. In 1795, Siewierz was annexed by Prussia in the Third Partition of Poland, and included in the new province of New Silesia. In 1800, the seat of the bishop moved away from the town.

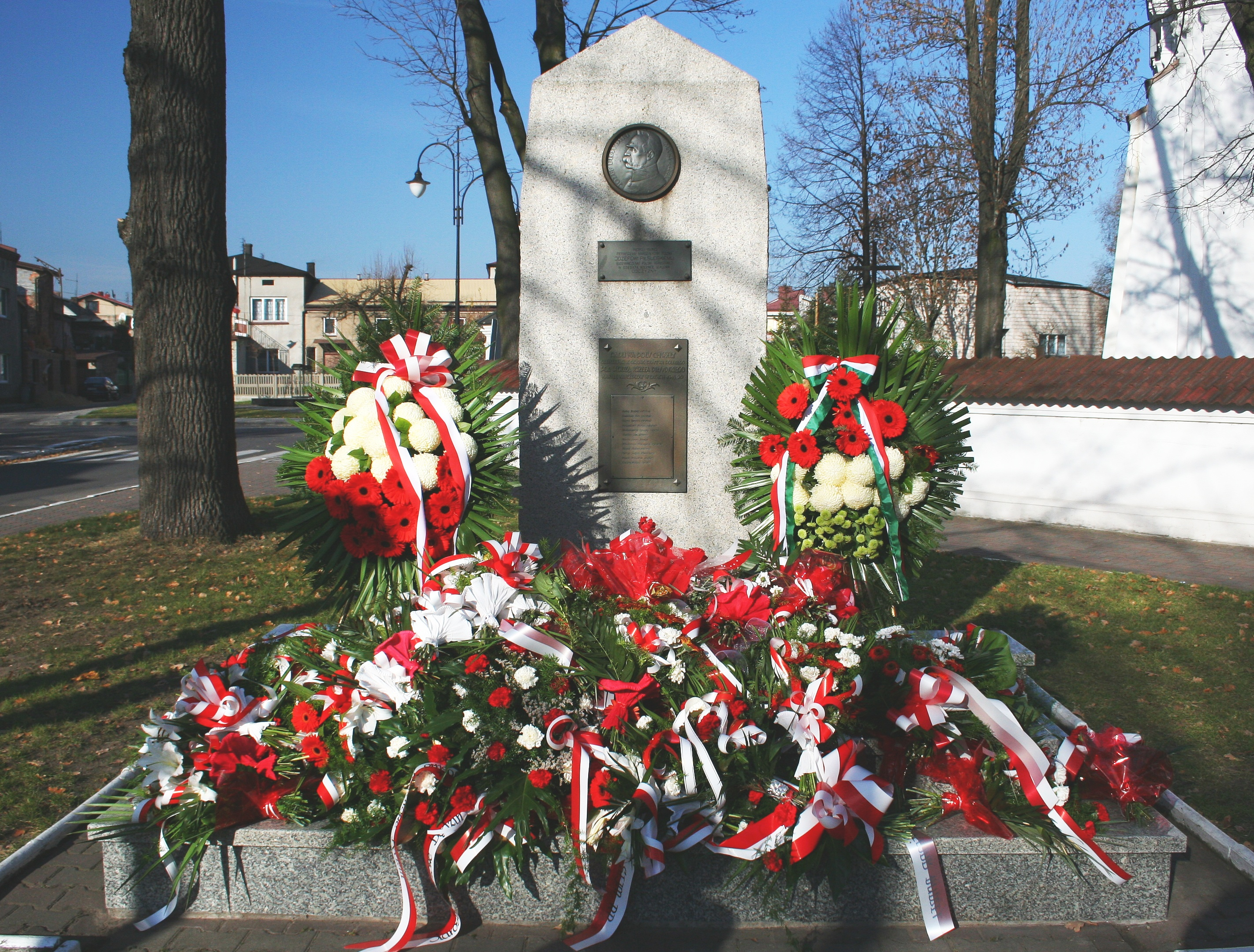
Memorial to Józef Piłsudski

In 1807, Napoleon recreated the duchy of Siewierz as a principality (Sievers), and granted it to Jean Lannes, after Prussia was forced to cede all her acquisitions from the Second and Third Partitions of Poland. After the defeat of Napoleon, Siewierz was included in Congress Poland, under Imperial Russian rule. The town declined continuously, due to the lacking of industry and communication. During the January Uprising, in February 1863, Siewierz was captured by Polish insurgents after their victory in the Battle of Sosnowiec nearby. In 1870, it lost its city status as part of Tsarist anti-Polish repressions following the fall of the January Uprising. In 1918, Poland regained independence, and Siewierz became part of the Second Polish Republic.

During the German invasion of Poland, which started World War II in September 1939, Siewierz was invaded and captured by Nazi Germany, and already on September 4, 1939, German troops committed a massacre of 10 Poles in the town, including one woman and several teenagers (see Nazi crimes against the Polish nation). The town was then occupied by Germany until 1945.

In 1962 it regained its city status.

== Sights ==
The most significant historic sights of Siewierz are the ruins of the medieval castle of Kraków bishops, the Baroque Church of Saint Matthias and the Romanesque Church of Saint John, which is one of the oldest preserved churches in Poland.

== Sports ==
The local football club is LKS Przemsza Siewierz. It competes in the IV Liga Silesian group (fifth division of polish football)

== Twin towns – sister cities ==
See twin towns of Gmina Siewierz.
