= Bolesław I, Duke of Cieszyn =

Duke of Bytom, Cieszyn, Głogów, Ścinawa and Siewierz

Bolesław I of Cieszyn
- Coat-of-arms of Upper Silesia (Cieszyn, Opole, etc).
- Born: c. 1363
- Died: 6 May 1431
- Buried: Dominican church in Cieszyn
- Noble family: Silesian Piast
- Spouses: Margareta of Opava-Ratibor; Euphemia of Masovia
- Issue: Alexandra; Wenceslaus I, Duke of Cieszyn; Władysław of Głogów; Przemyslaus II, Duke of Cieszyn; Boleslaus II, Duke of Cieszyn
- Father: Przemyslaus I Noszak
- Mother: Eisabeth of Koźle-Bytom

Bolesław I of Cieszyn (Polish: Bolesław I cieszyński, Czech: Boleslav I. Těšínský, German: Boleslaus I. von Teschen) (c. 1363 – 6 May 1431) was a Duke of half of Bytom and Siewierz from 1405, Duke of Cieszyn and half of both Głogów and Ścinawa from 1410, and Duke of Toszek and Strzelin during 1410–1414.

He was the second son of Przemysław I Noszak, Duke of Cieszyn by his wife Elisabeth, daughter of Bolesław, Duke of Koźle-Bytom. In the chronicle of Jan Długosz he is named the eldest son, but this is certainly a mistake, because elsewhere, Przemysław of Oświęcim was always placed before Bolesław.

== Life ==
In 1405 Bolesław's father entrusted him with direct rule over Bytom and Siewierz and the government of the Duchy of Cieszyn. A year later (1406), the murder of his brother Przemysław originated a break in relations between Bolesław and his father. Shortly after, Bolesław married Margareta, the sister of John II the Iron, Duke of Racibórz, who was the instigator of Przemysław's death. According to Jan Długosz, his father, Duke Przemysław I Noszak strongly opposed this union, and even threatened to disinherit Bolesław if he maintained contact with the Přemyslid Dukes of Opava and Racibórz. The early death of Margareta shortly after the wedding contributed to the reconciliation between Bolesław and his father, which was formally signed on 7 September 1407.

After his father's death in 1410, Bolesław inherited Cieszyn, Toszek, Strzelin and half of both Głogów and Ścinawa. Also, he was named regent of the Duchy of Oświęcim on behalf of his nephew Casimir, only son of Bolesław's brother.

Bolesław's second marriage in 1412 to Euphemia (called also Ofka), daughter of Duke Siemowit IV of Masovia, was probably suggested by King Władysław II Jagiełło of Poland (Euphemia's maternal uncle), who saw the opportunity to make close bonds between Upper Silesia and Kraków. However, Bolesław and Euphemia were related in the third degree of consanguinity, so a Papal dispensation was needed, which was granted on 27 January 1412. The wedding took place some months later, on 20 November.

His alliance with Jagiełło quickly brought him results, as in 1414 Bolesław took an active part in the Polish-Teutonic War at the King's side. However, he didn't appear in the Congress of Wrocław in 1420, where King Sigismund of Bohemia (future Holy Roman Emperor), as a mediator between the Teutonic Order and the King of Poland, had issued an unfavorable ruling to the Polish King.

In 1414 Bolesław decided to transfer to his nephew Casimir full government over Oświęcim, Gliwice and Toszek. However, Casimir's ambitions erupted in a conflict between him and Bolesław, which ended two years later, on 11 November 1416, when (following the mediation of Duke Henry IX of Lubin), the Duke of Cieszyn give the town of Strzelin and 300 fines as payment to Casimir. Bolesław retained the rest of his lands.

Although the Duchy of Cieszyn was under the rule of the Kingdom of Bohemia, Bolesław didn't support the House of Luxembourg in its struggle for the Bohemian crown, but maintained good relations with Kraków and the Bohemian townspeople. In 1422, despite the Bohemian-Polish dispute, Bolesław was a guest at the court of King Władysław II Jagiełło, and took part in the coronation of his wife, Queen Sophia of Halshany.

During the last years of his reign, Bolesław supported Bohemian side during the Hussite Wars, but didn't participate in the war itself.

In internal politics, he supported the development of the towns. He ceded several rights to some towns, for example Bytom (where in 1412 he give the right to inheritance to the burgers), Frýdek and Bielsko. This was also partly motivated by the lack of money in the duchies' budget.

Bolesław died on 6 May 1431 and was buried in the Dominican church in Cieszyn.

== Marriages and Issue ==
On 1 January 1406, Bolesław married firstly Margareta (b. 1380 – d. bef. 7 September 1407), daughter of Duke John I of Opava-Ratibor. They had no children.

On 20 November 1412, Bolesław married secondly Euphemia (Ofka) (b. 1395/98 – d. bef. 17 September 1447), daughter of Duke Siemowit IV of Masovia. They had five children:

1. Alexandra (b. ca. 1412 – d. aft. 6 October 1463), married to László Garai, Palatine and Ban of Macsó.
2. Wenceslaus I (b. 1413/18 – d. 1474).
3. Władysław (b. ca. 1420 – d. 14 February 1460).
4. Przemysław II (b. 1422/25 – d. 18 March 1477).
5. Bolesław II (b. ca. 1425/28 – d. 4 October 1452).

Bolesław I, Duke of Cieszyn House of Piast Born: c. 1363 Died: 6 May 1431
Regnal titles
Preceded by Przemysław I Noszak	Duke of Bytom (1/2); 1405–1431	Succeeded by Wenceslaus I Władysław; Przemysław II; Bolesław II
Preceded by Przemysław I Noszak	Duke of Cieszyn; 1410–1431	Succeeded by Wenceslaus I Władysław; Przemysław II; Bolesław II
Preceded by Przemysław I Noszak	Duke of Siewierz; 1410–1431	Succeeded by Wenceslaus I Władysław; Przemysław II; Bolesław II
Preceded by Przemysław I Noszak	Duke of Głogów (1/2); 1410–1431	Succeeded by Wenceslaus I Władysław; Przemysław II; Bolesław II
Preceded by Przemysław I Noszak	Duke of Ścinawa (1/2); 1410–1431	Succeeded by Wenceslaus I Władysław; Przemysław II; Bolesław II
