= Samuel Maciejowski =

Polish bishop

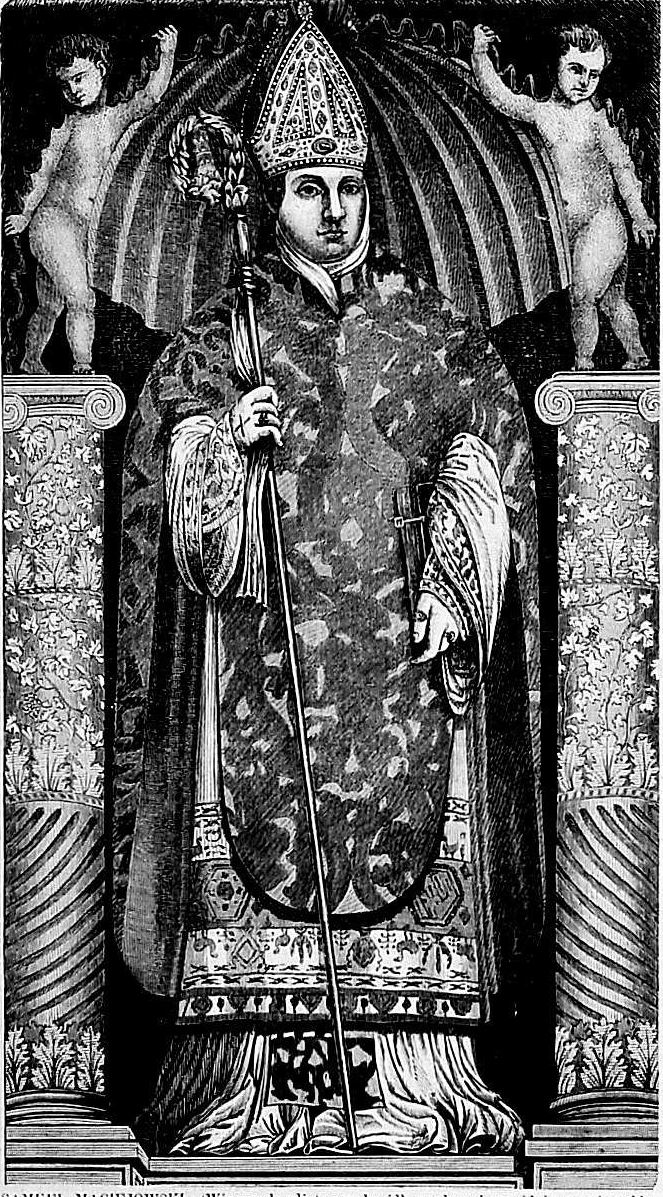
Samuel Maciejowski

Samuel Maciejowski (15 January 1499 – 26 October 1550) was a 16th-century Roman Catholic Bishop of Chełm, Płock and Kraków, in Poland.

== Early life ==
He was born 15 January 1499 and ordained a priest in 1530. He began his career in 1518 as a notary public of King Sigismund I the Old. In 1522, he went to study philosophy and rhetoric in Padua and then continued his studies in Bologna. After being ordained in 1530, became canon of Kraków.

== Episcopal career ==
He was first made Bishop of Chełm, and was then Appointed Bishop of Płock, Poland on 22 August 1541 followed by being made Bishop of Kraków, on 19 Jun 1546. He was also Secretary of the Crown.

As Bishop of Kraków, he was concerned with the level of education of the clergy, was a supporter of a soft approach with dissenters. In 1546, he ordered an inspection visit of the diocese, which in concept at least, was to limit the influence of the Reformation, but due to the mildness of his character was largely ineffectual.

He called a diocesan synod in 1547 at Wiślica but the resolution of the Synod has not been preserved.

He gathered around him scholars and poets such that the atmosphere of the cathedral was one of vigorous scientific and literary debate.

He died on 26 October 1550 and was interred in the burial chapel of Our Lady of the Snows in Wawel Cathedral near his nephew, Bernard Maciejowski also a Bishop of Kraków.

Religious titles
Preceded by Jakub Buczacki	Bishop of Płock; 1541–1546	Succeeded by Jan Bieliński
