= Andrzej Gawroński =

Andrzej Gawroński may refer to:

- Andrzej Gawroński (linguist) (1885–1927), Polish Indologist, linguist and polyglot
- Andrzej Gawroński (actor) (1935–2020), Polish film and theatre actor
- Andrzej Gawroński (bishop) (1740–1813), Jesuit clergyman and educator, bishop of Kraków
