= Gawroński =

Rawicz coat of arms, used by some of Gawroński family

Gawroński (feminine: Gawrońska, plural: Gawrońscy) is a Polish surname. It may be transliterated as: Gawronski, Gawronska, Gawronsky. Notable people with the surname include:

- Andrzej Gawroński (linguist) (1885–1927), Polish Indologist, linguist and polyglot, Professor of Jagiellonian University and Lwów University
- Andrzej Gawroński (actor) (1935–2020), Polish actor
- Andrzej Gawroński (bishop) (1740–1813), Jesuit clergyman, Bishop of Kraków
- Anna Gawrońska (born 1979), Polish footballer
- Anthony P. Gawronski (1900–1972), American lawyer and politician
- Bertram Gawronski (born 1971), German psychologist
- Jan Gawroński (1933–2023), Polish footballer
- Jas Gawronski (born 1936), Italian journalist and politician
- Luciana Frassati Gawronska (1902–2007), Italian writer and author
- Piotr Gawroński (born 1990), Polish former cyclist
- Wojciech Gawroński (born 1953), Polish slalom canoeist
