= Sołtyk coat of arms =

Polish coat of arms

Sołtyk
- Families: Sołtyk princely family

Sołtyk is a Polish coat of arms. It was used by several szlachta families in the times of the Polish–Lithuanian Commonwealth.

== Notable bearers ==
Notable bearers of this coat of arms include:

- Tomasz Sołtyk
- Kajetan Sołtyk
- Stanisław Sołtyk
- Roman Sołtyk

== See also ==
- Polish heraldry
- Heraldry
- List of Polish nobility coats of arms

== Sources ==
- Dynastic Genealogy
- Ornatowski.com
