= Zglenicki =

Zglenicki (feminine: Zglenicka; plural: Zgleniccy) is a Polish surname. Notable people with this surname include:

- Franciszek Zglenicki (1767–1841), Polish Catholic bishop
- Witold Zglenicki (1850–1904), Polish geologist
