= Franciszek Zglenicki =

Polish Catholic bishop

The Right Reverend Franciszek Zglenicki
- Auxiliary Bishop of Kraków
- See: Archdiocese of Kraków
- Appointed: 27 September 1824
- In office: 1824–1841
- Other post: Titular Bishop of Gortyna

Orders
- Ordination: 18 December 1790
- Consecration: 12 December 1824 by Jan Paweł Woronicz

Personal details
- Born: 1767
- Died: 27 January 1841 (aged 73–74) Kraków, Poland
- Denomination: Catholic Church
- Coat of arms

Franciszek Ksawery Zglenicki (1767 – 27 January 1841) was a Polish Catholic bishop who served as auxiliary bishop of the Diocese of Kraków, and archdeacon of the cathedral chapter in Kraków.

He joined the General Confederation of the Kingdom of Poland in 1812. On 12 December 1824 he was consecrated a bishop by Jan Paweł Woronicz. He then became the apostolic administrator of the Diocese of Kraków, in Woronicz's absence.

He became an auxiliary bishop to Karol Skórkowski, the Bishop of Kraków, and on 18 January 1836 began managing the diocese after the bishop left.

On 14 August 1836 he was consecrated in the church in Proszowice. He served as a priest in the Church of St. Sczcepan in Kraków.

He recognized the relics of Saint Bronislava, and presided over he rbeatification ceremonies, which took place on 3 September 1840.
