= Feliks Turski =

Bishop of Kraków

Feliks Paweł Turski
- Bishop of Krakow
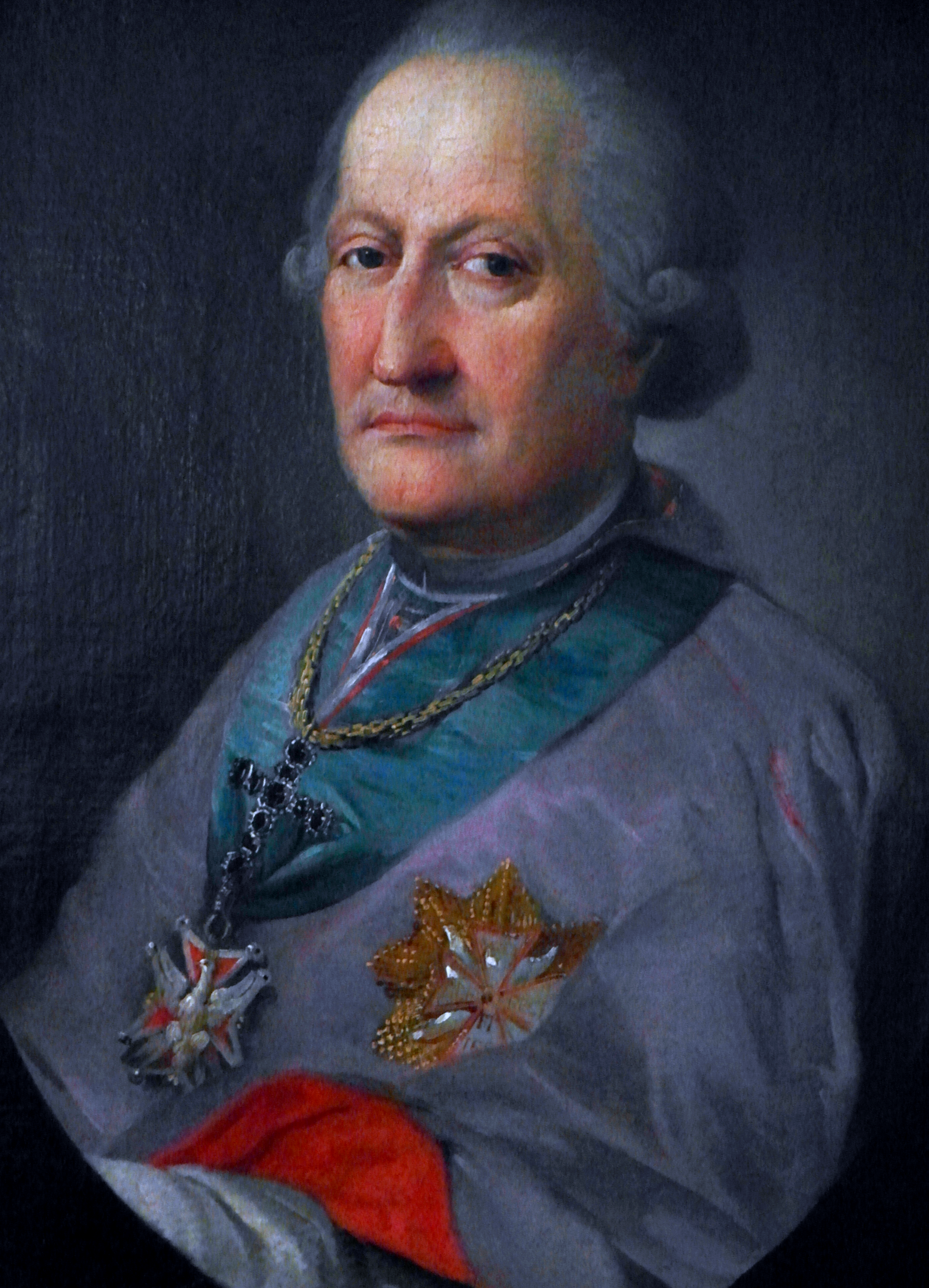
- Wearing the Order of the White Eagle
- Predecessor: Kajetan Sołtyk
- Successor: Andrzej Gawroński
- Previous posts: Crown Tribunal, Bishop of Chełm, Bishop of Łuck

Personal details
- Born: 1729
- Died: 1800 (aged 70–71)
- Denomination: Catholic Church
- Coat of arms

Feliks Paweł Turski (1729–1800) was a Polish clergyman who was Bishop of Kraków from 1790 to 1800.

Turski was born in 1729 to the nobility. He studied theology in Rome. In 1764, he was elected president of the Crown Tribunal. In the following years, he became Bishop of Chełm and Bishop of Łuck. As Bishop of Chełm, he functioned as a buffer to Nikolai Vasilyevich Repnin's political influence. As Bishop of Łuck, he approved the foundation of a seminary for the Vincentians in 1771.

In July 1789, King Poniatowski asked Turski to accept the bishopric of Kraków. In the fall of that year, the estates of the bishopric were divided, and the total estate income of the bishopric was capped at 100,000 złotys. It was then expected that the new bishop would select the new estates of the bishopric while adhering to this new income maximum. Turski initially wavered, but he became bishop in 1790.

Turski died in 1800.

== Legacy ==
Turski appears in Constitution of 3 May 1791, a painting by Jan Matejko.

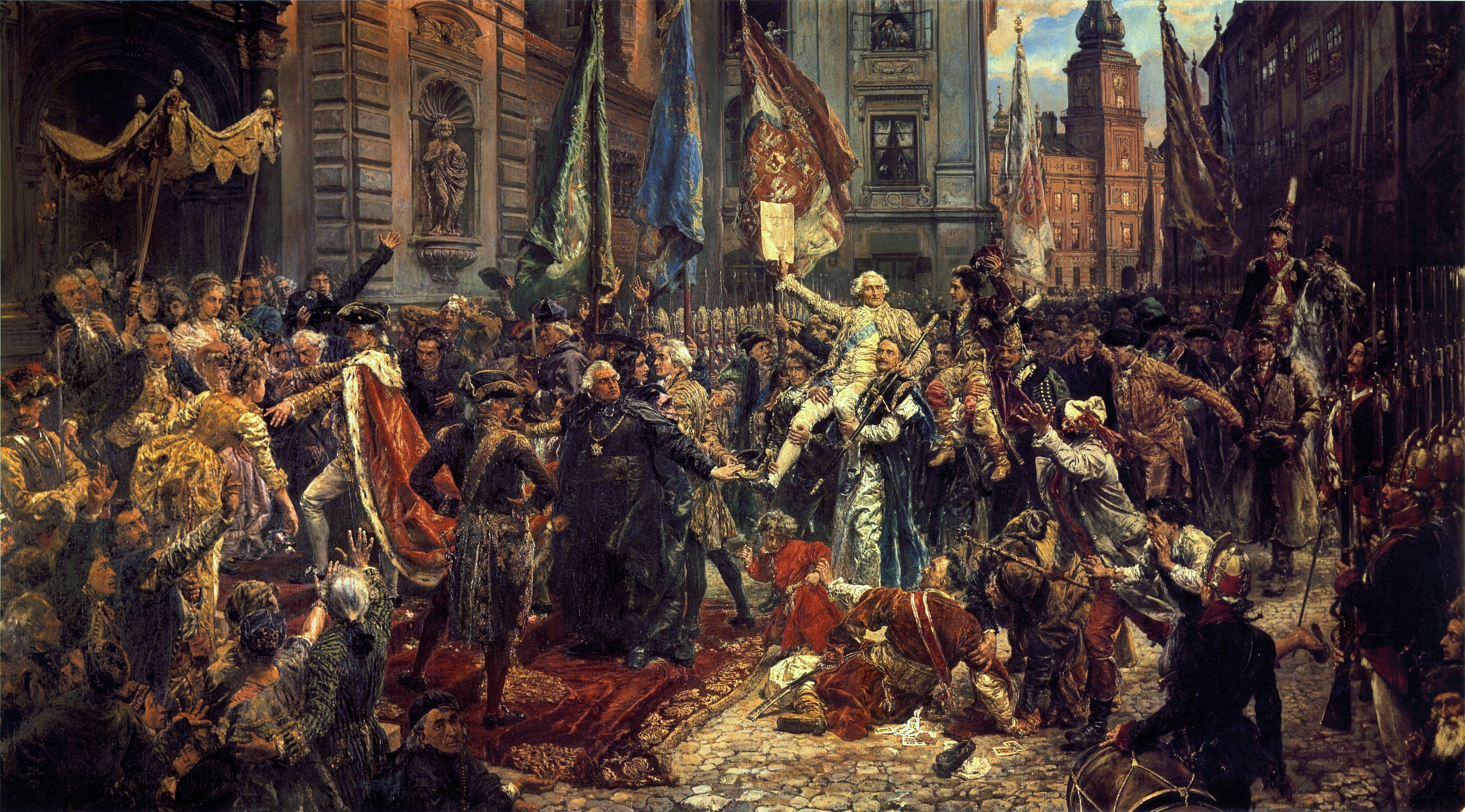
Left of center, wearing a purple mitre

Catholic Church titles
Preceded by Kajetan Sołtyk	Bishop of Kraków; 1790–1800	Succeeded by Andrzej Gawroński
