= Włostowice, Puławy =

Coordinates: 51°23′39″N 21°58′38″E

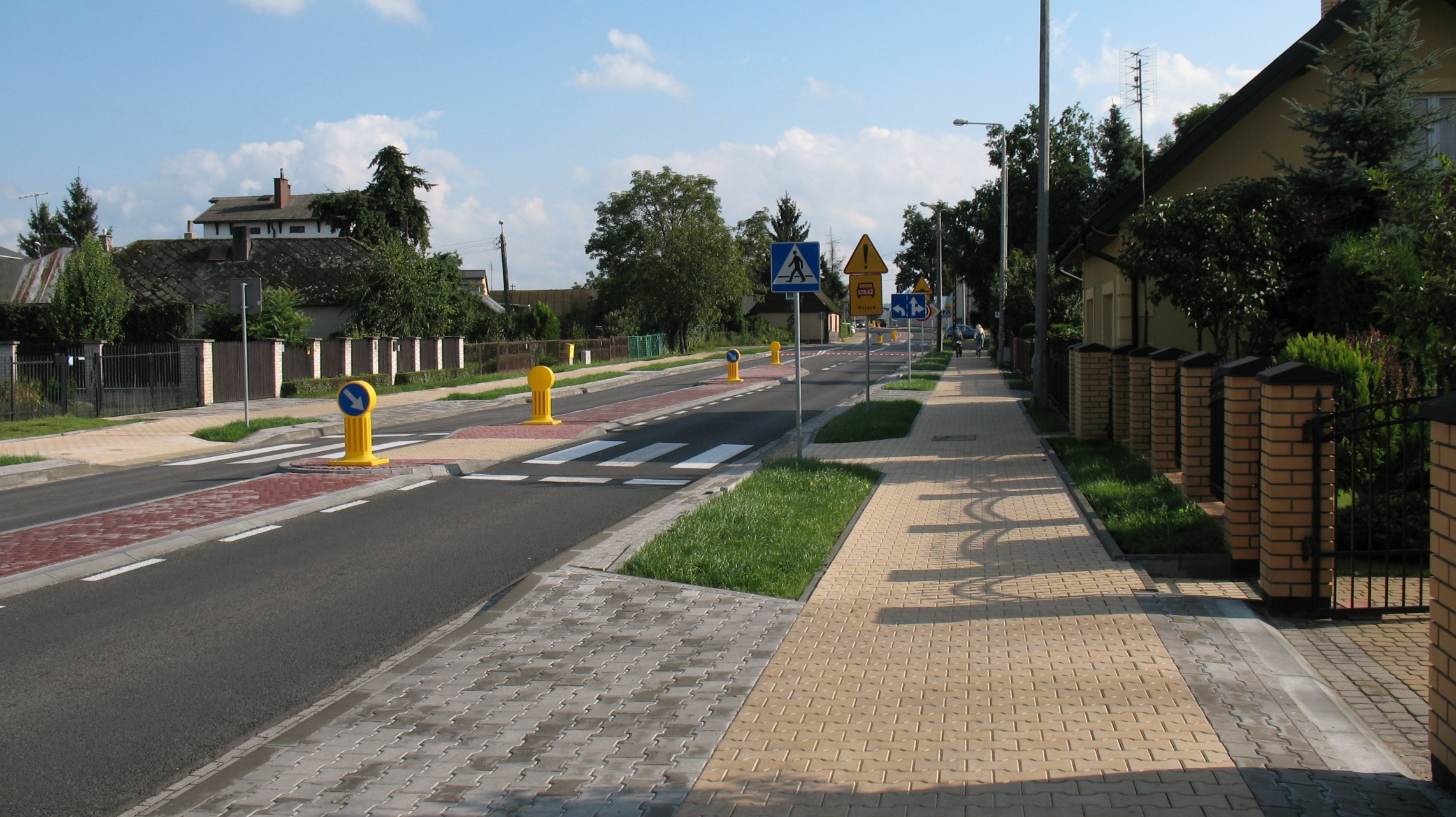
A street in Włostowice

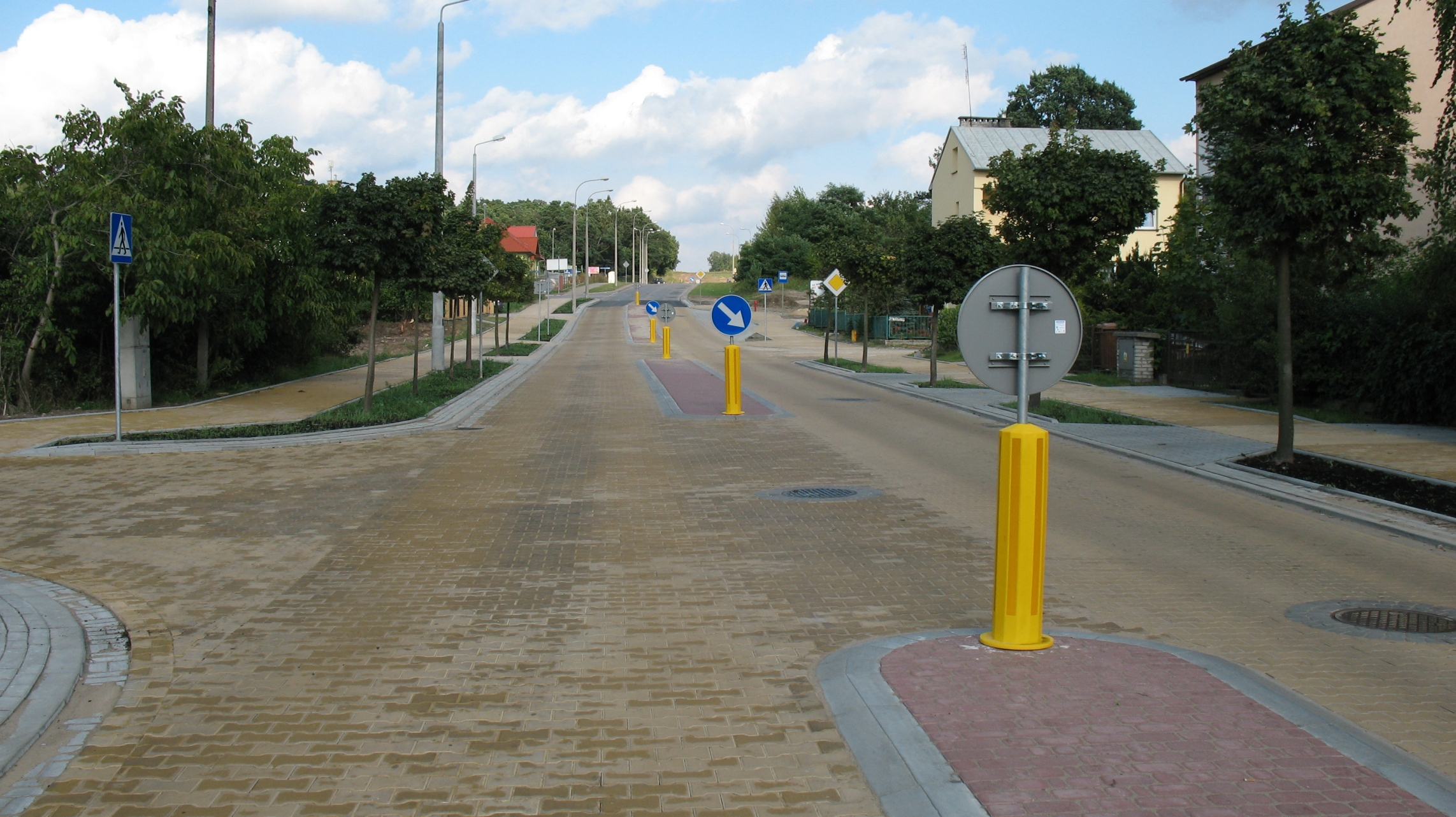
Kaznowskiego Street, Włostowice

Włostowice is a residential southern suburb of the town of Puławy in eastern Poland, with approximately 5,000 inhabitants. Its housing stock is mainly private homes except for Romska Street, which has four blocks of flats.

== History ==
In 2009, the Dutchtown highway project was completed, which enhanced safety.

== Attractions ==
Attractions in Włostowice are:

- St. Joseph's Church: This baroque church was founded in 1728 by Elżbieta Sieniawska. The church wall is decorated with plates commemorating those buried in its churchyard.
- Włostowice Cemetery: Founded in the late 18th century by Prince A. K. Czartoryski, it is one of the oldest Polish cemeteries. It contains Roman Catholic, Evangelic-Augsburg and Orthodox graves, as well as monuments of the region's nobility.
