= Irena Stankiewicz =

Polish graphic artist (born 1925)

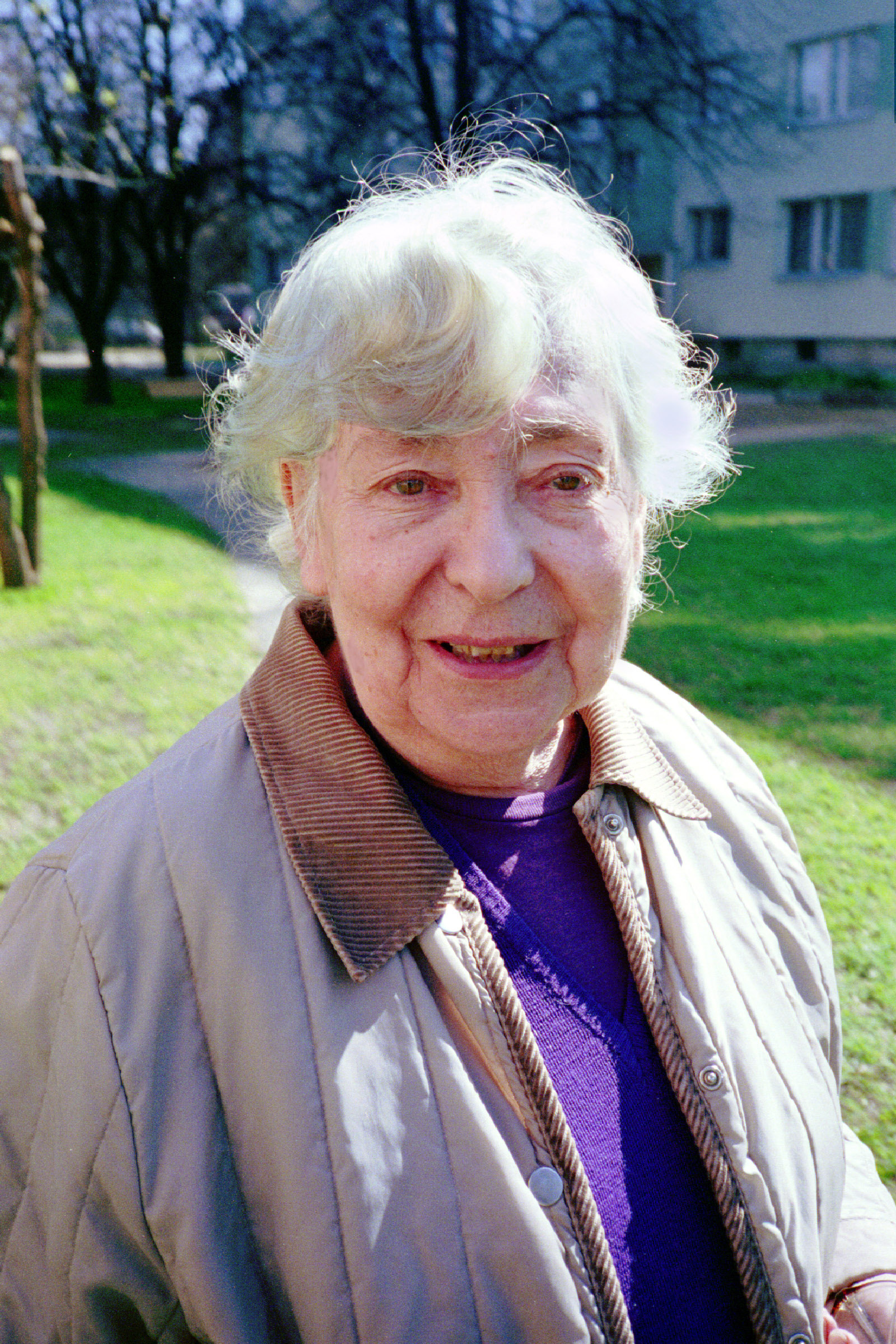
Irena Stankiewicz (2000)

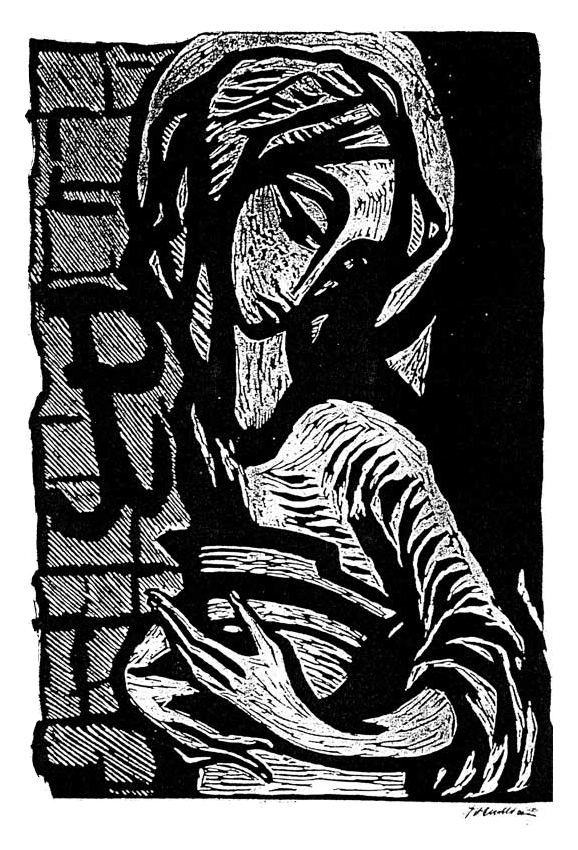
The Virgin Mary of the Home Army soldiers 1981

Irena Stankiewicz (February 28, 1925 in Puławy) is a Polish graphic artist.

She was born as the daughter of the captain of combat engineers Aleksander Stankiewicz (1899–1930) and Stanisława Piszczkowska (1899–1979). She and her family moved to Warsaw. After the death of her father when she was six years old, Irene lived in the village Korytnica in the Węgrów district with her relative Maria Holder-Eggerowa, owner of Korytnica property, but her mother remained in Warsaw. In Korytnica she attended the primary school, and from 1938 she moved to the Sisters of Nazareth High School in Warsaw. The period of the Second World War she spent in Korytnica, continuing her studies and participating in the underground Polish Home Army. In 2009, she was elected an honorary citizen of Korytnica parish.

After the war she began her studies at the School of Fine Arts in Warsaw, and then studied at the Graphics Department of the Warsaw Academy of Fine Arts, graduating in 1953. She worked in the years 1952 to 1960 with the “Czytelnik” publishing house, and since 1970 with the "Nasza Księgarnia". Since 1958 she was employed as a lecturer at her Academy.

She became winner of many awards. Irena Stankiewicz deals mainly with woodcuts and linocuts.

As the most important work of Irena Stankiewicz is considered the woodcut “Matka Boska Akowska” (The Virgin Mary of the Home Army soldiers) which earned 1981 the first prize in London art competition "Home Army in art". This woodcut image has been repeated many times in the form of metalwork and stained glass windows throughout the country.
