= Puławy =

City in Lublin Voivodeship, Poland

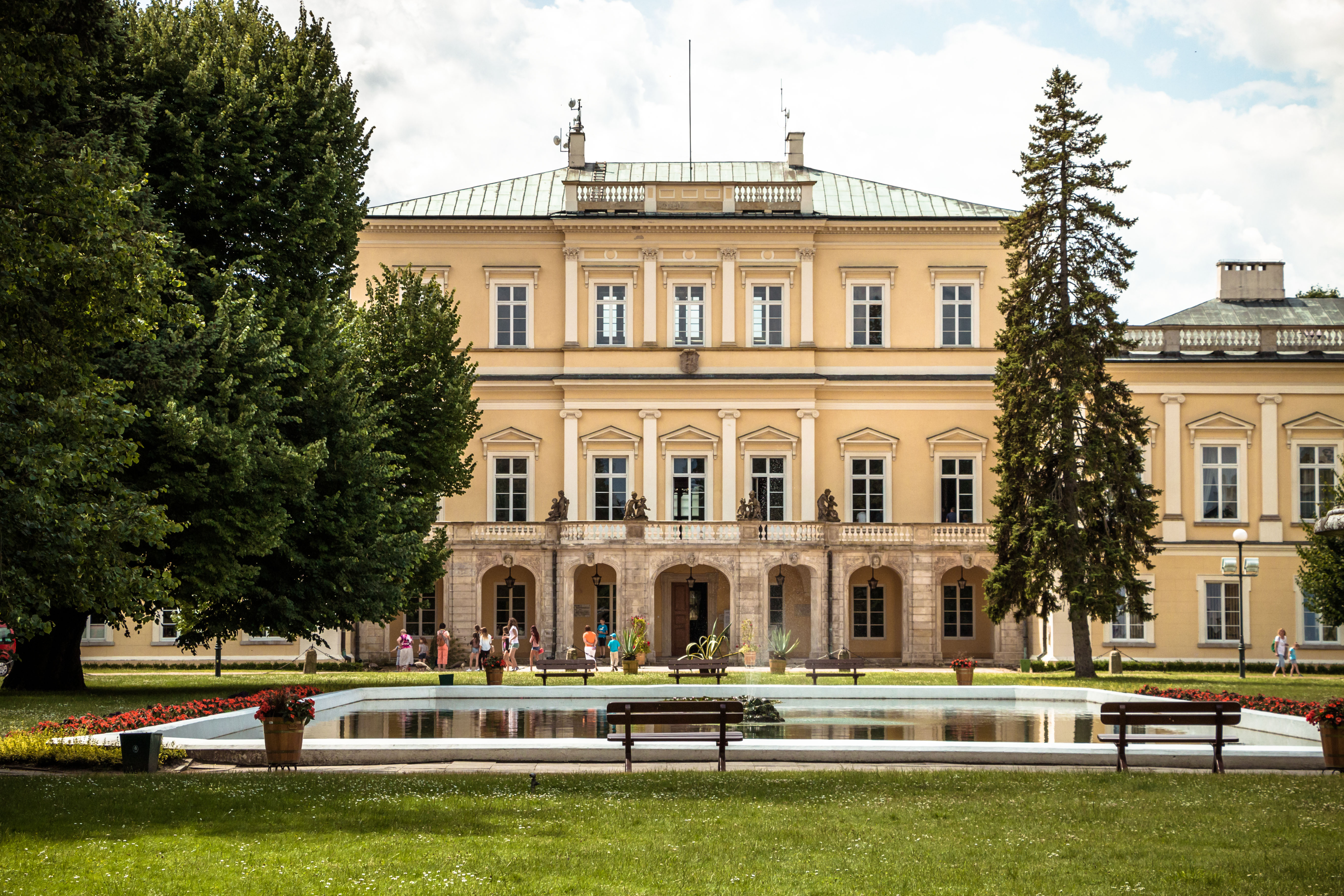
- Czartoryski Palace

- Flag Coat of arms
- Interactive map of Puławy
- Location within Poland
- Coordinates: 51°25′N 21°58′E
- Country: Poland
- Voivodeship: Lublin
- County: Puławy
- Gmina: Puławy (urban gmina)
- First mentioned: 1489
- City rights: 1906

Government
  - City Mayor: Paweł Maj (Ind.)

Area
  - Total: 50.49 km^{2} (19.49 sq mi)
- Elevation: 115 m (377 ft)

Population (2019)
  - Total: 47,417
  - Density: 939.1/km^{2} (2,432/sq mi)
- Time zone: UTC+1 (CET)
  - Summer (DST): UTC+2 (CEST)
- Postal code: 24-100 to 24-112
- Area code: +48 81
- Car plates: LPU
- Website: www.pulawy.eu

Puławy (pronounced [puˈwavɨ], also written Pulawy) is a city in eastern Poland, in Lesser Poland's Lublin Voivodeship, at the confluence of the Vistula and Kurówka Rivers. Puławy is the capital of Puławy County. The city's 2019 population was estimated at 47,417. Its coat of arms is based on Pogonia.

Puławy was first mentioned in documents of the 15th century. At that time it was spelled Pollavy, its name probably coming from a Vistula River ford located nearby. The town is a local center of science, industry and tourism, together with nearby Nałęczów and Kazimierz Dolny. Puławy is home to Poland's first permanent museum and is a Vistula River port.

The town has two bridges and four rail stations, and serves as a road junction. Nearby Dęblin has a military airport.

== Location and transport ==
Puławy lies in the western part of Lublin Voivodeship, at the edge of the picturesque Lesser Polish Gorge of the Vistula, and near the easternmost point of the Vistula river. Historically the town belongs to Lesser Poland, and geographically, it lies at the border of Mazovian Lowland and Lublin Upland. The area of the town is 50.49 square kilometres (19.49 sq mi). Puławy is located on Polish Expressway S12 (highway), and the intersection of the S17 and S12 highways is located nearby, east of the city. Furthermore, the town has four rail stations (Puławy, Puławy Azoty, Puławy Chemia and Puławy Miasto). Long-distance rail transport is served by the Puławy Miasto station, with connections to all Polish cities.

== History ==
The history of Puławy dates back to the 15th century when a settlement near a Vistula river ford was established. In the late 17th century it emerged as the location of a rural residence of the Lubomirski and the Sieniawski noble families and in 1676–1679, Prince Stanisław Herakliusz Lubomirski built a summer palace, now known as the Pałac Czartoryskich or the Czartoryskich Palace. In 1687, Lubomirski's daughter Elżbieta (who was called the uncrowned Queen of Poland), married Adam Mikołaj Sieniawski, bringing Puławy her dowry. In 1706, during the Great Northern War, the settlement together with the castle were destroyed by Swedish soldiers as Elżbieta was a supporter of King Augustus II the Strong.

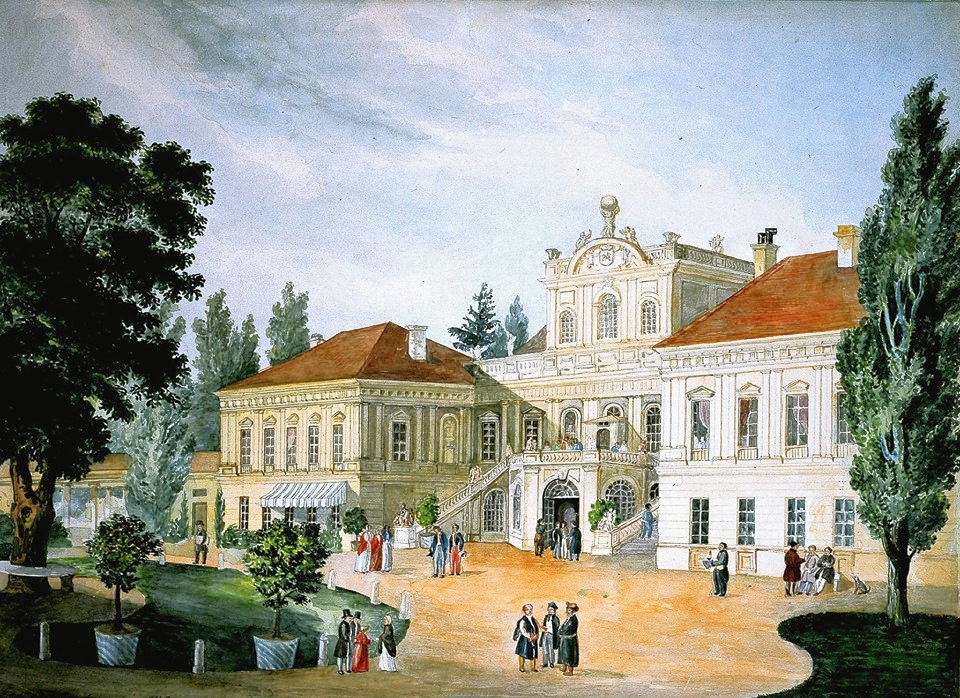
Czartoryski residence in Puławy, B. Czernow, 1842

In 1731, Maria Zofia Sieniawska (the daughter of Elżbieta and Adam Sieniawski), married August Aleksander Czartoryski. As a result, Puławy remained in the hands of the Czartoryski family for the next 100 years. The settlement prospered, and in 1784 it became the property of Prince Adam Kazimierz Czartoryski and his wife Izabela Czartoryska, née Fleming. Under their stewardship, and after the loss of Poland's independence in 1795 (see Partitions of Poland) the palace became a museum of Polish national memorabilia and a major cultural and political centre. In 1784 Adam and Izabela moved permanently into the palace, and soon afterwards Puławy became known as Polish Athens. All major cultural figures of the late 18th century Poland visited the palace. Among them were Grzegorz Piramowicz, Franciszek Dionizy Kniaźnin, Julian Ursyn Niemcewicz, Adam Naruszewicz, Jan Paweł Woronicz, Franciszek Karpiński, Franciszek Zabłocki, Jan Piotr Norblin, Marcello Bacciarelli. In 1794, during the Kościuszko Uprising, Puławy was plundered and burned by the Russians as punishment for the Czartoryski family's support of the rebels. The reconstruction of the palace was initiated in 1796 by Princess Izabela who employed the renowned architect Chrystian Piotr Aigner. In 1801, the Princess opened the first museum in Poland in the Temple of the Sibyl in Puławy.

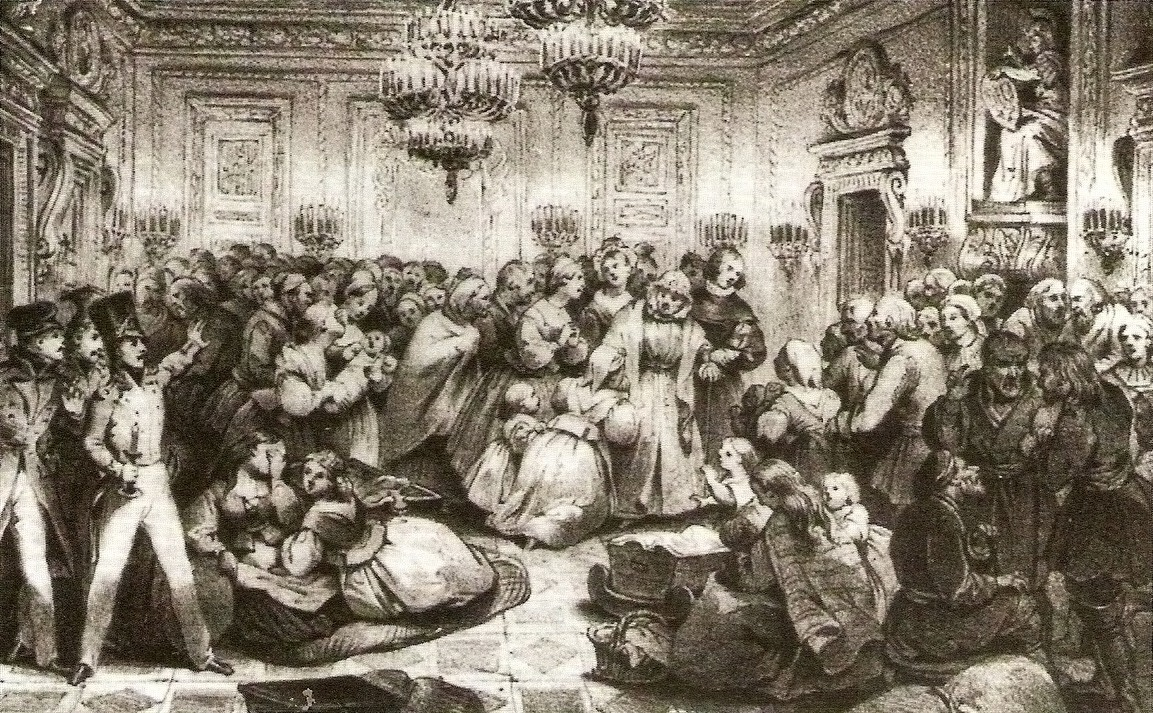
Princess Izabela Czartoryska leaves Puławy during the November 1831 Uprising (1833 lithograph)

The end of Puławy's Golden Age was marked by the November Uprising (1830–31), when after its suppression, the estate was taken over by the Russian government. The museum collections that were saved later became the nucleus of the present Czartoryski Museum in Kraków. In the 1830s, the Czartoryski family was forced to leave Russian-controlled Congress Poland (see Great Emigration), and Puławy was reduced into a small, provincial village. In 1842, to further erase traces of Polish culture, the Russians renamed Puławy to Nowa Aleksandria. In 1869, an Agricultural and Forestry Institute was founded here. One of its first students was the future Polish writer Bolesław Prus (who had also spent part of his early childhood in Puławy). Prus would set his 1884 micro-story, "Mold of the Earth," at the Temple of the Sibyl.

=== 20th century ===
Puławy received its town charter in 1906. In 1915, it was seized by the Austro-Hungarian Army, which remained until November 1918. On 13 August 1920, Józef Piłsudski, Poland's Chief of State, left Warsaw, and established a military headquarters in Puławy. The Soviet Union's Red Army held most of eastern Poland and was besieging Warsaw, (see Polish–Soviet War). Piłsudski's radio-monitoring, cryptological and intelligence services detected a gap in the Soviet flanks in the Puławy region, and he ordered a concentration of Polish forces in the surrounding area around the Wieprz River. On 18 August 1920, the Polish Army launched a counter-attack from Puławy that encircled and defeated a 177,000-strong Soviet force. The attack drove the Red Army from Poland and established Poland's security for two decades, until the German invasion of 1939.

In the Second Polish Republic, Puławy began a slow process of modernization. In 1934, the town significantly grew in size, after several local villages merged with it. Furthermore, in the late 1930s Puławy took advantage of the Central Industrial Area.

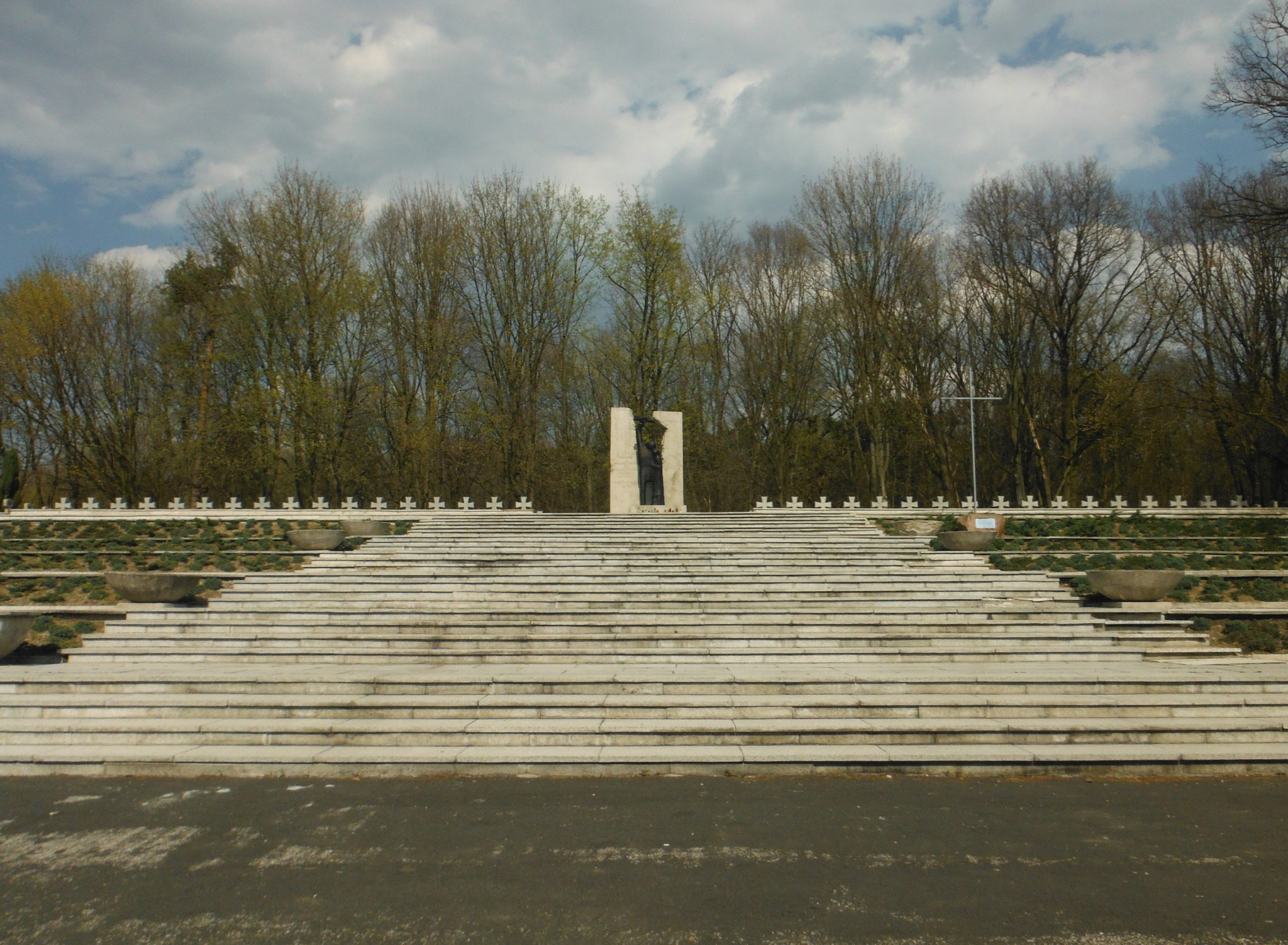
Monument to the fallen and murdered in World War II

In September 1939, during the joint German-Soviet invasion of Poland, which started World War II, Puławy was seized by the Wehrmacht, and afterwards was occupied by Germany. Three German concentration camps operated around Puławy. In 1940 the Germans carried out mass arrests of local Polish intelligentsia, which was then imprisoned in Lublin, and then often deported to concentration camps or murdered in Rury, Lublin. During the occupation, Polish poet Krystyna Krahelska lived in the city from 1940 to 1942 and was part of the Polish underground resistance movement. She is best known as the author of the most popular song of the Polish resistance movement (Hej chłopcy, bagnet na broń), which she premiered in 1943 in Warsaw, where she was killed in the Warsaw Uprising in 1944. The town's Jewish population of some 3,600 was first confined to a ghetto, then murdered at the Sobibór camp. The Jewish population ceased to exist and was never reconstituted. The town remained under German occupation until July 25, 1944, when it was freed by the Home Army, as well as the Red Army.

A year later, on April 24, 1945, a local unit of the anti-Communist organization Freedom and Independence under Marian Bernaciak captured the local office of Communist secret services temporarily.

The postwar history of Puławy has been dominated by the 1960 decision of the government of People's Republic of Poland to build a large chemical plant north of the town (Zakłady Azotowe Puławy). It was opened in 1966 and produced nitrate fertilizer. As a result, in the 1960s and 1970s Pulawy quickly grew in size, with new districts built for the influx of workers. Recently the plant has become the world's largest producer of melamine. In 1980 and 1981, Zakłady Azotowe Puławy was one of the largest centers of the Solidarity movement in the Lublin Region. After the declaration of Martial law in Poland (December 13, 1981), strike action was initiated in the plant, which was put down by force by the ZOMO on Dec. 19, and 20 people were arrested.

== Points of interest ==
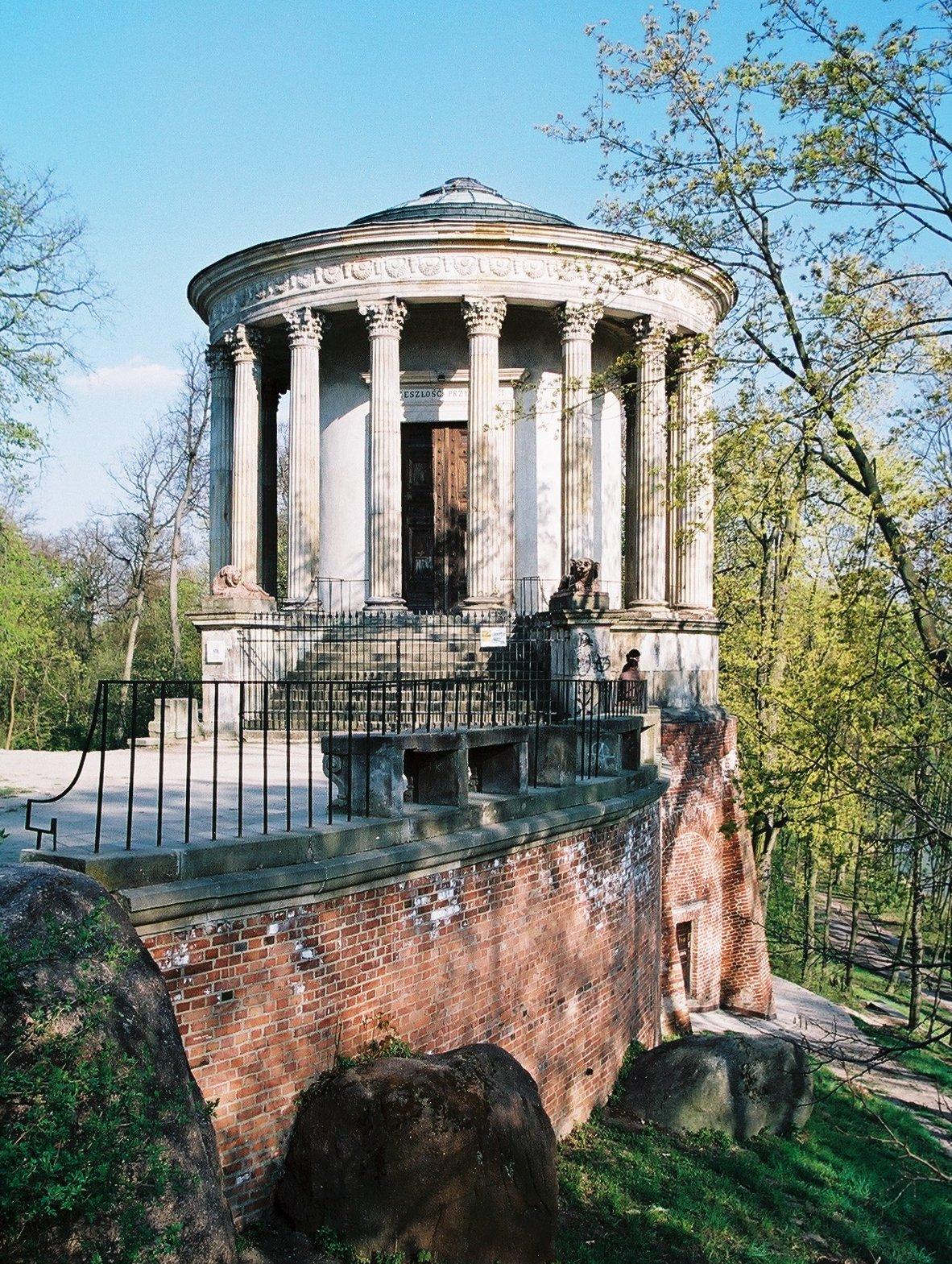
Temple of the Sibyl

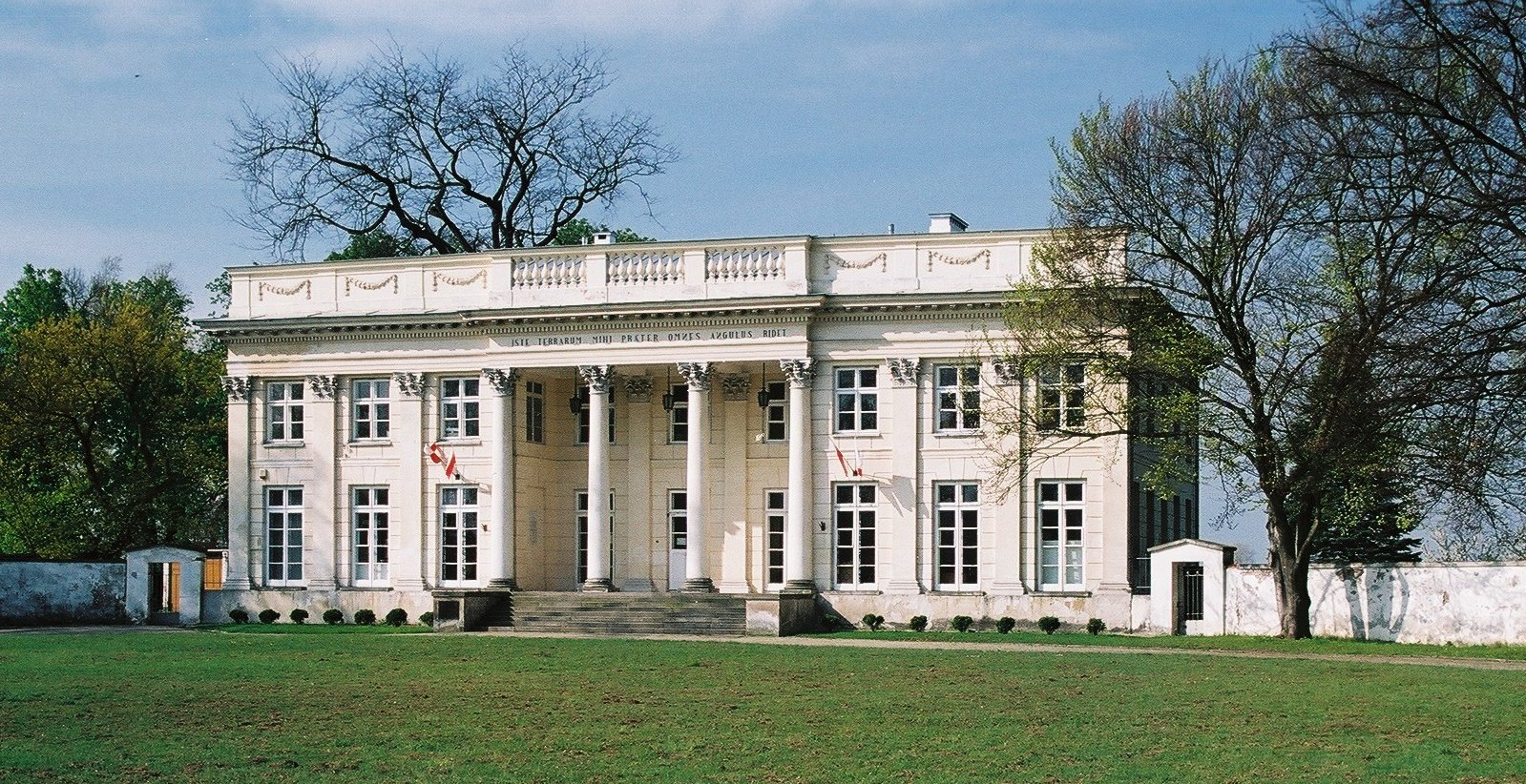
Marynka's Palace

The most notable landmark in Puławy is the Baroque-Classicist Czartoryski Palace, dating from 1676–1679 (architect Tylman van Gameren), burned in 1706, remodeled 1722–36, and again by Chrystian Piotr Aigner ca. 1800. The palace is surrounded by a 30-hectare park, in 1798-1806 fashioned into an English landscape garden, which includes classicist park pavilions dating from the early 19th century. One, the colonnaded round Temple of the Sibyl, is the setting of Bolesław Prus' striking 1884 micro-story, "Mold of the Earth."

Near the Temple of the Sibyl is the "Gothic House", built between 1800 and 1809 to commemorate Prince Józef Poniatowski’s visit to Puławy; it now houses the Regional Museum. Other palace buildings house the Soil and Fertilizer Institute.

Additional interesting buildings within the park include:

- Church of the Assumption of the Blessed Virgin Mary (1800–03) by Chrystian Piotr Aigner, styled after the Pantheon, Rome, originally - Czartoryskis' Chapel. It is actually located outside the park.
- Marynka"s Palace (1790–94), built for Maria Wirtemberska,
- Roman Gate, built in 1829 as a permanent ruin, styled after the Arch of Titus,
- Greek House (1778–1791), currently a public library,
- Yellow House, in which Tsar Alexander II of Russia stayed,
- Chinese Arbor,
- marble sarcophagus, brought from Rome in 1799 by Adam Jerzy Czartoryski,
- a 1790 sculpture of Clorinda and Tancred (see Jerusalem Delivered).

The town of Puławy itself features some interesting buildings, including a former town hall, former Orthodox church, and historic inn.

== Science ==
Since the mid-19th century, Puławy has been a center of higher education. Institutions operating here are:

- a local branch of Maria Curie-Skłodowska University in Lublin,
- Institute of Soil Science and Plant Cultivation, opened in 1950, and based on an earlier school from 1917,
- National Veterinary Research Institute, opened in 1945,
- Military Institute of Hygiene and Epidemiology,
- Research Institute of Pomology and Floriculture, Division of Apiculture,
- Fertilizer Research Institute, moved in 1968 from Tarnów,
- Development Department at the Institute of Fundamental Technological of the Polish Academy of Sciences, since 1993 called Echo-Son SA.

Since 2008, local institutes, together with Town Council and the Kazimierz Pułaski University of Technology and Humanities in Radom have been working on a modern scientific campus, which will be located in the district of Azoty. Among others, the complex will host four departments of the Radom University of Technology.

== Sports ==
Puławy has several sports clubs, with the most famous ones being Wisła Puławy (football, swimming, track and field, weight lifting), and KS Azoty-Puławy handball team which plays in the Polish Superliga, the country's top division, finishing 3rd in 2015, 2016, 2017 and 2018.

== Gallery ==
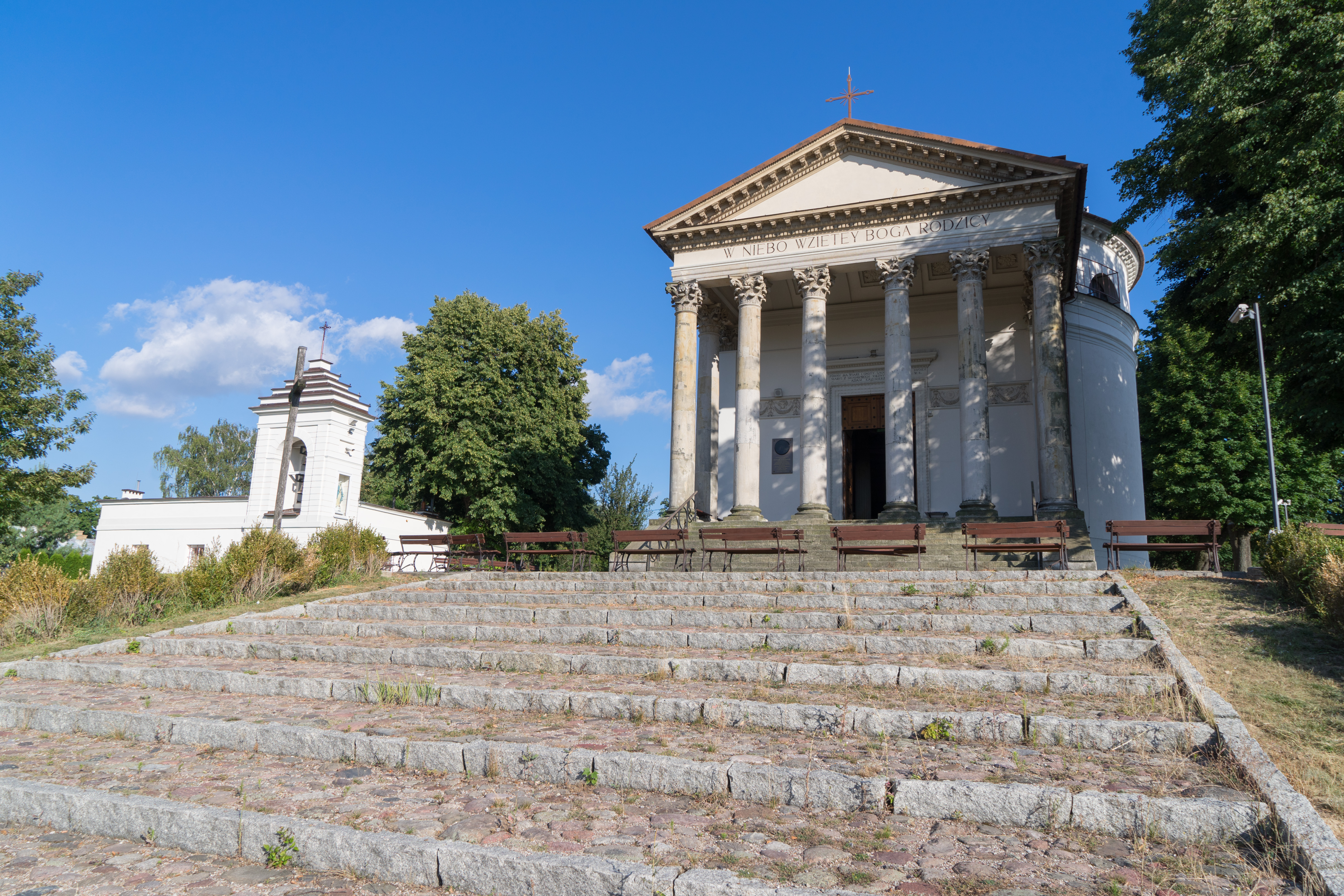
Church of the Assumption

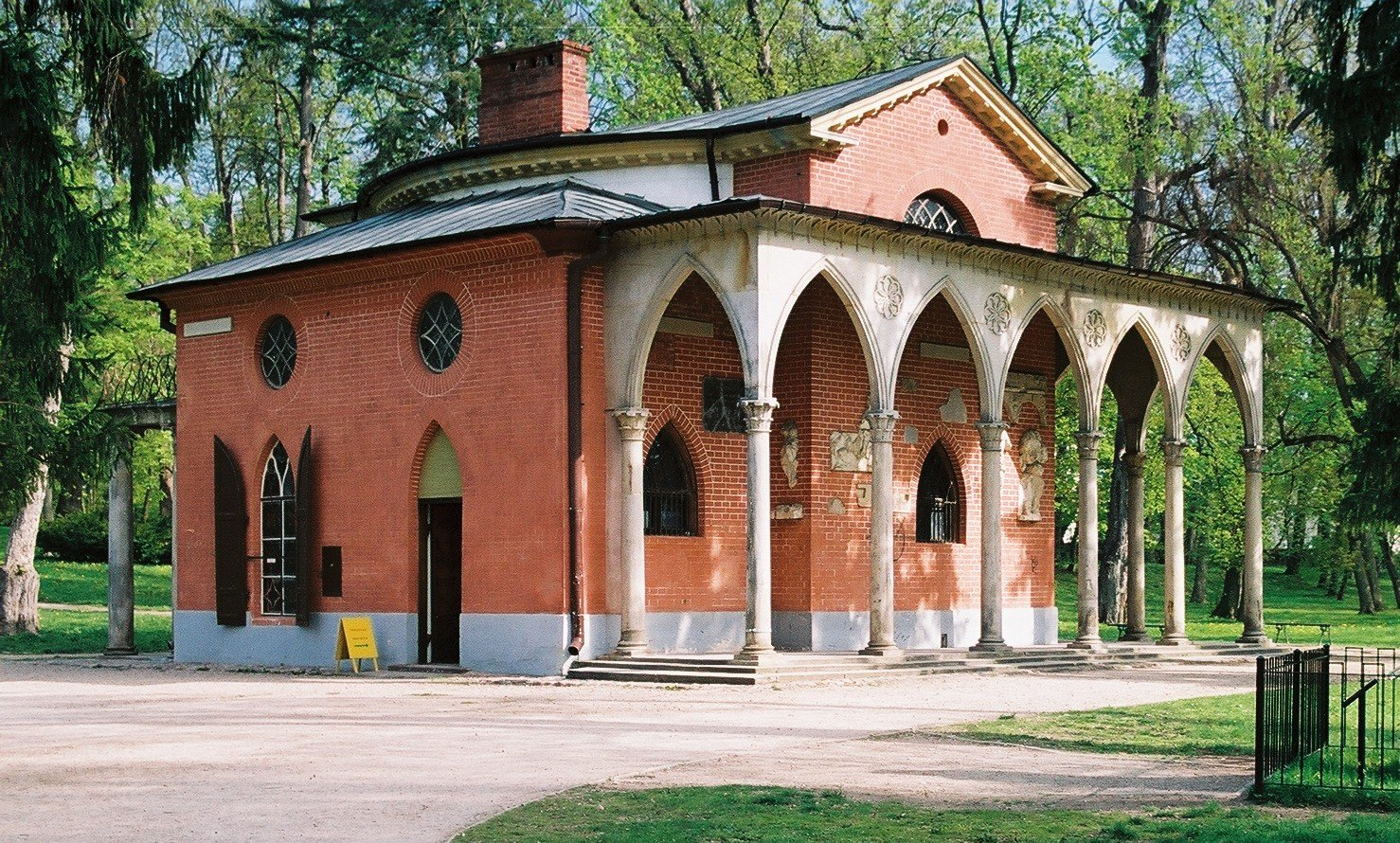
Gothic House

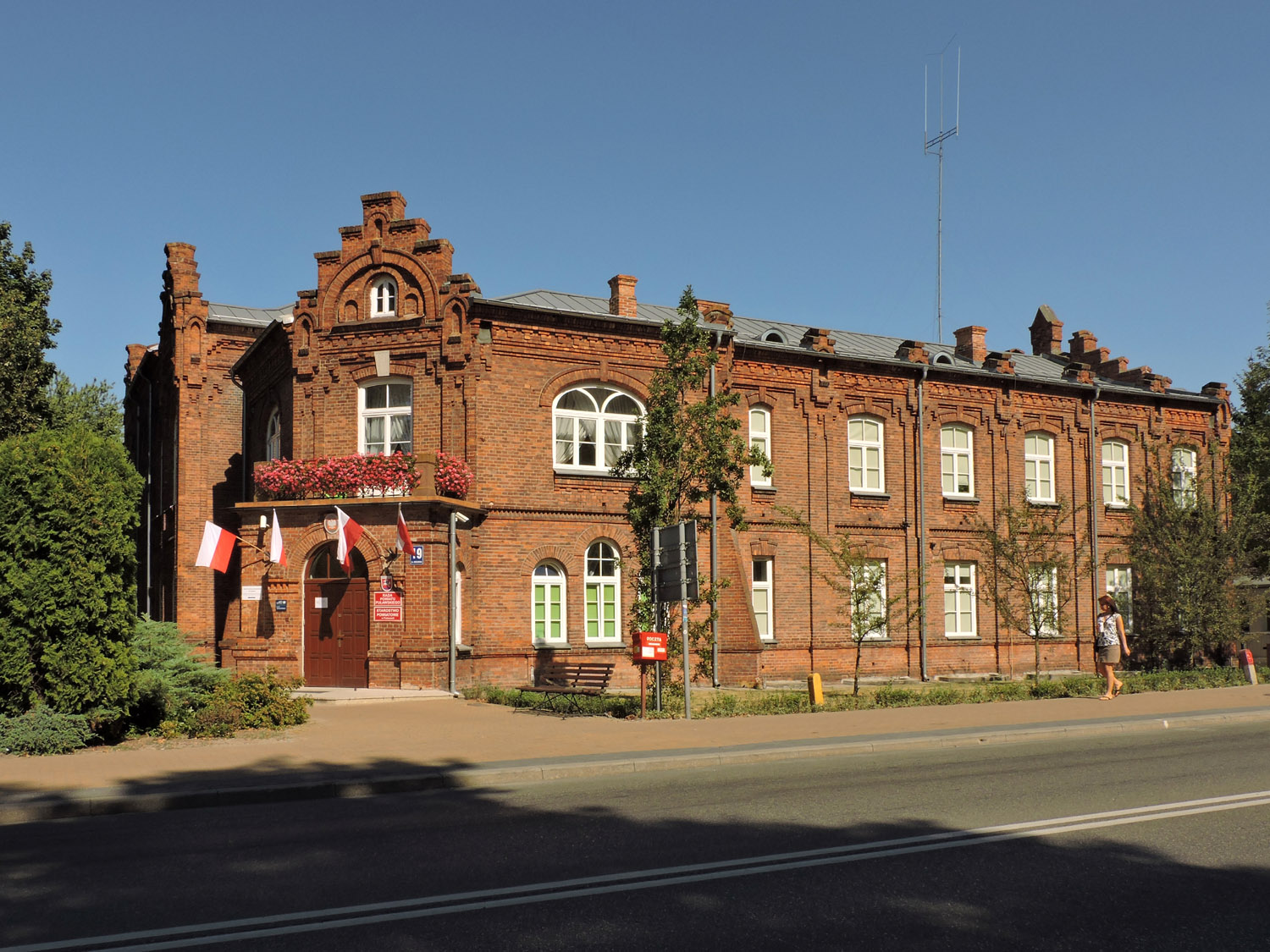
County offices

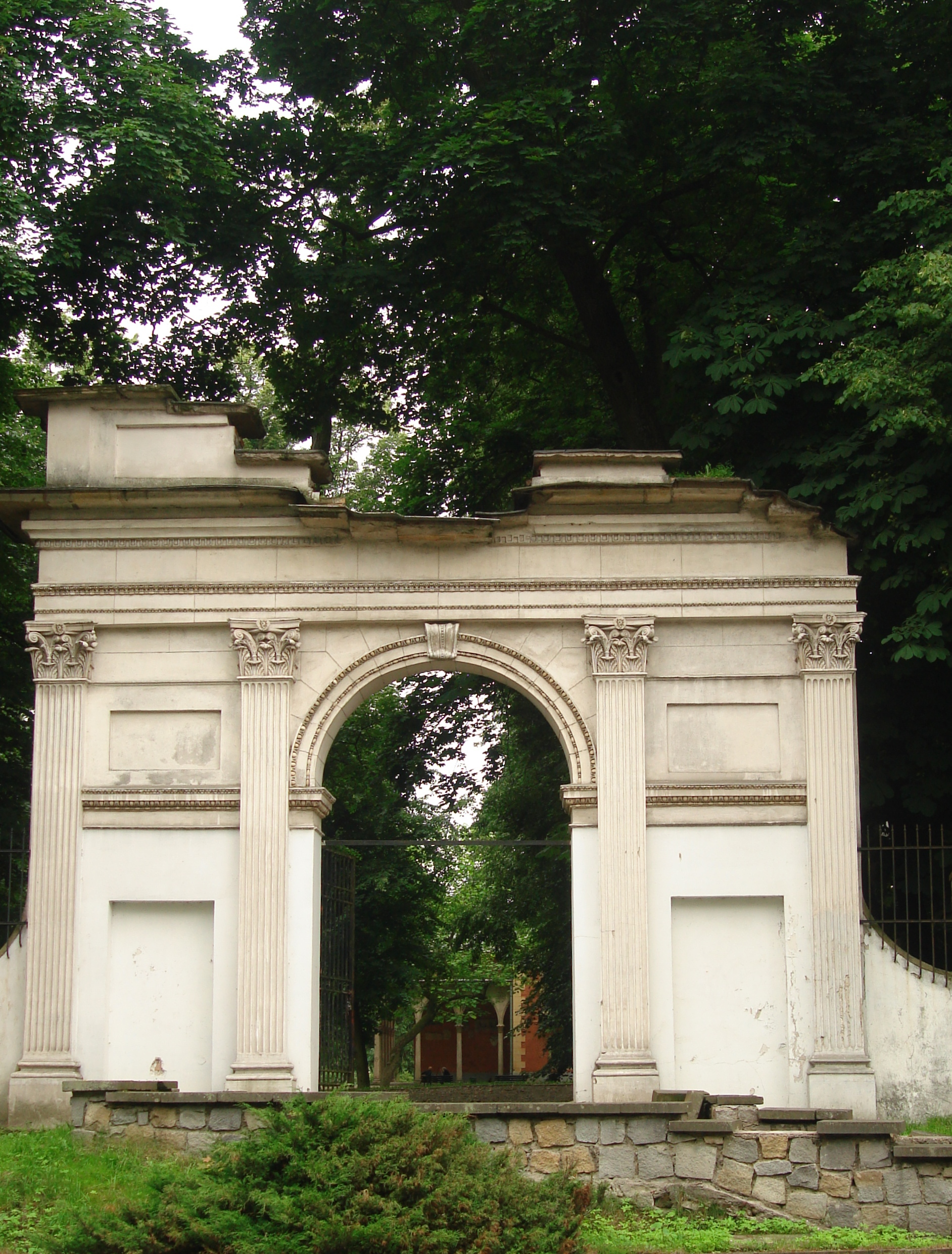
Roman Gate

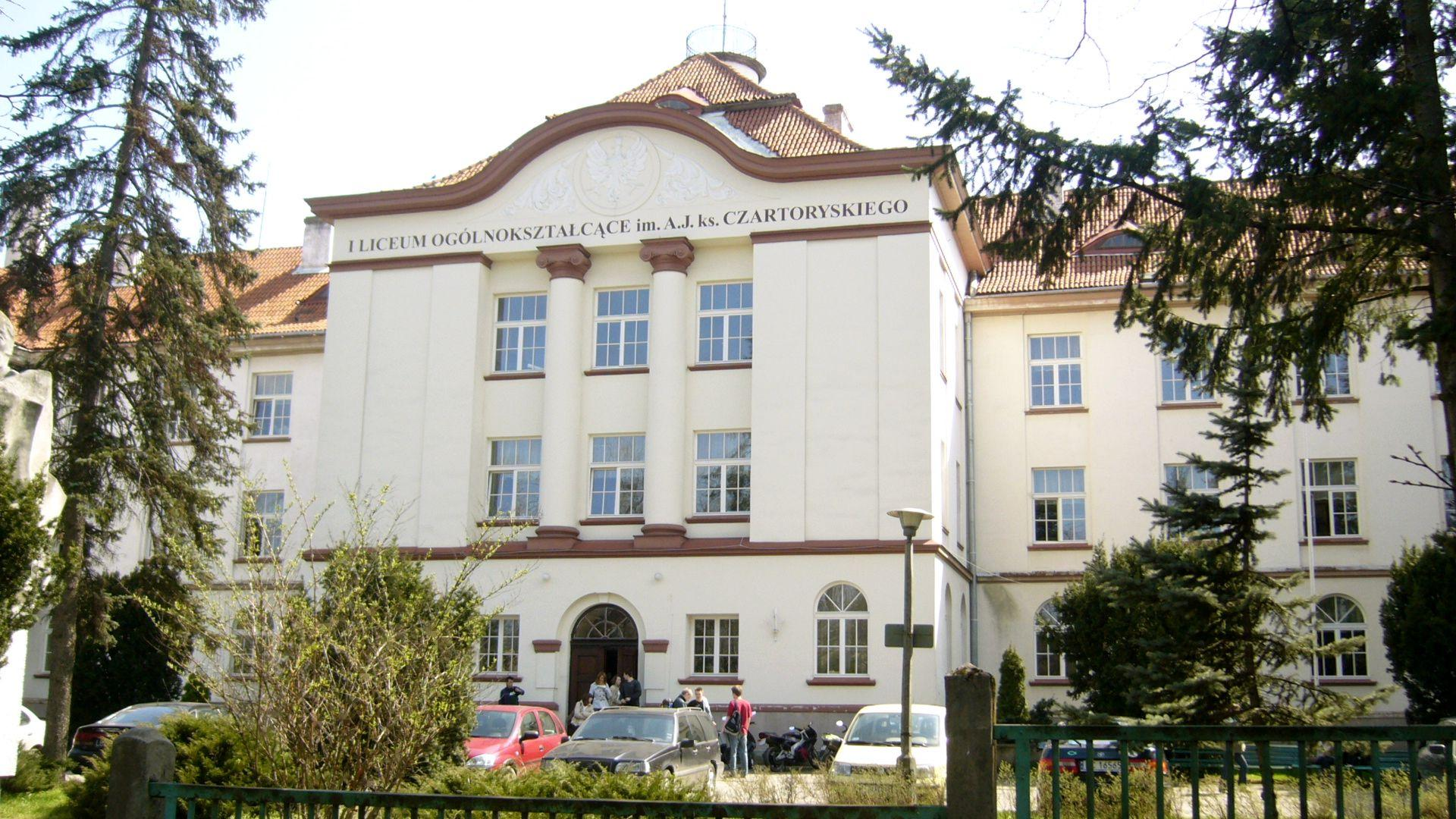
Prince Adam Jerzy Czartoryski Lyceum (secondary school)

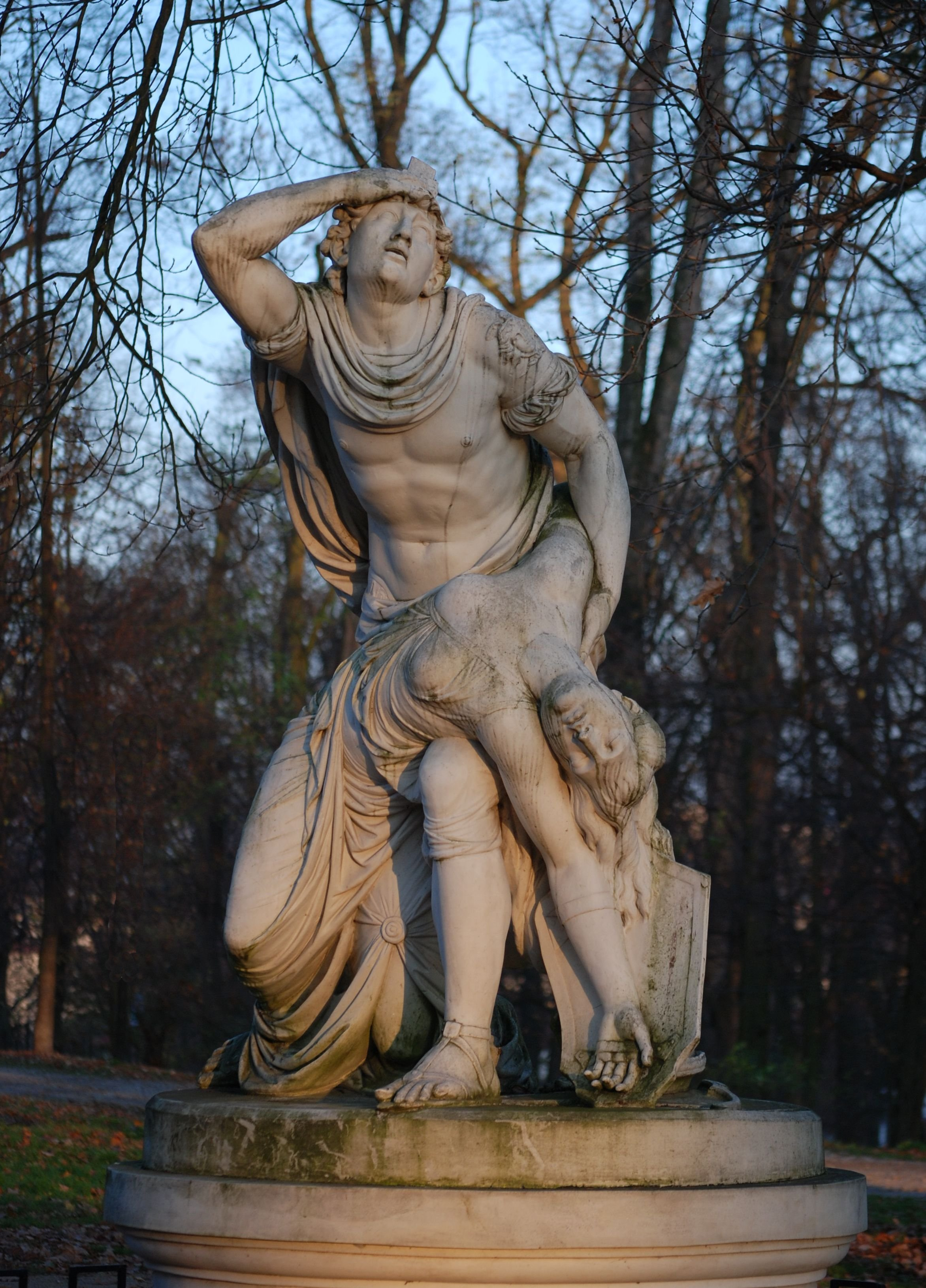
Sculpture of Tancred and Clorinda

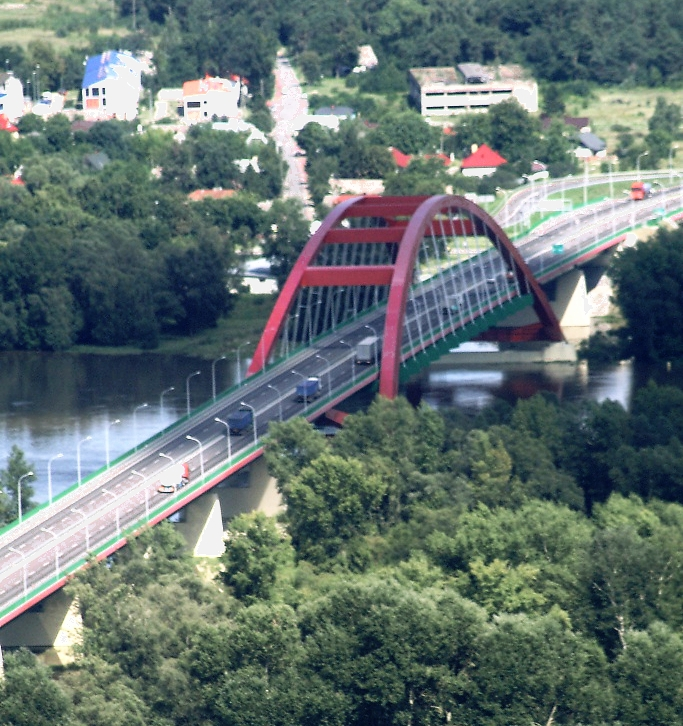
John Paul II Bridge

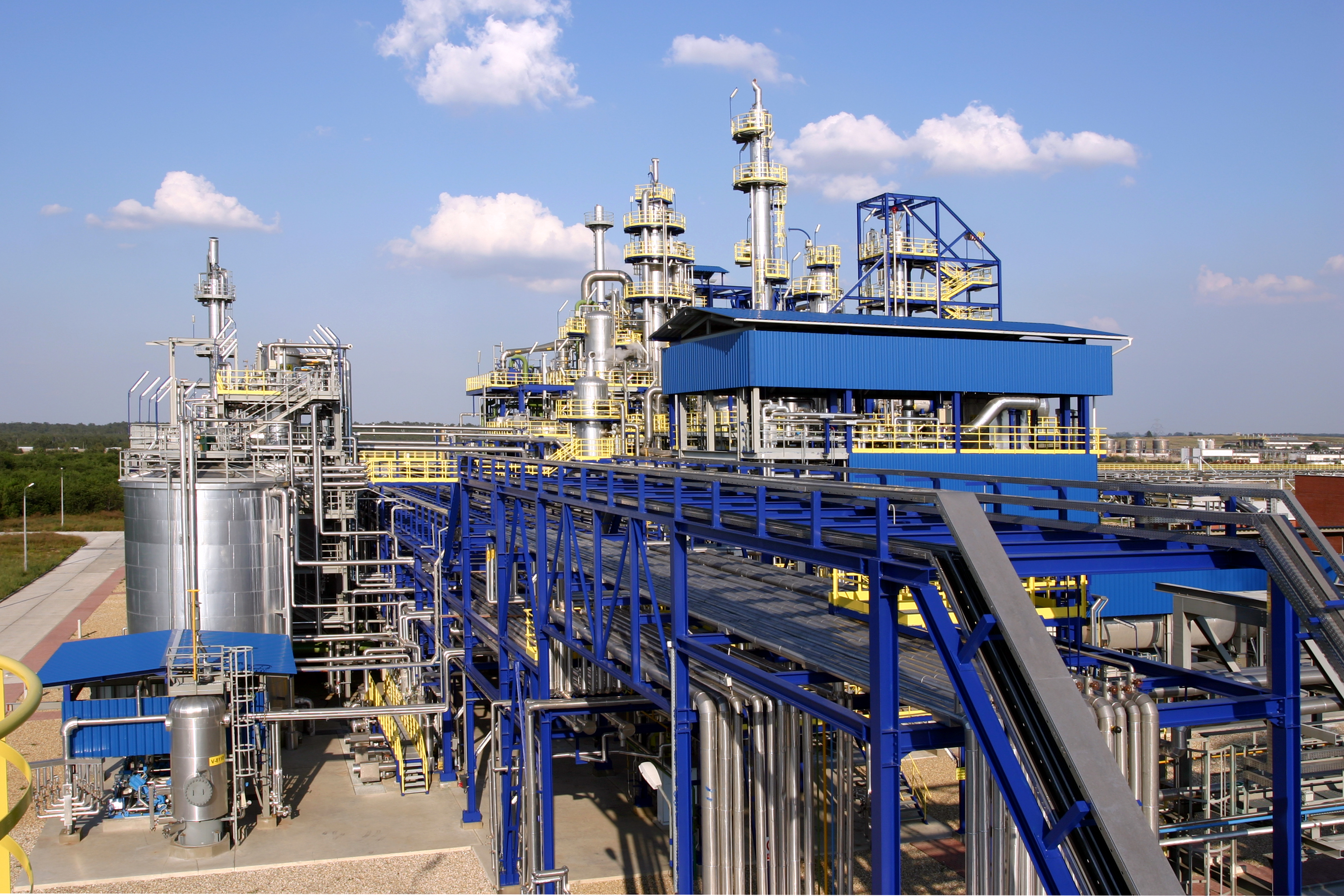
Zakłady Azotowe Puławy

== Notable people ==
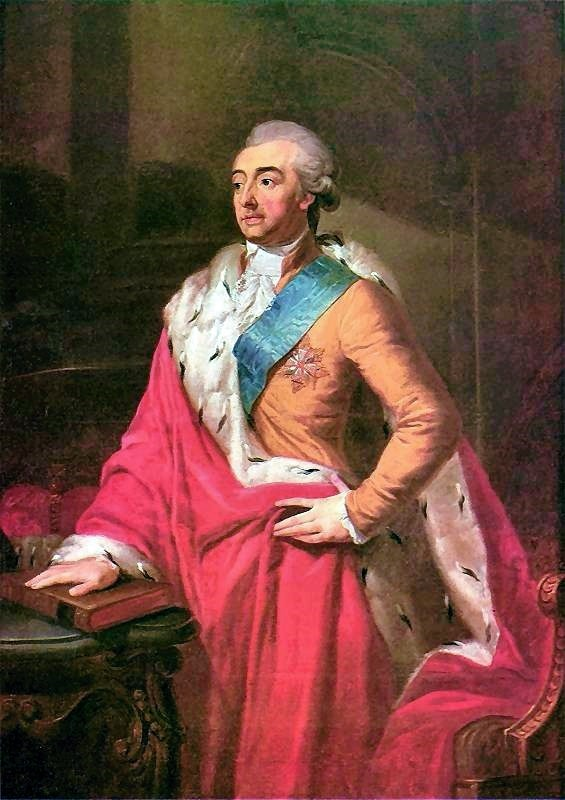
Prince Adam Kazimierz Czartoryski

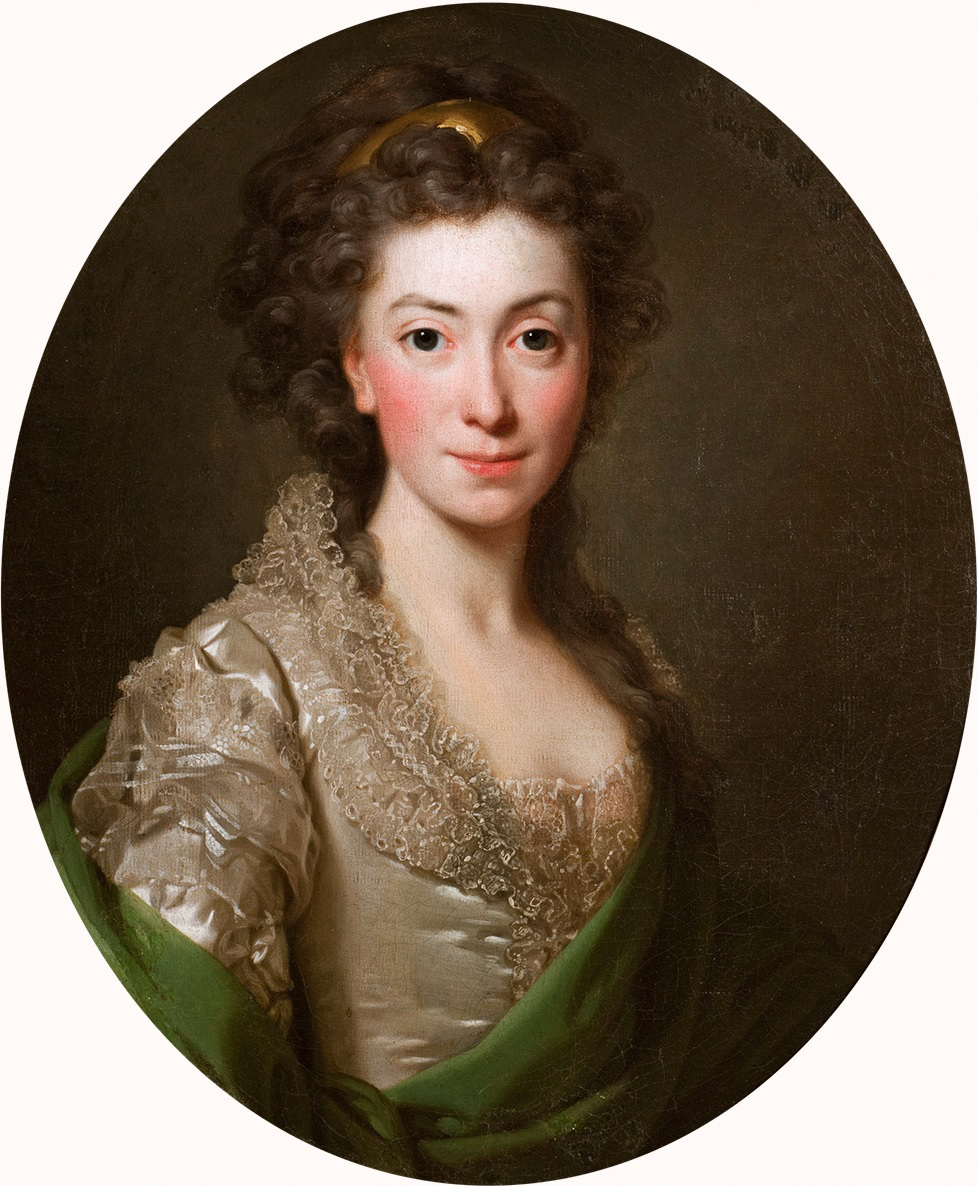
Princess Izabela Czartoryska

- Adam Kazimierz Czartoryski (1734–1823), aristocrat, writer, literary and theater critic, linguist, traveller and statesman
- Princess Izabela Czartoryska (1746–1835), noblewoman, writer, and art collector, widely regarded as a very prominent figure of the Polish Enlightenment, the founder of Poland's first museum, the Czartoryski Museum, now situated in Kraków
- Adam Jerzy Czartoryski (1770–1861), nobleman, statesman and author
- Maria Wirtemberska (1768–1854), noble, writer, and philanthropist
- Adam of Württemberg (1792–1847), Duke of Württemberg, grandson of Princess Izabela Czartoryska
- Jan Feliks Piwarski (1794–1859), painter, curator, writer and graphic artist
- Bolesław Prus (1847–1912), novelist, a leading figure in the history of Polish literature
- Józef Wierusz-Kowalski (1866–1927), physicist and diplomat
- Julia Kratowska (1870–1946), activist, educator and politician
- Samuel Tyszelman (1921–1941), member of the French Resistance during World War II
- Irena Stankiewicz (born 1925), graphic artist
- Stanisław Szmajzner (1927–1989), anti-Nazi resistance fighter, one of 58 known survivors of the Sobibór extermination camp
- Beata Szymańska (born 1938), poet and writer
- Marian Opania (born 1943), film actor and singer
- Bohdan Zadura (born 1945), poet, translator and literary critic
- Tomasz Adamski (born 1963), singer and guitarist, member of the acclaimed 1980s post-punk band Siekiera
- Bartosz Opania (born 1970), film, television and theatre actor
- Blanka Lipińska (born 1985), cosmetologist and author
- Konrad Czerniak (born 1989), swimmer
- Kinga Achruk (born 1989), handball player
- Malwina Kopron (born 1994), hammer thrower

== Twin towns – sister cities ==
Puławy is twinned with:

- Boyarka, Ukraine
- Castelo Branco, Portugal
- Dubliany, Ukraine
- Nyasvizh, Belarus
- Stendal, Germany

Former twin towns, both having ended their relation due to implementation of an LGBT ideology-free zone:

- Douai, France
- Nieuwegein, Netherlands

== See also ==
- Włostowice, Puławy
- Zakłady Azotowe Puławy

== Bibliography ==
- Encyklopedia Polski
