= Julia Kratowska =

Polish activist, educator and politician

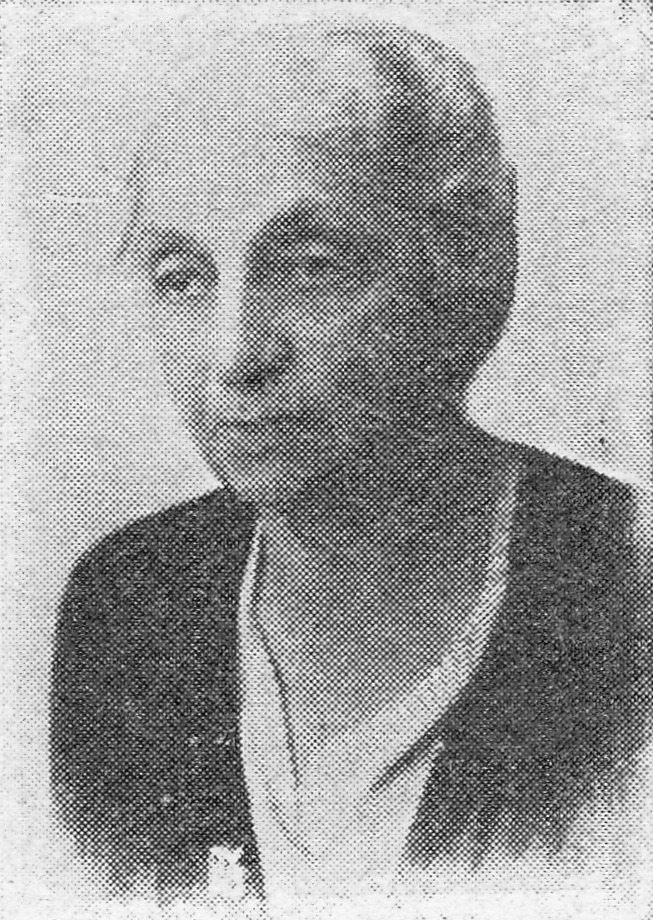

Senator of the Second Polish Republic
- In office 1935–1938

Personal details
- Born: April 24, 1870 Puławy, Lublin Governorate, Congress Poland
- Died: September 27, 1946 (aged 76) Ciechanów, Poland

Julia Kratowska (April 24, 1870 – September 27, 1946) was a Polish activist, educator and politician. She served in the Senate of the Second Polish Republic.

The daughter of Józef Kratowski and Zofia Filipkowska, she was born in Puławy and studied at the Aleksandryjsko-Maryjskiego Institute for Women's Education in Warsaw. From 1889 to 1891, she ran a school in Lublin. In 1901, she joined the Polish Socialist Party; the sixth congress of the party was held in her apartment. She was arrested in 1907 and imprisoned. She was able to escape in 1909 and fled to Zakopane. During World War I, she was a member of the Polish Military Organisation and operated an orphanage for the children of members of the Polish Legions. In 1918, she moved to Ciechanów. Kratowska taught in private schools there and also served as a member of city council. From 1932 to 1935, she served on the powiat school council. From 1935 to 1938, she was a member of the Polish senate.

At the start of World War II, she moved to Warsaw. After the failure of the Warsaw Uprising, she went to Rzeczków near Biała Rawska. In June 1945, she returned to Ciechanów. There, she taught at a junior high school and gave private lessons.

Kratowska received the following honors:

- Cross of Independence in 1930
- Gold Cross of Merit in 1930
- Struggle for Polish schools badge in 1931
- Silver Academic Laurel in 1935

Kratowska died in Ciechanów at the age of 76.
