= Taikury =

Taikury Тайкури
- Village
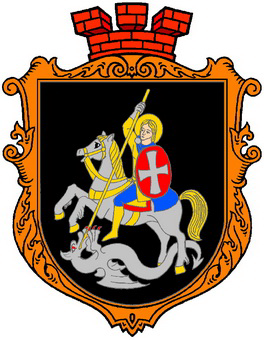
- Flag Coat of arms

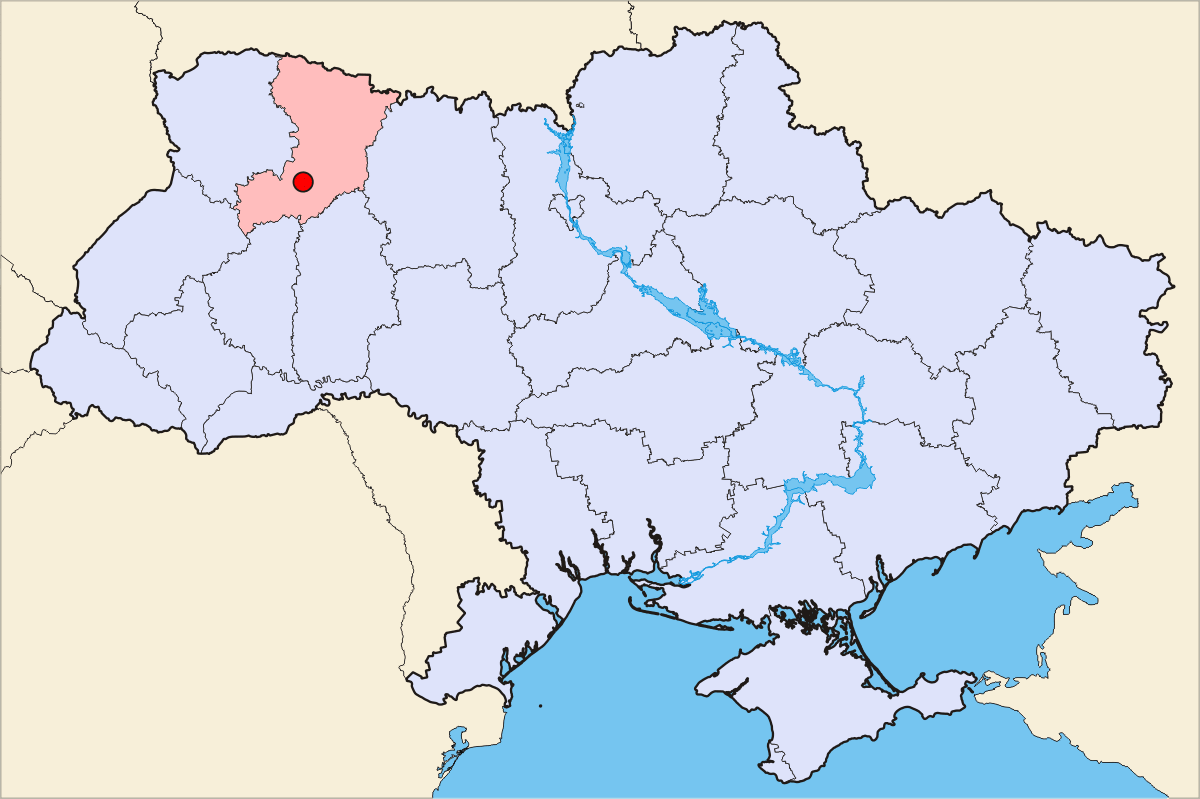
- Location within the Rivne Oblast
- Coordinates: 50°31′55″N 26°22′15″E
- Country: Ukraine
- Oblast: Rivne Oblast
- Raion: Rivne Raion
- Hromada: Kornyn rural hromada
- Founded: 1570

Area
  - Total: 1.84 km^{2} (0.71 sq mi)
- Elevation: 253 m (830 ft)

Population (2001)
  - Total: 619
  - Density: 336/km^{2} (870/sq mi)
- Time zone: UTC+2 (EET)
  - Summer (DST): UTC+3 (EEST)
- Postal code: 35351
- Area code: +380 362

Taikury (Ukrainian: Тайкури) is a village in Rivne Raion, Rivne Oblast, Ukraine. As of the year 2001, the community had 619 residents.

== History ==
The first mention about a village Taikury is dated 1570 by a year. In 1583 a village belonged to I. Shpanovsky, and after wedding of Theodora Shpanovska with Yuri Wyshnewetsky stepped back to the influential princely family of Wyshnewetsky. From 1614 a village got a Magdeburg Law. After a receipt by the small town of Magdeburg Law his population increased notedly, handicraft life came alive. At the beginning of the 18th century Taikury passed to the family of Peplovsky.

The village is mentioned in Kresowa księga sprawiedliwych on page 107.

== Geography ==
The area of the Taikury is 18,40 km^{2}. Community population: 698 (2025). The village of Taykury is located in the south Kornyn rural hromada.

The relief of the village is flat, covered with pine and oak forests.

The larger area of the village is located in the Volhynian Upland. The Taikury is located in the Pripyat River basin, with tributaries of the Horyn River flowing through the district. The climate of the region is moderately continental: winter is mild (in January -4.4 °, -5.1 °), with unstable frosts; summer is warm (in July +18.8 °), not hot. Most often, comfortable weather is observed in the summer months. The formation of stable snow cover is noted in the second decade of December. Rainfall 550 mm per year.

The territory of the Taikury is dominated by gray podzolized soils and chernozem.

The agriculture of the village specializes in growing grain crops, legumes, and oilseeds.

The Taikury is located near major transport hubs Rivne and Zdovbuniv, as well as is a national highway H-25 and an international highway Е-40. There is an international airport in Rivne.

== Architectural sights ==
- Castle (ruins), 16th-17th century
- Church of St. Lawrence, 1710 (Baroque)
- Church of the Intercession, 1730

== Notable people ==
- Jan Paweł Woronicz, poet and clergyman
