= Kornyn rural hromada =

Municipality in Rivne Oblast, Ukraine

Kornyn rural hromada Корнинська сільська громада
- Hromada
- Interactive map of Kornyn rural hromada
- Country: Ukraine
- Oblast (province): Rivne Oblast
- Raion (district): Rivne Raion
- Established: 2018
- Administrative center: Kornyn

Area
  - Total: 66.12 km^{2} (25.53 sq mi)

Population
  - Total: 8,851
  - Density: 133.9/km^{2} (346.7/sq mi)

Kornyn rural hromada is one of the hromadas of Rivne Raion in Rivne Oblast of Ukraine. Its administrative centre is the village of Kornyn. The Kornyn territorial hromada is located to the southeast of Rivne. The larger area of the hromada is located in the Volhynian Upland. The Kornynrural hromada is located in the Pripyat River basin. Community population: 8873 (2025).

== Composition ==
The community was established on December 23, 2018 by merging the Dyadkovytska, Verkhivska and Maloshpakivska rural districts. The hromada consists of 5 villages:

- Kolodenka
- Kornyn
- Porozove
- Taikury
- Zahoroshcha

== Geography ==
The area of the Kornyn rural hromada is 66.0 km^{2}. Community population: 8873 (2025). The Kornyn territorial hromada is located to the southeast of Rivne and east of Zdolbunov.

The relief of the hromada is flat, partly lowland, covered with pine and oak forests. Kornynrural hromada has reserves of peat, clay.

The larger area of the hromada is located in the Volhynian Upland. The Kornynrural hromada is located in the Pripyat River basin, with tributaries of the Horyn River flowing through the district. The climate of the region is moderately continental: winter is mild (in January -4.4 °, -5.1 °), with unstable frosts; summer is warm (in July +18.8 °), not hot. Most often, comfortable weather is observed in the summer months. The formation of stable snow cover is noted in the second decade of December. Rainfall 550 mm per year.

The territory of the Kornyn rural hromada is dominated by gray podzolized soils and chernozem.

The agriculture of the Kornyn rural hromada specializes in growing grain crops, legumes, and oilseeds.

The territory of the community includes the Botanical Reserve of Local Importance "Kornynsky" with an area of 76 hectares, and the Ethnological Reserve of Local Importance "Kolodensky" with an area of 12 hectares.

The Kornyn rural hromada is located near major transport hubs Rivne and Zdovbuniv, as well as is a national highway H-25 and an international highway Е-40. There is an international airport in Rivne.
