= Kajetan Sołtyk =

Polish priest and bishop

- Bishop of Krakow
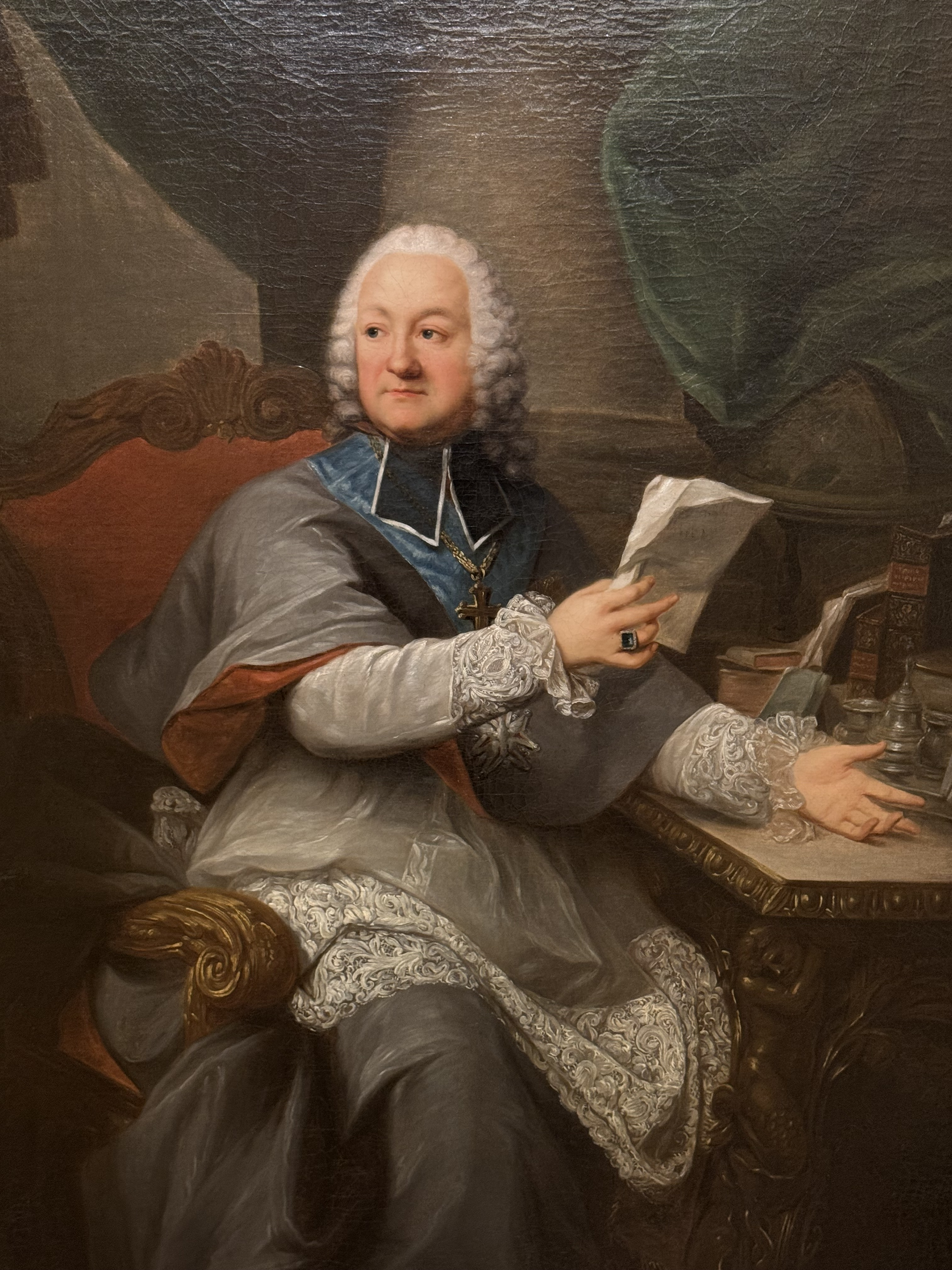
- Bishop Kajetan Sołtyk by Marcello Bacciarelli, National Museum in Wrocław
- Predecessor: Andrzej Stanisław Załuski
- Successor: Feliks Turski
- Other post: Bishop of Kyiv

Personal details
- Born: November 12, 1715
- Died: July 30, 1788 (aged 72)
- Denomination: Catholic Church

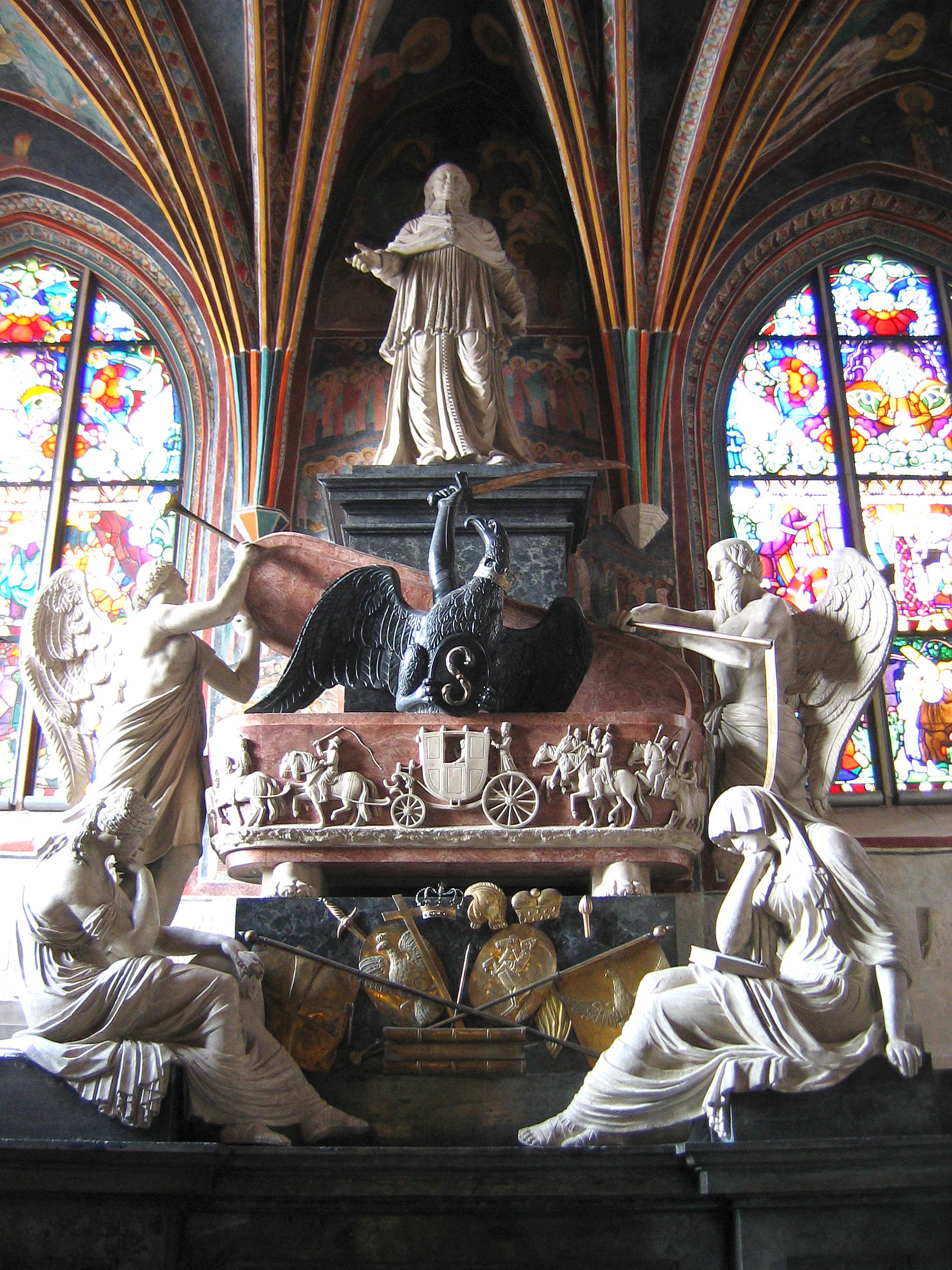
Tomb of Kajetan Soltyk in Wawel Cathedral

Kajetan Ignacy Sołtyk (12 November 1715 – 30 July 1788) was a Polish Catholic priest, bishop of Kyiv from 1756, bishop of Kraków from 13 March 1759.

== Biography ==
Kajetan Sołtyk was the son of Józef Sołtyk, castellan of Lublin and court marshal to primate of Poland, Teodor Potocki, and Konstancja z Drzewickich, brother of Tomasz Sołtyk (voivode of Łęczyca) and Maciej Sołtyk (castellan of Warsaw), scion of the great Saltykov family of Russia, he was educated by Jesuits and took Holy Orders in 1732. From 1735 to 1738 he studied in Rome (University of Rome La Sapienza).

After his father died, saddling the family with debt, Kajetan was unable to afford to return to Poland until 1740, when he attached himself to the court of bishop of Kraków Jan Lipski. Since then he started becoming more and more active on the political scene. In 1753 he was involved in a blood libel process against Jews, which resulted in 13 of them being sentenced to death. As a politician he was known to use unethical means - from nepotism through forgery of documents to bribing the local szlachta (Polish nobility) at sejmiks (local parliaments). During the reign of Augustus III of Poland, known to be the height of political corruption and anarchy in the Polish–Lithuanian Commonwealth, he became one of the most important politicians at the royal court, working closely with the de facto ruler of Poland, Count Heinrich von Brühl. In 1756 he became the bishop of Kiev. However, from the early 1760s due to various conflicts he distanced himself from Brühl.

After the death of Augustus III, Kajetan Sołtyk initially opposed the election of Stanisław August Poniatowski, although later, partially due to his worsening health, Soltyk somewhat distanced himself from politics. He became deeply involved in politics again as the Russian Empire ambassador Nicholas Repnin started fomenting unrest in the Commonwealth by encouraging the Protestants, the Eastern Catholics and the Orthodox to demand all state positions equal to that of the Roman Catholics including a royal one. One of Sołtyk's main goals then became to dethrone King Poniatowski. In the shifting world of political alliances, for a time he worked with pro-Russian factions, but eventually became an opponent of Repnin.

During the Repnin Sejm in 1767, Sołtyk opposed the practical dictatorship of Repnin, and for this opposition he was arrested and imprisoned in Kaluga, along with three other Polish senators (Józef Andrzej Załuski, Wacław Rzewuski and Seweryn Rzewuski). Sołtyk was a vocal opponent of giving non-Catholics equality with Catholics, and he issued a manifest calling for prayers for preservation of the faith and national freedoms which initiated the Bar confederation.

Sołtyk returned from his imprisonment in 1773. He protested the First partition of Poland in the Senate. His increasingly erratic behavior allowed his opponents, in 1781, to declare him insane by the Permanent Council and King Stanisław August. A special commission was tasked with investigating his situation. The problem caused much controversy, as it was alleged that the investigators were influenced by various political motivations. The Sejm of 1782 was heavily preoccupied with this case. One of the primary issues was the relevance of the neminem captivabimus law, which had no provisions for mentally ill persons, and which guaranteed wide personal freedoms to Polish nobility. Amendment bills were submitted, but were met with opposition and filibusterer, preventing the Sejm from making much progress on any issues. Eventually, Sołtyk failed to reclaim his bishopric from the substitutes who administered it in his absence. Thus for the last years of his life his political influence and power significantly waned.

== Notes ==
Catholic Church titles
Preceded by Samuel Jan Ożga	Bishop of Kiev; 1756–1759	Succeeded by Józef Andrzej Załuski
Preceded by Andrzej Stanisław Załuski	Bishop of Kraków; 1759–1788	Succeeded by Feliks Turski
