= Jan Paweł Woronicz =

Former Bishop of Krakow

- Bishop of Krakow
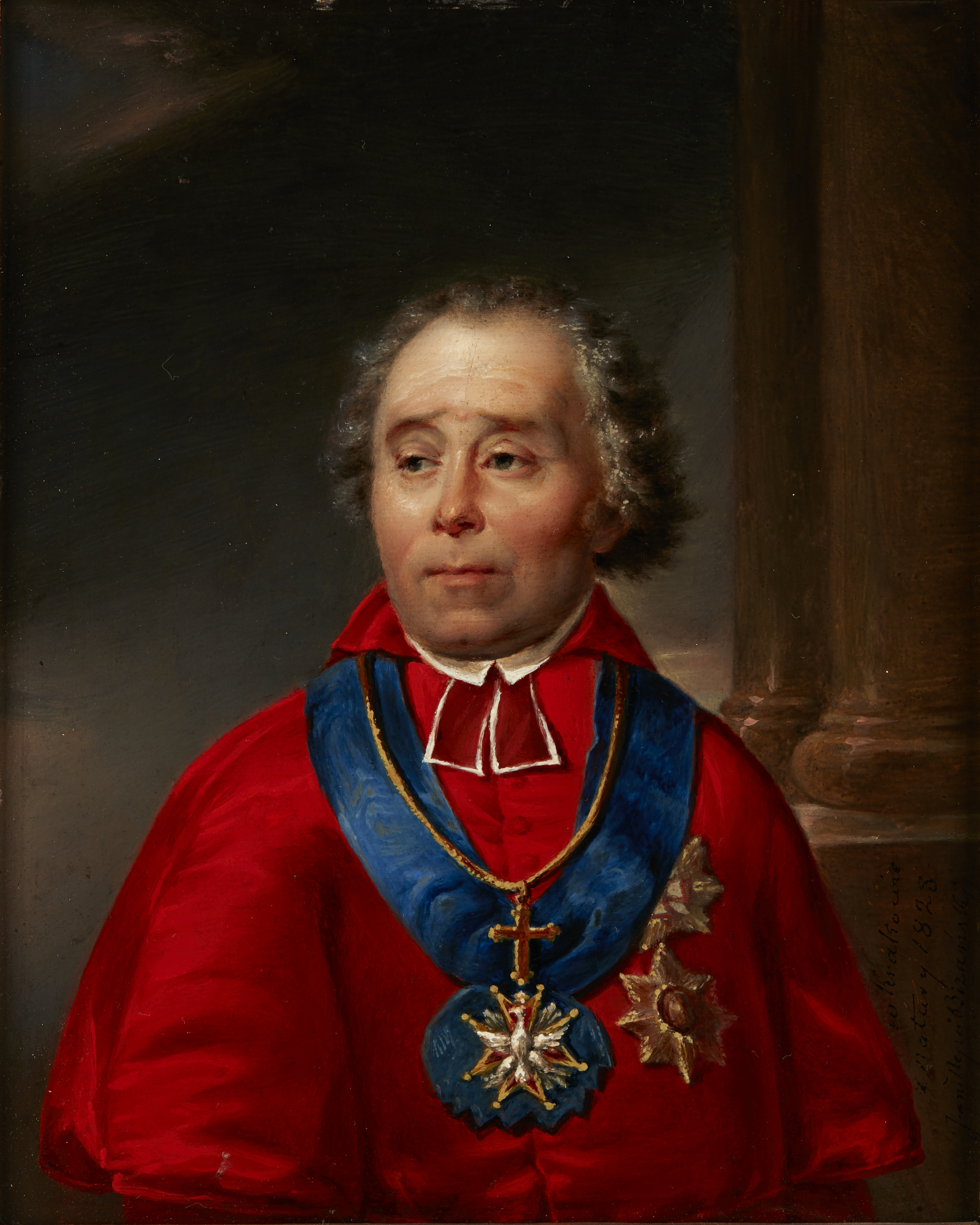
- Wearing the Order of the White Eagle
- Predecessor: Andrzej Gawroński
- Successor: Karol Skórkowski

Personal details
- Born: 1757 Taikury
- Died: 1829 (aged 71–72) Vienna
- Buried: Wawel Cathedral
- Residence: Bishop's Palace
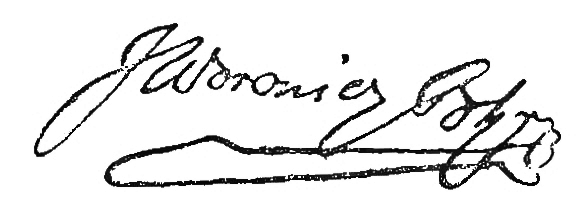
- Signature

- Coat of arms

Jan Paweł Woronicz (1757 – 1829) was a Polish clergyman, orator, and poet. He lived through major periods such as the Partitions of Poland and Napoleonic Wars, and his work included themes from these events. At the time of his death, he was concurrently the Bishop of Kraków (1815-1829), Bishop of Warsaw (1827-1829), and Primate of Poland (1828-1829).

== Biography ==
Jan Paweł Woronicz was born into the nobility near Tajkury. His early education was with the Jesuits in Ostróg, and he later entered a seminary in Warsaw to become a priest by 1784. According to writer Stanisław Baczyński, Woronicz's notoriety began to grow during his time as parish priest of Liw. During the Great Sejm (1788-1792), he became even more well known for his speeches.

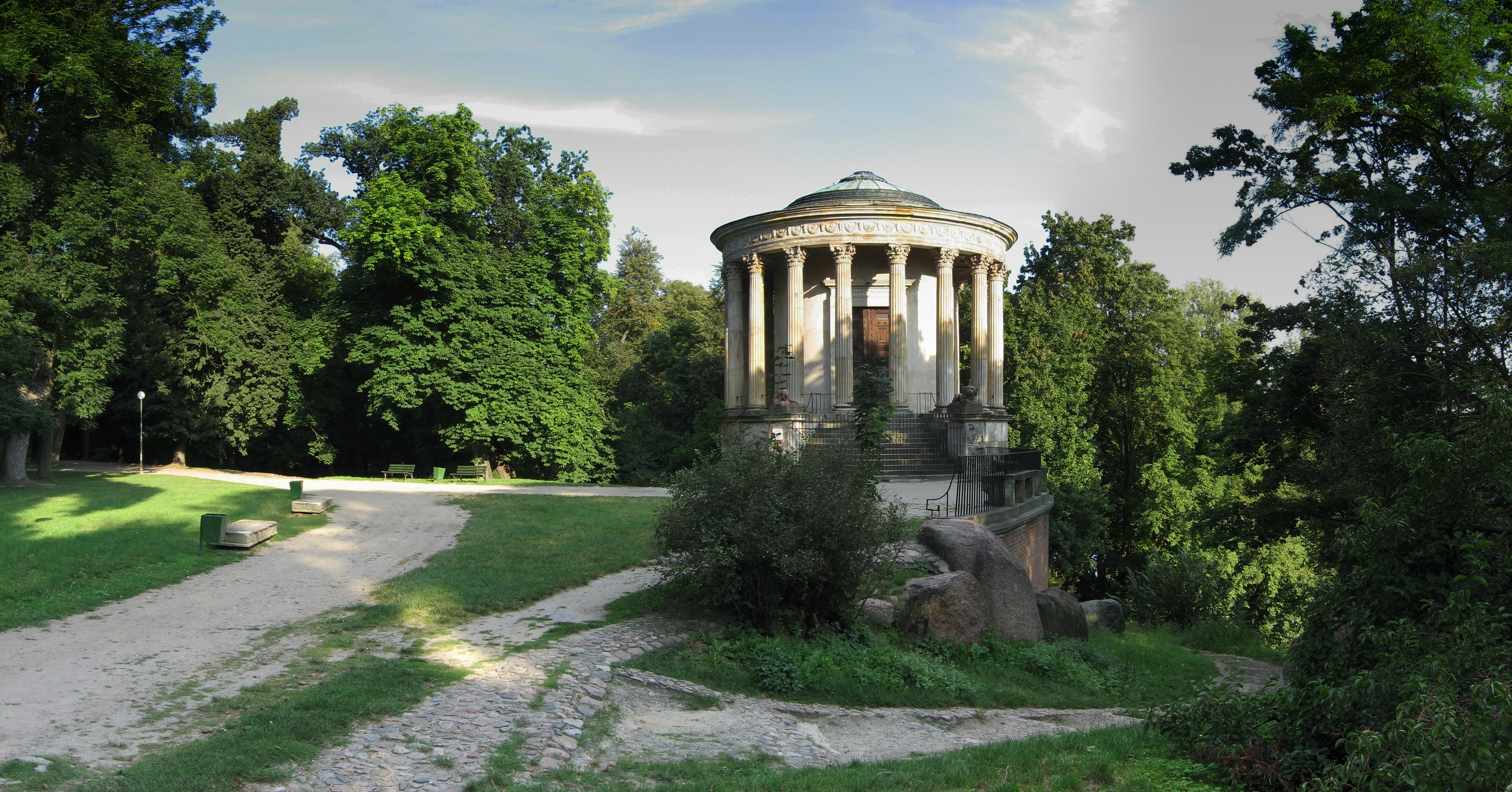
Temple of the Sibyl, Puławy

Woronicz eventually moved to a rectory in the Puławy region and became associated with the Czartoryski family. It was around this time that he produced his first notable work of poetry, Sybilli, which was published much later in 1818.

Woronicz's prestige grew more when he was made a state councilor during the period of Napoleon's influence in Poland. He presided over the funerals of Tadeusz Kościuszko and Józef Poniatowski in the 1810s. He was then made Bishop of Kraków in 1815 and Bishop of Warsaw in 1827. As bishop, he commissioned works for the Bishop's Palace that glorified the Kościuszko Uprising and pre-partition Poland.

Woronicz died in Vienna.

== Works ==
Historian Piotr S. Wandycz described Woronicz's works as favoring the classical tradition while limiting literary innovation. As such, Woronicz and his peers preferred odes and grand poems as tools to glorify the Dutchy of Warsaw, Napoleon, or other core elements of contemporary Polish patriotism. Historian Anna Nasiłowska also notes themes of classical antiquity in Woronicz's early poem, Sybilli. In the poem, Woronicz combines imagery of Troy and Rome with that of the fall and anticipated rise of Poland. Woronicz's poem Hymn do Boga (1805) is described by Roland Greene as a messianic version of Polish history that eventually influenced poets after Woronicz.

== See also ==
- France and Poland during Napoleonic era
- Third Partition of Poland
- Polish literature

Catholic Church titles
| Preceded by Andrzej Gawroński | Bishop of Kraków; 1815-1829 | Succeeded by Karol Skórkowski |
| Preceded by Wojciech Skarszewski | Bishop of Warsaw; 1828-1829 | Succeeded by Stanisław Kostka Choromański |
