= Tomasz Sołtyk =

Polish nobleman

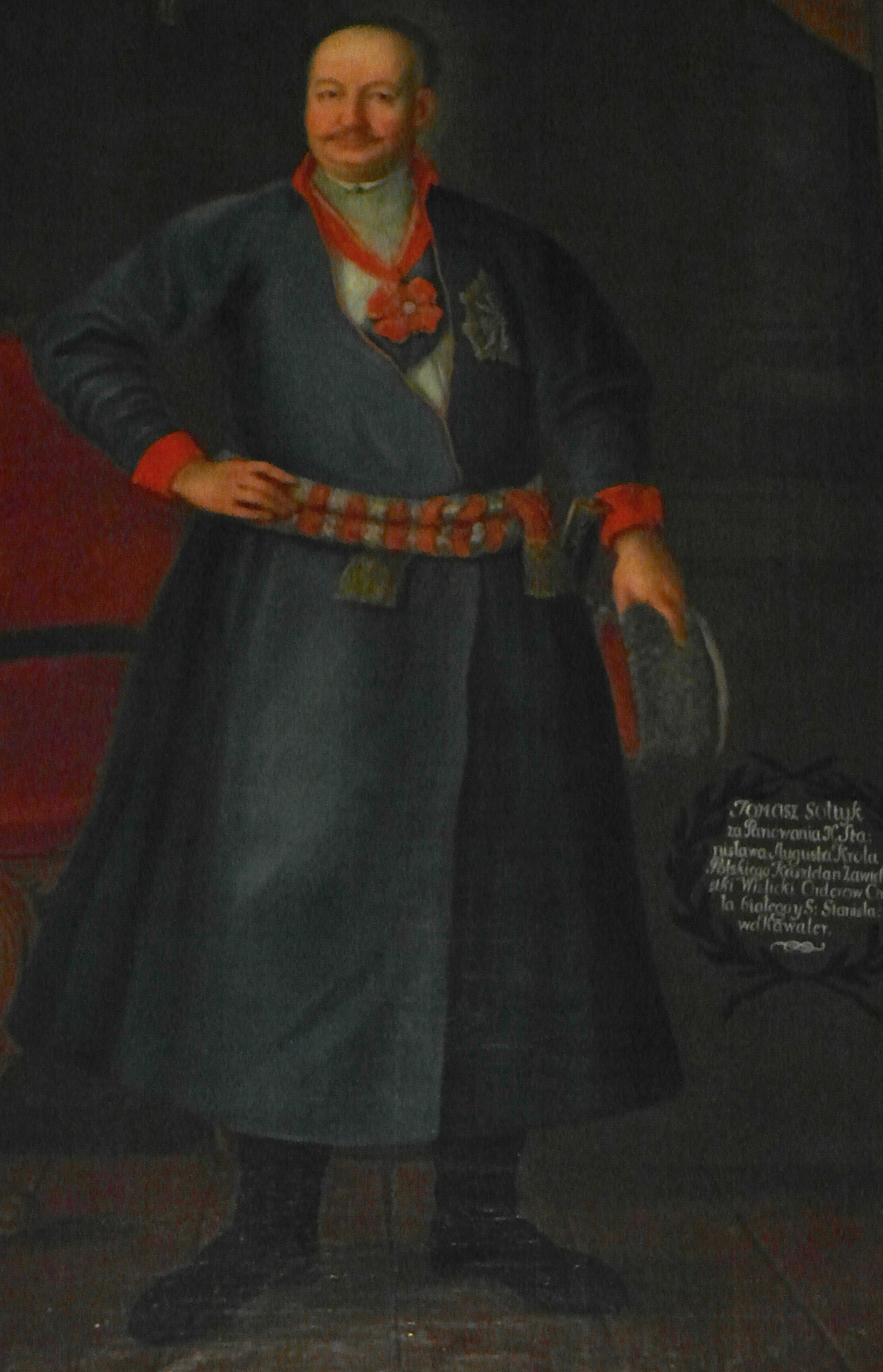
- Tomasz Sołtyk in 1808
- Coat of arms: Sołtyk
- Born: 1732
- Died: 24 April 1808 (aged 75–76)
- Buried: Stopnica
- Noble family: Sołtyk
- Father: Michal Aleksander Sołtyk
- Mother: Józefina Makowiecka

Tomasz Sołtyk (1732 – 24 April 1808) was a Polish nobleman.

Tomasz was castellan of Zawichost, later of Wiślica. As a senator he participated in the Great Sejm.

Tomasz Sołtyk was married to Helena Żeleńska.
