= Karol Skórkowski =

Polish bishop

His Excellency Karol Skórkowski
- Bishop of Kraków
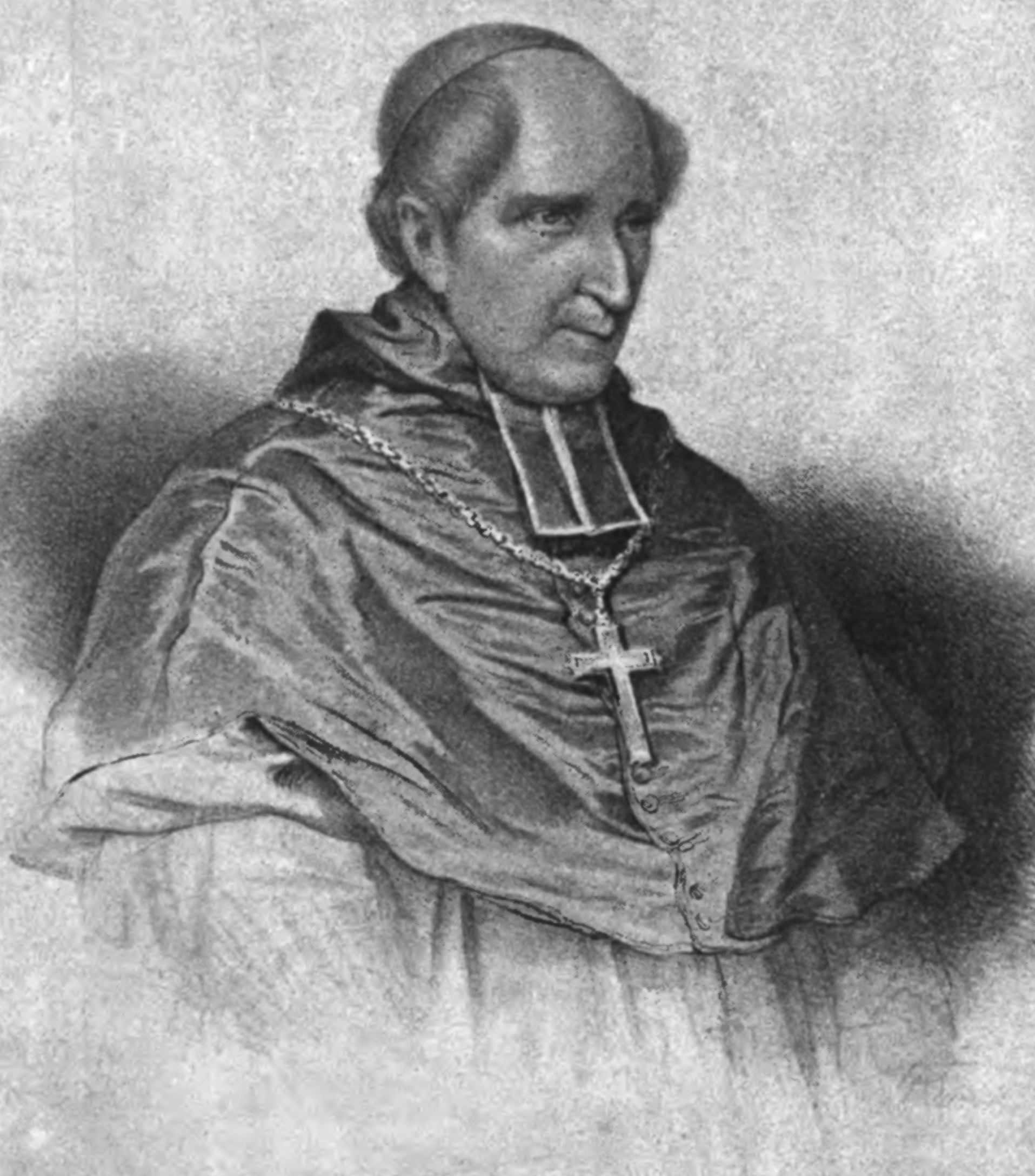
- Church: Roman Catholic
- Archdiocese: Kraków
- Appointed: 27 July 1829
- In office: 1829-1851
- Predecessor: Jan Paweł Woronicz
- Successor: Albin Dunajewski

Orders
- Consecration: 24 January 1830 by Prosper Burzyński
- Rank: Bishop

Personal details
- Born: 1768 Jankowice, Poland
- Died: 25 January 1851 (aged 82–83) Opawa, Lower Silesian Voivodeship, Germany (Present day Poland)
- Buried: Wawel Cathedral
- Coat of arms

Karol Skórkowski (1768–1851) was a Polish bishop. Elected bishop of Kraków in 1828, his election was confirmed in 1829 and he was consecrated in early 1830.

He was a supporter of the November Uprising (1830–1831). After the fall of the uprising, he was arrested by the Russian government. Vatican, pressured by Moscow, forced him to leave Kraków; he would find sanctuary in Opava (Vatican however did not agree to remove him from his office). After his death in 1851, there would be no new bishop of Kraków until 1879.

| Preceded by Jan Paweł Woronicz | Bishop of Kraków; 1830–1851 | Succeeded by Albin Dunajewski |
