= Andrzej Gawroński (bishop) =

Bishop of Kraków (1740–1813)

- Bishop of Kraków
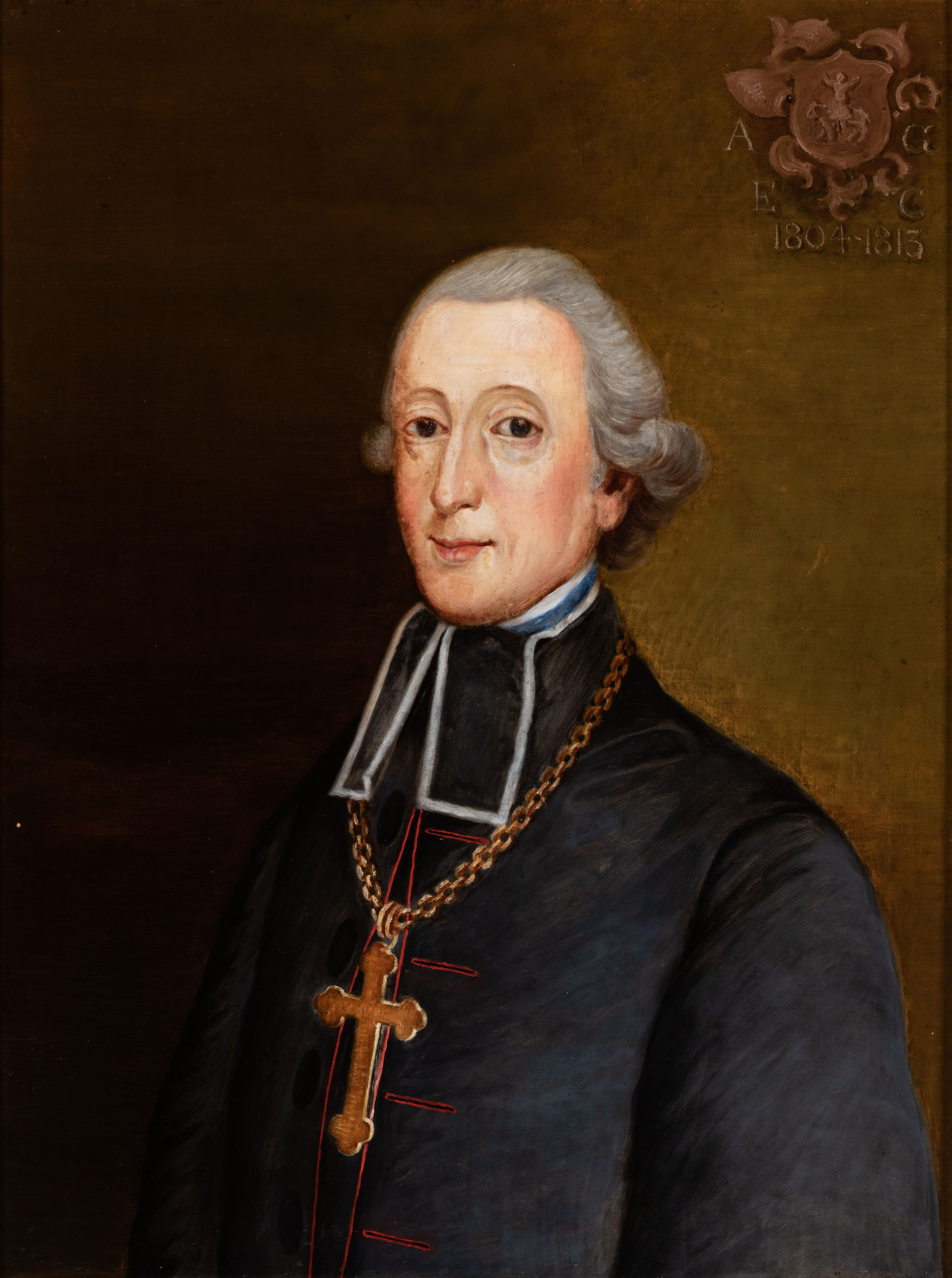
- Predecessor: Feliks Turski
- Successor: Jan Paweł Woronicz

Personal details
- Born: November 30, 1740
- Died: April 7, 1813 (aged 72)

Andrzej Gawroński (30 November 1740 – 7 April 1813) was a Jesuit clergyman and educator. He was Bishop of Kraków from 1805 to 1813.

Gawroński's education was in astronomy and physics. During Stanisław August Poniatowski's reign, Gawroński was involved with the Commission of National Education, which functioned as the education ministry of the Polish-Lithuanian Commonwealth. During his educational career, Gawroński translated French works into Polish and authored Geometryję i Arytmetykę. He also worked as a lector for Poniatowski. He was then made Bishop of Kraków after 1804.

Gawroński died on April 7, 1813.

Catholic Church titles
Preceded by Feliks Turski	Bishop of Kraków; 1805-1813	Succeeded by Jan Paweł Woronicz
