= Andrzej Gawroński (actor) =

Polish actor (1935–2020)

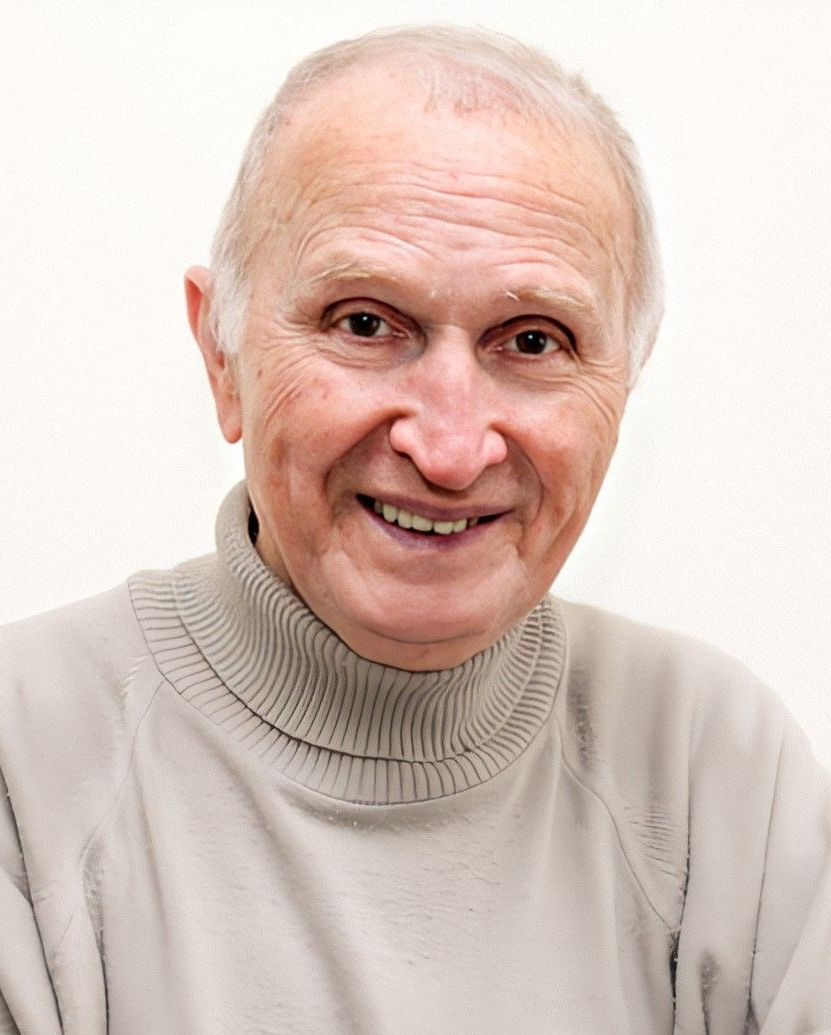
Andrzej Gawroński

Andrzej Gawroński (10 February 1935 – 4 September 2020) was a Polish film and theatre actor. He was the brother of actor Aleksander Gawroński. He was born in Warsaw, and was the uncle of Agata Gawrońska-Bauman, whose husband is Adam Bauman.
