= Frederick William, Duke of Cieszyn =

Frederick William
- Duke of Cieszyn
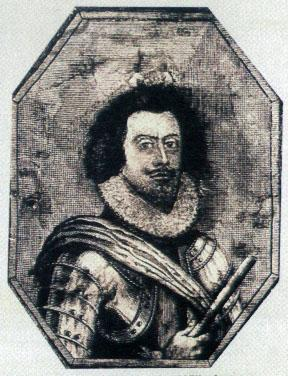
- Born: 9 November 1601; Teschen
- Died: 19 August 1625 (aged 23)
- Noble family: Silesian Piasts
- Issue: (illeg.) Maria Magdalena
- Father: Adam Wenceslaus, Duke of Cieszyn
- Mother: Elisabeth Kettler of Courland

Frederick William of Cieszyn (German: Friedrich Wilhelm von Teschen; Czech: Bedřich Vilém Těšínský; Polish: Fryderyk Wilhelm cieszyński; 9 November 1601 – 19 August 1625) was a Duke of Cieszyn (Teschen) since 1617 until his death; he was the last male scion of the Cieszyn branch of Silesian Piasts.

== Life ==
He was the third but only surviving son of Adam Wenceslaus, Duke of Cieszyn, by his wife Elisabeth, daughter of Gotthard Kettler, Duke of Courland. His mother died from childbirth complications ten days after his birth, on 19 November 1601.

Since his early years, Frederick's education was entrusted to the Silesian humanist Baltazar Exner. In 1610 Duke Adam Wenceslaus decided to convert to the Catholicism, and all the Protestant members of his court were dismissed, among them also Exner. Frederick William was then sent to the Jesuits in Munich, Bavaria.

On 13 July 1617 Duke Adam Wenceslaus died and was succeeded by Frederick William. Despite this, the young Duke remained in Munich until 1624. On his behalf, the authority over the Duchy was exercised by a Regency council, which included Archduke Charles of Habsburg, Bishop of Wrocław, Charles I of Liechtenstein, Duke of Opava and Krnov and George of Oppersdorf, Starost of Opole-Racibórz. However, the real power in Cieszyn was held by the Duke's sister, Elizabeth Lucretia.

During the 1620s a plague infected Cieszyn and many citizens died. The Duchy was also affected by the Thirty Years' War and plundered by various forces. In 1620 Skoczów was destroyed by the Lisowczycy troops, who recognized Protestant inhabitants of this city as their enemies. In 1621, Cieszyn was severely destroyed by the Imperial troops stationed here under the command of Colonel Charles Spinelli. Finally, in 1622 Cieszyn was the battlefield in the fight between the Protestants troops of George, Margrave of Brandenburg-Ansbach, and the Catholics forces led by Charles Hannibal of Dohna.

In religious sphere he was tolerant and avoided restrictions towards both Catholics and Protestants.

The beginning of Frederick William's independent rule in 1624 didn't bring any relief to the Duchy; moreover, soon afterwards (in early 1625), he left Cieszyn and went to serve the Emperor in the Spanish Netherlands, where he obtained the post of military commander of the district. During this journey, the Duke became suddenly ill and died on 19 August 1625 in Cologne.

Frederick William was buried in the Dominican church in Cieszyn.

He never married, and only left an illegitimate daughter, Maria Magdalena (b. c. 1624 – d. c. 1661), who was legitimized by Emperor Ferdinand III and created Baroness of Hohenstein by Imperial order at Vienna on 8 May 1640. She married firstly with Tluck of Toschonowitz, marshal of the Cieszyn castle, and after his death with Nicholas Rudzki.

== Ancestry ==
Ancestors of Frederick William, Duke of Cieszyn

16. Casimir II, Duke of Cieszyn
8. Wenceslaus II, Duke of Cieszyn
17. Johanna of Poděbrady
4. Wenceslaus III Adam, Duke of Cieszyn
18. Frederick I, Margrave of Brandenburg-Ansbach
9. Anna of Brandenburg-Ansbach
19. Sophia of Poland
2. Adam Wenceslaus, Duke of Cieszyn
20. Magnus I, Duke of Saxe-Lauenburg
10. Francis I, Duke of Saxe-Lauenburg
21. Catherine of Brunswick-Wolfenbüttel
5. Sidonia Catharina of Saxe-Lauenburg
22. Henry IV, Duke of Saxony
11. Sibylle of Saxony
23. Catherine of Mecklenburg
1. Frederick William of Cieszyn
24. Gotthard Kettler, Herr zu Neu-Assen
12. Gotthard Kettler, Herr zu Neu-Assen-Melrich
25. Margareta van Bronckhorst-Batenburg
6. Gotthard Kettler, Duke of Courland
13. Sophie of Nesselrode
3. Elisabeth Kettler of Courland
28. Magnus II, Duke of Mecklenburg
14. Albert VII, Duke of Mecklenburg
29. Sophie of Pomerania-Wolgast
7. Anna of Mecklenburg
30. Joachim I Nestor, Elector of Brandenburg
15. Anna of Brandenburg
31. Elizabeth of Denmark

== Footnotes ==
Frederick William, Duke of Cieszyn House of Piast Born: 9 November 1601 Died: 19 August 1625
Regnal titles
Preceded by Adam Wenceslaus	Duke of Cieszyn; 1617–1625	Succeeded by Elizabeth Lucretia
