= Teschen =

Teschen may refer to:

- Cieszyn, Poland, known as Teschen in German
- Český Těšín, Czech Republic, a town split off from Cieszyn in 1920
- Cieszyn Silesia, a geographic region spanning the Czech–Polish border
- Duchy of Teschen, a historical region in Central Europe
  - Flag of the Duchy of Teschen
- Cieszyn Silesian dialect, a West Slavic dialect spoken in Cieszyn Silesia

== See also ==
- History of Cieszyn
