= Frederick Casimir =

Frederick Casimir may refer to:

- Frederick Casimir, Count Palatine of Zweibrücken-Landsberg (1585–1645)
- Frederick Casimir of Cieszyn (1541 or 1542 – 1571), Polish prince

== See also ==
- Frederick Casimir Kettler (1650–1698), Duke of Courland and Semigallia
