= Duchy of Bielsko =

Coordinates: 49°49′15″N 19°02′35″E

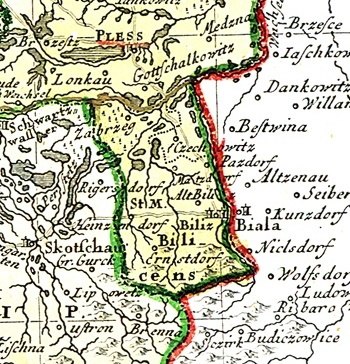
Map of the county in 1746

The Duchy of Bielsko (German: freie Standesherrschaft Bielitz, Fürstentum Bielitz, Herzogtum Bielitz, Latin: status minores Bilicensis, status maiores Bilicensis, ducatus Bilicensis, Polish: księstwo bielskie,Czech: Bílské knížectví ) was one of the duchies of Silesia.

It was created in 1572 out of the Duchy of Cieszyn as vassal of Bohemia and sold by Wenceslaus III Adam, Duke of Cieszyn to Charles Promnitz. Lately, in 1582 was sold to Adam Schaffgotsch, but ten years later was sold again to Sunnegh family. They in 1724 sold state country to Henry of Salm. In 1743 was county owned by Count Friedrich Wilhelm von Haugwitz and in 1751 its status was changed to status maiores, so it can send deputies to Silesian Assembly.

In 1752, the State Country (Status Maiores) of Bielsko was purchased by Aleksander Józef Sułkowski. In that same year, the State Country was changed to the status of a lower principality (Fürstentum). On November 2, 1754, Queen Maria Theresa of Austria created the Principality of Bielsko (Herzogtum Bielitz). The next owners of the Principality of Bielsko, members of the House of Sulkowski, had the right to the title of Herzog (Duke), during which time the remaining members of the family counted themselves amongst the lesser noble status of Fürst (Prince).

The Principality was till 1849 as autonomous principality in Austrian Silesia. After the 1920 division of Cieszyn Silesia between Poland and Czechoslovakia it became a part of Poland.

Its capital was in Bielsko, dukes were vassals of the King of Bohemia.

== Bibliography ==
- ŽÁČEK, Rudolf. Dějiny Slezska v datech. Praha: Libri, 2003. ISBN 80-7277-172-8.
