= Flag of the Duchy of Teschen =

Flag of the Duchy of Teschen

The flag of the Duchy of Teschen (Polish: Księstwo Cieszyńskie; Czech: Těšínské knížectví) was established in 2016 through the initiative of regional history enthusiasts in cooperation with the prominent Polish heraldic and vexillologist Alfred Znamierowski. The flag refers to the coat of arms and the historical banners of the Duchy of Teschen. The modern flag is an expression of respect for the history and tradition of the Duchy of Teschen, and also part of the different identities of the present inhabitants of the Cieszyn Silesia towards Lower and Upper Silesia.

== History ==
The oldest image of the Duchy of Teschen flag or banner was shown on the personal seal of the first duke, Mieszko I. That seal was attached to the document from 1297. The next premises of the flags, or rather ducal banners, date from the 14th century, and are associated with Duke Przemyslaw I Noszak who, from 1355, took an active part in political life of the Crown of Bohemia, becoming one of the most important figures in the court of the Czech rulers over time, i.e. Emperor Charles IV and King Wenceslas IV. Unfortunately, banners from this period have not survived to our times.

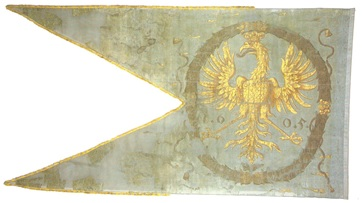
Historic banner of the Duchy of Teschen from 1605

The banner of the Duchy of Teschen, since 1605, remains the oldest preserved image of the ducal flag. The banner was ordered by Duke Adam Wenceslas, who, in 1605, was appointed commander of the Silesian army. (As a vassal of the Habsburgs, in their capacity of the Bohemian kings, he was involved in anti-Ottoman wars in territory of Hungary and Moravia.) The banner was made of blue satin and 160 x 240 cm in size. In the front part, there is a gold-painted eagle of the Duchy of Teschen, and the free part ends with two sharp tongues.

The ducal banners, which bore the image of golden eagles in a crown on a blue background, were used until the death of the last Piast ruler, Elizabeth Lucretia (†1653). From 1742, the official flag of the Duchy of Teschen was that of the Austrian Silesia, itself contained also Teschen/Cieszyn territory.

== Colours ==
The flag's colouring refers directly to the preserved iconographic messages of the dynastic coat of arms of the Teschen Piasts and the 17th century banner of the Duchy of Teschen. From the end of the 13th century, the shield of the dukes of Teschen was a golden eagle facing left in a blue field. From the 15th century, it was a golden crowned eagle, although the image of the crowned eagle appeared in the 14th century on the castle tiles during the Duke Premysl I Noszak era. Some foreign sources, such as the Stockholm Codex Bergshammar (from 1430 to 1436) show the Teschen eagle with a red beak, tongue, and claws. However, later sources, such as the Silesian Armorial (from 1577 to 1578), depict an eagle with only a red tongue emerging from the half-open beak, which is in the golden colour of the eagle. This unchangeability of the image and colours is confirmed by Siebmacher's Armorial, and a later description in the work of Jakob C. Spener. The contemporary flag of the Duchy of Teschen also refers to this colour scheme.

== Eagle ==
In the Duchy of Teschen, from the end of the 15th century, the crowned eagle appeared unceasingly on all ducal seals, coins, and banners, until the extinction of ducal family (1653). Thanks to the relations with the court of the last Jagiellon rulers of Poland-Lithuania during the 16th century, the image of the Teschen eagle on the Piast seals was modelled on the eagle from the crown seal of the Kingdom of Poland. The only differences were the form of the crown itself and the colours: on the head of the Polish eagle was the Renaissance-Baroque closed crown, while on the coat of arms of the Duchy of Teschen was the medieval open crown. It is important that the crowned eagle meant priority over the eagle (e.g. Upper Silesia, Lower Silesia), which could not be crowned. (In European heraldry, the crowned eagle is a state eagle and means sovereignty.) The eagle on the contemporary flag of the Duchy of Teschen is a direct representation of the 16th century version.
