= Gundaker, Prince of Liechtenstein =

Court official in Vienna (1580–1658)

Gundakar
- Prince of Liechtenstein
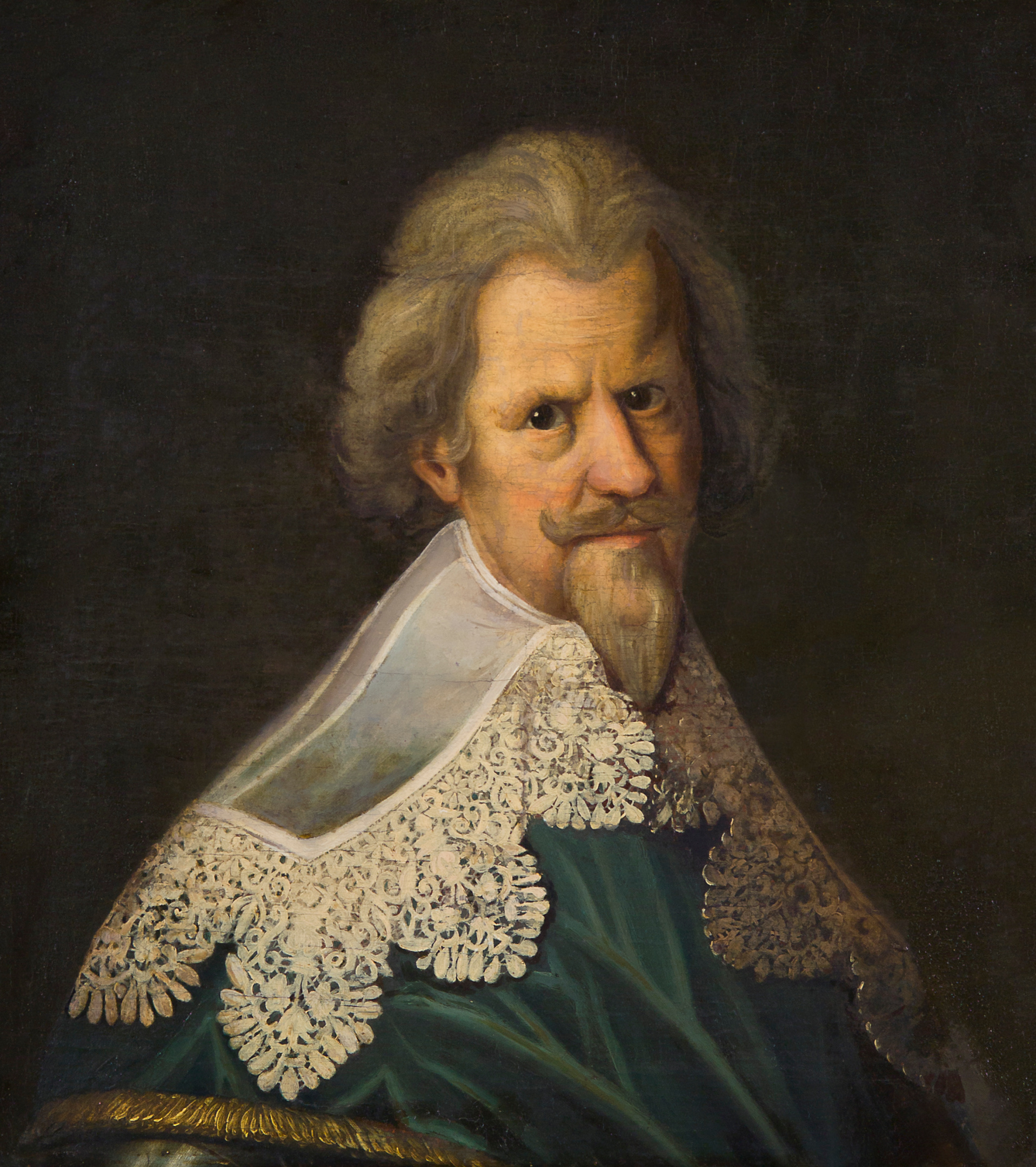
- Portrait c. 1640 (Liechtenstein Museum)
- Born: 30 January 1580; Lednice
- Died: 5 August 1658 (aged 78); Wilfersdorf Castle
- Noble family: Liechtenstein
- Spouses: Agnes of East Frisia (m. 1603; died 1616) Elizabeth Lucretia, Duchess of Cieszyn (m. 1618; died 1653)
- Issue: Juliana; Elizabeth; Maximiliana Constanza; Caesar; Johanna; Hartmann III; Anna; Maria Anna; Ferdinand John; Albert
- Father: Baron Hartmann II of Liechtenstein
- Mother: Countess Anna Maria of Ortenburg

Gundakar of Liechtenstein (30 January 1580 – 5 August 1658) (Prince from 1623) was a member of the House of Liechtenstein and as such the owner of a large estate. He also served the Habsburg dynasty.

== Family ==
He was the youngest son of Baron Hartmann II of Liechtenstein (1544–1585). His mother was Anna Maria (née Countess of Ortenburg). His brothers were Karl I and Maximilian. He received a careful education.

He himself was married twice. In the first marriage, he married Agnes, a daughter of Count Enno III of East Frisia and in the second marriage Elizabeth Lucretia, a daughter of Duke Adam Wenceslaus of Cieszyn and herself a ruling Duchess of Cieszyn. He was the founder of the so-called Gundakar line of the House of Liechtenstein. In 1606, the brothers signed a familial treaty stipulating that the first-born of the eldest surviving line would be head of the House of Liechtenstein.

== In Habsburg service ==
His father was a Lutheran and he had raised his children as Lutherans. At the beginning of the 17th century, Gundakar and his brothers converted to Catholicism. Gundakar wrote a vindication, entitled "Motives that moved me to accept the Catholic faith".

His conversion facilitated his ascent at the imperial court. He served under Emperors Matthias, Ferdinand II and Ferdinand III. He began his career at court in 1599 as chamberlain. In the following years he accompanied Archduke Matthias on military expeditions to Hungary and was present at the siege of Buda. In 1606, he served several times as an ambassador and in 1608, he accompanied Matthias on his campaign in Bohemia against Rudolf II. He became a councillor at the Exchequer in 1606 and he led the department from 1613. As early as 1608, he appears to have acted as Vice Chancellor of the Exchequer. He was also a councillor in the Chamber of Lower Austria. Between 1614 and 1617, he held various positions, including Land Marshal of Lower Austria, President of the Hofkammer, Chief Hofmeister to Archduke Charles John and Chief Hofmeister to the Empress Consort Anna of Tyrol.

His real political rise coincided with the beginning of the Thirty Years' War. In 1618 he led a delegation to the Estates of Silesia. His task was to prevent Silesia from joining the Bohemian Revolt. This attempt, however, failed. Then, at the beginning of the year 1619, he was sent as an ambassador to various princes, electors and prince-bishops to formally notify them of the death of Emperor Matthias. Informally, he would discuss the Bohemian Revolt. Secretly, he negotiated with Duke Maximilian I of Bavaria and other Catholic princes about military assistance to the Catholic League, in view of the impending war. In the same year, he undertook a second mission, to the spiritual electors, to prepare the election of Ferdinand II as the next emperor. He also visited Elector Palatine Frederick V, even though the court in Vienna already knew that Frederick was about to play an important role in the Bohemian revolt. Gundakar was present when Ferdinand was elected and continued to accompany him. He negotiated with the Upper Austrian Estates about their position with regards to the Bohemian Revolt. The Austrians did not formally break with Bohemia. After the Imperial victory, Gundakar was tasked with punishing the supporters of the rebellion in Upper Austria.

From 1621, he was a secret councillor and a close political adviser to the Emperor. Especially in the period before 1626, he was influential as the leader of the Privy Council. After 1625, he was Obersthofmeister. However, he was displaced from that position by Hans Ulrich von Eggenberg, who was a supporter of Wallenstein and leader of the "Spanish" party at the court. This turned Gundakar into an enemy of Wallenstein.

He authored several studies and two "Mirrors for princes". He proposed the creation of a Knight academy and argued for a reform of the administration. He also demanded that the state should promote the economy, in the sense of the early mercantilism, in order to increase tax revenue. This was apparently inspired by Giovanni Botero and other contemporary political theorists. Besides his official writings, he also published a work on the bridling of horses.

In 1623, he was raised to the rank of hereditary Imperial Prince.

== Counter-Reformation ==
His ideology was anti-Machiavellian and he was influenced by the Catholic Counter-Reformation. He donated gifts to many churches and monasteries and imposed Catholicism on his possessions. He created a staged surveillance apparatus to control the faith in his lands. This allowed him to displace Protestantism from his eastern Moravian possessions, despite resistance of the population.

== Possessions ==
When his father's inheritance was divided in 1598, he received the lordships Wilfersdorf and Ringelsdorf. In 1601, he issued a regulation for his subjects. He was so wealthy that he could grant loans to the state.

Like his two brothers, he contributed to the increase of his family's possessions. Like other Catholic noblemen loyal to the Emperor, he profited from the redistribution in 1619 of the dispossessed fiefs of the supporters of the Bohemian revolt. He was enfeoffed by Ferdinand II with the Lordship of Uherský Ostroh, as a reward for services rendered. In 1622, he purchased the Lordships of Ostrava and Moravský Krumlov. However, he paid with bad currency. Instead of 540000guilders, the actual value of his money was less than 70000guilders. The possessions he purchased were valued at about one million guilders.

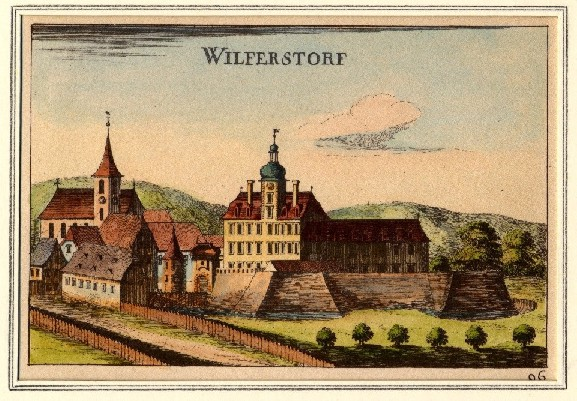
Wilfersdorf Castle, coloured copper engraving by Georg Matthäus Vischer, 1674

However, further attempts to increase the property failed. He laid a claim on the County of Rietberg, which had been owned by his first wife, Agnes of East Frisia. He was defeated, however, by Maximilian Ulrich von Kaunitz in a drawn-out legal battle. His second wife was a ruling Duchess of Cieszyn and he tried to pressure her into transferring Cieszyn to him. She retired to Silesia and informed her husband that if he was interested in continuing the marriage, he had to come to Cieszyn. After her death, Cieszyn reverted to the Bohemian crown as a completed fief.

Wilfersdorf was his favorite abode. He therefore had Wilfersdorf Castle converted into a water castle.

== Marriage and issue ==
Gundakar von Lichtenstein was twice married. He first married in 1603 with Countess Agnes of East Frisia (1 January 1584 – 28 February 1616). They had seven children:

- Juliana (1605–1658), married in 1636 Count Nikolaus Fugger of Nordendorf (1596–1676)
- Elizabeth (1606–1630)
- Maximiliana Constanza (3 January 1608 – 1642), married in 1630 Count Matthias of Thurn and Valsassina
- Caesar (1609–1610)
- Johanna (1611–1611)
- Hartmann III (9 February 1613 – 11 February 1686), Prince of Liechtenstein, married on 27 October 1640 Sidonie Elisabeth of Salm-Reifferscheidt (6 September 1623 – 23 September 1688). He had two sons:
  - Anton Florian, Prince of Liechtenstein (28 May 1656 – 11 October 1721)
  - Philipp Erasmus (11 September 1664 – 13 January 1704)
- Anna (1615–1654)

After the death of his first wife, he married in 1618 Elizabeth Lucretia, Duchess of Cieszyn (1 June 1599 – 19 May 1653). They had three children:

- Maria Anna (13 August 1621 – 1655), married in 1652 Wilhelm Heinrich Schlik, Count of Passaun and Weisskirchen (d. 1652)
- Ferdinand John (1622–1666), married Countess Dorothea Anna of Lodron (1619–1666)
- Albert (1625–1627)

== Ancestry ==
Ancestors of Gundaker, Prince of Liechtenstein

16. Baron Georg V of Liechtenstein
8. Baron Hartmann of Liechtenstein, Lord of Valtice
17. Baroness Agnes of Eckartsau
4. Baron Georg Hartmann of Liechtenstein, Lord of Valtice
18. Bernard, Lord of Mainburg
9. Johanna, Lady of Mainburg
19. Cunigunde, Lady of Pottendorff
2. Baron Hartmann II of Liechtenstein, Lord of Valtice, Lednice and Steyregg
20. Baron Heinrich VII of Liechtenstein
10. Baron Georg VI of Liechtenstein, Lord of Steyregg
21. Countess Agnes of Starhemberg
5. Baroness Susanna of Liechtenstein
22. Wolfgang IV, Baron of Polheim
11. Baroness Magdalena of Polheim
23. Baroness Johanna of Borsselen
1. Gundakar, Prince of Liechtenstein
24. Sebastian I, Count of Ortenburg
12. Ulrich II, Count of Ortenburg
25. Baroness Maria of Rohrbach-Neuburg
6. Karl I, Count of Ortenburg
26. Baron Hans of Aichberg-Laberweinting-Söldenau-Reichsdorf
13. Baroness Veronika of Aichberg
27. Baroness Siguna of Kraigk
3. Countess Anna Maria of Ortenburg
28. Count Siegmund of Fraunberg-Haag
14. Leonhard II of Fraunberg, Count of Haag
29. Baroness Margareta of Aichberg
7. Countess Maximiliana of Fraunberg-Haag
30. Friedrich V, Landgrave of Leuchtenberg
15. Landgravine Amalie of Leuchtenberg
31. Countess Dorothea of Rieneck
