= Elizabeth Lucretia, Duchess of Cieszyn =

Duchess regnant of Cieszyn (1599–1653)

Elizabeth Lucretia
- Duchess of Cieszyn
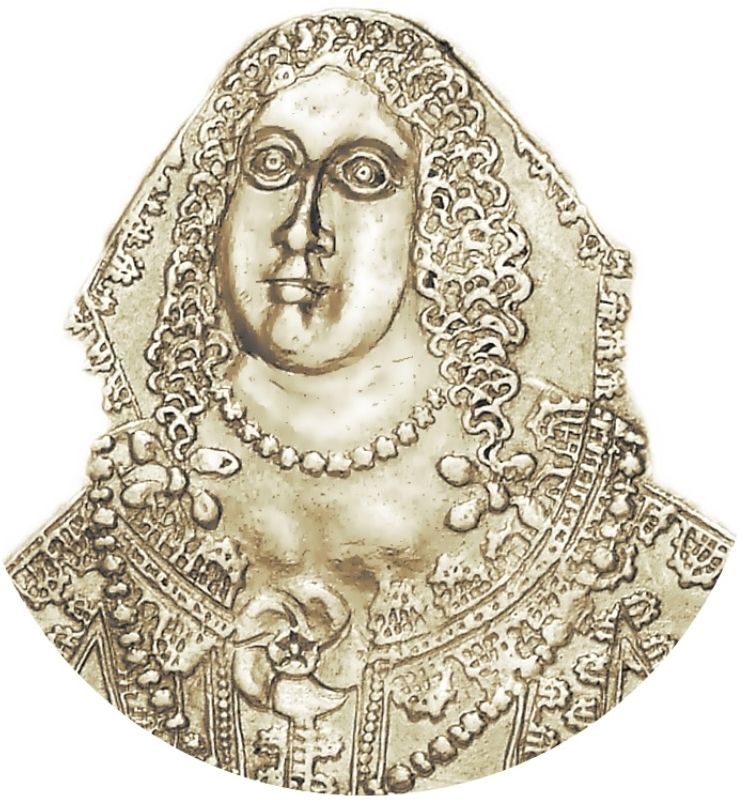
- Elisa(beth) Lucre(tia) D(ei) G(ratia) in Sile(sia) Tesch(inensis) ... Ducis(sa). Stylized duchess' portrait on a gold 5 ducat (1650)
- Born: 1 June 1599
- Died: 19 May 1653 (aged 53)
- Noble family: Piast
- Spouse: Gundakar, Prince of Liechtenstein
- Issue: Maria Anna of Liechtenstein; Ferdinand Johann of Liechtenstein; Albert of Liechtenstein
- Father: Adam Wenceslaus, Duke of Cieszyn
- Mother: Elisabeth Kettler

Elizabeth Lucretia of Cieszyn (German: Elisabeth Lukretia von Teschen; Polish: Elżbieta Lukrecja Cieszyńska; Czech: Alžběta Lukrécie Těšínská; 1 June 1599 – 19 May 1653), was a reigning Duchess of Cieszyn (Teschen, Těšín) from 1625 until her death. Born as the third child and second daughter of Adam Wenceslaus, Duke of Cieszyn (by his wife Princess Elisabeth Ketteler of Courland, daughter of Gotthard Kettler, Duke of Courland), she was the last ruler of Cieszyn from the Polish-origin Silesian Piast dynasty.

After her death, the Duchy of Cieszyn reverted to the Bohemian Crown as a completed fiefdom and was onward ruled directly by the Bohemian kings, then members of the House of Habsburg. Subsequently, Habsburg dynasty bore the title until the fall of the Empire and the liquidation of the Duchy of Cieszyn in 1918.

== Life ==
Originally raised in the Lutheran faith, in 1610 she converted to the Catholicism, together with her whole family.

On 13 July 1617 her father, Adam Wenceslaus, died and was succeeded by his only surviving son, Frederick William. On 23 April 1618 Elizabeth Lucretia was married against her will with the also ex-Lutheran Gundakar of Liechtenstein, a widower almost twenty years her senior. Gundakar was a younger brother of Karl I, Duke of Opava (Troppau) and Krnov (Jägerndorf), one of the members of the Regency council who ruled the Duchy of Cieszyn during Frederick William's absence; however, this arrangement was short-lived, and the de facto rule was held by Elizabeth Lucretia, even after Frederick William returned to Cieszyn and assumed the effective government in 1624, because the Duke almost immediately after his return made a trip with the Emperor to the Dutch Republic. During this journey, Frederick William became suddenly ill and died on 19 August 1625 in Cologne, unmarried and without legitimate issue.

Initially, Emperor Ferdinand II tried to join Cieszyn to his domains, using his rights as King of Bohemia; but the end, he accepted Elizabeth Lucretia as reigning Duchess, by right of the Privilege granted by King Vladislaus II of Bohemia to Duke Casimir II of Cieszyn in 1498, under which was secured the female succession over Cieszyn until the fourth generation.

During her reign, Cieszyn passed through one of the most difficult periods in his history. It was the Thirty Years' War, during which Cieszyn was regularly plundered by foreign forces (during 1626–27 by Danish troops of Ernst von Mansfeld, during 1642–43 and 1645–47 by Swedish troops under the commands of Colonel Rochowa and General Königsmarck, respectively), both in terms of infrastructure and finances. In addition plague and hunger also affected the Duchy and many citizens died. Eventually, this led to Cieszyn being economically and demographically destroyed for the next 100 years. Elizabeth Lucretia's life was seriously threatened on several occasions: for example, in 1642, when she had to find refuge in Jablunkov and in 1645, when she escaped to Kęty, after the Swedish forces took the capital (which capitulated only in 1646). Only the Peace of Westphalia on 24 October 1648 finally established the peace in her domains.

The marriage of the Duchess with Gundakar of Liechtenstein proved to be unsuccessful, despite the fact that they had three children together. In 1626 they were formally separated, and remained in this way until her death.

Elizabeth Lucretia died on 19 May 1653, and was buried in the Ducal crypt in the Dominican church in Cieszyn.

== Children ==
Elizabeth and Gundakar had three children:

- Maria Anna of Liechtenstein (13 August 1621 – 5 October 1655)
- Ferdinand Johann of Liechtenstein (27 December 1622 – 9 January 1666)
- Albert of Liechtenstein (8 March 1625 – 1627)

== Ancestry ==
Ancestors of Elizabeth Lucretia, Duchess of Cieszyn

16. Casimir II, Duke of Cieszyn
8. Wenceslaus II, Duke of Cieszyn
17. Johanna of Poděbrady
4. Wenceslaus III Adam, Duke of Cieszyn
18. Frederick I, Margrave of Brandenburg-Ansbach
9. Anna of Brandenburg-Ansbach
19. Sophia of Poland
2. Adam Wenceslaus, Duke of Cieszyn
20. Magnus I, Duke of Saxe-Lauenburg
10. Francis I, Duke of Saxe-Lauenburg
21. Catherine of Brunswick-Wolfenbüttel
5. Sidonia Catharina of Saxe-Lauenburg
22. Henry IV, Duke of Saxony
11. Sibylle of Saxony
23. Catherine of Mecklenburg
1. Elizabeth Lucretia, Duchess of Cieszyn
24. Gotthard Kettler, Herr zu Neu-Assen
12. Gotthard Kettler, Herr zu Neu-Assen-Melrich
25. Margareta van Bronckhorst-Batenburg
6. Gotthard Kettler, Duke of Courland
Willem van Nesselrode
13. Sophie of Nesselrode
Eliabeth Nyt van Birgel
3. Elisabeth Kettler of Courland
28. Magnus II, Duke of Mecklenburg
14. Albert VII, Duke of Mecklenburg
29. Sophie of Pomerania-Wolgast
7. Anna of Mecklenburg
30. Joachim I Nestor, Elector of Brandenburg
15. Anna of Brandenburg
31. Elizabeth of Denmark

== Notes ==
Elizabeth Lucretia, Duchess of Cieszyn House of Piast Born: 1 June 1559 Died: 19 May 1653
Regnal titles
Preceded by Frederick William	Duchess of Cieszyn; 1625–1653	Reversion to the Crown of Bohemia
