= Duchy of Teschen =

Silesian duchy (1281–1918)

Coordinates: 49°44′59″N 18°37′46″E

Duchy of Teschen: Księstwo Cieszyńskie (Polish); Těšínské knížectví (Czech); Herzogtum Teschen (German); Ducatus Tessinensis (Latin)
- 1290–1918
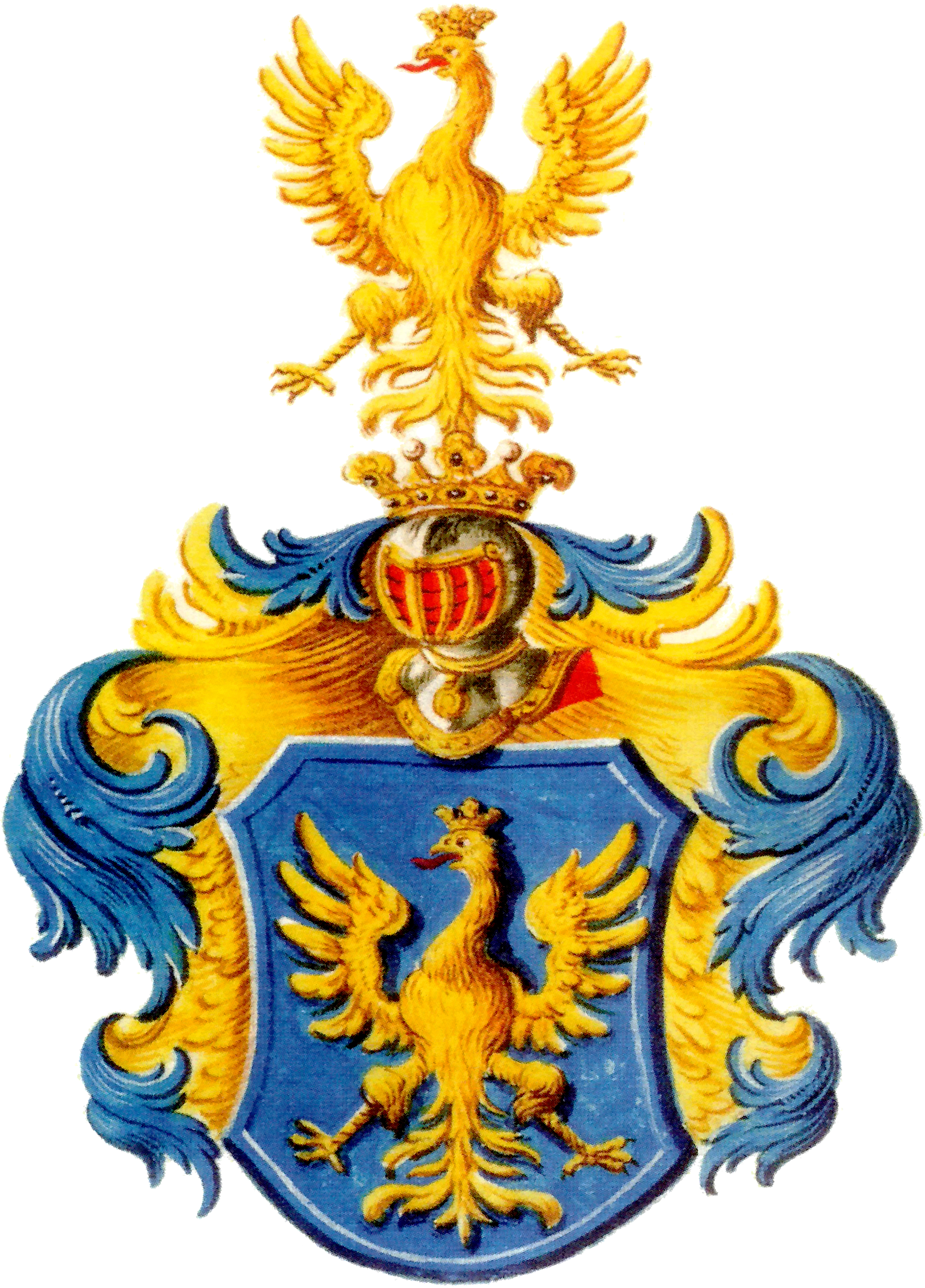
- Flag Coat of arms^{1}

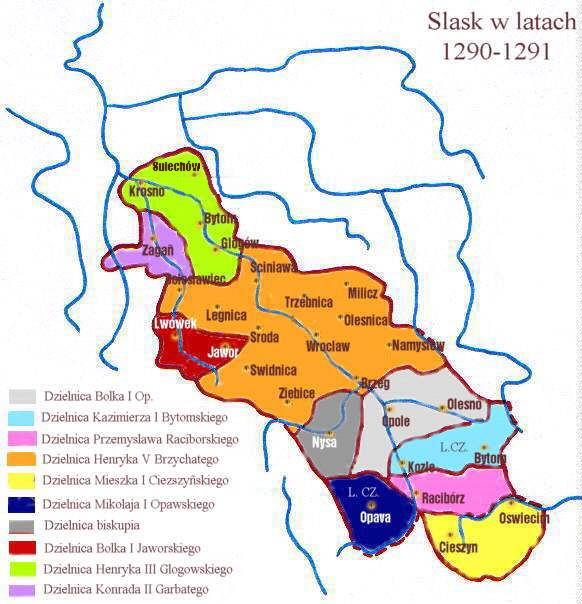
- Silesia duchies in 1290–91: Teschen under Mieszko I in yellow
- Status: Silesian duchy Fiefdom of Bohemia (from 1327); Part of the Bohemian Crown (from 1348)
- Capital: Cieszyn
- Common languages: Latin (officially); Czech and German (later); Polish (popularly)
- Religion: Lutheranism; Roman Catholicism
- Dukes
  - 1290–1315: Mieszko I (first duke)
  - 1625–1653: Elizabeth Lucretia (last Piast ruler)
  - 1895–1918: Archduke Frederick Habsburg (last duke)
- History
  - Partitioned from Opole-Racibórz: 1281
  - Split off Oświęcim: 1315
  - Vassalized by Bohemia: 1327
  - Split off Bielsko: 1572
  - Habsburg rule: 1653
  - Part of Austrian Silesia: 1742/45
  - Disestablished: 1918
  - Spa Conference: 28 July 1920

Population
  - 1910: 350,000
Preceded by	Succeeded by
Duchy of Opole and Racibórz	First Czechoslovak Republic; Second Polish Republic
- ^{1} Coat of arms of the Duchy of Teschen and the regional branch of the Piast dynasty

The Duchy of Teschen (German: Herzogtum Teschen), also Duchy of Cieszyn (Polish: Księstwo Cieszyńskie) or Duchy of Těšín (Czech: Těšínské knížectví), was one of the Duchies of Silesia centered on Cieszyn (Teschen) in Upper Silesia. It was split off the Silesian Duchy of Opole and Racibórz in 1281 during the feudal division of Poland and was ruled by Silesian dukes of the Piast dynasty from 1290 until the line became extinct with the death of Duchess Elizabeth Lucretia in 1653.

The ducal lands initially comprised former Lesser Polish territories east of the Biała River, which in about 1315 again split off as the Polish Duchy of Oświęcim, while the remaining duchy became a fiefdom of the Bohemian kings in 1327 and was incorporated into the Lands of the Bohemian Crown in 1348. While the bulk of Silesia was conquered by the Prussian king Frederick the Great in the Silesian Wars of 1740–1763, Teschen together with the duchies of Troppau (Opava), Krnov and Nysa remained with the Habsburg monarchy and merged into the Austrian Silesia crown land in 1849. The so-called "commander line" of the Habsburg-Lorraine dynasty, a cadet branch descending from Archduke Charles, Duke of Teschen, held the title "Duke of Teschen" until 1918.

== History ==
The duchy shared the history of the Cieszyn Silesia region, and also in part that of Silesia in general: the Teschen area was the south-easternmost part of the medieval Duchy of Silesia, a Polish province established upon the death of Duke Bolesław III Wrymouth in 1138. According to his testament, the Silesian lands were to be ruled by his eldest son Władysław II, who became the progenitor of the Silesian Piasts. Though he was exiled by his younger half-brothers after he had tried to gain control over Poland as a whole, his sons, backed by Emperor Frederick Barbarossa, were able to return and to secure their Silesian inheritance. In 1172 they divided the heritage: the Upper Silesian lands with the Cieszyn area stretching up to the Beskid Mountains fell to the second son Mieszko I Tanglefoot, who ruled as Duke of Racibórz.

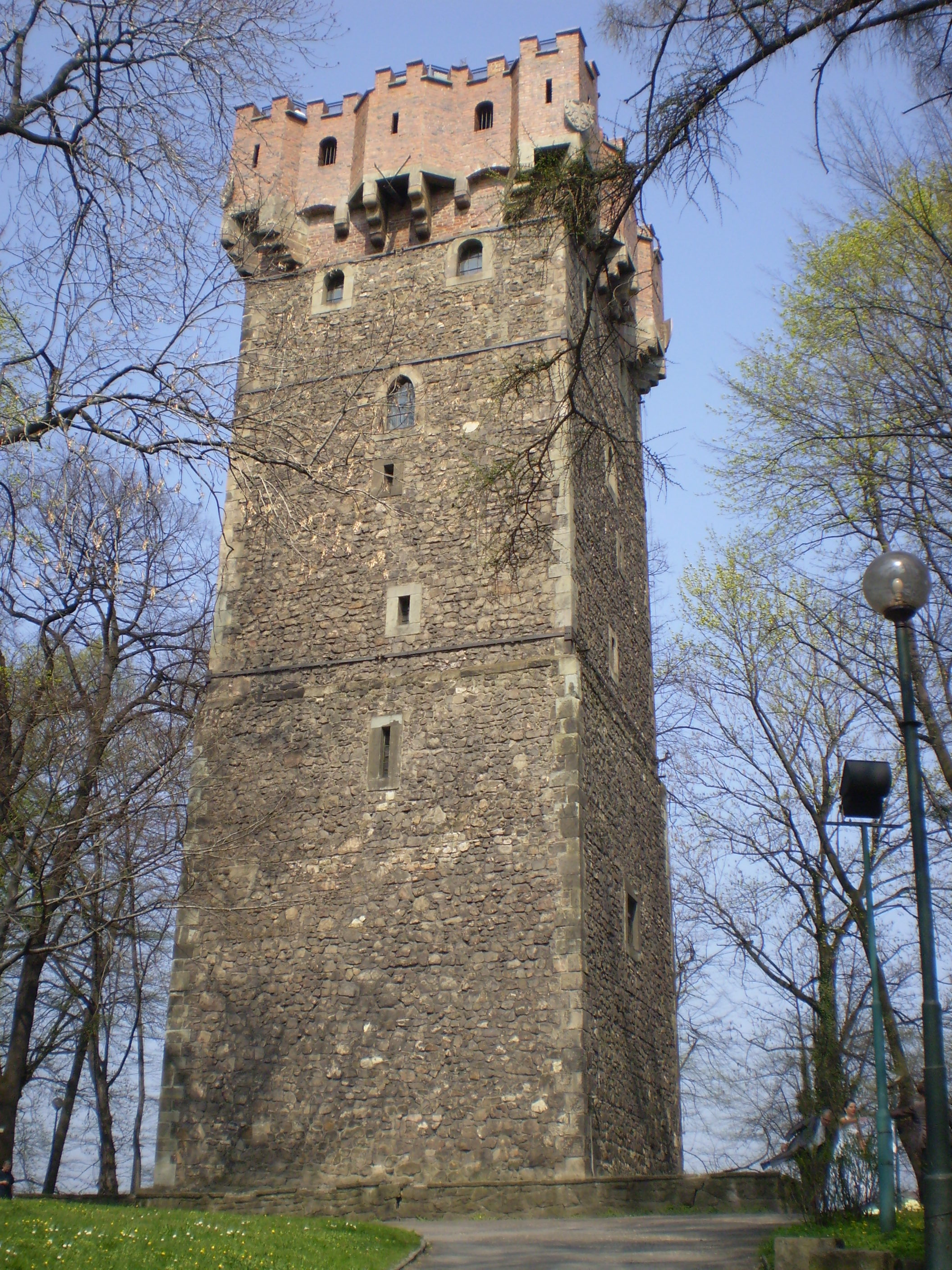
Piast castle tower in Cieszyn, part of the former ducal residence

Defying the Polish agnatic seniority principle, Mieszko Tanglefoot in 1202 occupied the neighbouring Duchy of Opole from his nephew Henry the Bearded, forming the united Upper Silesian Duchy of Opole and Racibórz. His descendants ruled Upper Silesia until the death of Mieszko's grandson Duke Władysław Opolski in 1281, whereafter Opole-Racibórz was again divided among his four sons. The eldest, Mieszko, initially ruled the Duchy of Racibórz with Cieszyn and Oświęcim, jointly with his minor brother Przemysław. After another partition in 1290, Mieszko took his residence in Cieszyn and became the first Duke of Teschen.

=== Piast rule ===
Like most of his Silesian Piast relatives, Mieszko approached the kings of Bohemia; during the Polish internal struggles after the death of High Duke Leszek II, in 1291, he and his younger brother Duke Bolko I of Opole signed a support agreement with King Wenceslaus II. Mieszko also had the Teschen lands on the Vistula and Biała rivers and the Beskid foothills settled by German immigrants. He colonised the remote parts of his duchy and vested Cieszyn, Oświęcim, Zator, Skoczów and Karviná with town privileges. His adhered to the alliance with Bohemia even after in 1310 the House of Luxembourg assumed the throne in Prague.

After Mieszko's death in 1315, his son Władysław took the lands east of the Biała river where he established the separate Duchy of Oświęcim, which eventually became a fief of the Polish Crown. His brother Casimir I retained the western part and in 1327 swore homage to King John of Bohemia. After that Teschen became an autonomous fiefdom of the Bohemian kings and part of the Crown of Bohemia. Local Piast rulers often possessed other lands outside the duchy itself, as the Duchy of Siewierz, half of Głogów and some parts of Bytom.

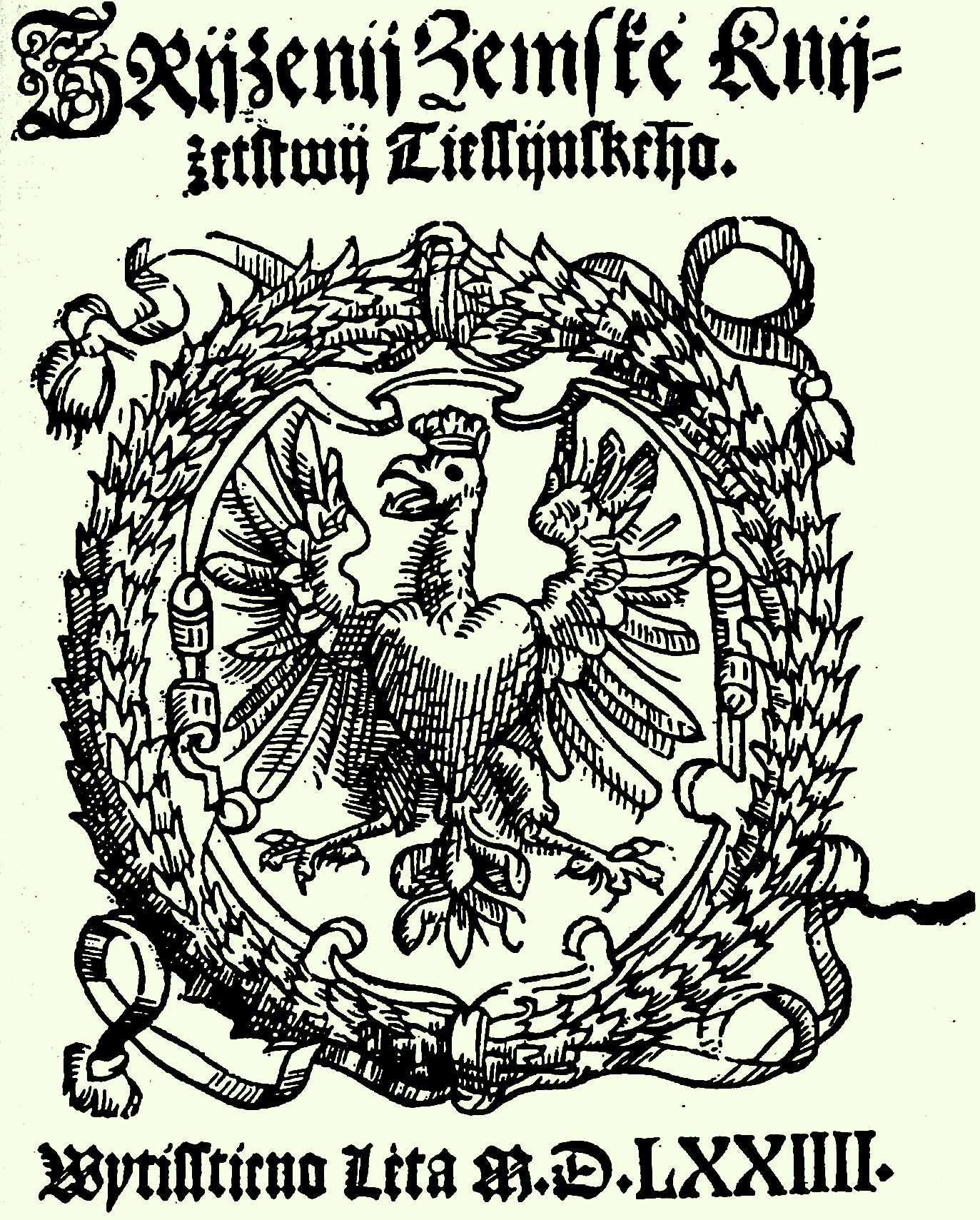
Title page of the Constitution of the Duchy of Teschen (printed in Czech), issued by Duke Wenceslaus III Adam in 1573

After the death of Duke Bolesław I in 1431, the rule over the duchy was shared by his wife Euphemia and their four sons. In 1442 the duchy was divided between the brothers who all bore the ducal title; nevertheless, the real control over the duchy passed to Boleslaus II and Przemyslaus II, who after the death of Boleslaus II in 1452 ruled alone. From the late 15th century onwards, the Beskid valleys in the south were settled by Vlach peasants from neighbouring Moravian Wallachia.

While the Lands of the Bohemian Crown passed to the Habsburg dynasty in 1526, the Duchy of Teschen during the reign of Duke Wenceslaus III Adam, from 1528 onwards, shifted to Protestantism. Influenced by the Moravian governor John of Pernstein, his tutor and father-in-law, he turned to the Lutheran faith in 1540 and his subjects had to follow according to the cuius regio, eius religio rule. In 1560, still during his lifetime, he ceded the Duchy of Bielsko with Karviná and Frýdek to his son and heir Frederick Casimir. Nevertheless, Frederick died already in 1571 and his father, struggling with financial problems, had to sell Bielsko as a state country to the Princes of Pless. The remaining duchy passed to the only surviving son Adam Wenceslaus, who in 1610 shifted back to Roman Catholicism for the sake of political advantage and enacted several Counter-Reformation measures. Indeed, Emperor Matthias appointed him Silesian governor in 1617, however, he died a few months later.

The Cieszyn Piast rule continued until 1653, when the male line became extinct with the death of Adam Wenceslaus' son Frederick William amidst the Thirty Years' War in 1625. The intentions of the Habsburg rulers to seize the duchy as a reverted fief were initially thwarted by his surviving sister, Duchess Elizabeth Lucretia, who began a lengthy lawsuit on her heritage. Nevertheless, when she died in 1653, the duchy passed directly to the Bohemian monarchs, at that time the Habsburg emperor Ferdinand III and his son King Ferdinand IV.

=== Habsburg rule ===
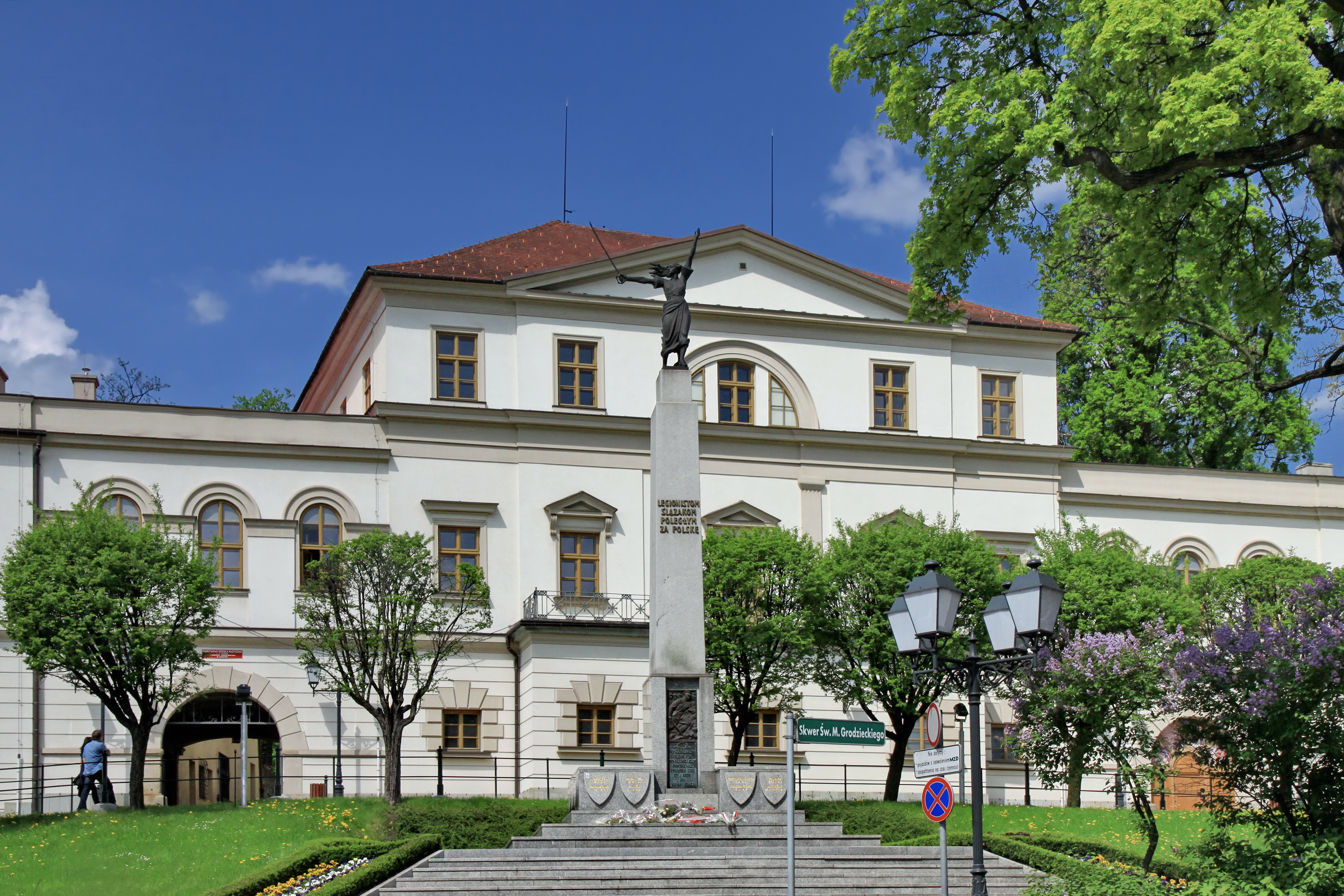
Archducal palace in Cieszyn

Ferdinand IV ruled Teschen until his death in 1654, whereafter the duchy fell back to Emperor Ferdinand III. His Habsburg successors continued the re-Catholicization policies. In 1722 Emperor Charles VI separated Teschen from the Bohemian Crown and granted the duchy to Duke Leopold of Lorraine, whose son Francis I was to marry Charles's daughter Maria Theresa. Leopold had unsuccessfully claimed his maternal grandmother's rights to the north Italian Duchy of Montferrat, which Charles had taken and given to the Dukes of Savoy in 1708 as part of their alliance pact. Once Holy Roman Emperor, Francis had to face the attack by the Prussian king Frederick the Great, who after the 1742 Peace of Breslau took the bulk of Silesia, while Teschen remained with the Habsburg Monarchy. In 1766 Teschen passed to Francis' eldest surviving daughter, Archduchess Maria Christina and her husband Prince Albert of Saxony, who thus became known colloquially as the Duke of Saxe-Teschen.

Although most of Silesia had passed to Prussia, Teschen with Bielsko and the duchies of Krnov (Jägerndorf), Opava (Troppau) and southern part of episcopal Nysa (Neisse) remained under Habsburg control and passed to the newly established Austrian Empire in 1804. Archduchess Maria Christina had died in 1798 and as her marriage remained childless, upon the death of the widowed Albert in 1822 the duchy passed to their adopted son, Archduke Charles of Austria, who assumed the title of Herzog von Teschen and became progenitor of the Teschen cadet branch of the Habsburg-Lorraine dynasty. While the Duchy of Teschen finally merged into the crown land of Austrian Silesia after the Revolutions of 1848, the ducal title passed down Charles' line, first to his eldest son, Archduke Albert, and then in 1895 to Albert Frederick's nephew, Archduke Frederick.

With Austrian Silesia, the territory of Teschen became part of the Cisleithanian half of the Austro-Hungarian dual monarchy upon the Compromise of 1867. At the end of World War I both the crown land and the ducal title were disestablished with the dissolution of Austria-Hungary. Archduke Frederick, appointed Austrian field marshal in 1914 but soon neutralized by Chief-of-Staff Franz Conrad von Hötzendorf, found his vast possessions expropriated and retired to Magyaróvár in Hungary.

=== Aftermath ===
At the end of the war, local Polish and Czechoslovak self-governments were established in the territory of Cieszyn, which on 5 November 1918 signed an interim agreement under which the territory – including the town of Cieszyn itself – was divided along the Olza (Olše, Olsa) River. However, the preliminary convention failed to settle the border conflict between the newly established state of Czechoslovakia and the Second Polish Republic, which claimed further areas of the former Cieszyn duchy with a predominantly Polish-speaking population. The ongoing conflict escalated when Czechoslovak troops crossed the Olza on 23 January 1919, starting the Polish–Czechoslovak War.

Clashes of arms continued until 31 January, but neither of the belligerents benefited: at the 1920 Spa Conference the division of the former duchy along the Olza was confirmed. The eastern part of Cieszyn Silesia was incorporated into the Polish Autonomous Silesian Voivodeship, while the western part (including the Trans-Olza region) became part of Czechoslovakia. This was confirmed on 5 August 1920 by the Conference of Ambassadors. After World War II the remaining German population was expelled.

== Demographics ==
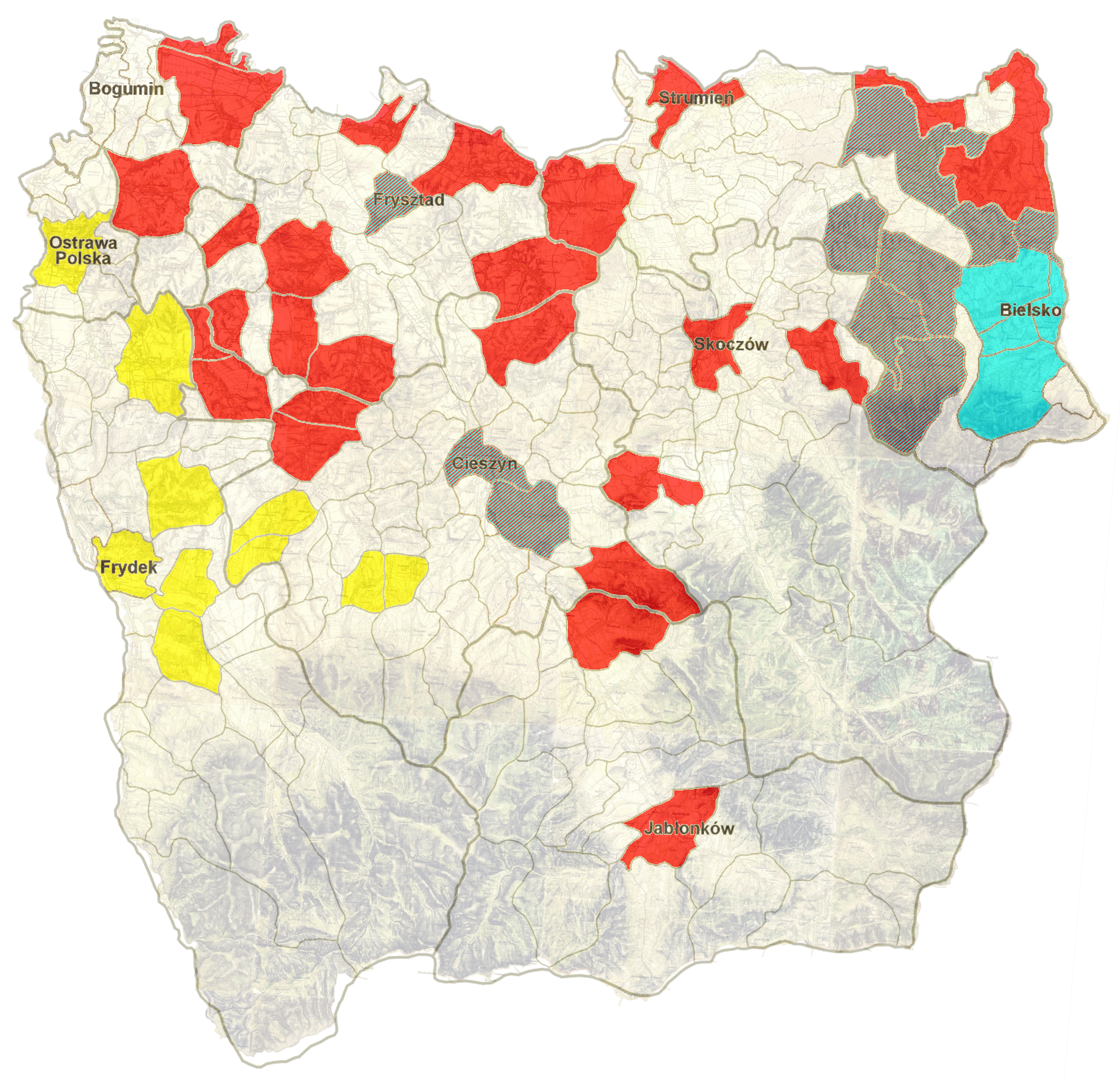
Languages of sermons in Roman Catholic parishes in the 17th century (red - Polish, yellow - Czech, blue - German, striped - Polish and German

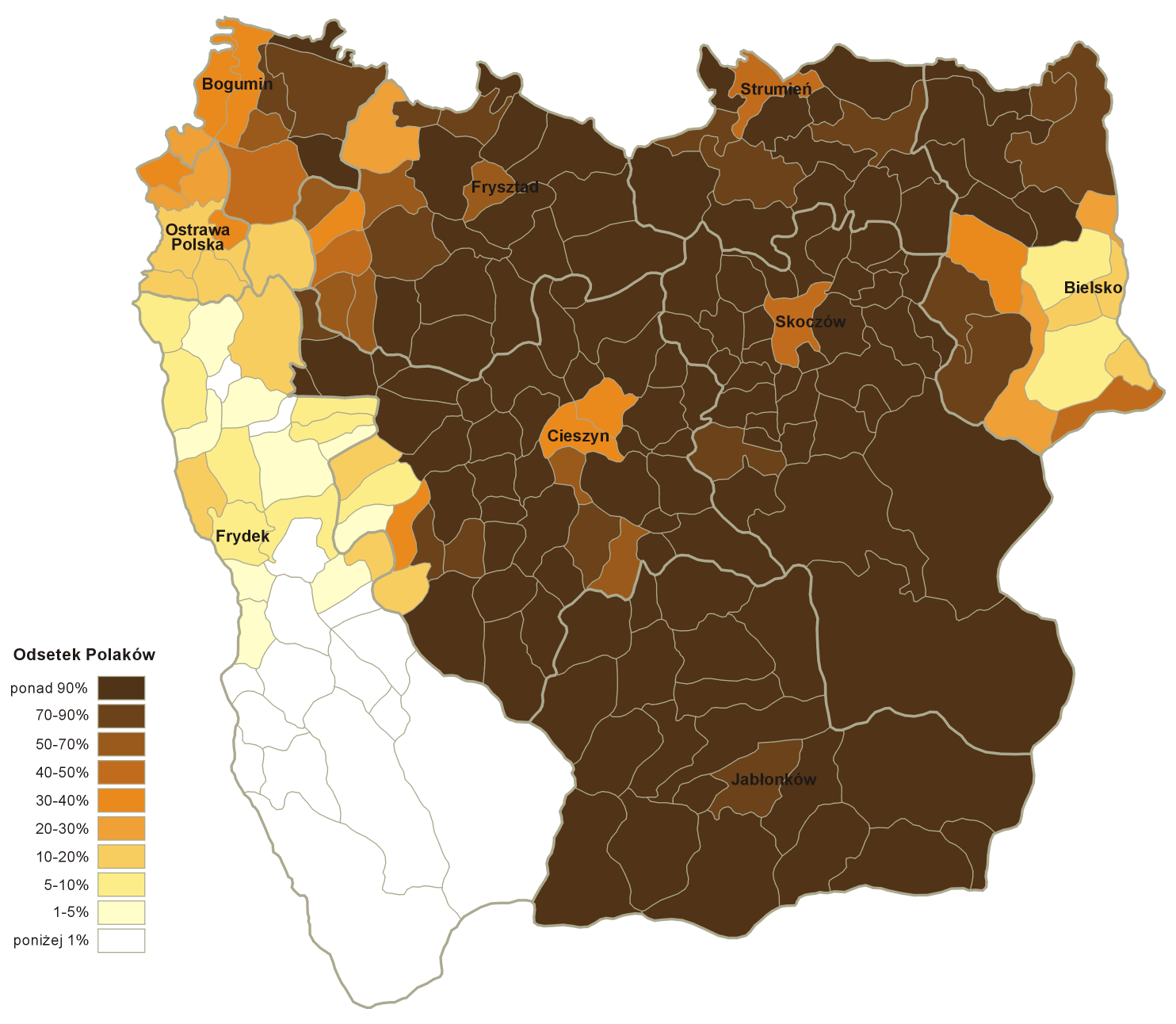
1910 Austrian census - percentage of Polish-speaking population

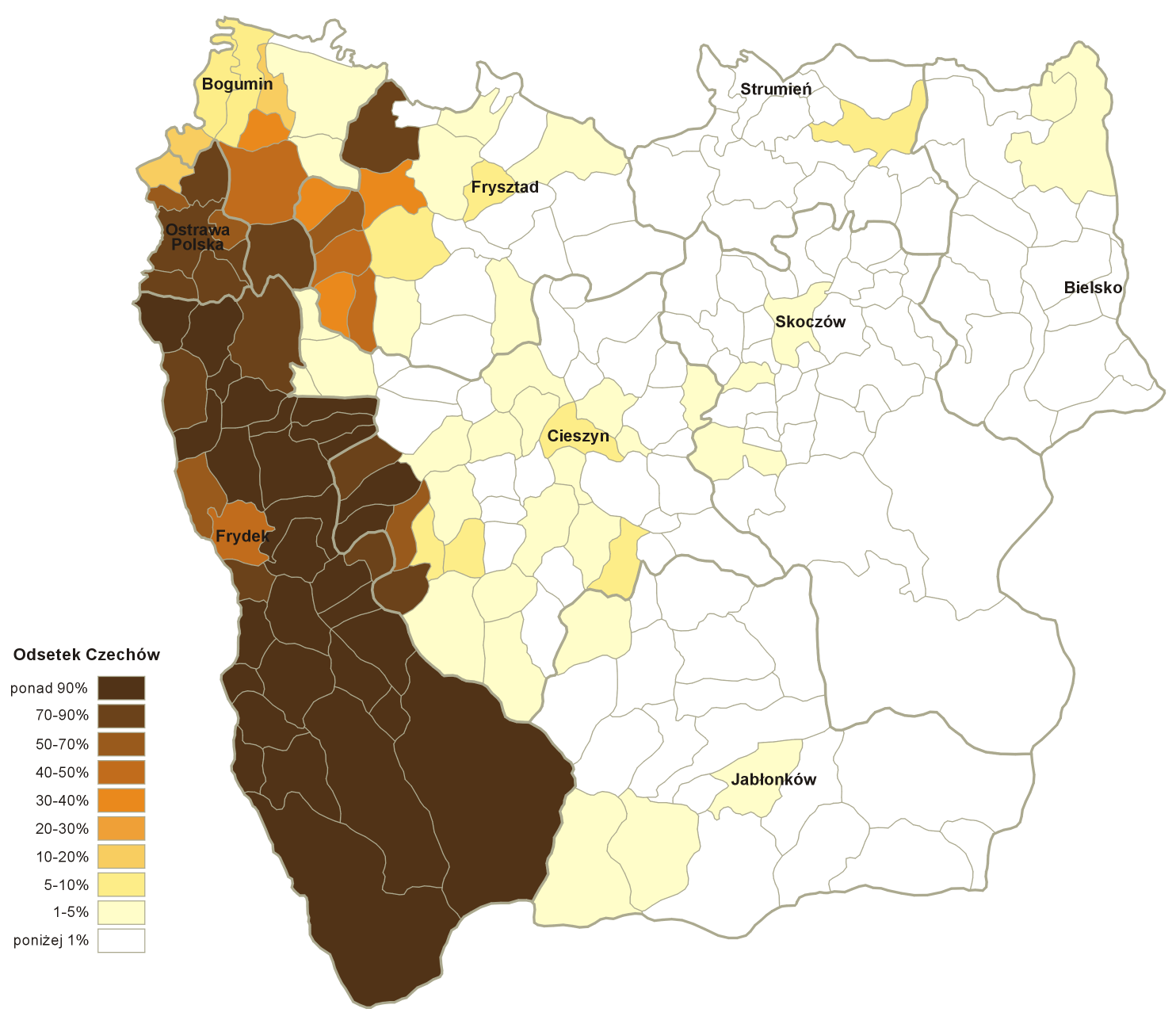
1910 Austrian census - percentage of Czech-speaking population

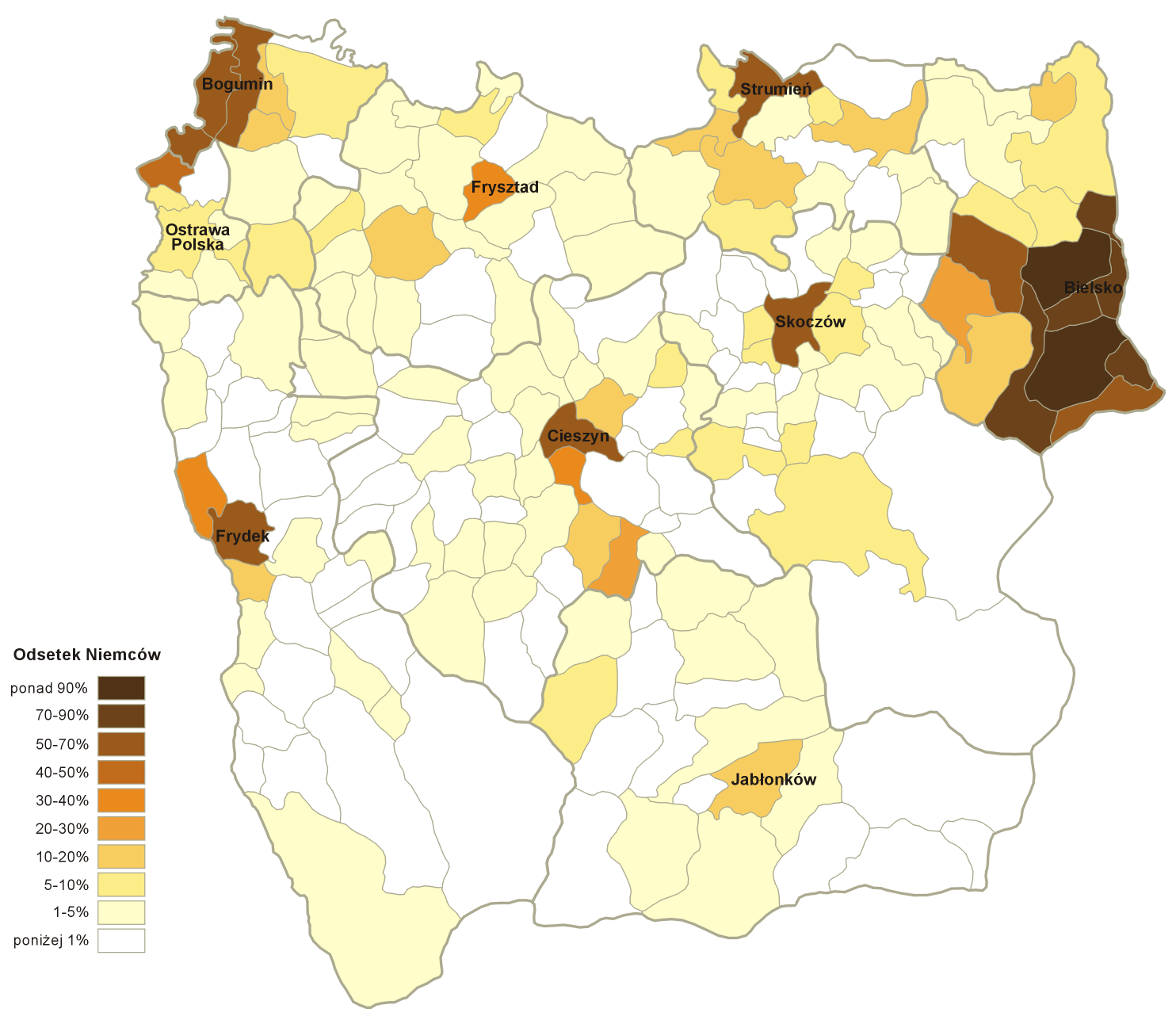
1910 Austrian census - percentage of German-speaking population

According to the Austrian census taken in 1910, the duchy had about 350,000 inhabitants: 54.8% Polish-speaking, 27.1% Czech-speaking and 18.1% German-speaking. While the Czech population mainly settled in the western areas around Frýdek, the German population was clustered around Bielsko (German: Bielitz).

== Dukes of Teschen ==
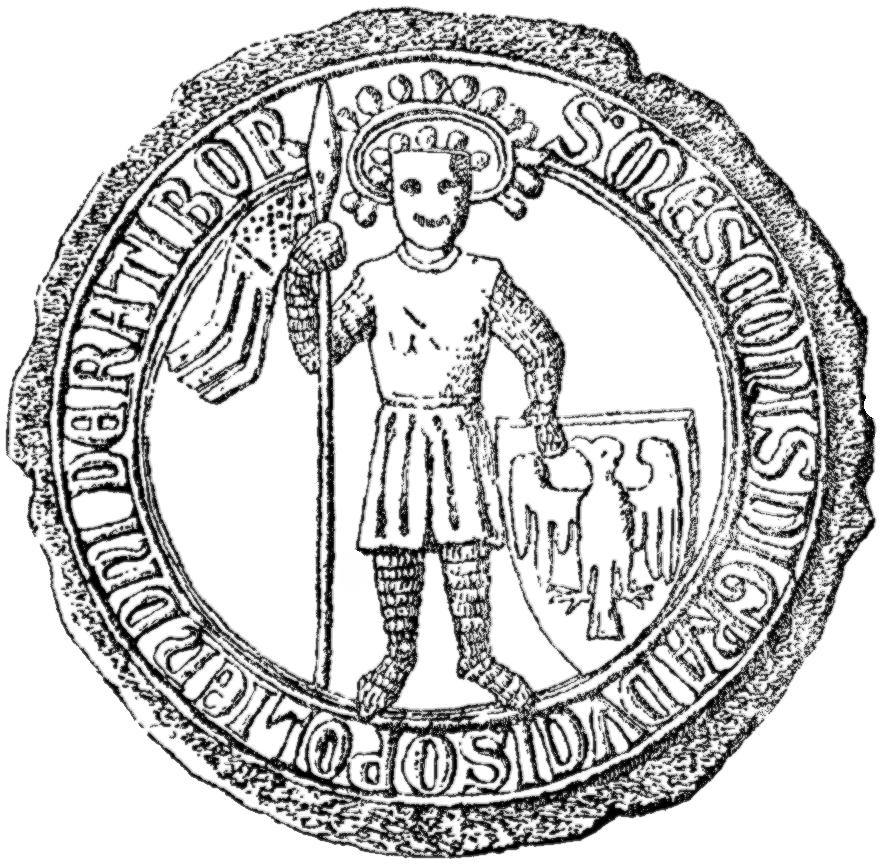
Seal of the first Duke Mieszko I (1288)

=== Silesian Piasts ===
- 1290–1315 Mieszko I
- 1315–1358 Casimir I, son, swore homage to King John of Bohemia in 1327
- 1358–1410 Przemyslaus I Noszak, son
- 1410–1431 Boleslaus I, son
- 1431–1442 Wenceslaus I, became Duke of Siewierz and Bielsko
- 1431–1442 Wladislaus, Duke of Głogów
- 1431–1452 Boleslaus II
- 1431–1477 Przemyslaus II
- 1477–1528 Casimir II
  - 1518–1524 Wenceslaus II, son, co-ruler with his father
- 1528–1579 Wenceslaus III Adam, son of Wenceslaus II
- 1579–1617 Adam Wenceslaus, son
- 1617–1625 Frederick William, son, left no male heirs
- 1625–1653 Elizabeth Lucretia, sister.

Following the death of Elizabeth Lucretia, Teschen reverted to the royal domain of Bohemia. In 1722, Emperor Charles VI, as King of Bohemia, vested his cousin Leopold of Lorraine with the ducal title.

=== House of Habsburg-Lorraine ===
- 1722–1729 Leopold
- 1729–1765 Francis I Stephen, son, husband of Maria Theresa, Holy Roman Emperor from 1745
- 1765–1766 Emperor Joseph II, son
- 1766–1797 Archduchess Maria Christina
  - 1766–1822 Prince Albert Casimir, husband
- 1822–1847 Charles, nephew and adoptive son
- 1847–1849 Albert, son

Titular dukes

- 1849–1895 Albert
- 1895–1918 Frederick, nephew, title abolished in Austrian law in 1918.
- Archduke Albrecht Franz, Duke of Teschen (1897–1955) continued to use the title after the death of his father.

== Old maps ==
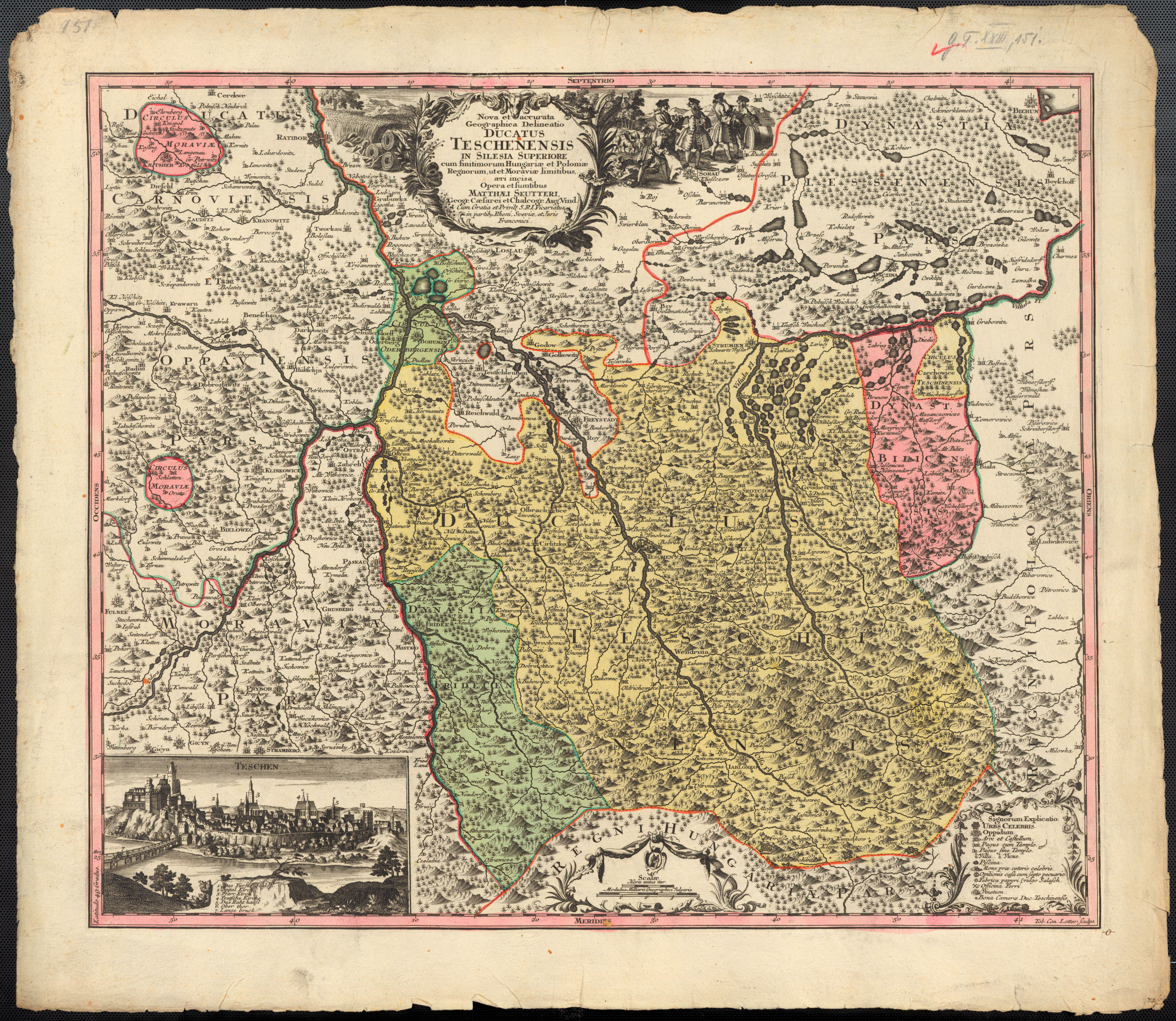
The Duchy of Teschen: 17th/18th century map by Matthäus Seutter

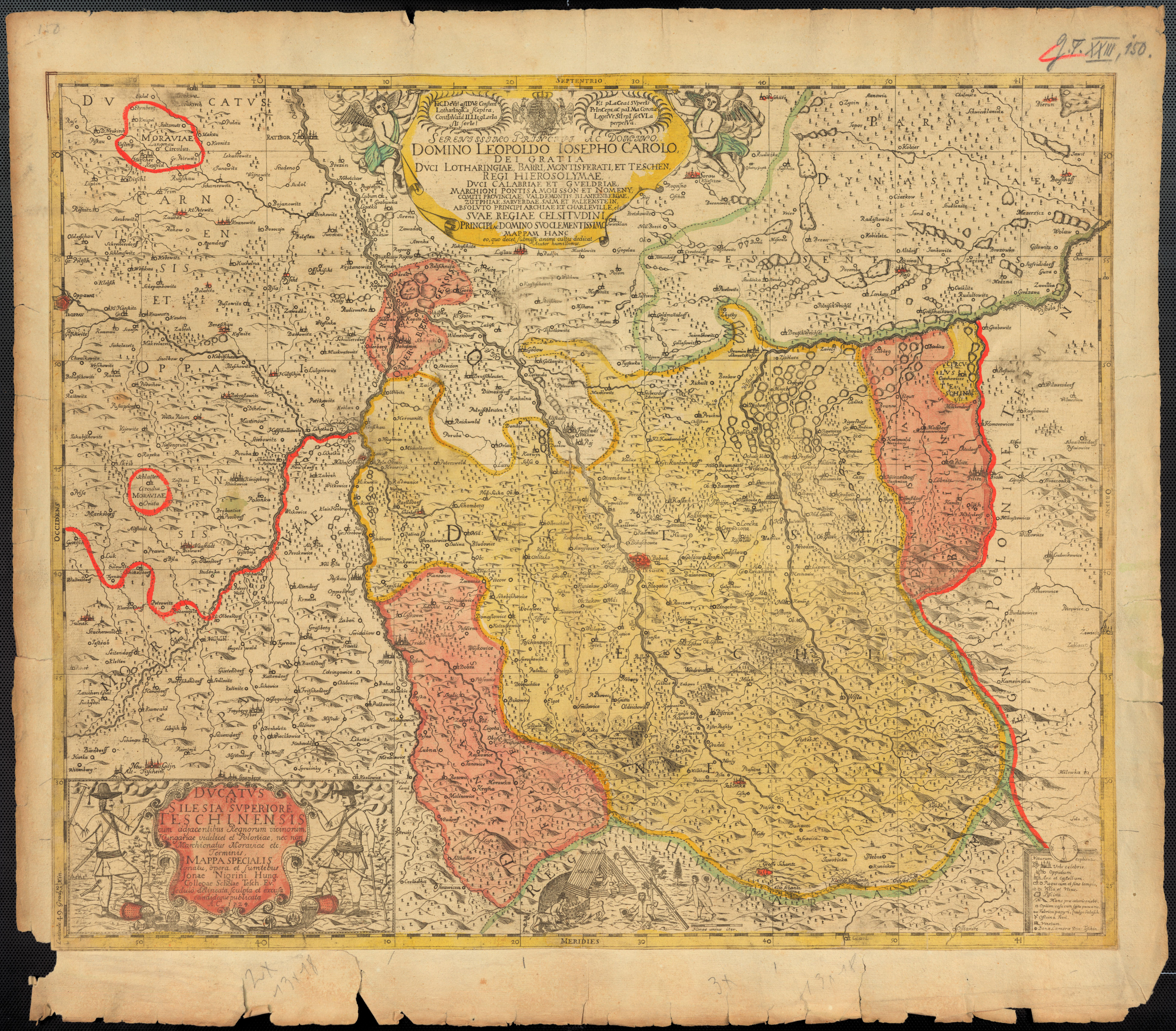
The Duchy of Teschen in 1724, by Jonas Nigrinus

The Duchy of Teschen in 1736, by Matthaeus Schubarth

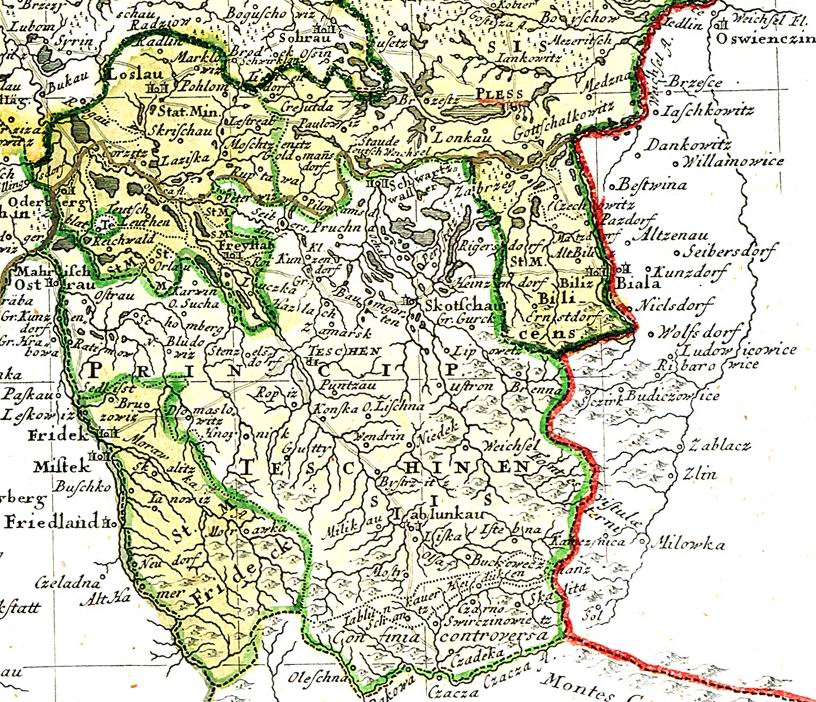
The Duchy of Teschen. 1746 map by Johann Homann

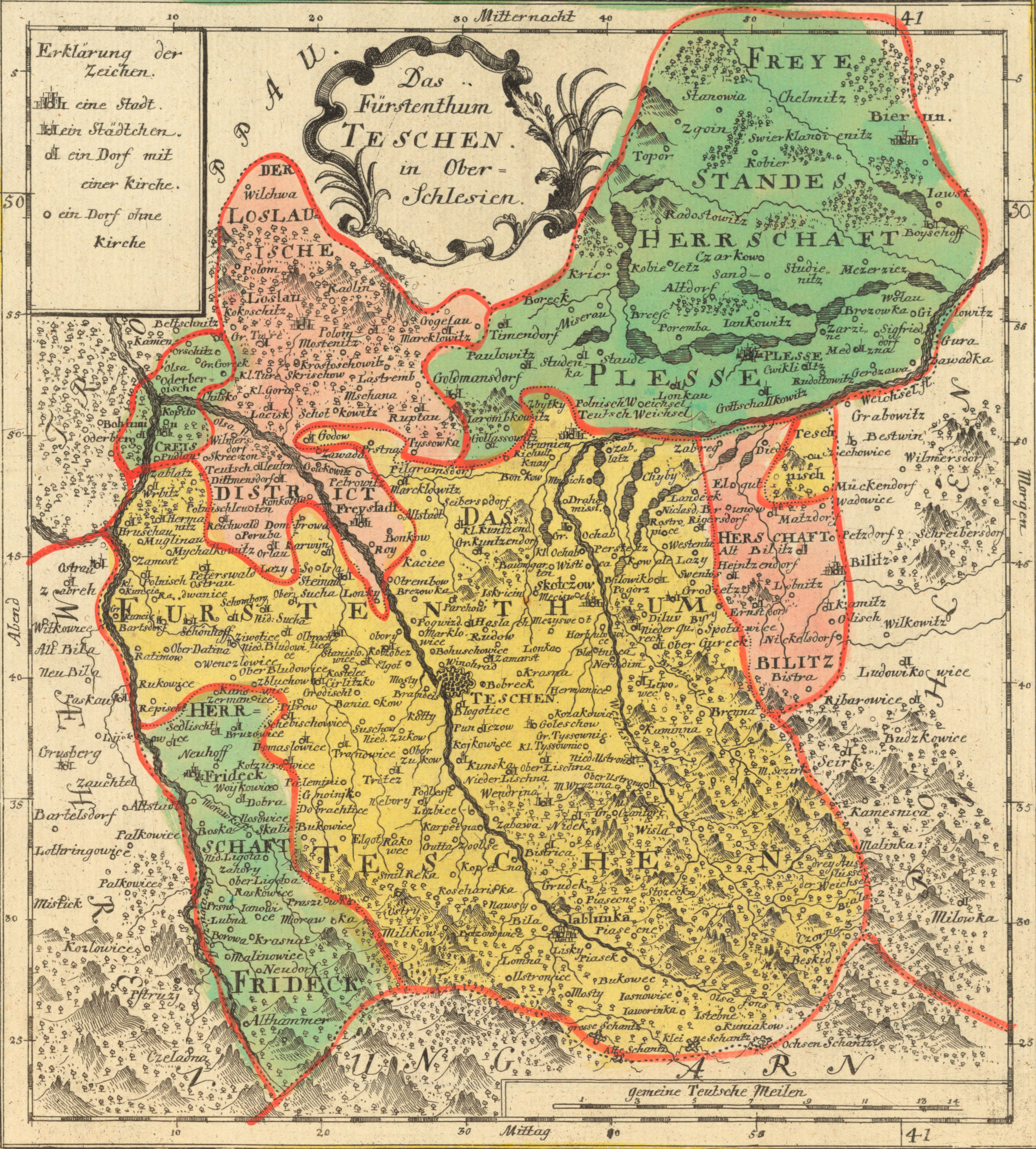
17th/18th century map of the Duchy of Teschen by Joh David Schleuen

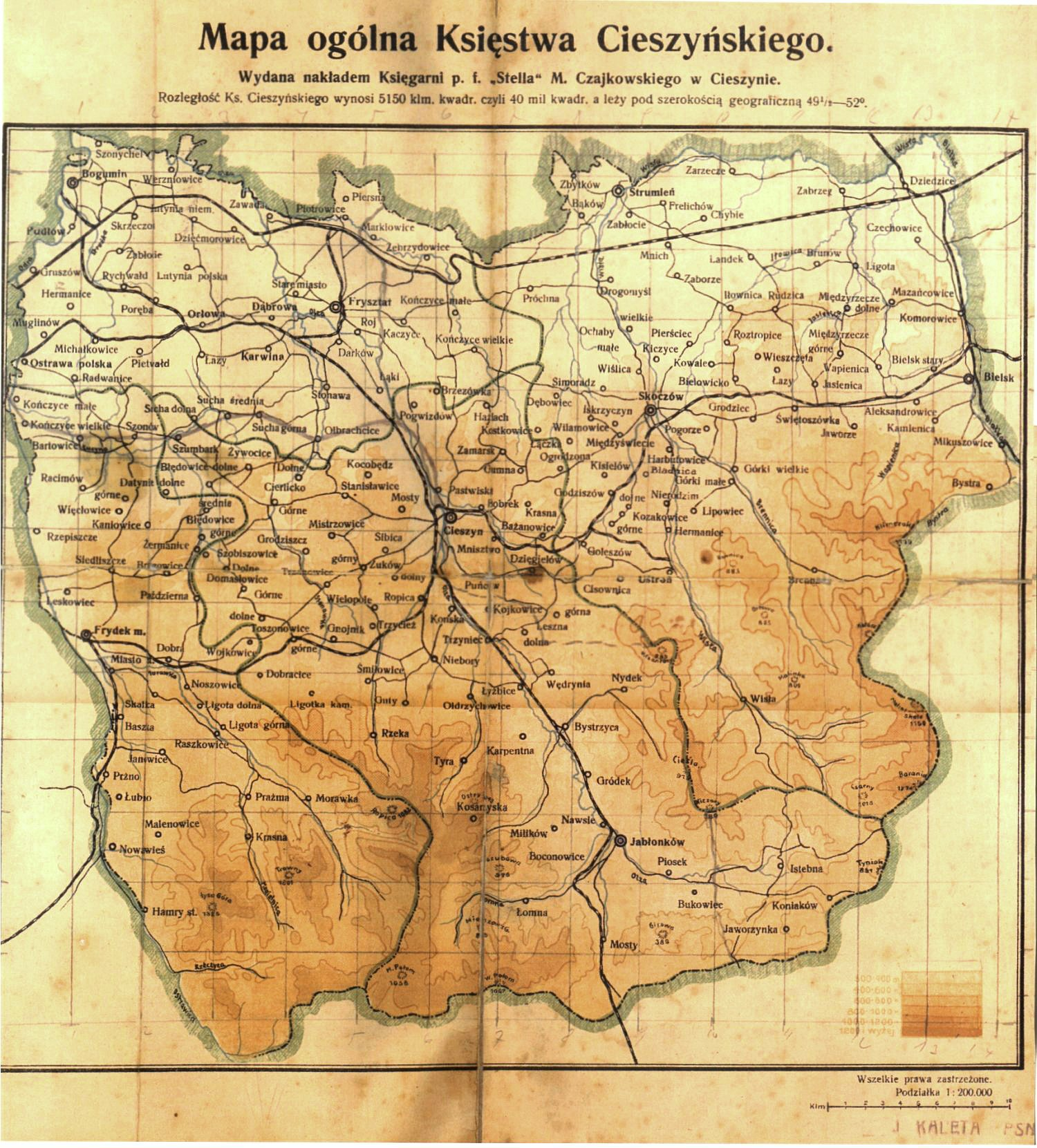
Polish map of the Duchy of Cieszyn, 20th century
