= Frederick Casimir of Cieszyn =

Frederick Casimir
- heir apparent to dukedom of Cieszyn
- Coat-of-arms of Upper Silesia (Cieszyn, etc).
- Born: December 1541/January 1542
- Died: d. 4 May 1571
- Noble family: Silesian Piasts
- Spouse: Katharina of Legnica
- Issue: Κatharina
- Father: Wenceslaus III Adam, Duke of Cieszyn
- Mother: Maria of Pernstein

Frederick Casimir of Cieszyn also known as of Fryštát (Polish: Fryderyk Kazimierz Cieszyński or Frysztacki; German: Friedrich Kasimir von Teschen-Freystadt; b. December 1541/January 1542 - d. 4 May 1571), was a Polish prince member of the House of Piast in the Cieszyn branch and ruler over Fryštát, Skoczów (both since 1560), and Bielsko (since 1565).

He was the second child but only son of Wenceslaus III Adam, Duke of Cieszyn, by his first wife Maria, daughter of John III of Pernstein.

== Life ==
Little is known about Frederick Casimir's first years. In 1560 he received from his father the towns of Fryštát and Skoczów. Five years later, in 1565, Duke Wenceslaus III Adam also give to him Bielsko.

During almost all of his life, Frederick Casimir was the sole heir of the Duchy of Teschen (Cieszyn). However, this changed in 1567 when, after his mother's death, his father remarried with Sidonie Katharina of Saxe-Lauenburg and three years later, in 1570, she gave birth to her first son, Christian August. The premature death of his new half-brother within eleven months placed Frederick Casimir again as the only heir of Cieszyn.

Although he did not have a high income, Frederick Casimir ran a sumptuous lifestyle, as in a short period he led his lands on bankruptcy. The total amount of his debts, after a revision of a special Imperial Committee was the astronomical sum of 244,000 talers. After his death, his father was forced to sell his lands in order to pay his debts.

In 1592, Frederick Casimir half-brother and next Duke of Cieszyn, Adam Wenceslaus (born in 1574, long after Frederick Casimir's death) managed to recover only Skoczów. Fryštát and Bielsko remained as a part of the magnate Member State.

== Marriage and issue ==
On 28 December 1563, Frederick Casimir married Katharina (b. 7 February 1542 – d. 3 September 1569), daughter of Duke Frederick III of Legnica. They had one daughter:

1. Katharina (b. 6 August 1565 - d. December? 1571).
