= Adam Wenceslaus, Duke of Cieszyn =

Adam Wenceslaus
- Duke of Cieszyn
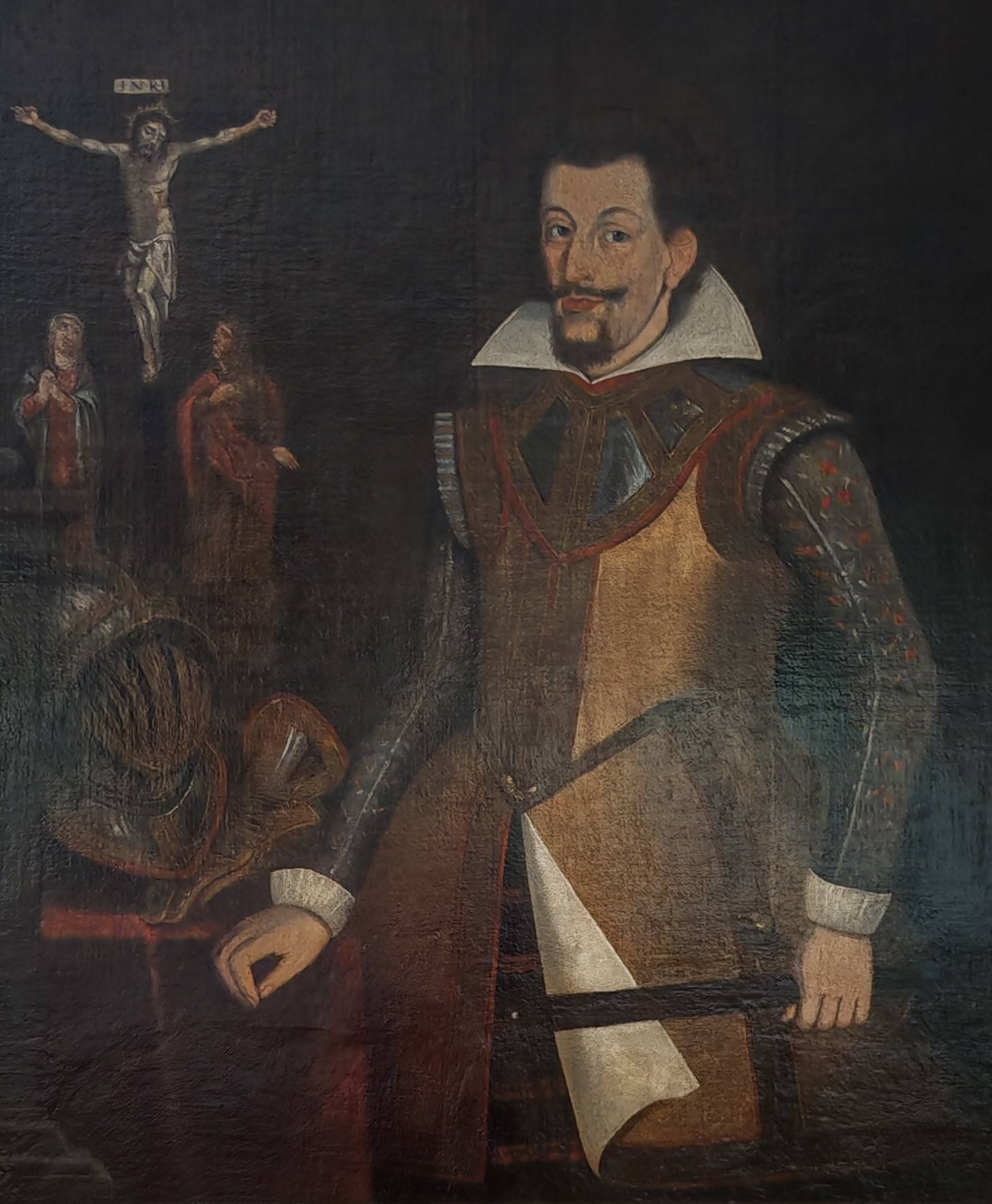
- Born: 12 December 1574
- Died: 13 July 1617 (aged 42)
- Noble family: Silesian Piasts
- Spouse: Elisabeth Kettler of Courland
- Issue: Elizabeth Lucretia, Duchess of Cieszyn; Frederick William, Duke of Cieszyn
- Father: Wenceslaus III Adam, Duke of Cieszyn
- Mother: Sidonia Katharina of Saxe-Lauenburg

Adam Wenceslaus of Cieszyn (Polish: Adam Wacław cieszyński, Czech: Adam Václav Těšínský, German: Adam Wenzel von Teschen; 12 December 1574 – 13 July 1617) was the Duke of Cieszyn from 1579 until his death.

He was the second but only surviving son of Wenceslaus III Adam, Duke of Cieszyn, by his second wife Sidonia Katharina, daughter of Francis I, Duke of Saxe-Lauenburg. His older half-brother, Frederick Casimir, only son of Wenceslaus III Adam's first marriage, died a few years before he was born, in 1571.

== Life ==
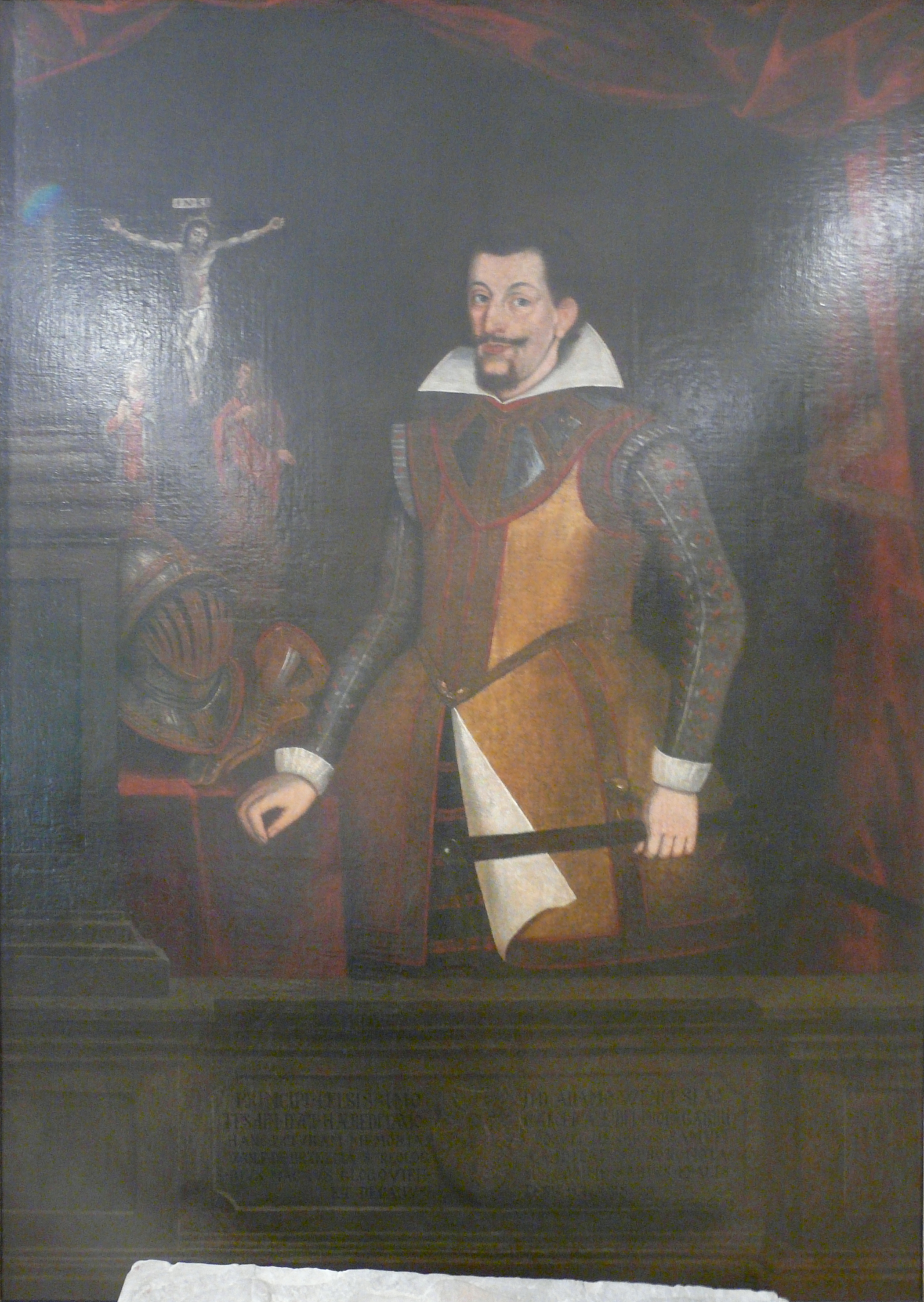

After his father's death in 1579, Adam Wenceslaus inherited the Duchy of Cieszyn; but because he was a minor at that time, the regency was held by his mother and the Dukes George II of Brzeg and Karl II of Ziębice. This triple regency continued until 1586, when the Dowager Duchess Sidonia Katharina remarried with the Hungarian nobleman Imre III Forgach, Obergespan [Count] of Trenčín (17 February) and the eldest regent, Duke George II of Brzeg, died (7 May). Despite her new marriage, Sidonia Katharina retained her influence in Cieszyn. Duke Karl II of Ziębice ruled since them as sole regent.

In 1586 Cieszyn Silesia suffered a very serious epidemic of plague who caused the death of several residents of the Duchy. One year later, in 1587, Cieszyn became in the center of the fight between Piastów other scourge for example, in 1587 the area became a duchy terrain fighting between the Archduke Maximilian III of Austria and Jan Zamoyski during the War of the Polish Succession.

In view of the continuing threats, in 1587 Adam Wenceslaus was sent in 1587 to the Electoral court in Saxony. There, the young Duke received a careful education, particularly in the military affairs. It was only in 1595 when he returned to Cieszyn, and, because, he was legally an adult, he began his independent government.

Since the beginning of his personal rule, Adam Wenceslaus took part in the wars with Turks and also declared political sympathies towards to the Emperor Rudolf II; this resulted in the need to build, in the southern part of the Duchy, some defensive fortifications. This case has special significance during the emergence of Bocskai during 1604–1606, when the Hungarian anti-Habsburg army almost defeated the Cieszyn troops.

In 1609 Adam Wenceslaus was in the middle of the conflict between Emperor Rudolf II and his brother Archduke Matthias. The Duke of Cieszyn stood at the side of the former. Finally, Rudolf II gave his brother the Bohemian crown, which placed to Adam Wenceslaus in a particularly awkward situation, who had submitted in 1611 when he had to paid homage to the new King in Wrocław.

For other reasons, the year of 1611 had a significant importance in Adam Wenceslaus's life. His time in Saxony made him a determined Protestant and in several times he issued decrees aimed at promotion of Lutheranism in Cieszyn (for example, in 1598 the Duke decreed a privilege, under which his successors were obligated to stimulate the Lutheran faith among his subjects and built churches with this purpose). However, some of his relatives, who like him where educated in the Electoral court, opted for converted to Catholicism. Adam Wenceslaus had a total variation in his Protestant politics—in accordance with the principle of "cuius regio, eius religio"—and started the fight with the Church, followed the evangelical spirit of the Counter-Reformation (one of the first decisions of Adam Wenceslaus after his conversion to the Catholic faith was the cancellation of the Privilege of 1598). This caused hard resistance between the nobility and burghers; however, a large part of the population also shifted to Roman Catholicism. Soon after, the Duke restored to the expelled Catholic religious orders (like the Dominicans and Franciscans) their former monasteries. The exact reasons for the Duke of Cieszyn's conversion are unknown, but this was probably in order to amended his relations with his sovereign, King Matthias of Bohemia, since 1612 also Holy Roman Emperor. However, Adam Wenceslaus wasn't a fervent Catholic and didn't force the part of the Cieszyn population who remained Protestant to shift to the Catholic faith.

This radical step in fact improved the Duke's relations with Emperor Matthias, who on 6 February 1617 appointed Adam Wenceslaus as Landeshauptmann General of Silesia.

The rule of Adam Wenceslaus over Cieszyn proved to be less favorable. The constant trips, expensive military expeditions, and finally the change of faith, led the Duchy in the imminent bankruptcy. Two examples of his expensive lifestyle were the trip to Wrocław to paid homage to the King Matthias—his suite, composed by 285 people, were richly furnished by him—and in 1614, after a vote for his miraculous conversion, Adam Wenceslaus went on a pilgrimage to Kalwaria Zebrzydowska. This trip, according to contemporary sources, was not religious: the Duke's only desire was to show his wealth. At the end, his debts were often paid by the towns and chivalry.

Adam Wenceslaus died on 13 July 1617 in Brandys, a Cieszyn suburb, and was buried in the Dominican church of Cieszyn. In 1617 Adam Bysiński from Bysina, heir of Iłownica, accused three Cieszyn noblemen to poisoned Adam Wenceslaus: Erazm Rudzki, speaker of the Chancellor, Waclaw Pelhrzim from Trzenkowice (von Pelchrzim), a Judge court, and Piotr Gurecki from Kornice on Jaworzu. On 21 December 1622 both parties concluded an agreement, and the allegations of Bysiński were dismissed.

== Marriage and issue ==
On 17 September 1595 Adam Wenceslaus married with Elisabeth (d. 19 November 1601), daughter of Gotthard Kettler, Duke of Courland. They had five children:

1. Adam Gotthard (27 July 1596 – 25 May 1597).
2. Anna Sidonia (2 March 1598 – 13 March 1619), married on 1 November 1616 to Count Jakob Hannibal II of Hohenems.
3. Elizabeth Lucretia (1 June 1599 – 19 May 1653).
4. Christian Adam (1600 – 12 March 1602).
5. Frederick William (9 November 1601 – Köln, 19 August 1625).

In addition to his legitimate offspring, he had an illegitimate son, born from his relationship with Małgorzata Kostlachówna (ca. 1584 – Cieszyn, 3 January 1617):

- Baron Wenceslaus Gottfried of Hohenstein (1608/12 – aft. 1672).

== Ancestry ==
Ancestors of Adam Wenceslaus, Duke of Cieszyn

16. Bolesław II, Duke of Cieszyn
8. Casimir II, Duke of Cieszyn
17. Anna of Bielsk
4. Wenceslaus II, Duke of Cieszyn
18. Victor of Poděbrady, Duke of Münsterberg
9. Johanna of Poděbrady
19. Margaret Ptáčková
2. Wenceslaus III Adam, Duke of Cieszyn
20. Albrecht III Achilles, Elector of Brandenburg
10. Frederick I, Margrave of Brandenburg-Ansbach
21. Anna of Saxony
5. Anna of Brandenburg-Ansbach
22. Casimir IV Jagiellon
11. Sophia of Poland
23. Elisabeth of Habsburg
1. Adam Wenceslaus, Duke of Cieszyn
24. John V, Duke of Saxe-Lauenburg
12. Magnus I, Duke of Saxe-Lauenburg
25. Dorothea of Brandenburg
6. Francis I, Duke of Saxe-Lauenburg
26. Henry IV, Duke of Brunswick-Lüneburg
13. Catherine of Brunswick-Wolfenbüttel
27. Catherine of Pomerania
3. Sidonia Catharina of Saxe-Lauenburg
28. Albert III, Duke of Saxony
14. Henry IV, Duke of Saxony
29. Sidonie of Poděbrady
7. Sibylle of Saxony
30. Magnus II, Duke of Mecklenburg
15. Catherine of Mecklenburg
31. Sophie of Pomerania-Stettin

== Footnotes ==
Adam Wenceslaus, Duke of Cieszyn House of Piast Born: 12 December 1574 Died: 13 July 1617
Regnal titles
Preceded by Wenceslaus III Adam	Duke of Cieszyn; 1579–1617	Succeeded by Frederick William
