= Wenceslaus III Adam =

- Duke of Cieszyn
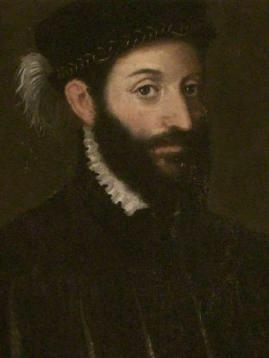
- Wenceslaus III Adam
- Born: December 1524
- Died: 4 November 1579 (aged 54)
- Noble family: Silesian Piasts
- Spouses: Maria of Pernstein; Catharina of Saxe-Lauenburg
- Issue: Frederick Casimir of Cieszyn; Christian August; Anna Sibylla; Adam Wenceslaus, Duke of Cieszyn
- Father: Wenceslaus II, Duke of Cieszyn
- Mother: Anna of Brandenburg-Ansbach

Wenceslaus III Adam of Cieszyn (Czech: Václav III. Adam, German: Wenzel III. Adam, Polish: Wacław III Adam; December 1524 – 4 November 1579) was a Duke of Cieszyn from 1528 until his death.

He was the second but only surviving son of Wenceslaus II, co-Duke of Cieszyn, by his wife Anna, daughter of Frederick I, Margrave of Brandenburg-Ansbach. He was born one month after his father's death, on 17 November 1524.

== Life ==
Since the time of his birth, Wenceslaus III Adam was placed under the guardianship of his grandfather Casimir II, Duke of Cieszyn as his only heir, until his death four-year later, in 1528. In his will, Duke Casimir II left his Duchy to his grandson under the regency of his mother Anna and the Bohemian magnate Jan, Baron of Pernštejn and Count of Kłodzko, called "The Rich".

During his minority, the young Duke spent much time at the Imperial court in Vienna, where he was educated. Despite this, Wenceslaus III Adam adopted the new Evangelical faith, and followed this religion until his death.

At the time of his mother's death in 1539, Wenceslaus III Adam was already fifteen-years-old, and, according to the House of Piast customs, he was since them considered an adult and able to rule by himself. Despite this, Jan of Pernštejn remained as a regent and held the effective government until 9 May 1545, when he finally renounced to the regency only in exchange of the lands of Místek and Friedland as a pledge.

Under the rule of Wenceslaus III Adam, Cieszyn economy was stabilized and even developed, despite the fact that during the period of regency were lost the Upper Silesia lands gained during the reign of Casimir II and the Duchy of Opava.

In 1548 his former regent Jan of Pernštejn died, leaving Mistek and Friedland to his sons Jaroslav, Vratislav and Vojtěch. However, soon after Wenceslaus III pledged this land to Jan of Czechowic.

One of the most important events of Wenceslaus III Adam's rule was the introduction of the Protestant Reformation in his domains. Various historians deemed it began in the Duchy at the beginning of his rule, but real consequences of Reformation can be seen not until 1540. Most visible sign of the Reformation was the closure of Franciscan (polish Bernardyni) and Dominican convents in Cieszyn and later also Benedictine convent in Orlová. Population of the Duchy also shifted to Protestantism. Both duke's wives also supported Protestantism in the duchy.

Part of the goods obtained from the Catholic religious orders were transferred to the city hospital in Cieszyn, where he treated the poor. As a young prince Wenceslaus III Adam was educated in the medical science, dealing with the care of patients, which gained special significance during the epidemic of 1570.

On 24 June 1573 Wenceslas III Adam issued the called "Land Ordinance of the Duchy of Cieszyn" (Zřízení zemské Knížecství Těšínského) which represented a set of regulations over all the inhabitants of the Duchy. This law, initially taken with great caution, was finally accepted by his subjects.

In foreign policy, despite his conversion to Lutheranism, Wenceslaus III Adam based his career in the faithful service to the House of Habsburg in Vienna. He was present, among others in Bratislava at the coronation of Maximilian II as King of Hungary in 1563 and in the funerals of Ferdinand I in 1565 in Vienna.

In 1573 he ordered the building of expensive defensive fortifications near Mosty u Jablunkova to secure the Duchy against eventual Turkish attack. In the same year, Wenceslaus III Adam was a candidate to the Polish throne after the extinction of the Jagiellonian dynasty, but without success.

Another big problem for the Duke was the prodigality of his oldest son, Frederick Casimir, who was named ruler over Fryštát and Skoczów in 1560, and five years later, he also received Bielsko. Frederick Casimir's debts are so high that, when he suddenly died in 1571, Wenceslaus III Adam had to sell this lands to other Piast Dukes.

Wenceslaus III Adam died victim of an apoplexy attack, after a long and debilitating disease on 4 November 1579. He was buried in the former Dominican church in Cieszyn.

== Marriages and Issue ==
On 8 February 1540, Wenceslaus III Adam married firstly with Maria (b. 24 February 1524 - d. 19 November 1566), daughter of his guardian Jan of Pernštejn. The marriage was decided by the Duke Casimir II, and the engagement was formalized on 8 September 1528, three months after Casimir II's death. From his father-in-law, Wenceslaus III Adam received the amount of 12,000 Hungarian pieces of gold as a dowry. This union produced three children:

1. Sophie (b. 1540 - d. 1541).
2. Frederick Casimir (b. December 1541/January 1542 - d. 4 May 1571).
3. Anna (b. 7 March 1543 - d. bef. 1564).

In Cieszyn on 25 November 1567, Wenceslaus III Adam married secondly with Sidonia Catharina of Saxe-Lauenburg (d. December 1594), daughter of Duke Francis I of Saxe-Lauenburg. They had six children:

1. A daughter (b. and d. shortly aft. 23 February 1569).
2. Christian August (b. 30 April 1570 - d. 18 February 1571).
3. Maria Sidonia (b. 10 May 1572 - d. 3 October 1587), married on 20 January 1587 to Duke Frederick IV of Legnica.
4. Anna Sibylla (b. 4 June 1573 - d. aft. 1601).
5. Adam Wenceslaus (b. 12 December 1574 - d. 13 July 1617).
6. Jan Albert (b. 3 August 1578 - d. bef. 4 November 1579).

== Ancestry ==
Ancestors of Wenceslaus III Adam

16. Bolesław I, Duke of Cieszyn
8. Bolesław II, Duke of Cieszyn
17. Euphemia of Masovia
4. Casimir II, Duke of Cieszyn
18. Ivan Vladimirovich, Prince of Bielsk
9. Anna of Bielsk
19. Vasilisa of Halshany
2. Wenceslaus II, Duke of Cieszyn
20. George of Poděbrady, king of Bohemia
10. Victor of Poděbrady, Duke of Münsterberg
21. Kunigunde of Sternberg
5. Johanna of Poděbrady
22. Hynek Ptáček of Pirkstein
11. Margaret Ptáčková
23. Anna of Neuhaus
1. Wenceslaus III Adam, Duke of Cieszyn
24. Frederick I, Elector of Brandenburg
12. Albrecht III Achilles, Elector of Brandenburg
25. Elisabeth of Bavaria-Landshut
6. Frederick I, Margrave of Brandenburg-Ansbach
26. Frederick II, Elector of Saxony
13. Anna of Saxony
27. Margaret of Austria
3. Anna of Brandenburg-Ansbach
28. Władysław II Jagiełło
14. Casimir IV Jagiellon
29. Sophia of Halshany
7. Sophia of Poland
30. Albert II of Germany
15. Elisabeth of Habsburg
31. Elizabeth of Bohemia

== Footnotes ==
Wenceslaus III Adam House of Piast Born: December 1524 Died: 4 November 1579
Regnal titles
Preceded by Casimir II	Duke of Cieszyn; 1528–1579	Succeeded by Adam Wenceslaus
