= Wenceslaus II of Cieszyn =

Silesian duke (died 1524)

Wenceslaus II
- Duke of Cieszyn
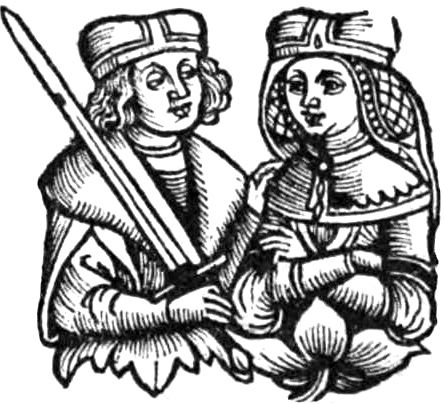
- Born: 1488/96
- Died: 17 November 1524
- Noble family: Silesian Piasts of Opole
- Spouse: Anna of Brandenburg-Ansbach
- Issue: Ludmila; Wenceslaus III Adam, Duke of Cieszyn
- Father: Casimir II, Duke of Cieszyn
- Mother: Johanna of Poděbrady

Wenceslaus II of Cieszyn (Polish: Wacław II cieszyński; 1488/96 – 17 November 1524) was a Duke of Cieszyn from 1518 until his death (as co-ruler of his father).

He was the second son of Casimir II, Duke of Cieszyn, by his wife Johanna Poděbrady, daughter of Victor, Duke of Münsterberg and Duke of Opawa.

== Life ==
The decision of Casimir II to destine his eldest son Frederick to the Church career placed Wenceslaus as the presumed successor of his father. Frederick's death in 1507 led Wenceslaus II as the sole heir of Casimir II, but it wasn't until 1518 that he was named co-ruler of the Duchy of Cieszyn. However, he died four years before his father, so Wenceslaus II never ruled alone. After Casimir II's death in 1528 he was succeeded by his grandson Wenceslaus III Adam, the only surviving son of Wenceslaus II.

== Marriage and issue ==
On 1 December 1518, Wenceslaus II married Anna (b. 5 May 1487 - d. 7 February 1539), daughter of Frederick I, Margrave of Brandenburg-Ansbach. They had three children:

1. A son (b. by 31 May 1520 - d. 1520/bef. 1 September 1525?).
2. Ludmila (b. ca. 1523 - d. aft. March/7 April 1539).
3. Wenceslaus III Adam (b. after the death of his father, December 1524 - d. 4 November 1579).

Regnal titles
Preceded by Casimir II	Duke of Cieszyn; 1518–1524 with Casimir II	Succeeded by Casimir II
